= Deer Park railway station =

Railway station in Melbourne, Australia

Deer Park
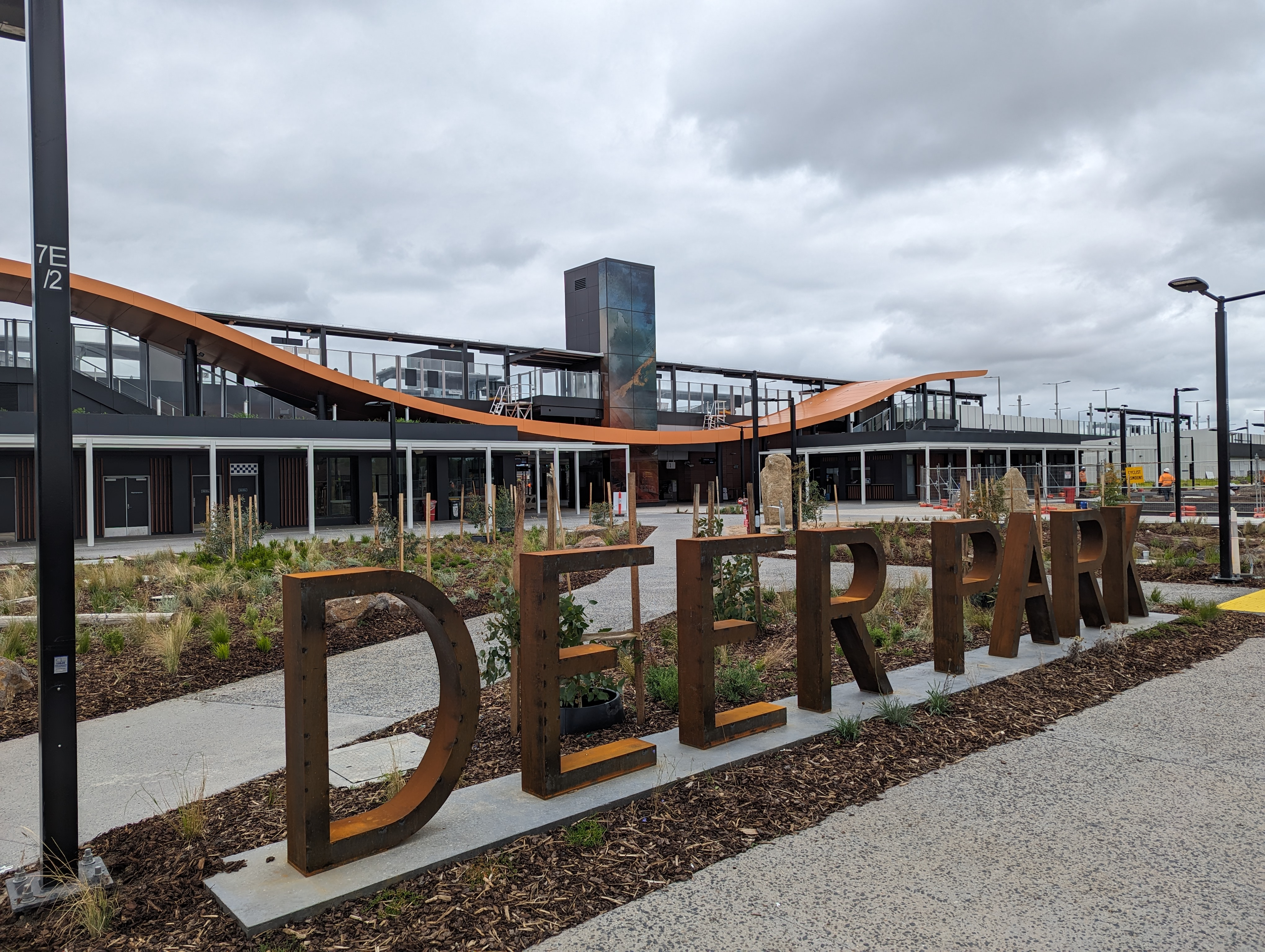
- Station forecourt and entrance from Railway Parade, January 2024

General information
- Location: Railway Place, Deer Park, Victoria 3023; City of Brimbank; Australia
- Coordinates: 37.7777°S 144.7717°E
- System: PTV regional rail station
- Owner: VicTrack
- Operator: V/Line
- Lines: Ballarat Ararat Maryborough; (Ararat); Geelong Warrnambool; (Warrnambool)
- Distance: 17.83 kilometres from Southern Cross
- Platforms: 2 side
- Tracks: 2
- Connections: Bus

Construction
- Structure type: Elevated
- Parking: 150+
- Cycle facilities: Yes
- Accessible: Yes

Other information
- Status: Operational, unstaffed
- Station code: DPK
- Fare zone: Myki Zone 2
- Website: Public Transport Victoria

History
- Opened: 2 April 1884; 142 years ago
- Rebuilt: 3 October 1976; 2009; 24 April 2023 (LXRP)
- Former names: Kororoit (1884-1889)

Passengers
- 2013–2014: 87,358
- 2014–2015: 95,415 ▲9.22%
- 2015–2016: 222,279 ▲132.96%
- 2016–2017: 316,582 ▲42.42%
- 2017–2018: Not measured
- 2018–2019: 453,950 ▲43.39%
- 2019–2020: 395,900 ▼12.78%
- 2020–2021: 240,650 ▼39.21%
- 2021–2022: 269,400 ▲11.94%

Services
| Preceding station | V/Line | Following station |
|---|---|---|
| Ardeer towards Southern Cross | Ballarat line | Caroline Springs towards Wendouree |
| Ardeer towards Southern Cross | Melton line | Caroline Springs towards Melton or Bacchus Marsh |
| Ardeer towards Southern Cross | Ararat line | Caroline Springs towards Ararat |
| Ardeer towards Southern Cross | Maryborough line One daily service | Caroline Springs One-way operation |
| Sunshine towards Southern Cross | Geelong line | Tarneit towards Wyndham Vale, Geelong or Waurn Ponds |
| Sunshine towards Southern Cross | Warrnambool line One service per night | Tarneit One-way operation |
Track layout
Location

Deer Park railway station is a regional railway station operated by V/Line on the Ararat and Warrnambool lines, part of the Victoria rail network. It serves the western suburb of Deer Park, in Melbourne, Victoria, Australia. Deer Park is an elevated premium station, featuring two side platforms. The station opened on 2 April 1884, with the current station provided in April 2023 by the Level Crossing Removal Project.

Initially opened as Kororoit, the station was given its current name of Deer Park on 3 December 1889.

== History ==
Deer Park station opened as Kororoit on 2 April 1884, along with the Serviceton line, and was renamed Deer Park in 1899, by which time the station had a three road yard, passenger platform on the southern track, a goods platform on the northern track, and an interlocked signal box. Being on a single track railway, it served as a crossing loop for trains, which remained until 1913, when the signal box was abolished.

In 1928, a siding serving Nobel Chemical Finishes (Australia) Pty Ltd was provided at the up (Spencer Street) end of the station, running north to a loop siding and dead end. In 1929, alterations were made to the electric staff working of trains, to permit workers trains to operate to the Nobel factories at Ardeer and Deer Park. In 1943, the signal box was reopened, in conjunction with the opening of the new Ravenhall siding (Commonwealth Government Siding), at the down end of the yard. The new siding ran south from the line to a loop siding, before terminating at a dead end. Also occurring in that year, flashing light signals were provided at the former Mount Derrimut Road level crossing (then known as Station Road), which was located at the up end of the station.

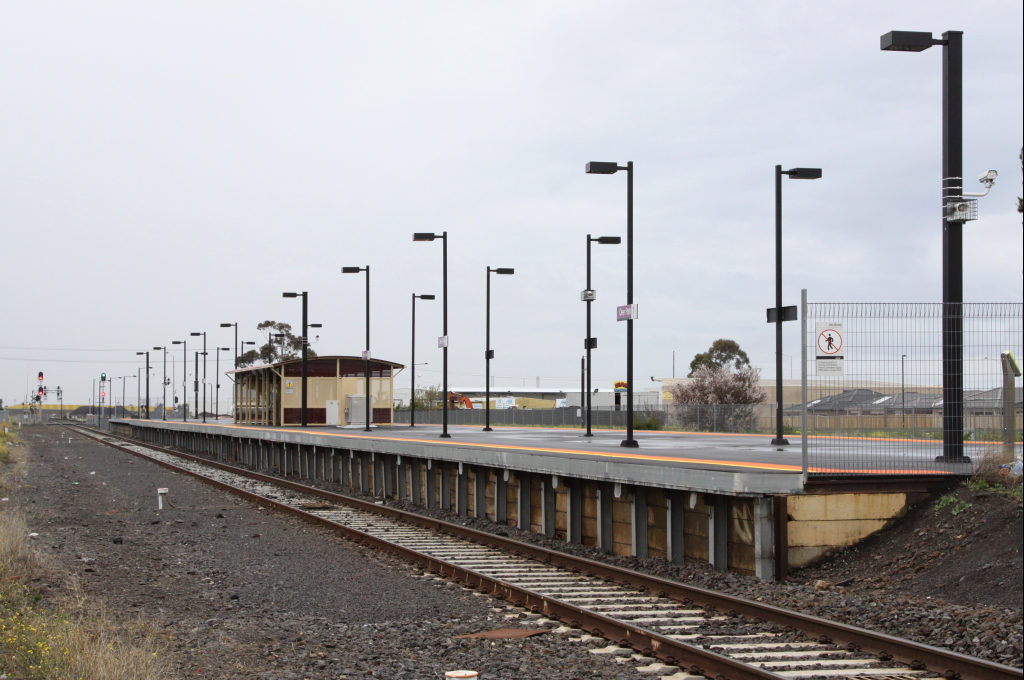
Eastbound view of the upgraded former ground level Platform 1, September 2010

The Nobel siding (later ICIANZ) was closed in 1955 and, in 1976, the line from Sunshine to Deer Park West Junction was duplicated, with the current island platform also provided. The signal box was closed, and the line was worked by Centralised Traffic Control from Sunshine. Crossovers between both lines were provided at each end of the platform. In 1978, the Ravenhall siding was abolished.

In 1981, boom barriers were provided at the former Mount Derrimut Road level crossing. In 1987, one of the loop sidings in the yard was removed, with the last siding removed in 1989, leaving only the main line and platform. In 2005, as part of the Regional Fast Rail project, control of the signalling was transferred to the Ballarat signal box.

In September 2009, an upgrade of Deer Park station commenced, including:

- 150 paved car-parking spaces;
- improved station access, lighting and signage;
- improved station security via CCTV;
- retain as many trees as possible, as well as planting new trees;
- protect native grasses to the east of the new car park.

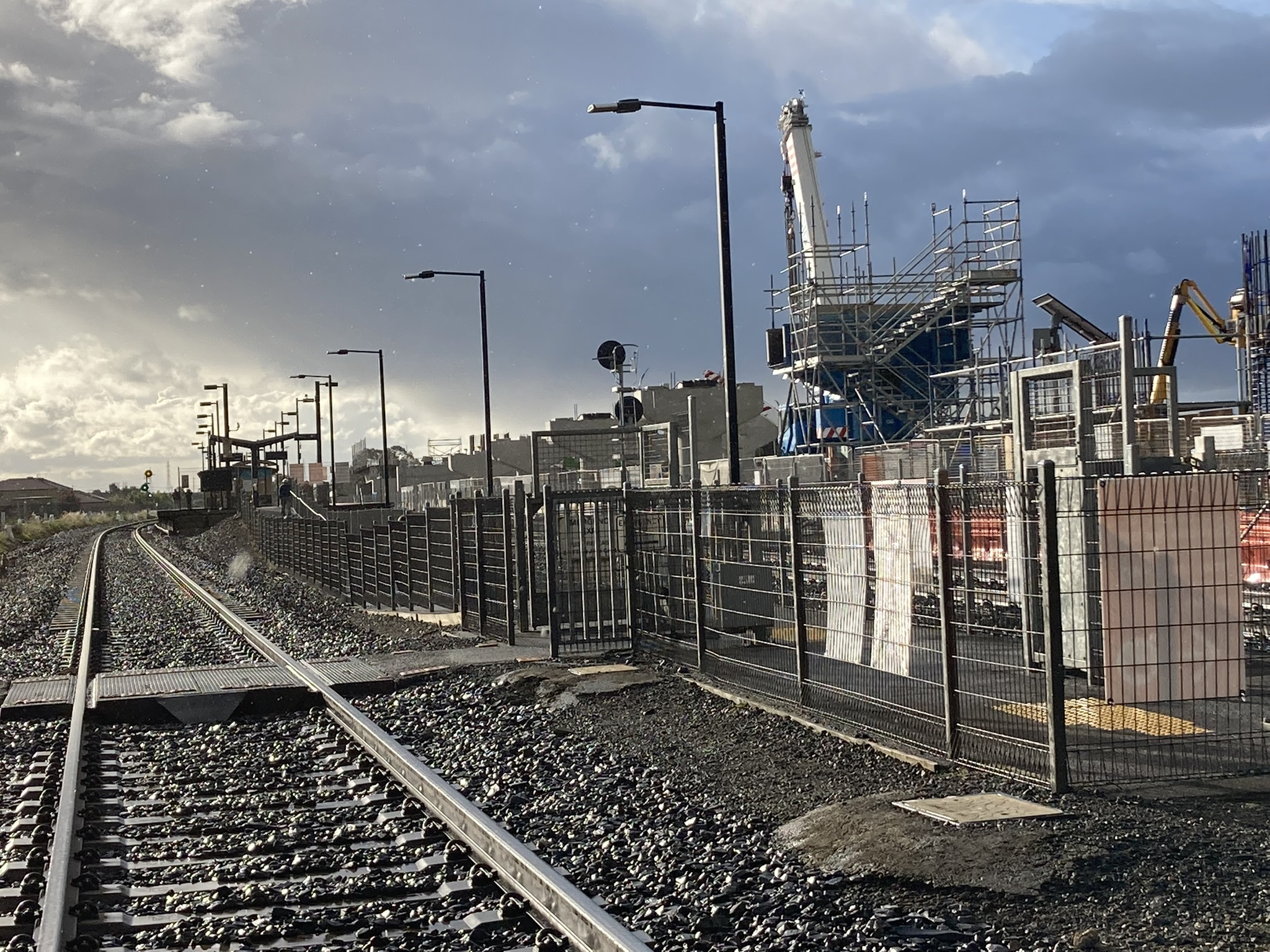
Westbound view of platforms, with works for the station rebuilding and level crossing removal works in the background, November 2022

Eastbound view from the elevated and rebuilt Platform 2, May 2023

In June 2015, the junction of the Deer Park – West Werribee line, part of the Regional Rail Link project, opened three kilometres west of Deer Park. The year prior, during major construction works, the station underwent a minor upgrade as part of the project. There were changes to the platform and the car-park, and safety fences were installed between the tracks and the car-park waiting area.

First announced by the Andrews State Government in 2018, the station is set to be integrated into the metropolitan railway network, as part of the Western Rail Plan.

As part of the Regional Rail Revival project, 18 km (11 mi) of track was duplicated between Deer Park West and Melton. It was provided in late 2019, coinciding with the opening of Cobblebank.

As part of the Level Crossing Removal Project, the Mount Derrimut Road level crossing was grade separated and the station rebuilt in April 2023. The railway line was elevated over the road, along with the rebuilt station. Construction began in 2021, with the station and adjacent road reopening on 24 April 2023. Deer Park is also the first station in Victoria to have a roof garden

== Platforms and services ==
Deer Park has two side platforms. It is serviced by V/Line Ballarat, Ararat and Geelong line services. It is also serviced by selected Maryborough line services, as well as one Warrnambool line service each night towards Southern Cross.

Deer Park platform arrangement
| Platform | Line | Destination | Stopping Pattern | Notes | Source |
|---|---|---|---|---|---|
| 1 | Ballarat line Ararat line Maryborough line Geelong line Warrnambool line | Southern Cross | All stations and limited express services | | |
| 2 | Geelong line | Wyndham Vale, Geelong, South Geelong, Marshall, Waurn Ponds | All stations and limited express services | _{Services to Wyndham Vale, Geelong, South Geelong & Marshall only operate on weekdays.} | |
| 2 | Ballarat line Ararat line | Melton, Bacchus Marsh, Wendouree, Ararat, | All stations and limited express services | _{Services to Melton and Bacchus Marsh only operate on weekdays.} | |

== Transport links ==
CDC Melbourne operates one bus route via Deer Park station, under contract to Public Transport Victoria:

- 400 : Sunshine station – Laverton station (shared with Transit Systems Victoria)

Transit Systems Victoria operates four routes via Deer Park station, under contract to Public Transport Victoria:

- 400 : Sunshine station – Laverton station (shared with CDC Melbourne)
- 405 : to Brimbank Central Shopping Centre
- 420 : Sunshine station – Watergardens station
- 422 : Sunshine station – Brimbank Central Shopping Centre
