= Caroline Springs railway station =

Railway station in Melbourne, Australia

Caroline Springs
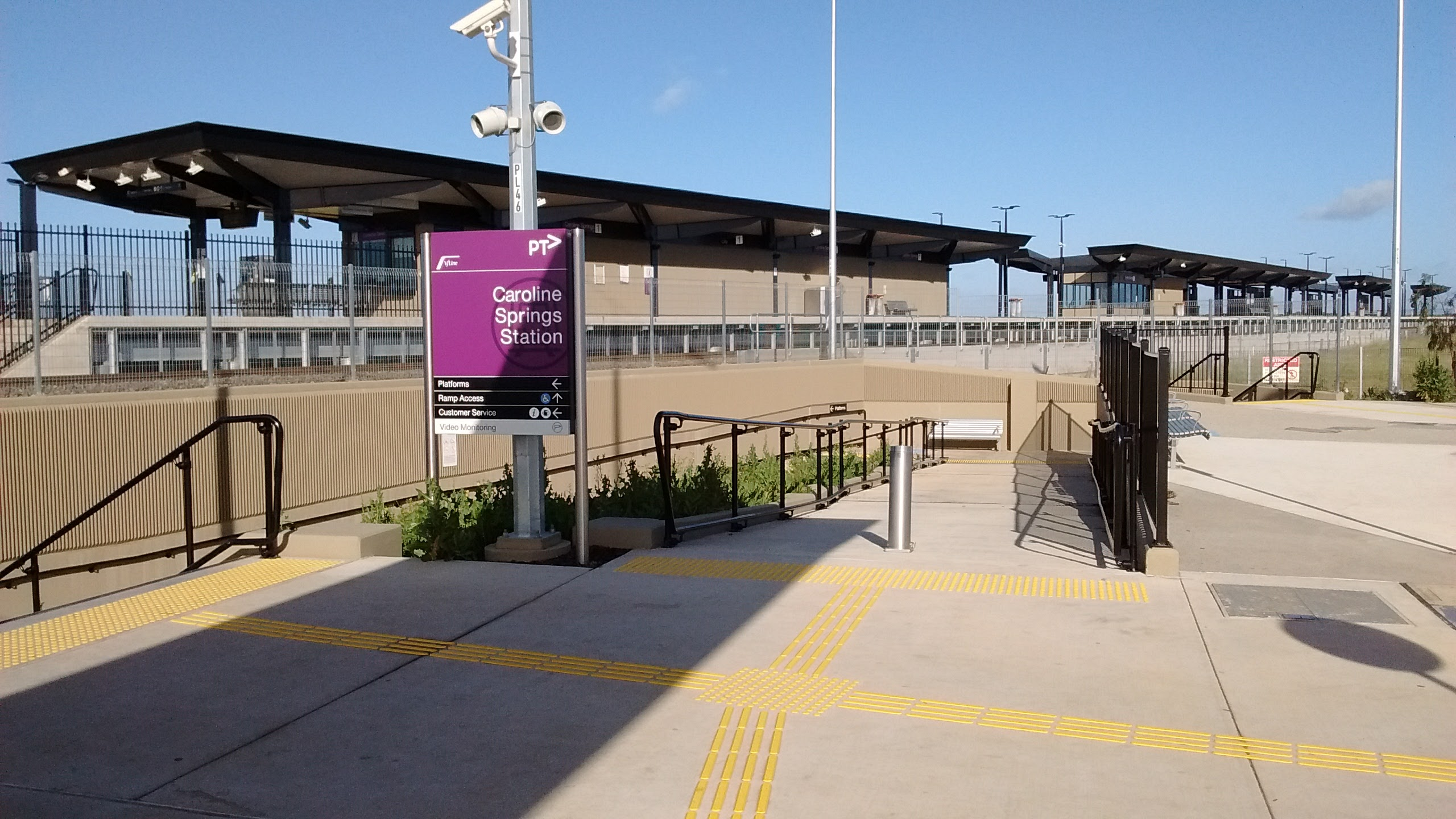
- Station concourse and entrance, October 2017

General information
- Location: Christies Road, Ravenhall, Victoria 3023; City of Melton; Australia
- Coordinates: 37°46′4″S 144°44′18″E
- System: PTV regional rail station
- Owner: VicTrack
- Operator: V/Line
- Lines: Ballarat Ararat Maryborough (Ararat)
- Distance: 21.20 kilometres from Southern Cross
- Platforms: 2 (1 island)
- Tracks: 2
- Connections: Bus

Construction
- Structure type: Ground
- Parking: 750
- Cycle facilities: Yes
- Accessible: Yes

Other information
- Status: Operational, staffed part-time
- Station code: CPS
- Fare zone: Myki Zone 2
- Website: Public Transport Victoria

History
- Opened: 28 January 2017; 9 years ago
- Former names: Ravenhall (provisionally)

Passengers
- 2016–2017: 60,248
- 2017–2018: Not measured
- 2018–2019: 165,500 ▲174.7%
- 2019–2020: 126,700 ▼23.44%
- 2020–2021: 64,400 ▼49.17%

Services
Preceding station	V/Line	Following station
Deer Park towards Southern Cross	Ballarat line	Rockbank towards Wendouree
Deer Park towards Southern Cross	Melton line	Rockbank towards Melton or Bacchus Marsh
Deer Park towards Southern Cross	Ararat line	Rockbank towards Ararat
Deer Park towards Southern Cross	Maryborough line One daily service	Rockbank One-way operation
Track layout
Location

Caroline Springs railway station is a regional railway station operated by V/Line on the Ararat and Ballarat lines, part of the Victoria rail network. It serves the western suburb of Ravenhall, in Melbourne, Victoria, Australia. Caroline Springs is a ground-level premium station, featuring an island platform. The station opened on 28 January 2017.

The station was provisionally named as Ravenhall. However, during construction, it was given the name "Caroline Springs".

== History ==
The Victorian Transport Plan, released in 2008, proposed the progressive upgrade of the Melton line, to support future urban development in the corridor. Construction of the station was to have commenced in 2010, and be completed in 2012.

After the 2010 state election, the Baillieu Government put further construction on hold, with an access road to the site having been partially constructed. Construction of a bridge over the railway line had to be completed, to serve the nearby Boral quarry, which otherwise would have been isolated by the new Regional Rail Link line that runs north-south across it.

In May 2014, in the run-up to the 2014 state election, the Napthine Government announced that construction would commence in 2014, with a scheduled 2016 completion date. Construction commenced in August 2015. However, in May 2016, the Andrews Government made the decision to "future-proof" the station for the duplication of the Ballarat line, by redesigning the station with a second platform. As a result, the opening of the station was delayed until early 2017.

On 28 January 2017, the station was officially opened by the Member for Kororoit, Marlene Kairouz, during a community day, with the first services calling at the station the following day.

First announced by the Andrews State Government in 2018, the station is set to be integrated into the metropolitan railway network, as part of the Western Rail Plan.

As part of the Regional Rail Revival project, 18 km of track was duplicated between Deer Park West and Melton. It was provided in late 2019, coinciding with the opening of Cobblebank.

In 2023, 400 new car parking spaces were delivered at the station.

== Platforms and services ==
Caroline Springs station has one island platform with two faces. It is served by V/Line Ballarat and Ararat line trains.

Caroline Springs platform arrangement
Platform	Line	Destination	Service Type
1	Ballarat line Ararat line Maryborough line	Southern Cross	Maryborough line: One daily V/Line service trains may depart platform 2 in case of disruption
2	Ballarat line Ararat line	Melton, Bacchus Marsh, Wendouree, Ararat trains may depart platform 1 in case of disruption	trains may depart platform 1 in case of disruptions

== Transport links ==
CDC Melbourne operates two routes to and from Caroline Springs station:

- 460 : to Watergardens station
- 462 : to Watergardens station
