= Proposed Melbourne rail extensions =

Extensions to the Melbourne rail network

Proposals for expansion of the Melbourne rail network are commonly presented by political parties, government agencies, industry organisations and public transport advocacy groups. The extensions proposed take a variety of forms: electrification of existing routes to incorporate them into the suburban rail system; reconstruction of former passenger rail lines along pre-existing easements; entirely new routes intended to serve new areas with heavy rail or provide alternative routes in congested areas; or track amplification along existing routes to provide segregation of services. Other proposals are for the construction of new or relocated stations on existing lines, to provide improved access to public transport services.

Proposals which have been adopted as policy by the state government, and which are in the detailed planning or construction phases, are also listed in this article.

== History ==
=== 1929 Metropolitan Town Planning Commission Plan ===
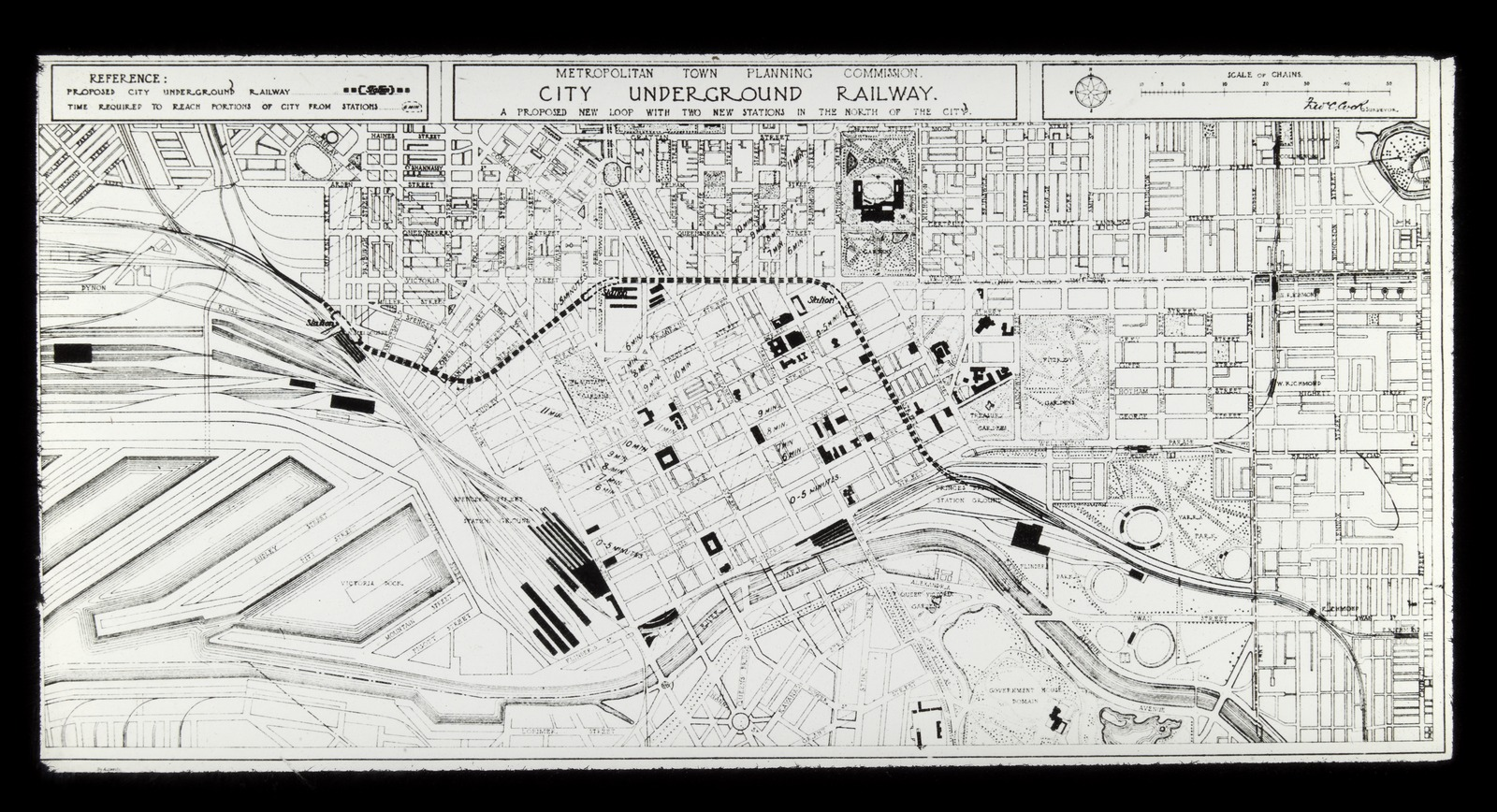
Map by the Metropolitan Town Planning Commission of a proposed underground railway c.1930-50. This plan eventually became the City Loop, completed in 1981.

The Metropolitan Town Planning Commission, established in 1922 by the Victorian state government, produced a report in 1929 that recommended a new underground railway in central Melbourne running via Exhibition and Victoria streets to reduce congestion at Flinders Street station. The plan also proposed:

- A rail loop in Fishermans Bend
- A rail line to Doncaster via tunnel beneath Kew and Kew East
- A rail extension from Malvern East to Glen Waverley
- A bridge connecting Spencer Street station and the Port Melbourne and St Kilda lines

=== 1940 Ashworth Improvement Plan ===
Proposed extensions to Melbourne's rail network, 1940.

A 1940 report by the Victorian Railways Chief Engineer for Ways and Works recommended a number of rail improvement works, including an underground city railway, a line to Doncaster via the Kew spur, and the connection of the Alamein line to the Glen Waverley line at Malvern East.

=== 1954 Melbourne Metropolitan Planning Scheme Report ===
A 1954 strategy released by the Melbourne & Metropolitan Board of Works recommended changes to Melbourne's land-use planning, an extensive network of freeways and a park system. It also recommended some expansions to the rail network, including an underground CBD rail line with three stations beneath Lonsdale Street. It also called for:

- A new rail loop in the industrial Fishermans Bend precinct with seven new stations to transport workers
- A new north–south rail link and bridge connecting Spencer Street station (now named Southern Cross) with the (no longer existing) Port Melbourne line, with a new station in Southbank
- A branch of the Hurstbridge line from Alphington to East Preston to serve Northcote, Preston and Heidelberg, running alongside Darebin Creek
- A branch of the Frankston line between Moorabbin and Highett stations to beachside suburb Beaumaris
- A new Mornington railway line from Frankston to Mornington via Mount Eliza

The report recommended against a line to Doncaster due to the high cost of tunnelling.

=== 1969 Melbourne Transportation Plan ===
A major plan released by the Victorian state government of Henry Bolte called for the creation of 510 kilometres of freeways, and a number of new rail lines. The plan proposed:

- An underground rail loop in central Melbourne
- A line to Doncaster connecting with the network at Victoria Park station
- A line to Monash University Clayton
- An extension from Altona to Westona
- An extension from Huntingdale to Ferntree Gully
- A new line connecting Dandenong and Frankston
- Several extensions of suburban electric service along existing lines to Werribee, Rockbank, Sunbury, Craigieburn, Coldstream, Hastings and Mornington

None of these proposed lines were ever built, except for the underground rail loop which began construction in 1971 and progressively opened between 1981 and 1985. The lines to Werribee, Sunbury and Craigieburn were also eventually electrified.

=== 1999 Linking Victoria ===
A strategy launched in 1999 by the state government of Steve Bracks called for an airport rail link to Melbourne Airport and the reopening of several regional railway lines.

=== 2008 Victorian Transport Plan ===
The government of John Brumby responded to a major increase in rail patronage by releasing a plan in 2008 that called for a number of rail extensions, including the Regional Rail Link from west of Werribee to Southern Cross station, a new inner-city rail tunnel called the Melbourne Metro Rail Project, and electrification of the rail network to South Morang (completed in 2011), Sunbury (completed in 2012), Melton and Cranbourne East.

=== 2013 Network Development Plan: Metropolitan Rail (NDPMR) ===
New government agency Public Transport Victoria (PTV) released a detailed 20-year rail development plan in 2013 under the government of Denis Napthine. The report outlined a major expansion of the metropolitan rail network in Melbourne over a number of stages, with the goals of introducing a 'metro-style system' and extending the reach of the network. Significant projects identified for construction included the Metro Tunnel, the Airport rail link, a line to Doncaster, a line to Rowville, a second underground inner-city rail tunnel, and many rail electrification and duplication projects.

=== 2025 Infrastructure Victoria Plan ===
Infrastructure Victoria released a 30-year plan for improvements to Victoria's existing infrastructure. The plan called for electrification of the Ballarat line as far as Melton, and the building of new stations at Altona North, Thornhill Park and Mount Atkinson.

== Extensions under construction ==
Diagram showing Melbourne's rail network, including former lines and lines currently in planning or construction.

=== Airport rail link ===
A rail link to Melbourne Airport has been proposed repeatedly since the airport's construction, with a variety of routes and service models suggested, but construction has never commenced. In July 2018, the Federal and State Governments each pledged A$5 billion (for a total of A$10 billion) to construct a rail link. The Federal Government proposed four preferred routes for the link, with one proposal running via a direct tunnel to Highpoint Shopping Centre and the others linking to existing stations in Broadmeadows, Flemington or Sunshine. An assessment of the four preferred routes conducted by Rail Projects Victoria culminated in the route via Sunshine station being selected, with a detailed business case expected by 2020. Construction began in 2022, but paused in May 2023 due to a Federal government review of major infrastructure projects.

On the 8th of July 2024, Melbourne Airport completed longstanding negotiations with the Victorian Government over the station's location following the appointment of a mediator. Melbourne Airport have agreed to have the station above ground, with a hope to resume discussions to finalise the station's design, the construction timeline and redress for the land required for the above-ground option, with a new targeted opening date of 2033.

=== Suburban Rail Loop ===
In August 2018, in the run-up to the 2018 Victorian state election, the State Government pledged $300 million to complete a business case and secure funding to construct a new railway through suburban Melbourne. The project is designed to link major activity centres and amenities such as hospitals, shopping centres, universities, and Melbourne Airport. The proposal would connect most existing railway lines through middle suburbs and enable easier intra-suburban travel.

The Suburban Rail Loop (SRL) would connect the existing station at Cheltenham (Note: Although SRL East is consistently advertised as running from Cheltenham to Box Hill, the line will actually run from Southland station, located in the suburb of Cheltenham.) with other existing stations at Clayton, Glen Waverley, Box Hill, Heidelberg, Reservoir, Fawkner, Broadmeadows, Sunshine and Werribee. It will also link to new stations to be built in areas that have long been promised rail connections, including Monash University, Burwood, Doncaster, Bundoora and Melbourne Airport. Construction on the first stage, SRL East, began in 2022 and is set to open by 2035.

== Currently planned extensions ==
=== Electrification to Melton and Wyndham Vale ===
Electrification of the Deer Park – West Werribee line to Wyndham Vale was included in the 2013 Network Development Plan – Metropolitan Rail (NDPMR) by the government agency Public Transport Victoria, along with quadruplication to provide express tracks for Geelong services. The plan also called for the electrification of the Ballarat line as far as Melton. Several additional stations have been proposed for an electrified Wyndham Vale line, at locations including Truganina, Sayers Road, Davis Road and Black Forest Road.

During the 2018 Victorian state election, the State Government announced its Western Rail Plan, which would quadruplicate and electrify the rail lines to Melton and Wyndham Vale, allowing Metro services. Under this plan, Metro and V/Line regional services would be separated, allowing for higher speed trains to be introduced to Geelong and Ballarat. The plan would electrify the track to Wyndham Vale opened in 2015 as part of the Regional Rail Link. New tracks between Sunshine and Southern Cross Station to be built as part of the Airport rail link could add extra capacity for metro and regional trains. Planning for faster regional rail and electrification of the lines to Melton and Wyndham Vale will occur alongside planning for the Airport rail link, with construction set to start by 2022.

Under the 2025 Infrastructure Victoria plan, the electrification of the Melton line would involve two new stations at Paynes Road in Thornhill Park and Hopkins Road in Mount Atkinson being built.

=== Extension to Clyde ===
Various proposals have been made to extend the Cranbourne line to the growth suburb of Clyde by rebuilding part of the closed South Gippsland line. Construction on a project to duplicate the Cranbourne line between Dandenong and Cranbourne began in 2020, with an extension to Clyde to follow on its completion. In September 2019 the State Government announced the timeline for duplication as part of a $1bn package named the "Cranbourne Line Upgrade". The package includes the removal of the four remaining level crossing on the line, the duplication of 8 km of track, and the rebuilding of Merinda Park Station. The project began in 2020, with duplication completed in 2022 and the level crossing removals planned to be completed by 2024, allowing a ten minutes service frequency to Cranbourne and facilitating an eventual extension to Clyde.

== Other proposals ==
=== Melbourne Metro 2 ===
There have been various proposals for a successor to the Metro Tunnel, with the main proposal linking the Mernda and Werribee lines via a new tunnel between Clifton Hill and Newport. This proposal was first identified by PTV in the 2013 NDPMR. The new Parkville station to be built as part of the Metro Tunnel has been designed with provision for future expansion to an interchange with the second Metro Tunnel. Melbourne City Council has advocated for the tunnel, which could include stations at Fitzroy, Parkville, Flagstaff, Southern Cross and multiple stations at the urban renewal precinct Fishermans Bend. The tunnel was included in 2018 as part of the State Government's 30-year strategy for Fisherman's Bend, with two stations in the precinct, and has been backed by the independent planning agency Infrastructure Victoria in its 30-year infrastructure plan for the state released in 2021.

=== Melbourne Metro 3 ===
In 2018, a paper released by Melbourne City Council as part of its Transport Strategy refresh called for a third cross-city rail tunnel to be built by 2035. The council called for a stand-alone metro line running from Melbourne Airport to Maribyrnong, Arden Macaulay, Southern Cross, Parliament then east of the CBD to Richmond, Kew, Doncaster and Ringwood.

=== Western suburbs ===
==== Sunbury line ====
- In the 2020s, transport planners in the Melton council have suggested the construction of a station at the Calder Park Raceway, alongside which the railway line runs.

==== Werribee line ====
- Extension of the Werribee line to meet the Deer Park – West Werribee line at Wyndham Vale was proposed in the 2013 NDPMR. The concept was later included in plans for the Suburban Rail Loop.
- Additional stations have been proposed for the Werribee line at Derrimut Road and Werribee South.

==== Avalon Airport ====
- Prior to the 2010 Victorian state election, then-Opposition Leader Ted Baillieu promised to begin construction in his first term on an extension of the passenger rail line to Avalon Airport in Melbourne's South-West. The plan would have seen a single-line track branch off from the Melbourne-Geelong rail line. Despite the Napthine Government revealing a preferred option for the link in 2014, the proposal never progressed to construction. In 2018, Geelong Council called for a link to Avalon Airport as part of a future high-speed rail line to Geelong.
- Avalon Airport management acknowledge that current patronage cannot justify a rail branch to the airport. Their preference now is for an "Avalon Airport" station to be provided on the existing Melbourne to Geelong rail line, from which passengers would be transported, using an unspecified type of people mover, on the four-kilometre journey to the airport terminal. This would be using the corridor set aside for the airport rail branch. The project was likened to London Luton DART which is an automated people mover that connects the closest station (Luton Airport Parkway) over a 2.1 km distance to the airport. Treasurer Tim Pallas

=== Northern suburbs ===
==== Albion–Jacana line ====
- In 2008, the Greens proposed standalone electrification of the Albion-Jacana railway line, with new passenger stations at Sunshine North, Keilor East, Westfield Shoppingtown, Airport West and Gowanbrae.

==== Craigieburn line ====
- The 2013 PTV NDPMR proposed electrification of the Craigieburn line as far as Wallan.

==== Upfield line ====
- The construction of a branch line was proposed between Flemington Bridge Station and Pascoe Vale Station in the early 1890s as a means of reducing Melbourne's rising unemployment rate. Three stations were planned, tentatively named Bent Town, Munroville and La Rose.
- A spur line branching from the Upfield line along the former Inner Circle rail easement to Princes Park, was proposed by the Public Transport Users Association in 1991, primarily as a means of transporting sports fans to the football ground.
- The PTV NDPMR proposed re-activating the former connection between Upfield and the Craigieburn line at Somerton. Such a project, in conjunction with duplication of the Upfield line, would enable diversion of Seymour and Shepparton services away from the at-capacity Craigieburn line, and provide additional capacity for electrification to Wallan. A business case is expected to be complete in 2019.

=== North-eastern suburbs ===
==== Doncaster line ====
- A variety of proposals for railway lines to the suburb of Doncaster have been made since the mid-20th century, although none have commenced construction. The City of Manningham is the only metropolitan Melbourne council area not served by a heavy rail line, and most proposals have envisaged a junction with the Hurstbridge and Mernda lines near Clifton Hill. Public transport advocates have claimed that the most frequently proposed route, along the median of the Eastern Freeway, will be jeopardised by construction of the North East Link, permanently precluding construction of the rail line. However, construction authorities have stated that the reservation will continue to be suitable.

==== Hurstbridge line ====
- An extension of the Hurstbridge line to East Reservoir, was proposed in the 1950s as a means of opening up the area east of High Street towards Darebin Creek for residential development. The proposed route was a branch line from Alphington station to East Reservoir. The proposed line consisted of five stations and several bridges which meant that the line would not interfere with any road traffic. The proposed cost was approximately £250,000.
- A new Eltham North station, between the existing Eltham and Diamond Creek stations, has been proposed to provide improved access for local residents. However, the proposal has been criticised due to its potential to encourage urban sprawl in undeveloped areas.

=== Eastern suburbs ===
==== Lilydale line ====
- Extension of the Lilydale line to Coldstream station by re-electrifying part of the closed Healesville line was first proposed in the 1969 Melbourne Transportation Plan. Yarra Ranges Council provided for a new station and stabling yard in Coldstream with its 2015 precinct structure plan, but cited advice from PTV that the extension was unlikely to occur. The reservation has now been used for the Yarra Valley trail, which connects Lilydale to Yering Station along the old rail corridor.
- An additional station at Cave Hill, between Mooroolbark and Lilydale, has been proposed by Yarra Ranges Council to support residential development in the area.

==== Rowville ====
- A railway line to the suburb of Rowville has been proposed repeatedly since its appearance in the 1969 Melbourne Transportation Plan, and was included in the PTV Network Development Plan. A 2012 feasibility study and a 2016 Infrastructure Victoria report rejected the project as a poor use of funds, but public transport advocates continue to favour a heavy rail line, particularly to serve the nearby Monash University campus. In 2018 the State Government instead proposed a light rail service along the route. It was expected to have a business case complete by 2019, though that year local councils expressed concern the project had stalled.

==== Knox ====
- In their 2018 Melbourne Rail Plan, the Rail Futures Institute proposed an underground extension of the Glen Waverley line to Knox City in Wantirna South.

==== Alamein line ====
- The 1940 Ashworth Improvement Plan identified future works to extend the Alamein line to East Malvern.
- Extending the Alamein line to Oakleigh, along the old Outer Circle line reservation, primarily to serve Chadstone Shopping Centre.
- A proposal made by Stuart James includes a potential extension to Chadstone Shopping Centre to go to Huntingdale, then the median strip in North Road to Monash University, Clayton campus, Notting Hill, Wheelers Hill, Mulgrave, Scoresby, Rowville, Lysterfield, and terminating at Ferntree Gully railway station in the Belgrave Line. This proposal has been considered another alternative to the long-proposed but unbuilt Rowville railway line

=== South-eastern suburbs ===
==== South-East Fast Line ====
- In their 2018 Melbourne Rail Plan, the Rail Futures Institute proposed that by 2035 a new express line should be built from Southern Cross to Caulfield, Chadstone, Monash, Dandenong and Pakenham, with new stations at Chadstone and Monash.

==== Beaumaris line ====
- Beaumaris railway line, a 1954 report by the Melbourne & Metropolitan Board of Works proposed a branch line from Moorabbin to Beaumaris, which included four stations, including stations at Bay Road and Cheltenham Road.

==== Frankston and Stony Point line ====
- Extending the Frankston line to Hastings or Baxter by electrifying part of the Stony Point line has been proposed to different extents at different times.

==== Electrification to Baxter ====
In 2019, the State Government completed a business case for electrification and extension of the Frankston line to Baxter station in Melbourne's south, due for completion in 2019. In November 2019 the business case was delivered to the Federal Government. The plan included electrification of the line with two stations, Baxter and Leawarra station near Monash University Peninsula Campus. The business case included other enhancements, such as track duplication, level crossing removals, station upgrades, car parking and train stabling. The Federal Government committed $225 million towards the project in its 2017-2018 budget. However due to the federal government review regarding spending on major infrastructure projects, in November 2023 it was announced that project funding was subsequently axed.

==== Pakenham and Cranbourne line ====
- The Public Transport Users' Association has proposed re-opening the General Motors railway station which closed in July 2002. Both platforms and the footbridge above the station remain but would require repairs and resurfacing or replacement, while the building and other fixtures would have to be demolished and new facilities built. PTV instead argues that land use in the area does not demand construction of a passenger station.

=== Southern suburbs ===
==== St Kilda line ====
Although the St Kilda Line has been converted to light rail operation and is now part of Melbourne's tram network, several proposals for rail extensions existed throughout its working life.

- Various proposals have existed to extend the St Kilda line to Elwood.
  - In 1857, a proposal was brought forward to bring the Gippsland Railway into Melbourne via Elsternwick, Elwood and St Kilda.
  - In 1882, an Albert Park to Elwood Railway was listed on that year's Railway Construction Bill. Despite public support, the Elwood line was later deleted as it was felt that the area was already well served by public transport.
  - During 1884, William Ross developed plans to extend the St Kilda line to his Rosstown Railway via Elwood. Two routes, a Sea Beach and inland Melbourne Extension were proposed.
  - The 1940 Ashworth Improvement Plan identified future works to extend the St Kilda south easterly to Elwood. These included a tunnel under Fitzroy Street and 3 stations.
- In 1954 the Melbourne & Metropolitan Board of Works released their Planning Scheme for Melbourne which contained a new station on Southbank and a direct route to Spencer Street station.
- In 1970, the Tewksbury Symposium, a group of Melbourne University academics, proposed a "by-pass" line from the Glen Waverley railway via Caulfield and Elsternwick, to link up with the St Kilda line. The proposal was framed as part of an alternative scheme to the Melbourne Underground Loop.

== See also ==
- Proposed Melbourne tram extensions
- Rail Projects Victoria
