= Network Development Plan – Metropolitan Rail =

The Network Development Plan – Metropolitan Rail was a long-term development plan for the rail network of Melbourne, Australia. It was written by Public Transport Victoria (PTV) and released to the public on 27 March 2013 under the Napthine government and received minor updates in 2016.

Similar plans were intended to be released for regional rail, trams and buses. However, only the metropolitan rail aspect of the plan was released to the public by PTV. The Regional Network Development Plan was released by the Victorian Department of Transport in 2016.

The primary aim of the metropolitan rail plan was to improve the efficiency, reliability and patronage of Melbourne's train network and transition it towards a rapid transit system. It set out a number of goals over four stages, to be carried out over 20 years. Then-CEO of PTV Ian Dobbs (whose contract was not renewed in 2015) estimated the whole plan would cost about $30 billion.

In 2019 PTV was abolished as an independent, statutory government body and absorbed into the Victorian Department of Transport. The plan was influential on Melbourne's transport planning but does not represent current government policy.

== Background ==
The Public Transport Development Authority, later trading as Public Transport Victoria, was established by the Victorian government under Premier Ted Baillieu with the intent of, among other things, planning and improving the operations of the rail network.

== Plan ==
Below is the initial timeline of Stages 1–4 of the Network Development Plan of Metropolitan Rail which was released in 2013

=== Stage 1: (Timeline 2012 – 2016) ===
This stage outlined immediate high priority goals to overcome urgent constraints, with a targeted completion date of 2016. All projects listed in Stage 1 had been completed in 2022.

Line(s)	Project name	Status	Starting date	Completion date	Notes
Geelong / Ballarat / Bendigo	Regional Rail Link (including new stations at Tarneit and Wyndham Vale)	Completed	2013	2015	Plans to electrify Wyndham Vale Line.
Mernda	Extension of the Epping line to South Morang	Completed	2010	2012	Line was later extended to Mernda in August 2018.
Sunbury	Electrification of Bendigo line to Sunbury	Completed	2010	2012	
Geelong	Construction of Grovedale station in Grovedale (Geelong) on the Warrnambool Line	Completed	2014	2014	Renamed to Waurn Ponds.
Werribee	Construction of Williams Landing station in Point Cook on the Werribee line	Completed	2012	2013	
Frankston	Construction of Southland station adjacent to Westfield Southland on the Frankston line	Completed	2016	2017	
Cranbourne	Construction of Lynbrook station in Lynbrook on the Cranbourne line	Completed	2010	2012	
Pakenham	Construction of Cardinia Road station in Pakenham on the Pakenham line	Completed	2010	2012	
Ballarat	Construction of Caroline Springs station in Ravenhall on the Ballarat line	Completed	2016	2017	Initially construction started on a single platform station; scope expanded to double platform station after Melton duplication announced
Hurstbridge	Hurstbridge line upgrade and new stabling facility at Eltham station	Completed	2012	2013	Included improved signalling between Eltham and Hurstbridge
Pakenham / Cranbourne	Order 33 High Capacity Metro Trains	Completed	2016	2016	65 trains ordered in September 2016
Sandringham	High capacity signalling trial on the Sandringham line	Completed	2020	2022	Trial announced for South Morang line in July 2017
	7 X'Trapolis 100 trains	Completed	2015	2017	5 trains ordered in March 2015; 5 trains ordered in April 2016; 9 trains ordered in February 2017; 5 trains ordered in May 2018
	40 VLocity carriages	Completed	2015	2018	21 carriages ordered in May 2015; 27 carriages April 2016; 27 carriages in December 2017

=== Stage 2: (Timeline 2016 – 2022) ===
The second stage focused on creating a "metro-style" system by segregating operations and creating end-to-end lines, with a targeted completion date of 2022. It is expected that most projects in stage 2 will be completed by 2025.

Line(s)	Project name	Status	Starting date	Completion date	Notes
Sunbury / Cranbourne / Pakenham	Metro Tunnel	Completed	2015	2025	Includes a turn back platform at West Footscray station. Completion date is moved from 2026 to 2025. The Metro Tunnel opened to the public on 30 November 2025 and is fully operational as of 1 February 2026.
Ballarat	Duplication of the Serviceton line between Caroline Springs and Melton	Completed	2017	2021	Includes upgrades of stations and passing loops along the Ballarat line.
Cranbourne / Pakenham	Upgrades to the Dandenong rail corridor, including grade separations and signalling works	Completed	2016	2018	
Hurstbridge	Duplication of the Hurstbridge line from Heidelberg to Rosanna	Completed	2017	2018	Done in conjunction with Level Crossing Removal Project.
	Delivery of initial order of 33 High Capacity Metro Trains, and the further order and delivery of 70 trains.	Completed	2016	2024	65 trains ordered in September 2016. Extended order to 70 trains in May 2021 for Airport rail link. Trains have been delivered, but Airport rail link continues to be paused.
Ballarat	Construction of Cobblebank station near Melton	Completed	2017	2019	
Wyndham Vale	New railway station at Black Forest Road near Wyndham Vale	Early Planning	2018	TBC	Part of the Western Rail Plan. Western Rail Plan has not commenced past the early planning stage as of 2025.
	Major timetabling and operational changes to the network	Underway	2026	2026	Announced to take place in 2026.
Sandringham / Mernda / Hurstbridge / Sunbury	Installation of high-capacity signalling on Sandringham, Mernda & Hurstbridge lines and between Sunbury and South Yarra stations	Underway	2020	TBC	High-capacity signalling planned to be installed between West Footscray and Westall via Metro Tunnel. High-capacity signalling planned to be extended from West Footscray to Ginifer when Airport rail link opens. High-capacity signalling not planned for Sandringham, Mernda and Hurstbridge lines.

=== Stage 3: (Timeline 2022 – 2027) ===
This stage focuses on extending the network to growth areas and suburbs without railway access, and utilising the preceding growth in capacity. It is to be completed within 15 years, before 2027.

Some projects are planned to happen in the next decade. Some projects may be built in a different form of transit, such as Rowville line becoming a possible light rail corridor or Doncaster line becoming a proper bus rapid transit corridor.

Implementation of HCS across the network is uncertain as of 2023.

Project name	Status	Starting date	Completion date	Notes
Melbourne Airport Rail Line	Planning	2022	Late 2033	PTV Airport Rail Link study released in 2013 supported an Albion alignment. Federal government has committed another $2 billion for the project, with early works to begin near Sunshine station. Victorian government, the Commonwealth and Melbourne Airport have formally committed to building Airport rail via the Albion alignment. Completion date set to no earlier than late 2033 following lengthy negotiations between the Victorian government and Melbourne Airport regarding station placement.
Doncaster Line				Doncaster Rail study completed in 2014 showed preferred rail alignment. Excluded in the revised plan.
Rowville Line				Rowville study was completed in 2014, showing preferred alignment. Light Rail to Rowville is currently being planned, however has been put on pause due to the Suburban rail loop stage 1 taking priority. Currently moved into Stage 6 of the revised plan
Melbourne Metro 2: A new tunnel between Clifton Hill & Southern Cross via Parkville				Doncaster Rail study addressed the need for this future tunnel Currently split differently in the new revised plan in stages 4/5
Electrification of the Serviceton Line from Sunshine to Melton	Early Planning	2018	TBC	Part of the Western Rail Plan. Western Rail Plan has not commenced past the early planning stage as of 2024. Upgrades to Sunshine station, set to be completed by 2030, will prepare the Melton line for future electrification.
Electrification of the Stony Point Line from Frankston to Baxter station				Business case released by both State and Federal governments. State government decided not to proceed with the project.
Duplication of the Cranbourne Line from Dandenong to Cranbourne	Completed	2018	2021	Construction brought forward to Stage 2 and being built in conjunction with Level Crossing Removal Project
Duplication of the Hurstbridge Line from Greensborough to Eltham	Completed	2018	2023	950m of duplication from East of Montmorency station no longer being constructed to conserve endangered Eltham copper butterfly habitat and construction brought forward to Stage 2 of the Plan
A Brand New Railway Station on Sayers Road in Tarneit	Early planning	2018	TBC	Part of the Western Rail Plan. Western Rail Plan has not commenced past the early planning stage as of 2024. West Tarneit Station, near corner of Leakes and Davis Roads, is set to open in 2026. Additional stations to Wyndham Vale (e.g Sayers Road, Black Forest Road) have not yet been announced.
A Brand New Railway Station in Truganina	Planning	2022	TBC	Committed funding for early planning works for Truganina station in late 2022
Order and Deliver of High Capacity Metro Trains	Complete	2021	2024	
High Capacity Signalling (Northern and Cross-City groups)				Uncertain about expansion of HCS outside the Metro Tunnel corridors.

=== Stage 4: (Timeline 2027 – 2032) ===
The final stage involves further utilisation of extra capacity and preparing for future growth in Melbourne. The stage is to be carried out within 20 years, before 2032.

The reconfiguration of the metropolitan rail network will create seven independently operated lines similar to other rapid transit systems

Some projects listed are planned to be completed in the next decade but are still in their early stages. As of April 2018, most details about these projects are still unknown.

Project name	Status	Start date	Completion date	Notes
Quadruplication of the Lilydale line between Burnley and Camberwell				Currently moved into stage 3 of the revised plan as part of the Burnley Junction Rationalisation
Duplication of the Lilydale line between Mooroolbark and Lilydale				Currently moved into stage 3 of the revised plan
Duplication of the Werribee line between the Altona Loop/Werribee Junction and Seaholme				The loop has been partially duplicated as part of the Kororoit Creek Level Crossing Removal project. Feasibility study was completed in 2018.
Electrification of the Warrnambool Railway Line from Sunshine to Geelong				Currently moved into stage 5 of the revised plan
Electrification of the North East line from Craigieburn to Wallan				
Extension of the South Morang line from South Morang to Mernda	Completed	2015	2018	Includes 2 new stations at Middle Gorge and Hawkstowe.
Extension of the South Morang line to Fishermans Bend, with the Future potential to extend the railway in a tunnel under the Yarra River to Newport as the Metro Tunnel 2 Project				Currently split differently in the new revised plan in stages 4/5
Reconfiguration of the City Loop				Currently moved into stage 3 of the revised plan, will be done on completion on Metro 1
High Capacity Signaling (Frankston and Glen Waverley/Alamein Groups)				
Extension from Werribee to Wyndham Vale	Early Planning	2018	TBC	Part of the Western Rail Plan. Western Rail Plan has not commenced past the early planning stage as of 2024.

== 2018 Transport for Victoria Plan ==
In October 2018, a Victorian Rail Plan prepared by Transport for Victoria (TFV) was leaked to the press, containing a similar staged approach to the PTV NDMPR. The plan, released during the campaign for that year's state election, caused some controversy, as government policy announcements did not align with the strategic priorities identified in the plan. The Suburban Rail Loop, in particular, did not appear, and the TFV plan was further criticised for failing to prioritise meaningful service increases for regional corridors in the earlier stages of the plan. Government representatives argued that the plan was an "internal working document" and not representative of government policy; Opposition politicians contended that the plan was representative of the government's priorities.

=== Metro Tunnel Day One ===
The first stage of the TFV plan had an intended completion date of 2025, aligning with the start of service on the Metro Tunnel. Some of the projects are under construction.

Project name	Status	Starting date	Completion date	Notes
Metro Tunnel	Completed	2018	2025	Includes a turn back platform at West Footscray station. Completion date is moved from 2026 to 2025. The Metro Tunnel opened to the public on 30 November 2025 and is fully operational as of 1 February 2026.
Cranbourne Line Duplication	Completed	2021	2022	
Somerton Link (connecting Upfield Line to Craigieburn and Seymour lines)	TBD			
Hurstbridge Line Upgrade Stage 2 (between Greensborough and Eltham)	Completed	2018	2023	950m of duplication from East of Montmorency station no longer being constructed to conserve endangered Eltham copper butterfly habitat
City Loop Reconfiguration	TBD			

=== Revised Plan Stages 3-6 ===
==== Stage 3: (Timeline 2022 – 2027) ====
Project name	Status	Starting date	Completion date	Notes
Melbourne Airport Rail Link	Planning	2022	Late 2033	PTV Airport Rail Link study released in 2013 supported an Albion alignment. Federal government has committed another $2 billion for the project, with early works to begin near Sunshine station. Victorian government, the Commonwealth and Melbourne Airport have formally committed to building Airport rail via the Albion alignment. Completion date set to no earlier than late 2033 following lengthy negotiations between the Victorian government and Melbourne Airport regarding station placement.
Burnley Junction Rationalisation	TBD			Would separate Glen Waverley and Ringwood down trains permanently, allowing usage of the corridor to its full potential
Melton Electrification and Quadruplication	Early Planning	2018	TBC	Part of the Western Rail Plan. Western Rail Plan has not commenced past the early planning stage as of 2025. Upgrades to Sunshine station, set to be completed by 2030, will prepare the Melton line for future electrification.
Wyndham Vale Electrification and Quadruplication	Early Planning	2018	TBC	Part of the Western Rail Plan. Western Rail Plan has not commenced past the early planning stage as of 2025.
Waurn Ponds Duplication (between South Geelong and Waurn Ponds)	Construction	2022	2024	
Extension of Cranbourne line to Clyde	Early Planning	2018	TBC	Business case underway and has not been released yet as of 2023.
Electrification of Stony Point line to Baxter	TBD			Business case released by both State and Federal Governments. Federal funding axed in November 2023.
Duplication between Mooroolbark and Lilydale	TBD			
Shepparton Line Upgrade - Stage 2	Completed	2021	2022	A stage 3 was added to the project which was completed in 2023.
Bendigo Line Upgrade	Construction	2020	2023	

==== Stage 4: (Timeline 2027 – 2032) ====
Project name	Status	Start date	Completion date	Notes
Melbourne Metro 2 - Western section (Tunnel from Newport to Parkville via Fishermans Bend and Southern Cross)	TBD			
Laverton and Williamstown line upgrades	TBD			
Extension of Wyndham Vale line to Black Forest Road and connection with Werribee line	Early Planning	2018	TBC	Part of the Western Rail Plan. Western Rail Plan has not commenced past the early planning stage as of 2025.
Quadruplication from Sunshine to Watergardens	TBD			
Electrification of Upfield line to Wallan via Somerton	TBD			

==== Stage 5 ====
A timeframe for Stage 5 has not been published.

Project name	Status	Start date	Completion date	Notes
Melbourne Metro 2 - Eastern section				
New Branch from Mernda Line at Lalor to Wollert				
Electrification of Geelong line				
Additional stations on Deer Park–West Werribee railway line				West Tarneit Station, near corner of Leakes and Davis Roads, is set to open in 2026. Additional stations to Wyndham Vale (e.g Sayers Road, Black Forest Road) have not yet been announced.
Barwon South West Line Intercity Upgrade				
Gippsland Line Intercity Upgrade				
Loddon Mallee Line Intercity Upgrade				

==== Stage 6 ====
A timeframe for Stage 6 has not been published.

Project date	Status	Start date	Completion date	Notes
Additional Track Pair between South Yarra and Caulfield				
Additional Track Pair from Caulfield to Huntingdale				
New Branch Line to Rowville				
Additional Track Pair from Huntingdale to Dandenong				
Additional Track Pair from Deer Park to Melton				
Duplication from Bacchus Marsh to Ballarat				
Additional Track Pair from Flinders Street to Southern Cross				

== See also ==
- Victorian Transport Plan
- List of Victoria Government infrastructure plans, proposals, and studies
