= Rockbank railway station =

Railway station in Melbourne, Australia

Rockbank
- Westbound view from Platform 1, October 2026

General information
- Location: Leakes Road, Rockbank, Victoria 3335; City of Melton; Australia
- Coordinates: 37°43′45″S 144°39′03″E
- System: PTV regional rail station
- Owner: VicTrack
- Operator: V/Line
- Lines: Ballarat Ararat Maryborough (Ararat)
- Distance: 30.2 kilometres from Southern Cross
- Platforms: 2 side
- Tracks: 2
- Connections: Bus

Construction
- Structure type: Ground
- Parking: 350
- Cycle facilities: Yes
- Accessible: Yes

Other information
- Status: Operational, unstaffed
- Station code: RBK
- Fare zone: Myki Zone 2
- Website: Public Transport Victoria

History
- Opened: 2 April 1884; 142 years ago
- Rebuilt: 26 August 2019
- Former names: Mount Atkinson (1884-1889)

Passengers
- 2013–2014: 6,477
- 2014–2015: 7,469 ▲15.31%
- 2015–2016: 10,019 ▲34.14%
- 2016–2017: 19,312 ▲92.75%
- 2017–2018: Not measured
- 2018–2019: 41,450 ▲114.63%
- 2019–2020: 57,650 ▲39.08%
- 2020–2021: 57,900 ▲0.43%
- 2021–2022: 101,150 ▲74.69%
- 2022–2023: 212,850 ▲110.43%
- 2023–2024: 328,050 ▲54.12%

Services
Preceding station	V/Line	Following station
Caroline Springs towards Southern Cross	Ballarat line	Cobblebank towards Wendouree
Caroline Springs towards Southern Cross	Melton line	Cobblebank towards Melton or Bacchus Marsh
Caroline Springs towards Southern Cross	Ararat line	Cobblebank towards Ararat
Caroline Springs towards Southern Cross	Maryborough line	Cobblebank towards Maryborough
Track layout
Location

Rockbank railway station is a regional railway station on the Ararat line, located in the western suburb of Rockbank, in Melbourne, Victoria, Australia. The station initially opened as Mount Atkinson on 2 April 1884, then it was given its current name of Rockbank in November 1889.

The station is an unstaffed, ground-level station, featuring two side platforms. The current station was provided in 2019 by the Regional Rail Revival project. The station is accessible, utilising a pedestrian overpass, lifts, and ramps for platform access.

Rockbank station serves the Ballarat and Ararat lines, which are part of V/Line's regional passenger network. The journey to Southern Cross railway station, the hub of the V/Line railway network, is approximately 30.2 kilometres (18.8 mi).

== Description ==
Rockbank station is at Leakes Road, Melbourne, a major road which forms the station's eastern boundary. A level crossing is also present. The station is located near Rockbank's primary school, general store, and housing estates. The state government agency VicTrack owns the station, and it is primarily operated by V/Line. It is approximately 30.2 kilometres (18.8 mi) away from Southern Cross railway station. The adjacent stations are Caroline Springs station up towards Melbourne and Cobblebank station down towards Ballarat or Ararat.

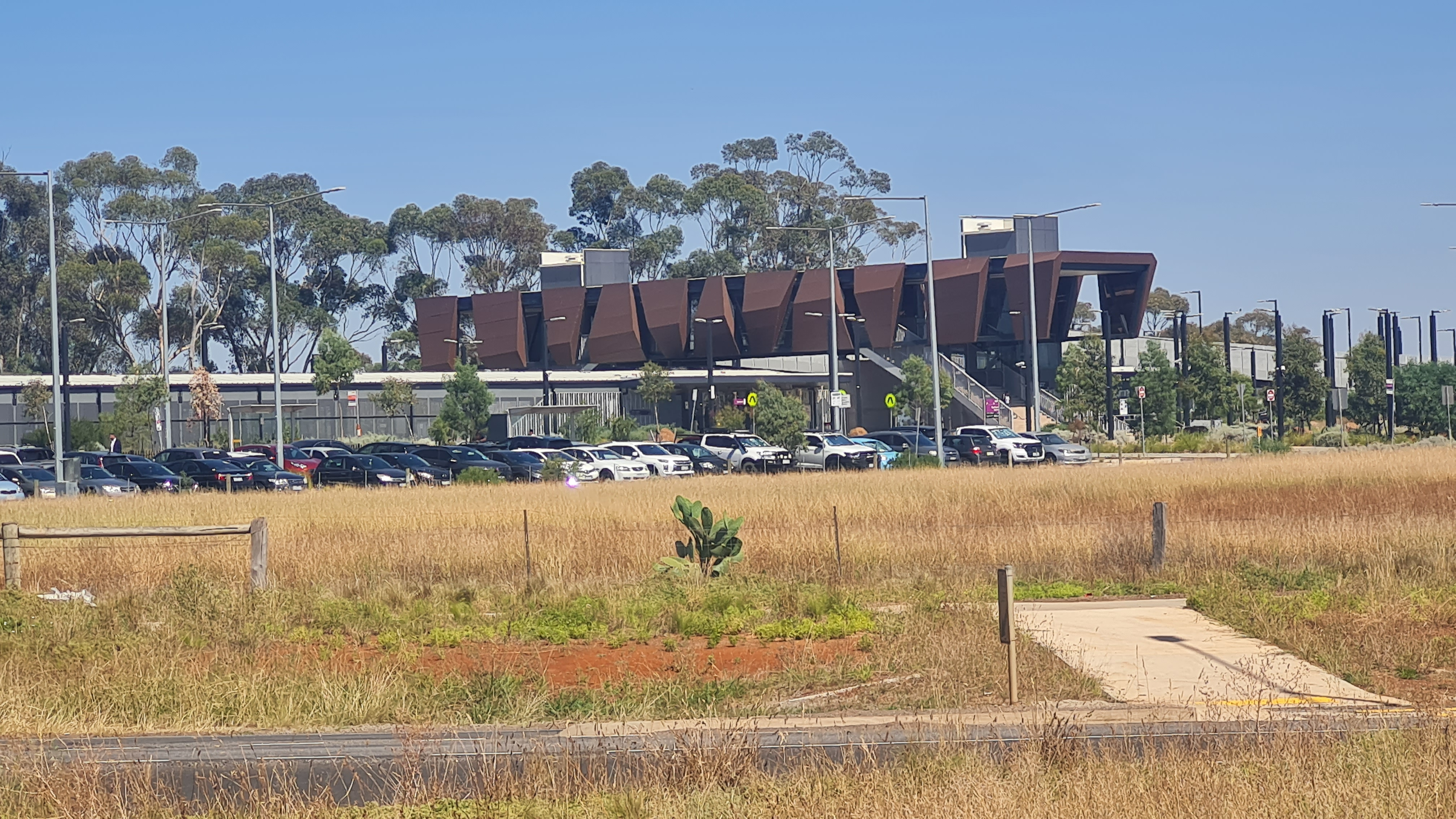
Outside view of Rockbank Station looking at station car park and concourse in the distance

The station consists of two side platforms with a total of two platform edges. A pedestrian bridge links the two platforms, delivered by Kyriacou Architects and SMEC Holdings. The bridge's brown colour represents the earth surrounding the station.

The current station is entirely different from its original state, as both platforms were demolished for the new station's construction in 2018. The station has 350 car parking spaces and 26 bike cage facilities (known as Parkiteers). To meet accessibility needs, the station has lifts and ramps.

== History ==
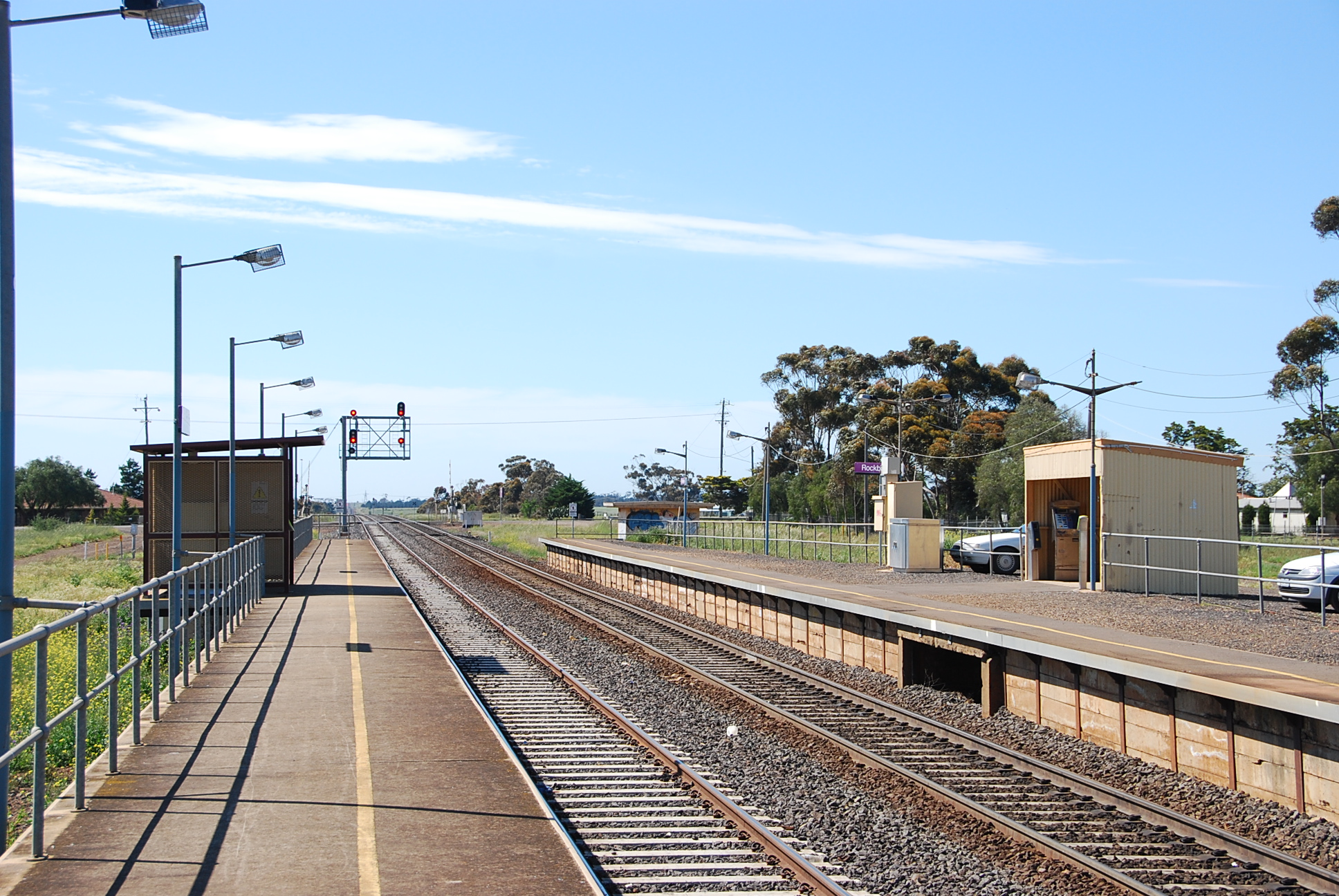
Old Rockbank station before its demolition for the Regional Rail Revival project, October 2010

=== Original station ===
The station opened as Mount Atkinson on 2 April 1884, as part of the extension of the Serviceton line, and was renamed Rockbank in 1889. The station was established to serve the local farming communities of Rockbank. Being on a single track railway line, it was used as a crossing loop, and continued to be used as such until 2021, when the single-track section between Deer Park West and Melton was converted to dual track.

By 1914, the station had a rail yard with three tracks. The south track housed the passenger platform, and the north track had a goods shed. The station's signal box was interlocked. With a chaff mill established in 1908, and a recreation reserve located nearby, the station became the focus of the Rockbank community.

In 1960, the crossing loop was extended to accommodate trains up to 730 metres long, and a short platform was provided on the loop road. In 1976, Centralised Traffic Control was provided on the line from Sunshine to Rockbank. The same year, flashing light signals were provided at the Leakes Road level crossing, located nearby in the up direction of the station. By the 1970s, the mill siding was no longer in use. The station building was later demolished c. 1985. A year later, in 1986, the yard was simplified to two tracks: a main line and a crossing loop. In 1990, the mechanical signals and switches were removed, and replaced by Automatic and Track Control. A new platform, parallel to the size of the southbound platform, was provided in 1993. It replaced the original short platform which was located on the passing loop.

In 2002, boom barriers were provided at the Leakes Road level crossing. In 2005, control of the signals was transferred to the Ballarat signal box, as part of the Regional Fast Rail project. Between 2015–2019, at least six crashes occurred at the Leakes Road level crossing, with 2 serious collisions and 8 injuries.

=== Reconstructed station ===
In March 2018, work began on the reconstruction of the station as part of the Regional Rail Revival project. The station upgrade was managed by Kyriacou Architects and SMEC Holdings, in partnership with Lendlease and Coleman Rail. The side platforms were rebuilt to fit six-carriage VLocity trains, and an accessible pedestrian overpass was installed over the tracks, accessed by lifts, ramps and stairs. Other new facilities included a car park with capacity for up to 350 cars, a bus interchange, secure bike storage areas (Parkiteers), and drop-off zones.

On 26 August 2019, the rebuilt station was opened to passengers. Following the upgrade, there was a 114.63% increase in passenger movements at the station. This increased patronage has led to some media attention, with particular concerns being raised that there is insufficient parking.

On 2 December 2019, Transit Systems Victoria commenced operation of a bus route via Rockbank station, connecting it to the suburb of Aintree.

The station is set to be integrated into the metropolitan railway network, as part of the rail electrification from Sunshine railway station to Melton under the Western Rail Plan. However, there have been no confirmations regarding the integration since the announcement in 2018.

== Platforms and services ==
Rockbank has two side platforms. It is served by V/Line Ballarat and Ararat line trains. The Ballarat line runs between Ballarat railway station and Southern Cross railway station in the Melbourne CBD. The Ararat line takes a similar route, but continues beyond Ballarat to Ararat railway station.

Rockbank platform arrangement
Platform	Line	Destination	Service Type
1	Ballarat line Ararat line Maryborough line	Southern Cross	Maryborough line: One daily V/Line service
2	Ballarat line Ararat line	Melton, Bacchus Marsh, Wendouree, Ararat	

== Transport links ==
Rockbank station has an accessible bus interchange with six bus bays. The bus interchange also serves as a train replacement coach stop.

Transit Systems Victoria operates two routes via Rockbank station, under contract to Public Transport Victoria:

- 140A : to Mount Atkinson
- 444 : to Aintree
- 464 : to Watergardens station
