= TLN =

TLN may refer to:

- Toulon-Hyères Airport, France, IATA code
- Telelatino, Spanish and Italian cable channel in Canada
- Total Living Network, a US religious television network
- Thermolysin, an enzyme
- Cobblebank railway station, railway station code
- Thallium nitride, a chemical compound, its formula is TlN
