= Watergardens =

Watergardens may refer to:

- Watergardens Town Centre, a major shopping centre, Sydenham, Victoria, Australia
  - Watergardens railway station, a railway station adjacent to Watergardens, in Melbourne
- Fort Worth Water Gardens, Texas

== See also ==
- Water garden or aquatic garden
