= Western Rail Plan =

Metropolitan rail project in Melbourne, Australia

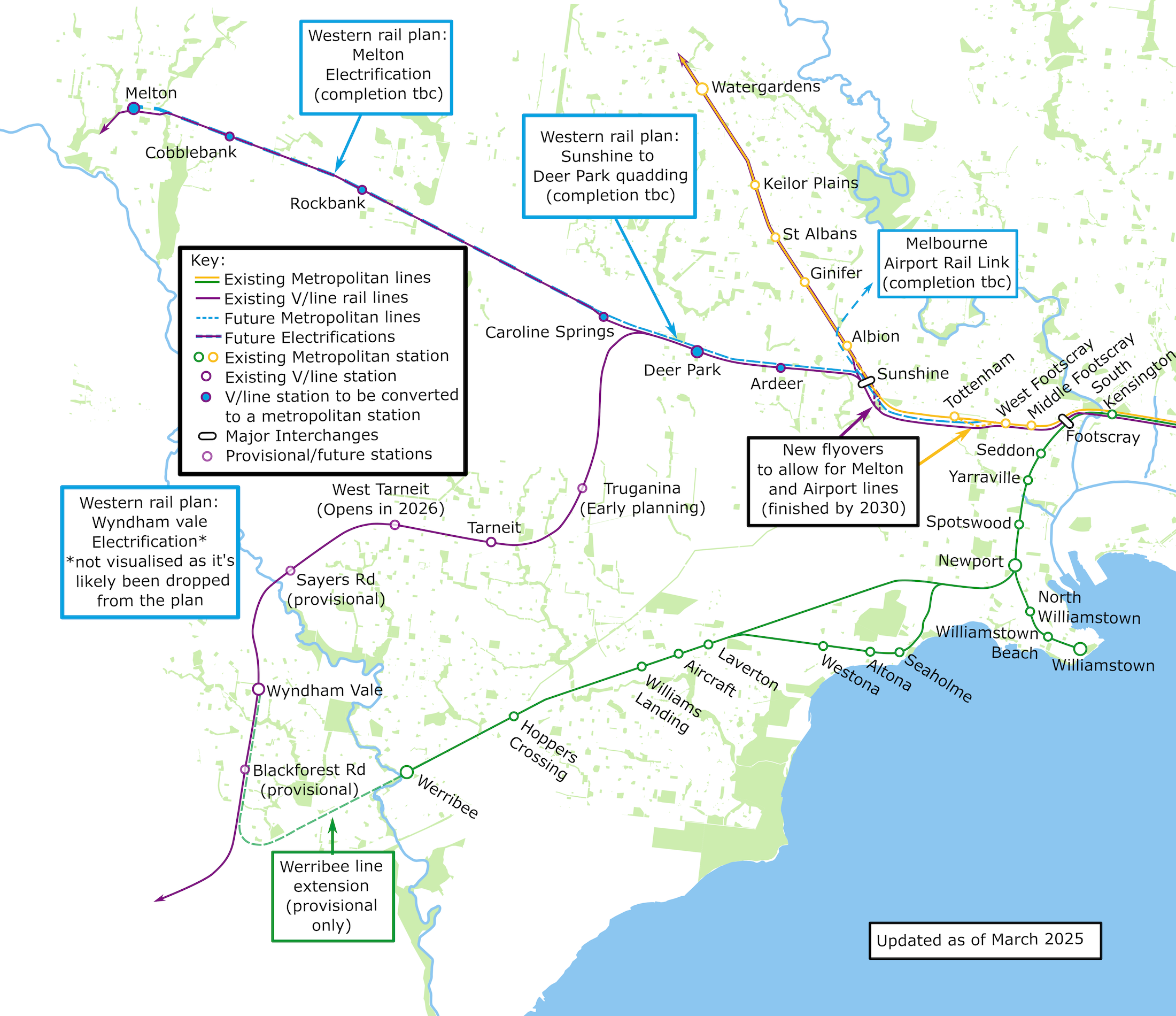
- A schematic diagram of the Western Rail Plan. The blue dotted lines represent the planned electrifications

Overview
- Status: High speed rail cancelled
- Website: Official website

The Western Rail Plan is a proposed metropolitan rail infrastructure project in Melbourne, Australia. The project was initially announced during the 2018 Victorian state election by the State Government. It includes the electrification of two currently existing regional lines to Melton and Wyndham Vale, and other network capacity upgrades.

The electrification to Melton is part of Stage 3 of the PTV Network Development Plan. Staging of the works component of the plan are being developed alongside the business case for the Melbourne Airport Rail Link.

In 2023, in the wake of the abandonment of the Geelong Fast Rail proposal, the Victorian Government denied reports that the Western Rail project had been cancelled, saying instead that it was a "work in progress". The plan now is for suburban trains to run on the same tracks as the Regional Rail Link, instead of segregating them.

== History ==
The Western Rail Plan was announced by the Andrews Labor government just over a month before the 2018 state election, and was one of a number of rail projects promised during the election campaign. One aspect of the plan, high-speed rail to Geelong, had been proposed by the Victorian Liberal Party on 3 October 2018, about two weeks before the Andrews Government revealed its Western Rail Plan.

Plans for electrification were originally revealed by Public Transport Victoria in the 2012 Network Development Plan, which suggested that the line to Melton should be electrified within the next 15 years. Wyndham Vale electrification was Stage 4, which meant the project would be undertaken within 20 years. However, in the revised plan, it was added to stage 3.

Six local governments along the main western rail line, the Brimbank, Melton, Moorabool, Ballarat, Ararat and Pyrenees councils, initiated a campaign for the electrification to Melton in May 2018, around six months before the 2018 state election. Along with electrification, they called for 12 peak-hour electric trains from Melton, and off-peak services every 20 minutes by 2026, as well as 10-car trains and trains every 10 minutes in non-peak times by 2030. A publication by the City of Brimbank warned that if those measures were not taken, there would be chronic overcrowding.

Planning for electrification to Melton and Wyndham Vale started in mid-2021 and was scheduled to be completed by mid-2023.

Development work for the Melton line electrification has received $152.7 million in funding in may 2026. Development work is set to begin in 2026 and to be completed in mid-2027. This covers environmental assessments, finalising designs, reviewing costs, and planning approval.

Route of the lines originally scheduled to be electrified, including stations and proposed stations

== Project description ==
=== Melton electrification ===
Part of the line between Melton and Deer Park was duplicated during the Regional Rail Revival Project, and provision was made for future electrification and an increase in services. Electrification to Melton would potentially triple the carrying capacity of the line, and allow up to 1500 people to travel on a single train.

As part of the electrification, the Melton line would be quadruplicated, to allow the separation of regional and metropolitan services. Two level crossings located in Deer Park would be removed to facilitate running trains at a higher frequency. There were plans for a station at Mount Atkinson, as well as a station serving the Paynes Road precinct.

=== Wyndham Vale electrification ===
The line to Wyndham Vale, which is part of the line to Geelong, was originally built under the Regional Rail Link project, and included including two new stations, Wyndham Vale and Tarneit, which were opened on 21 June 2015. Since the opening of those stations there has been patronage growth of 131%. During construction of the Regional Rail Link, provision was made for other stations at Truganina, Tarneit West (Sayers Road), Davis Road and Black Forest Road. As with the Melton electrification scheme, quadruplication of the line was proposed, to separate regional and metropolitan services. A rail link between Wyndham Vale and Werribee was also part of the project, with the potential for that link to become part of the Suburban Rail Loop. Prior to the 2022 Victorian state election, the Andrews Labor Government announced that Tarneit West would be built and that planning works for Truganina would begin.

=== Geelong Fast Rail ===
The Geelong Fast Rail project was a proposal for high-speed rail to Geelong, via the direct Werribee-Geelong route, which had been by-passed by the Regional Rail Link, as part of which, the line to Geelong via Wyndham Vale and Tarneit was constructed.

The proposal envisaged more frequent and reliable regional services, with dedicated rolling stock capable of speeds of around 250–300 km/h (155–186 mph), far greater than anything operating in Victoria, along with a new transport superhub at Sunshine to facilitate better integration of regional and suburban rail services. It was claimed that the high-speed service would entail a 32-minute journey between Geelong and Melbourne, although how that precise target had been arrived at was never explained.

Daniel Bowen, spokesman for the Public Transport Users Association, said the high-speed train project would boost regional development and relieve overcrowding and delays on city-bound trains from the west. The Andrews government gave $50 million to develop a business case, and the Morrison federal Coalition government promised to provide $2 billion for the project, provided the state government matched that investment.

In November 2020, the state government agreed to match the funding, and both governments announced Stage 1 of Geelong Fast Rail. The works would include:

- track upgrades between Werribee and Laverton, including a new dedicated express track for Geelong services
- upgrades to bridges over main roads
- station upgrades at Werribee and Laverton
- running some Geelong services via the Werribee rail corridor, which was expected to allow for more trains on the Sunshine rail corridor.

Construction of the first stage Geelong Fast Rail was expected to begin in 2023, and was to be built in conjunction with a Geelong line upgrade, as part of the Regional Rail Revival program. In November 2023, the Albanese government announced that federal funding for the Geelong Fast Rail project would be cut, which led to the project being cancelled.

== Analysis and criticism ==
The primary aim of the Western Rail Plan is to deal with the significant passenger demand on the growing western corridor, which had been expanding exponentially over the previous decade. That particularly followed the completion of the Regional Rail Link, which provided a route into the central Melbourne for passengers from the growing outer western suburbs, such as Tarneit and Wyndham Vale, who had previously had little or no public transport. The project aims to solve that problem by electrifying the lines to Melton and Wyndham Vale to take pressure off crowded regional trains, along with a high-speed rail service to Geelong cutting down travel times between Geelong and the Melbourne CBD. The project was welcomed by local councils along the affected lines, as well as public transport advocates, such as the Rail Futures Institute and the Public Transport Users Association.

However, the project was criticised for its lengthy timelines, with some saying the projected 2032 completion date was too far into the future. Geelong and Wyndham councils were concerned that they would be under-served if new suburban services had share tracks with trains on the proposed Melbourne Airport rail link. There was also concern that rapidly expanding housing developments in Bacchus Marsh were not be included in the electrification proposals. The president of the Rail Futures Institute, John Hearsch, said electrification beyond Melton would be necessary to properly serve the growing populations of Ballarat and Bacchus Marsh.

== See also ==
- Melbourne Airport Rail Link - Being done alongside Western Rail Plan
- Council makes request for second Tarneit Railway Station
- Rooney, Kieran; Wright, Shane; Sambul, Najma; Carmody, Broede (16 November 2023). "Geelong Fast Rail, Frankston upgrade among 12 projects axed by federal government". The Age.
