= Transit Systems Victoria =

Bus operator in Victoria, Australia

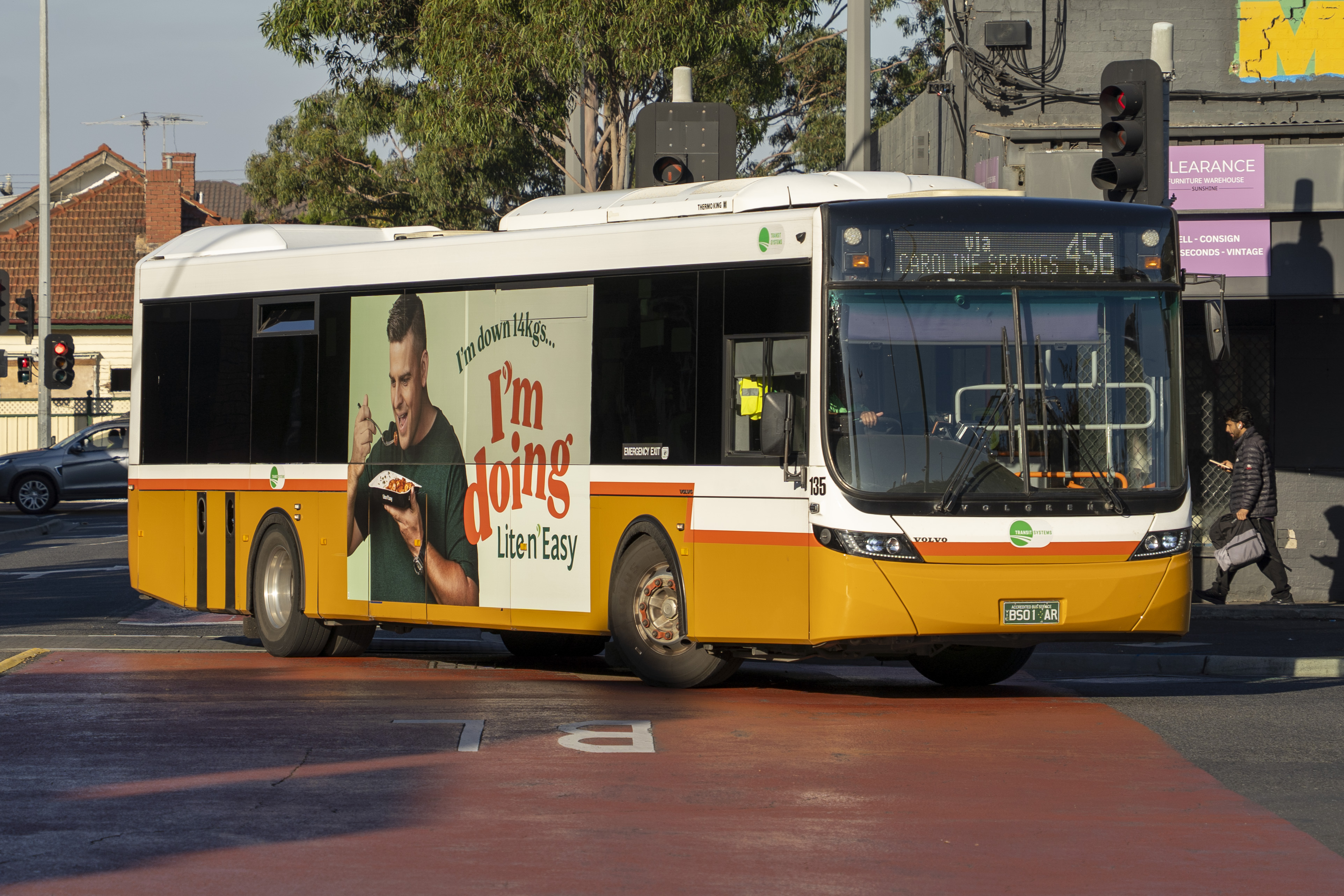
- Transit Systems Victoria Volgren bodied Volvo B7RLE at Sunshine in April 2026
- Parent: Transit Systems
- Founded: January 1972
- Headquarters: West Footscray
- Service area: Western Melbourne
- Service type: Bus & coach operator
- Routes: 19
- Hubs: Altona Gate Shopping Centre; Brimbank Central Shopping Centre; Footscray
- Stations: Ascot Vale railway station Footscray railway station Melton railway station Newport railway station, Melbourne; Sunshine railway station Williamstown railway station Yarraville railway station Cobblebank railway station Rockbank railway station Kensington railway station,
- Depots: West Footscray; Melton
- Fleet: 166 (December 2022)
- Website: Transit Systems Victoria

Transit Systems Victoria, formerly Sita Buslines, is a bus and coach operator in Melbourne, Australia. It is a subsidiary of Transit Systems and operates 19 bus routes under contract to Public Transport Victoria.

== History ==
In 1966, Frank Bono and George Sita purchased route 406 Footscray - East Keilor. In 1968, Sita sold his share to Frank Bono. In January 1972, Sita purchased Grangers Bus Lines, which operated route 472 Moonee Ponds Junction - Williamstown Beach. Subsequently purchased were Murrays Coaches in 1975, Nidis in 1979, West Newport Bus Service in November 1980, Sunshine Bus Lines in April 1982 and Starline Coaches in 1985.

Sita commenced coach operations in 1982, initially with second hand Dennings, before building up a large Austral Tourmaster fleet after 1984. In 1995, Sita purchased the Coachtrans coach operation on the Gold Coast and commenced operations in Sydney. The latter operation has since ceased.

On 1 July 2018, Sita commenced a new ten-year performance-based contract to operate its bus services. In April 2019, Sita was purchased by Transit Systems, and was re-branded Transit Systems Victoria in November 2020.

== Fleet ==
As at December 2022, the Transit Systems fleet consisted of 166 buses and coaches. Sita's bus livery was white at the top and fawn at the bottom with an orange stripe. A special orange, white and black livery was used on buses dedicated to the 401 shuttle from North Melbourne station to Melbourne University via the Royal Melbourne Hospital. Coaches wore a red, yellow and white livery, but are now painted white.
