= Mount Atkinson, Victoria =

Mount Atkinson
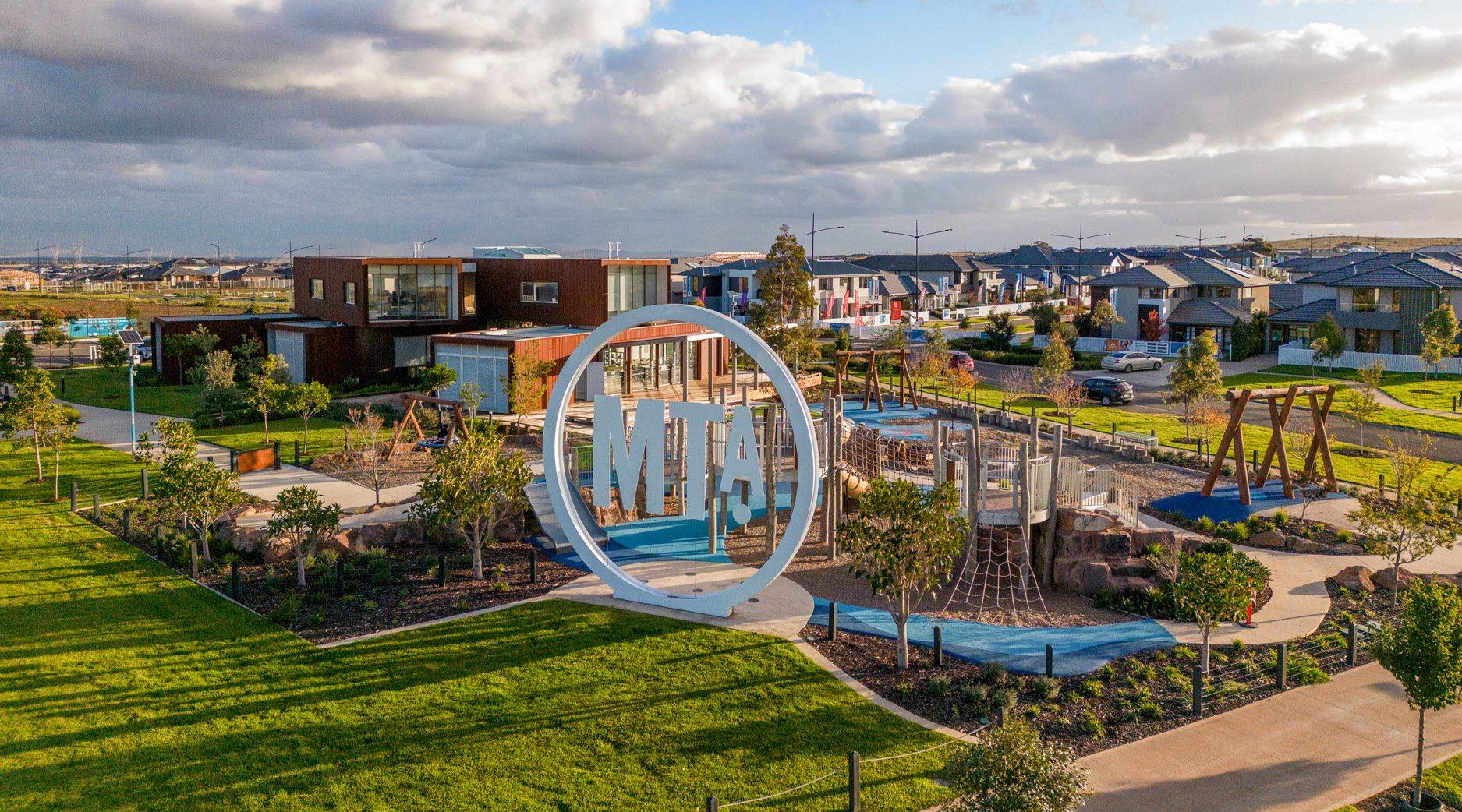
- Mt A. welcome sign with pocket park and the Vision Centre in the background

- Coordinates: 37.753°S 144.703°E
- Country: Australia
- State: Victoria
- City: Melbourne
- LGA: City of Melton
- Location: 23 km (14 mi) from Melbourne GPO
- Established: 2017

Government
  - State electorate: Kororoit
  - Federal division: Gorton

Population
  - Total: 9,881 (2024)
- Postcode: 3029

Mount Atkinson is a residential development in Melbourne, Victoria, Australia, 23 km (14 mi) west of the Melbourne central business district, located within the City of Melton local government area. Officially, it forms part of the suburb of Truganina.

== History ==
Mount Atkinson is situated in the Kulin nation traditional Aboriginal country. The Wathaurong and Woiwurrung people are local custodians within the Kulin nation.

The area is named for Mount Atkinson, a low hill that was a source of local lava flows. It is dwarfed by the more prominent Mount Cottrell a few kilometres to the west.

Residential development of the area was approved by the Victorian Government in 2017.

== Development ==
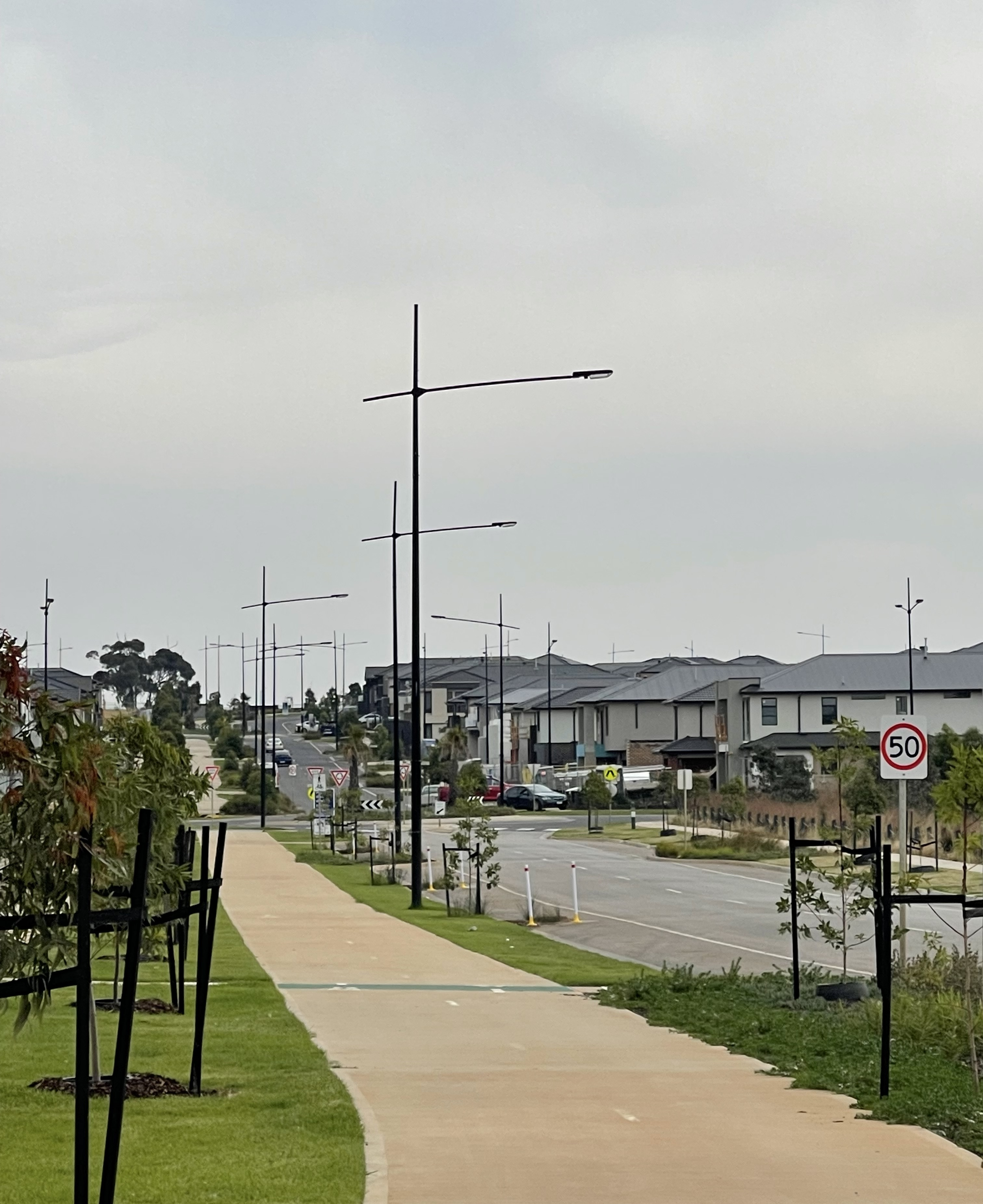
Clara Avenue looking north (a major road providing north-south thoroughfare) with Double Storey row of houses

Development in Mount Atkinson includes residential, educational facilities, a town centre, retail, parks and recreation, integrated industrial park, business precinct and a railway station. City of Melton has retained the postcode for Mount Atkinson.

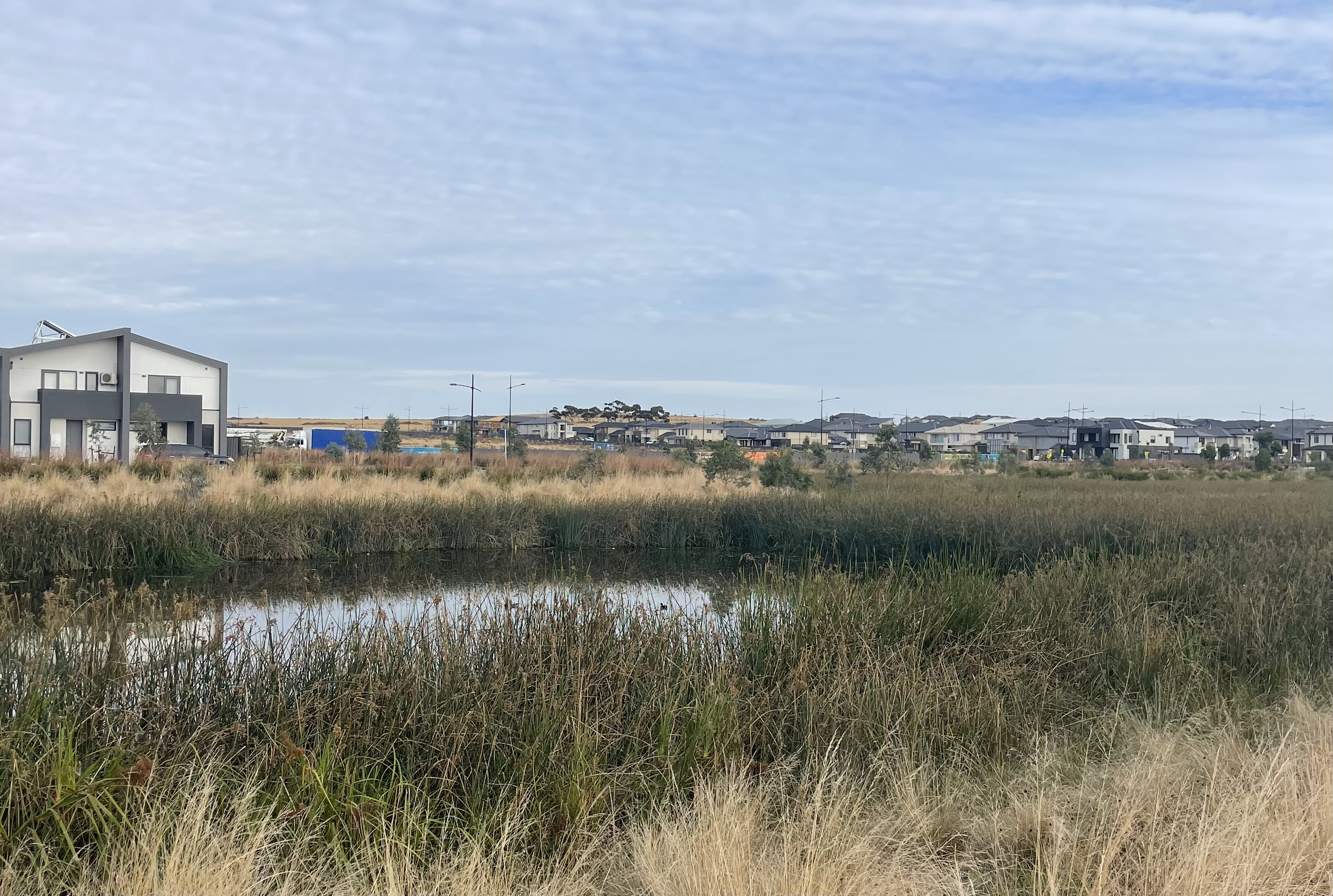
Skeleton Creek Wetlands with Mt Atkinson in the backdrop.

Mt. Atkinson, Olivia and Grandview are the three housing estates in Mount Atkinson, and the largest of them is Mt. Atkinson by Stockland. Mt. Atkinson estate includes proposed facilities for the suburb, such as: Mount Atkinson train station, Mount Atkinson Town Centre, Edmund Rice Education's primary and secondary schools, a state primary school, a homemaker centre, a large business centre and commercial precinct, as well as the revitalised Skeleton Creek wetlands.

$3 million in funding had been allocated for the Stage 1 construction of a Catholic Primary School located on Clara Avenue, with the school owned and operated under the umbrella of Edmund Rice Education Australia. The new school is expected to open in 2023.

== Parks and recreation ==
Proposed local parks and recreation reserves include the Mount Atkinson Nature Reserve with sporting and recreation facilities. Currently there are seven active parks in the suburb and with one currently under construction.

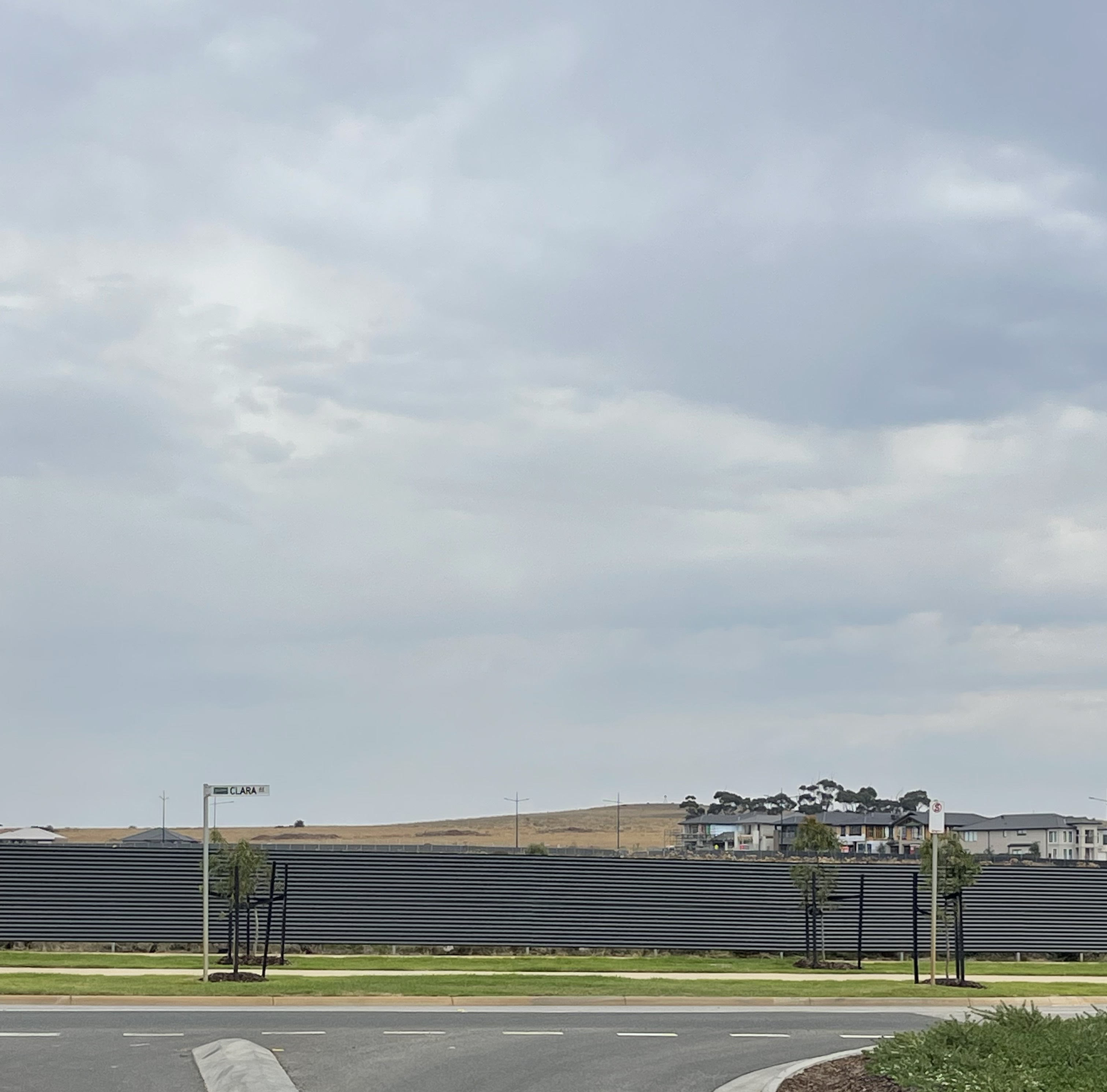
Mt Atkinson seen from a residential street, peaking at 140 meters above sea level.

The suburb comprises a hill of the same name (which forms part of the Great Dividing Range in Australia), elevated at a peak of 140 meters above sea level and situated within the Mount Atkinson Nature Reserve. The reserve incorporates a dormant shield volcano of the same name. The volcanic cone and its geological properties are recognized as a nature sensitive site.

== Education ==
Three primary schools and secondary school are proposed for the area. The Melbourne Archdiocese Catholic Schools (MACS) bought the private primary school site in 2023; with the school, St Marianne Cope Catholic Primary School opening in Term 1 2026.

The Victorian School Building Authority purchased the public primary school site in Mt Atkinson, with Mindalk Primary School also opening in Term 1 2026.

The Mt Atkinson Community and Children Centre opened its door for new enrolments in Term 1, 2023. The Mt Atkinson Children's and Community Centre offers free-kindergarten programs for three- and four-year-old children, adding over 300 early learning places to the local community.

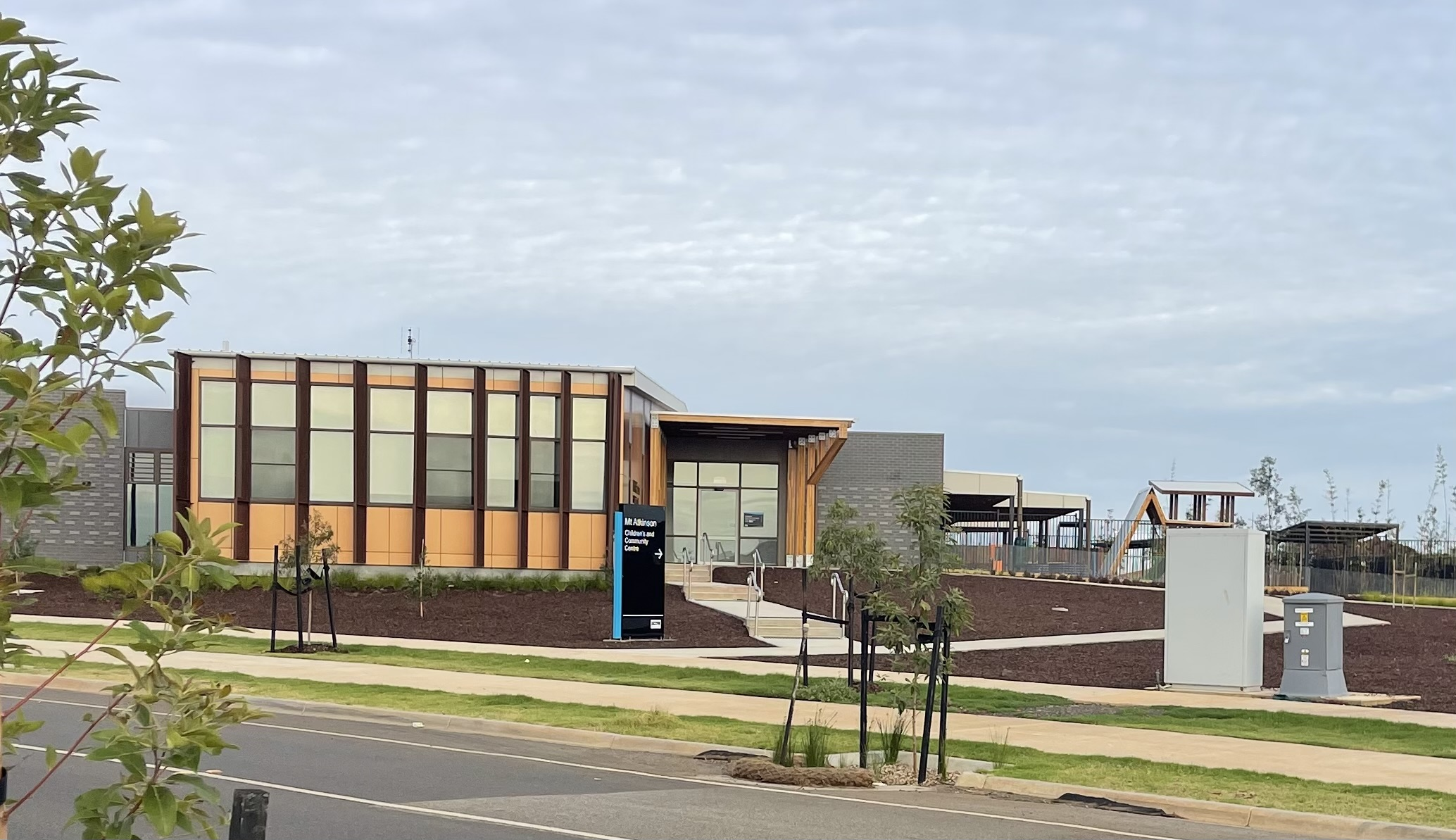
Mt Atkinson Children's & Community Centre, opened in Jan-2023

== Transport ==
The Ballarat railway line passes through the northern edge of the suburb, which has a proposal to include a brand new Mount Atkinson station. Mount Atkinson station is proposed to be built near Greigs Road as an integrated transport hub next to Westfield Mt. Atkinson Town Centre.

Infrastructure Victoria released an Infrastructure Strategy report in August 2021, mentioning a new electrified metro service to Rockbank or alternatively to the Mount Atkinson Activity Centre. The report found that terminating a new electrified metro service at Mount Atkinson would encourage more gradual westward housing growth, compared with complete electrification to Melton.

Services on a newly electrified line would operate a cross city service to Pakenham East using the Melbourne Metro Tunnel, currently planned to service Pakenham to Sunbury. This extension of the electrified rail service would primarily meet demand from population growth around Mount Atkinson Activity Centre and the further western and south-eastern growth areas.

In June 2026, a bus service, Route 140A, was introduced to the area, connecting Mount Atkinson, Grandview and Olivia estates to Rockbank station. The route is expected to connect the area to Tarneit station in late-2026.
