= Cobblebank railway station =

Railway station in Melbourne, Australia

Cobblebank
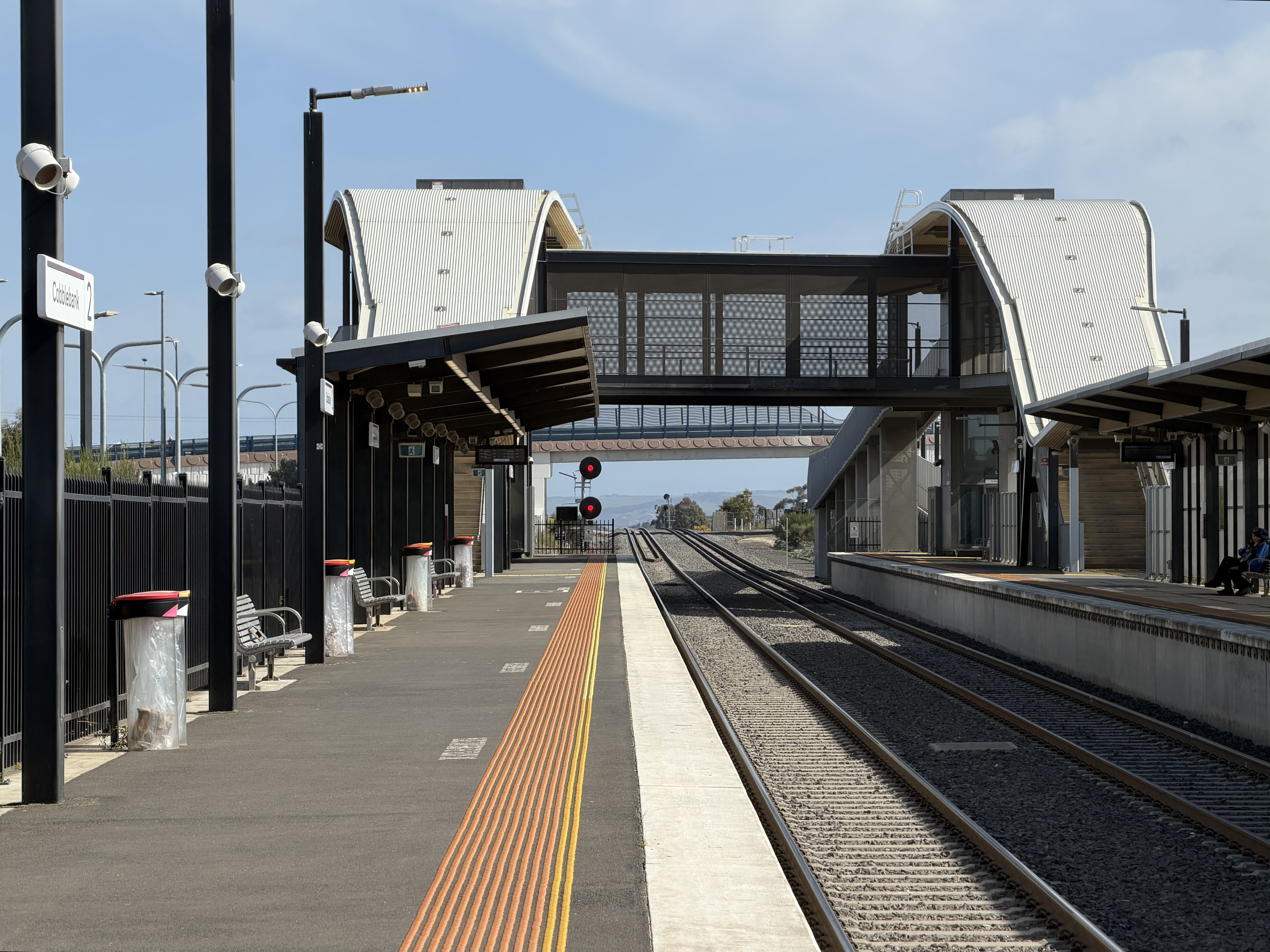
- Westbound view from Platform 2, September 2026

General information
- Location: Ferris Road, Cobblebank, Victoria 3338; City of Melton; Australia
- Coordinates: 37°42′42″S 144°36′07″E
- System: PTV regional rail station
- Owner: VicTrack
- Operator: V/Line
- Lines: Ballarat Ararat Maryborough (Ararat)
- Distance: 34.39 kilometres from Southern Cross
- Platforms: 2 side
- Tracks: 2
- Connections: Bus

Construction
- Structure type: At grade
- Parking: Yes
- Cycle facilities: Yes
- Accessible: Yes

Other information
- Status: Operational, unstaffed
- Station code: TLN
- Fare zone: Myki Zone 2
- Website: Public Transport Victoria

History
- Opened: 1 December 2019; 6 years ago
- Former names: Toolern (provisionally)

Passengers
- 2019–2020: 25,450
- 2020–2021: 46,950 ▲84.47%

Services
Preceding station	V/Line	Following station
Rockbank towards Southern Cross	Melton line	Melton Terminus
Rockbank towards Southern Cross	Ballarat line	Melton towards Wendouree
Rockbank towards Southern Cross	Ararat line	Melton towards Ararat
Rockbank towards Southern Cross	Maryborough line One daily service	Melton One-way operation
Track layout
Location

Cobblebank railway station is a regional railway station operated by V/Line on the Ararat and Ballarat lines, part of the Victoria rail network. It serves the western suburb of Cobblebank, in Melbourne, Victoria, Australia. Cobblebank is a ground-level unstaffed station, featuring two side platforms. The station opened on 1 December 2019.

The station was provisionally named Toolern, but was given the name "Cobblebank" during construction.

== History ==
Rail Motor Stopping Place No. 65, which was opened on 1 October 1934, was at the approximate location of the present Cobblebank station. By 4 November 1968, it had been removed from the Victorian Railways working timetable and, on 8 July 1969, it was formally closed to traffic.

In November 2017, the Victorian State Government announced that the station would be constructed, with a scheduled completion date of late 2019. The station, built as part of the Regional Rail Revival project, was provided to serve future residential developments nearby.

On 26 October 2018, the designs for the station were released and, at the same time, it was renamed from Toolern to Cobblebank. Despite that, it still uses the station code for Toolern (TLN).

The station was opened on 1 December 2019, with around 1000 community members attending the celebration. The station opening coincided with the duplication of 18 km of track between Deer Park West and Melton.

Cobblebank was planned to be integrated into the electrified metropolitan railway network, as part of the Western Rail Plan. However, in 2023, the State and Federal governments conducted a review of all national infrastructure projects, with the aim of reducing government spending, and it was concluded that the Western Rail Plan, including electrification to Melton and Wyndham Vale, and Geelong fast rail, would be cancelled.

However, in April 2026, the Victorian Government announced a Melton line upgrade that included aspects of the Western Rail Plan, involving extension of the platform at Coblebank to accommodate 9-car VLocity trains, and a train stabling yard near the station that would be able to house electric trains when they began to run on the line. On 4 May 2026, the Victorian Government announced that, in a dollar-for-dollar funding deal with the Australian Government, development works to support the future electrification of the Melton Line would be begun.

== Platforms, facilities and services ==
Cobblebank has two side platforms. The station has a ticketing office, an office, a waiting room, male, female and accessible toilets, and a pod for Protective Services Officers. There is a Parkiteer bicycle parking cage, an accessible pedestrian overpass with lifts, ramps and stairs, as well as bus and car parking.

The station was constructed with provision for two extra railway tracks, which would be used for express services after the planned electrification of the line.

Cobblebank is served by Ballarat, Ararat and Maryborough line trains.

Cobblebank platform arrangement
Platform	Line	Destination	Service Type
1	Ballarat line Ararat line Maryborough line	Southern Cross	Maryborough line: One daily V/Line service
2	Ballarat line Ararat line	Melton, Bacchus Marsh, Wendouree, Ararat	

== Transport links ==
Transit Systems Victoria operates two bus routes to Cobblebank station, under contract to Public Transport Victoria:

- 454 : to Melton station
- 451 : to Thornhill Park
- FlexiRide Melton South
