= Melton railway station, Melbourne =

Railway station in Melbourne, Australia

Melton
- Westbound view from Platform 3, September 2026

General information
- Location: Staughton Street, Melton South, Victoria, Australia
- Coordinates: 37°42′12″S 144°34′21″E
- System: PTV regional rail station
- Owner: VicTrack
- Operator: V/Line
- Lines: Ballarat Ararat Maryborough (Ararat)
- Distance: 37.32 kilometres from Southern Cross
- Platforms: 4 (2 side, 1 island)
- Tracks: 4
- Connections: Bus

Construction
- Structure type: Elevated
- Parking: 167
- Cycle facilities: Yes
- Accessible: Yes

Other information
- Status: Operational, staffed
- Station code: MEL
- Fare zone: Myki Zone 2
- Website: Public Transport Victoria

History
- Opened: 2 April 1884; 142 years ago
- Closed: 12 August 2026
- Rebuilt: 1 September 2026 (LXRP)

Passengers
- 2013–2014: 557,957
- 2014–2015: 588,252 ▲5.42%
- 2015–2016: 660,431 ▲12.27%
- 2016–2017: 726,339 ▲9.97%
- 2017–2018: Not measured
- 2018–2019: 827,850 ▲13.97%
- 2019–2020: 653,450 ▼21.07%
- 2020–2021: 326,100 ▼50.09%
- 2021–2022: 386,650 ▲18.57%
- 2022–2023: 560,150 ▲44.87%
- 2023–2024: 761,300 ▲35.91%

Services
Preceding station	V/Line	Following station
Cobblebank towards Southern Cross	Ballarat line	Bacchus Marsh towards Wendouree
Cobblebank towards Southern Cross	Melton line	Terminus
Cobblebank towards Southern Cross	Ararat line	Bacchus Marsh towards Ararat
Cobblebank towards Southern Cross	Maryborough line One daily service	Bacchus Marsh One-way operation
Track layout
Location
- Location within Melbourne

Melton is a regional railway station operated by V/Line on the Ararat and Ballarat lines, part of the Victoria rail network. It serves the outer-western suburb of Melton South, in Melbourne, Victoria, Australia. Melton is an elevated premium station with four platforms. Platform 1 and 4 are side platforms, and platforms 2 and 3 share an island platform with two faces. It opened on 2 April 1884, with the current station provided in September 2026 by the Level Crossing Removal Project.

Platforms 1 and 2 have been designed to be able to accommodate 9-carriage V/Line VLocity trains.

== History ==
=== 19th century ===
Melton Station opened when the railway line from Braybrook Junction (Sunshine) was extended to the suburb. Like the suburb itself, the station was named after Melton Mowbray in Leicestershire, England.

In 1886, the line was extended westward to Parwan and, being on a single track section, the station was the site of a crossing loop from that time. By 1889, the station had an interlocked signal box, single passenger platform, and a three-track yard. There was a goods shed opposite the passenger platform.

=== 20th century ===
In 1962, flashing light signals were provided at the Exford Road level crossing, located nearby in the up direction from the station. In 1987, the yard was rationalised, being reduced to a main line and crossing loop. Boom barriers were provided at the level crossing in 1990, and a second platform was added in 1991. In 1998, the station building was refurbished.

=== 21st century ===
In 2005, as part of the Regional Fast Rail project, control of the signals was transferred to the Ballarat signal box. The station retained the lever frame for historical purposes until the original station was demolished in 2025.

As part of the Regional Rail Revival project, 18 km of track was duplicated between the Deer Park West junction and Melton. The duplication was completed in late 2019, coinciding with the opening of the newly built Cobblebank Station.

On 6 September 2025, the station building on Platform 2 was demolished to make way for the new elevated station.

On 6 October 2022, the Andrews Government announced that four level crossings will be removed in Melton and Truganina by the Level Crossing Removal Project. As part of these removals, Melton Station was rebuilt as an elevated station. The rebuilt station included four platforms, allowing trains to terminate at Melton without blocking the main line towards Ballarat. Platform 1 and 4 are side platforms, and platforms 2 and 3 share an island platform with two faces.

Platforms 1 and 2 have been designed to accommodate 9-carriage V/Line VLocity DMUs, set to be introduced to the line in 2027, as well as the proposed electrification to Melton.

The rebuilt Melton station opened to the public on 1 September 2026.

=== Future ===
Electrification and quadruplication of the Ararat line up to Melton was announced by the Andrews Government in 2018 as part of its Western Rail Plan. After speculation in 2023 that this upgrade had been cancelled, in 2025, a track diagram was released showing changes that will be made as part of the major upgrades planned for Sunshine Station.

According to the diagram, quadruplication is planned to occur between a junction site near Caroline Springs and Sunshine; the new tracks will run into a new pair of platforms at Sunshine. The tracks at Sunshine will be reconfigured to route the future electrified Melton service through the Metro Tunnel.

In September 2026 during the lead up to the 2026 Victorian state election, the Victorian Liberal Party made an election promise to build and operate new Bi-Mode hybrid electric-battery trains on the Melton line as an interim solution to electrification.

== Platforms and services ==
Melton has four platforms, Platforms 1 & 4 are in a side platform layout while Platforms 2 & 3 share an island. The station is served by V/Line Ballarat and Ararat line trains.

Current

Melton platform arrangement
Platform	Line	Destination	Via	Service Type	Source
1	Melton line	Southern Cross	Sunshine	Weekday suburban services	
2	Melton line	Southern Cross	Sunshine	Weekday suburban services	
3	Ballarat line Ararat line Maryborough line	Southern Cross	Sunshine	Maryborough line: One daily V/Line service	
4	Ballarat line Ararat line	Bacchus Marsh, Wendouree, Ararat	Bacchus Marsh	Services to Bacchus Marsh only operate during weekday peaks.	

== Transport links ==
Transit Systems Victoria operates six bus routes and one route is operated by Christians Bus to and from Melton station, under contract to Public Transport Victoria:

- 452 : to Eynesbury
- 453 : to Melton
- 454 : to Cobblebank station
- 455 : to Micasa Rise/Roslyn Park (Harkness)
- 457 : to Melton
- 458 : to Kurunjang
- 459 : to Arnolds Creek (Melton West)
- FlexiRide Melton South
