= Regional Rail Revival project =

Railway infrastructure project in Victoria, Australia

Regional Rail Revival
- Location: Victoria, Australia
- Proposer: Government of Victoria
- Status: Under Construction
- Type: Railway upgrade
- Cost estimate: $1.8 billion
- Start date: October 2017
- Completion date: c. 2024–2025
- Stakeholders: Government of Australia (major funding partner); Government of Victoria (minor funding partner); V/Line (operator)

The Regional Rail Revival is a joint initiative between the Australian federal government and the Victorian state government to upgrade all regional railway lines in Victoria. The project has an estimated total cost of $4 billion, including $2.3 billion funded by the Commonwealth. It was delivered by Rail Projects Victoria (RPV) until April 2024, and then by the Level Crossing Removal Project. The project is guided by the 2016 Regional Network Development Plan, which outlines the short, medium and long-term priorities for a modernised regional rail network.

== History ==
The Regional Rail Revival (RRR) project in Victoria has been a significant endeavour in the realm of state infrastructure, unfolding over several years with contributions from both state and federal governments. This project began in earnest during the late 2010s, with its complexities rooted in policy decisions, funding allocations, and the practicalities of rail infrastructure development.

In the earlier years of this decade, the need for revitalising Victoria's regional rail network was becoming increasingly apparent. The lines connecting Melbourne to regional centres like Ballarat, Bendigo, Geelong, Gippsland, and Warrnambool were showing signs of wear, with services that were slower, less frequent, and sometimes unreliable compared to urban rail networks. This situation was a product of many years of underinvestment, a trend that had begun in the late 20th century as the focus shifted to road transport.

The federal Liberal/National government under Prime Minister Malcolm Turnbull in 2017 initiated a policy direction that would have profound effects on regional rail in Victoria. Through the Asset Recycling Initiative, the federal government aimed to incentivise states to sell public assets and reinvest the proceeds into infrastructure projects. This was part of a broader strategy where economic growth was seen as closely tied to infrastructure development. Victoria, under the Labor government led by Premier Daniel Andrews, was quick to engage with this initiative, seeing an opportunity to address the long-standing issues with its regional rail.

The announcement of a $1.7 billion investment for Victoria's regional rail network was a pivotal moment. This funding was to be spread across multiple lines, with detailed plans for each:

- Ballarat Line: Received $557 million for track duplication, new passing loops, and station upgrades to reduce travel times significantly.
- Bendigo Line: Allocated $91 million, focusing on improving both passenger and freight services, acknowledging Bendigo's growing economic significance.
- Geelong Line: Slated for $110 million to improve connectivity between Melbourne and Victoria's second-largest city.
- Gippsland Line: With $530 million, aiming to address what was often described as one of the state's most problematic rail services.
- Warrnambool Line: Given $114 million for upgrades to increase capacity and reliability, particularly important for the agriculturally rich south-west region.

This era was marked by a cooperative effort between the federal LNP (Liberal/National Party) government and the state Labor government, where political differences were set aside for the sake of infrastructure development. The deal was not only about funding but also about policy alignment, particularly with the Inland Rail project, which aimed to connect Melbourne to Brisbane. The strategic alignment of these projects under Turnbull's leadership provided a framework for how regional and national infrastructure initiatives could work together.

As the project moved into implementation, the Victorian government took the lead on the ground. This involved extensive consultations with local communities, businesses, and transport experts to tailor the upgrades to specific regional needs. The process was bureaucratic, involving environmental assessments, heritage considerations, and logistical planning for construction phases that would minimally disrupt existing services.

Following Turnbull, the Morrison government continued to support the initiative, with the LNP maintaining a policy focus on infrastructure. This continuity in policy from one LNP leader to another helped ensure that the funding and support for the RRR did not waver, despite changes in the federal leadership.

The early 2020s saw further developments. Even as political landscapes changed, with a federal Labor government taking over, the commitment to the RRR project remained, albeit with different emphases. The new government, whilst having its own priorities, recognised the foundational work done by their predecessors and its ongoing benefits. This period was about fine-tuning, ensuring project completion, and looking forward to the integration of these rail improvements with other transport modes and environmental goals.

== Projects ==
Regional Rail Revival is made up of multiple projects:

- Ararat Stabling (completed December 2020)
- Ballarat Line Upgrade (completed early 2021)
  - track duplication between Deer Park West and Melton (length of 18 kilometres (11 mi)), and at Bacchus Marsh
  - new Cobblebank station between Rockbank and Melton
  - reconstruction of Rockbank Station
  - upgrades to Bacchus Marsh, Ballan and Wendouree stations, including new platforms
  - new train stabling facility at Maddingley
  - passing loops at Ballan and Millbrook
  - signal and track upgrades
- Bendigo and Echuca Line Upgrade (completed August 2023)
  - modernised electronic train order (ETO) system from Bendigo to Swan Hill and Echuca
  - upgrades to ten level crossings between Eaglehawk and Bendigo with improved train detection technology
  - track upgrades on the Echuca Line, which will increase the maximum train speed on the line.
  - new stations at Huntly, Goornong, and Raywood. Goornong and Raywood stations were previously closed in 1979 and 1981 respectively.
- Donnybrook upgrade (completed August 2020)
  - 150 new car parking spaces
  - New platform shelters
  - Improved pedestrian access
  - Improved security with addition CCTV and new platform lighting
  - An extension of the city-bound platform
- Geelong Line Upgrade (completed August 2024)
  - track duplication between South Geelong and Waurn Ponds
  - upgrades to South Geelong, Marshall and Waurn Ponds stations
  - new train maintenance and stabling facility at Waurn Ponds
  - level crossing removals
  - Armstrong Creek corridor extension (planning)
- Gippsland Line Upgrade (completed August 2025)
  - new rail bridge over the Avon River in Stratford (completed)
  - upgrades to Bunyip, Longwarry, Morwell and Traralgon stations, including new platforms
  - track duplication at Bunyip and Longwarry
  - extension of the Morwell crossing loop
  - level crossing and signalling upgrades
  - drainage structure upgrades
- Murray Basin Rail Project
  - upgrades to the Victorian freight network including sleeper replacement and track upgrade
- North-East Line Upgrade (completed December 2020)
  - introduction of VLocity trains on the line for the first time
- Shepparton Line Upgrade
- Wallan station upgrade (completed August 2020)
  - An extension of the existing waiting room
  - New toilets in the waiting room
  - New platform shelters
  - Two new bus bays with shelters
  - Improved security with addition CCTV and new platform lighting
  - Additional bicycle parking
  - An extension of the city-bound platform
- Warrnambool Line Upgrade (Stage 1) (completed December 2022)
  - upgrades to 12 level crossings with improved train detection technology (completed)
  - signalling upgrades
  - new crossing loop at Boorcan
- Warrnambool Line Upgrade (Stage 2)
  - upgrades to more than 50 level crossings with improved train detection technology
  - stabling upgrade at Warrnambool station
  - introduction of VLocity trains on the line for the first time

== Construction ==
=== Timeline ===
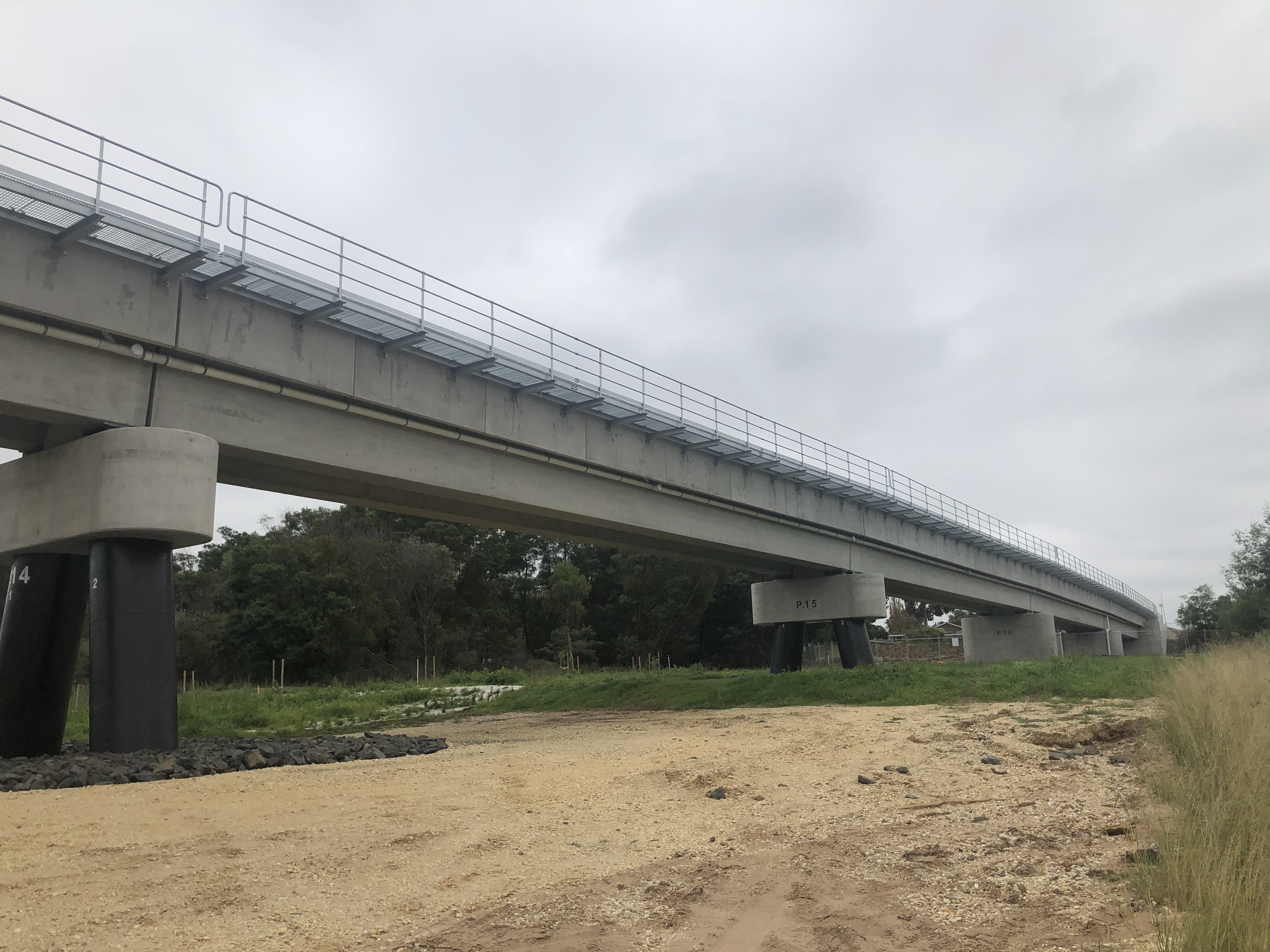
New Avon River rail bridge in April 2021

- 27 October 2017 – Construction as part of Ballarat Line upgrade commences.
- 3 November 2017 – New station at Toolern (now Cobblebank), on Melton Line, announced.
- 20 December 2017 – Wendouree Station upgrade announced.
- 14 March 2018 – Geotechnical investigations begin out on the Gippsland Line.
- 19 July 2018 – Ballan station upgrade plans revealed.
- 22 October 2018 -Construction commences on Shepparton stabling facility.
- 30 May 2019 – Construction begins as part of Donnybrook and Wallan upgrades.
- Early July 2019 – Total work time as a part of the Ballarat Line upgrade hits 1,000,000 hours.
- 26 August 2019 – Construction at Rockbank finishes, and the station opens.
- 20 November 2019 – Construction of the new Avon River railbridge in Stratford commences.
- 1 December 2019– New station at Toolern, named Cobblebank, opens to public.
- 6 December 2019 – Construction begins on stabling facility at Ararat.
- 28 January 2020 – Construction begins on the upgrade of four level crossings on the Warrnambool Line.
- 23 April 2020 – Donnybrook upgrade completed, with addition of 150 new car parking spaces, new platform shelters and the city-bound platform extended, improved pedestrian access, improved security with CCTV and lighting on platforms and in the car park.
- 24 April 2020 – Works completed on four new level crossing boom gates along the Warrnambool Line.
- 31 July 2020 – Announcement of three new Bendigo railway line stations: Huntly, Goornong, and Raywood.
- 12 December 2021 – Construction at Goornong finishes, and the station opens.
- 31 May 2022 - Waurn Ponds upgrade completed, with addition of a second platform, an upgraded car park and a new pedestrian overpass.
- 16 July 2022 – Construction at Huntly finishes, and the station opens.
- 17 July 2022 – Construction at Raywood finishes, and the station.
- 22 July 2022 - Construction of the Gippsland Line upgrade commences.
- 13 May 2023 - Construction of the new Waurn Ponds stabling facility finishes, allowing an additional 31 Geelong Line services weekly.
- 26 August 2024 - Duplication of the Geelong line between Waurn Ponds and South Geelong completed, with second platforms at Marshall and South Geelong stations. The level crossings at Fyans Street and Surf Coast Highway were also replaced with rail bridges.

== See also ==
- Regional Fast Rail project – a prior project aimed at improving regional rail services across Victoria
- Regional Rail Link project – a prior project to separate regional V/Line services from the electrified Melbourne suburban services
