= Wendouree railway station =

Railway station in Victoria, Australia

Wendouree
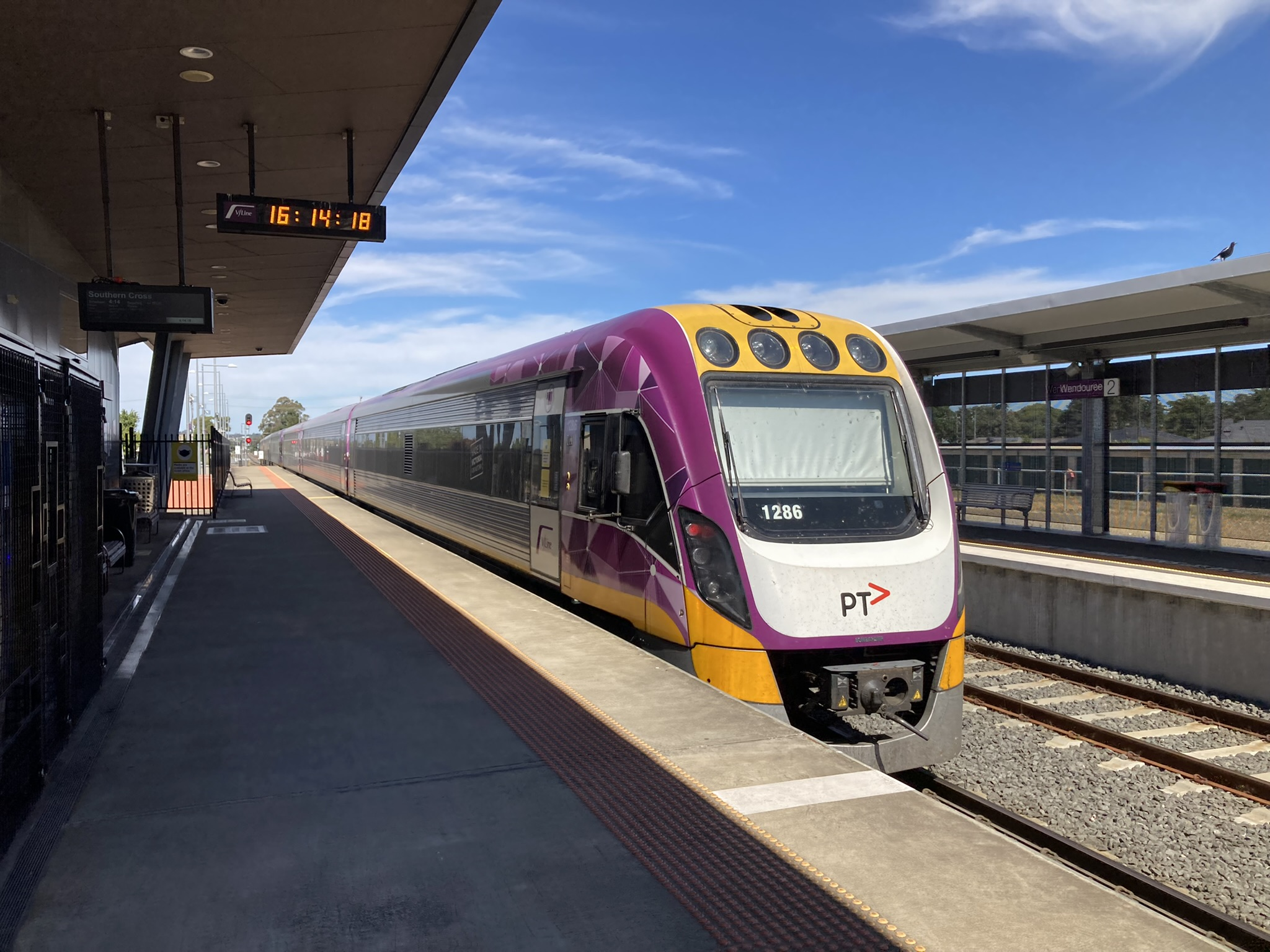
- Eastbound view from Platform 1, with a Southern Cross-bound VLocity train departing, December 2021

General information
- Location: Gillies Street North, Wendouree, Victoria 3355; City of Ballarat; Australia
- Coordinates: 37°32′30″S 143°49′48″E
- System: PTV regional rail station
- Owner: VicTrack
- Operator: V/Line
- Lines: Ballarat Ararat (Ararat)
- Distance: 123.13 kilometres from Southern Cross
- Platforms: 2 side
- Tracks: 2
- Connections: Bus

Construction
- Structure type: Ground
- Parking: 200 bays
- Cycle facilities: Yes
- Accessible: Yes

Other information
- Status: Operational, staffed
- Station code: WED
- Fare zone: Myki zone 8
- Website: Public Transport Victoria

History
- Opened: 12 June 2009; 17 years ago
- Rebuilt: January 2021 (Regional Rail Revival Project)

Passengers
- 2013–2014: 85,508
- 2014–2015: 101,117 ▲18.25%
- 2015–2016: 116,143 ▲14.86%
- 2016–2017: 131,407 ▲13.14%
- 2017–2018: Not measured
- 2018–2019: 158,150 ▲20.35%
- 2019–2020: 108,050 ▼31.67%
- 2020–2021: 43,550 ▼59.69%

Services
Preceding station	V/Line	Following station
Ballarat towards Southern Cross	Ballarat line	Terminus
Ballarat towards Southern Cross	Ararat line	Beaufort towards Ararat
Location
- Location within Victoria

Wendouree railway station is a regional railway station operated by V/Line on the Ararat line and is the terminus for the Ballarat line, part of the Victoria rail network. It serves the north-western Ballarat suburb of Wendouree, in Victoria, Australia. Wendouree is a ground-level staffed station, featuring two side platforms. The station opened on 12 June 2009, with the current platform 2 provided in 2021.

== History ==
=== 20th century ===
The original Wendouree station opened on 9 December 1901 as Ballarat Gardens, and was renamed Wendouree on 1 August 1905. It was located just west of the Forest Street level crossing, 750 metres east of the present station, and was closed to passenger traffic on 4 October 1981, as part of the New Deal for Country Passengers timetable. Prior to its closure, the only train timetabled to stop at Wendouree was a Horsham service on Sundays.

In 1992, boom barriers replaced interlocked gates at the Gillies Street level crossing, in the up direction from the present station.

At Gillies Street, near the site of the current station, there was a 19th-century signal box, which controlled the Ballarat Cattle Yards junction. After falling into disrepair, the Public Transport Corporation was approached by Kim Lynden, who successfully tendered to move the building to Blampied in 1998, where it is used as a bed and breakfast facility.

=== 21st century ===
On 8 September 2006, then Victorian Premier, Steve Bracks, announced a new station would be built to relieve congestion at Ballarat, following a passenger boom after the completion of the Regional Fast Rail project.

The station was the subject of a naming competition, which closed in April 2007. Construction work started in May 2008, with the station originally due for completion in that year.

On 11 June 2009, the station was opened by the then Minister for Public Transport, Lynne Kosky, with services commencing on 14 June. The cost of the station and associated works was initially projected to be $11 million, but eventually cost $18.7 million.

In 2021, as part of the Regional Rail Revival project, Platform 2 and its refuge siding was opened opposite Platform 1, allowing terminating Ballarat trains to not block Ararat trains that use Platform 1, with a footbridge, lifts, ramps and stairs connecting the platforms. There was also an upgrade to the station forecourt.

== Platforms and services ==
Wendouree has two side platforms, and is served by Ballarat and Ararat line trains.

Wendouree platform arrangement
Platform	Line	Destination
1	Ballarat line Ararat line	Southern Cross, Ararat
2	Ballarat line	Southern Cross

== Transport links ==
CDC Ballarat operates four bus routes via Wendouree station, under contract to Public Transport Victoria:

- 10 : Ballarat station – Alfredton
- 11 : to Ballarat station
- 12 : to Ballarat station
- 31 : to Miners Rest

== Gallery ==
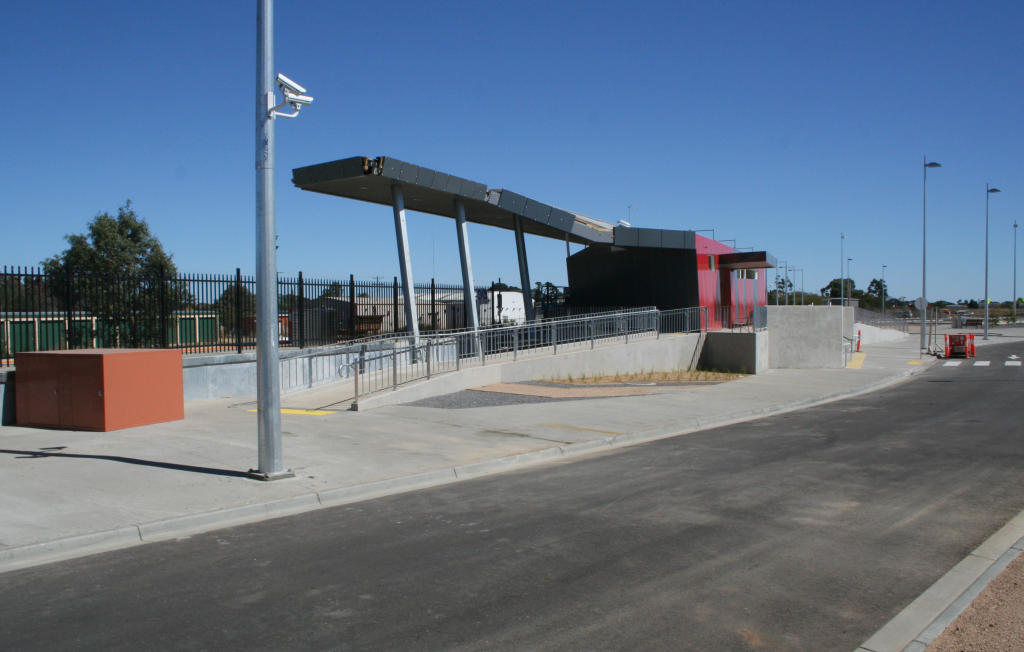
Station building and entrance, March 2009
