= Ararat railway station =

Railway station in Victoria, Australia

Ararat
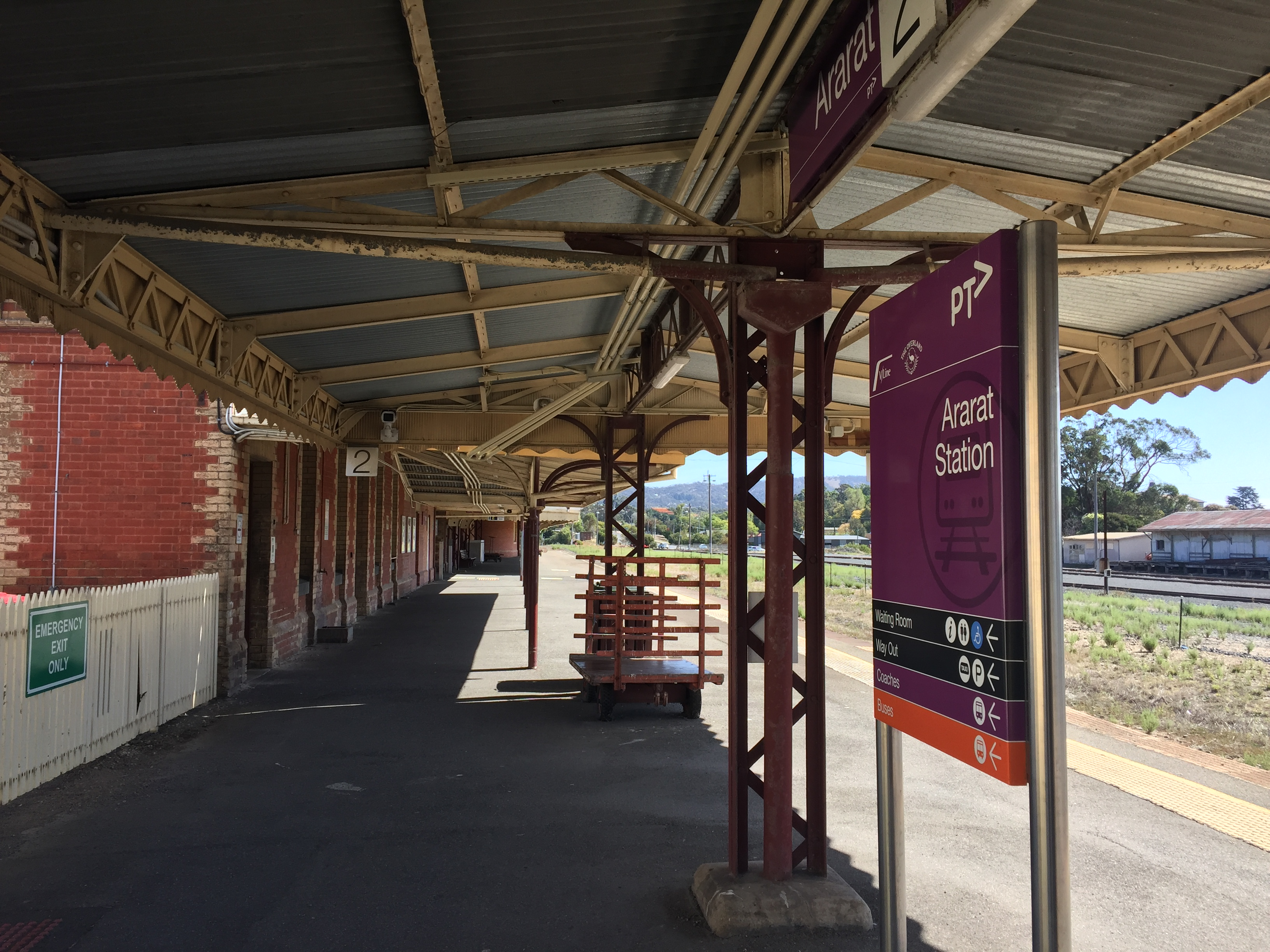
- Westbound view from Platform 2, April 2022

General information
- Location: Birdwood Avenue, Ararat, Victoria 3377; Rural City of Ararat; Australia
- Coordinates: 37°16′56″S 142°56′12″E
- System: PTV regional and Journey Beyond inter-city rail station
- Owner: VicTrack
- Operator: V/Line; Journey Beyond
- Lines: Ararat (Ararat); The Overland (Western SG)
- Distance: 210.82 kilometres from Southern Cross
- Platforms: 2 (1 side, 1 bay)
- Tracks: 4
- Connections: Bus; Coach

Construction
- Structure type: Ground
- Parking: Yes
- Cycle facilities: Yes

Other information
- Status: Operational, staffed
- Station code: ART
- Fare zone: Myki zone 16
- Website: Public Transport Victoria

History
- Opened: 7 April 1875; 151 years ago
- Closed: 27 May 1994
- Rebuilt: 11 July 2004

Passengers
- 2013–2014: 42,882
- 2014–2015: 42,447 ▼1.01%
- 2015–2016: 41,630 ▼1.92%
- 2016–2017: 40,522 ▼2.66%
- 2017–2018: Not measured
- 2018–2019: 42,750 ▲5.49%
- 2019–2020: 31,700 ▼25.84%
- 2020–2021: 15,500 ▼51.1%

Services
Preceding station	V/Line	Following station
Beaufort towards Southern Cross	Ararat line	Terminus
Preceding station	Journey Beyond	Following station
Stawell towards Adelaide	The Overland	North Shore towards Melbourne
Former service
Preceding station	Disused railways	Following station
Terminus	Ararat–Maryborough line	Ben Nevis
Location
- Location within Victoria

Ararat railway station is a railway station on the Western standard gauge line and is the terminus for V/Line services on the Ararat line. It serves the town of Ararat, in Victoria, Australia. Ararat is a ground-level staffed station, featuring two platforms: platform 1 a side platform and platform 2 a bay platform. The station opened on 7 April 1875, with the current station provided in 2004. The station originally closed on 27 May 1994, but the station later reopened on 11 July 2004.

The station is the terminus of the broad gauge line from Southern Cross in Melbourne; and the junction for the Western standard gauge line to Adelaide, the standard gauge line to Maryborough via Avoca, and the Portland line.

Ararat is served by a passenger service operated by V/Line to Melbourne, and Journey Beyond's The Overland passenger service to Adelaide.

== History ==
Ararat station opened when the railway line from Ballarat was extended to the town. In December 1877, a line south to Portland opened and, in January 1887, the mainline was extended west, reaching the South Australian border at Serviceton. In 1890, the line to Maryborough opened. Two signal boxes ("A" and "B") opened in 1891 and, in 1914, the goods sidings were extended, with the locomotive depot built soon after.

In the late 1930s, the locomotive depot was expanded, in conjunction with the anticipated arrival of the new H class 4-8-4 steam locomotives, intended for use on The Overland passenger train. An 85-foot (26 m) turntable was installed, with 24 roads around it, the largest on the Victorian Railways network. Before that, Stawell had been the major locomotive servicing facility in the region.

During 1985, the passenger facilities in the main station building were refurbished. However, during that time, rationalisation of the facilities began. Signal box "B" was demolished in 1984, with the train control office following in 1988. The footbridge, which was located at the up end of the station, was destroyed in a derailment in May 1986. The Mobil siding and associated points and staff lock were abolished in January 1988. The locomotive depot closed in 1989, the train crew depot closed on 30 June 1994, with signal box "A" following in 1996.

Gauge conversion was carried out at the station in the 1990s, with the main line to Adelaide being converted to standard gauge as part of the One Nation project. On 21 August 1993, V/Line passenger services to Dimboola were withdrawn, and services to Ararat were withdrawn on 27 May 1994 to allow for conversion of the Ararat−Serivceton section of the line to standard gauge. That section of the line was connected to other sections of track also converted as part of the One Nation project to form the Western standard gauge line, which opened in 1995.

On 11 July 2004, the broad gauge line to Ballarat and Melbourne was reopened, with V/Line passenger services being reinstated. The contract for the work had been awarded in February 2003. A diamond crossing and associated signalling had to be installed, to allow the broad gauge line to cross the standard gauge line and reach the platform. In January 2005, the Maryborough line was booked out of use.

The Murray Basin Rail Project, which began in 2016, included reopening of the line from Ararat to Maryborough. In early 2018, the line was officially re-opened at Avoca, after having sat idle for more than 13 years.

As part of the Regional Rail Revival project, an extra stabling siding was provided at the station, to accommodate an extra morning service. By early 2021, the project had been completed, with a new timetable being introduced on 31 January of that year. The stabling yard is able to hold two three-carriage VLocity trains.

On the 19th of October 2026, the Victorian Liberals and Nationals committed to introducing a V/Line passenger rail shuttle service connecting Dimboola, Horsham and Murtoa to Melbourne bound trains at Ararat, if the two parties won the 2026 Victorian state election.

== Platforms, facilities and services ==
Ararat has two platforms. The full-length standard gauge platform is on the north side, with broad gauge trains using a bay platform on the south side. There is a railway grade crossing approximately 500 metres east of the station, which allows the broad gauge line to cross the standard gauge line and continue east towards Beaufort and Ballarat, while the standard gauge line heads south towards Geelong.

Control of signals at the station is carried out by both the Australian Rail Track Corporation control centre at Mile End, South Australia, and Centrol, in Melbourne.

Two dead-end sidings, located to the east, are used for stabling broad gauge passenger trains and there are two standard gauge loops, and one dead-end siding, across from the main platform.

Ararat is served by V/Line Ararat line trains on the broad gauge line, and Journey Beyond The Overland services on the standard gauge line.

Ararat platform arrangement
Platform	Line	Destination
1	The Overland	Melbourne, Adelaide
2	Ballarat line	Southern Cross

== Transport links ==
Ararat Transit (Christians) operates six bus routes via Ararat station, under contract to Public Transport Victoria:

- 1 : to Ararat West via Brewster Road
- 2 : to Ararat South via Burke Street
- 3 : to Ararat North via Baird Street
- to Maryborough via Elmhurst and Avoca
- to Hopkins Correctional Centre
- Ararat – Lake Bolac via Willaura

V/Line operates road coach services from Ararat to Ballarat, Warrnambool and Nhill. The Ballarat and Nhill services are operated by Firefly Express.

== Gallery ==
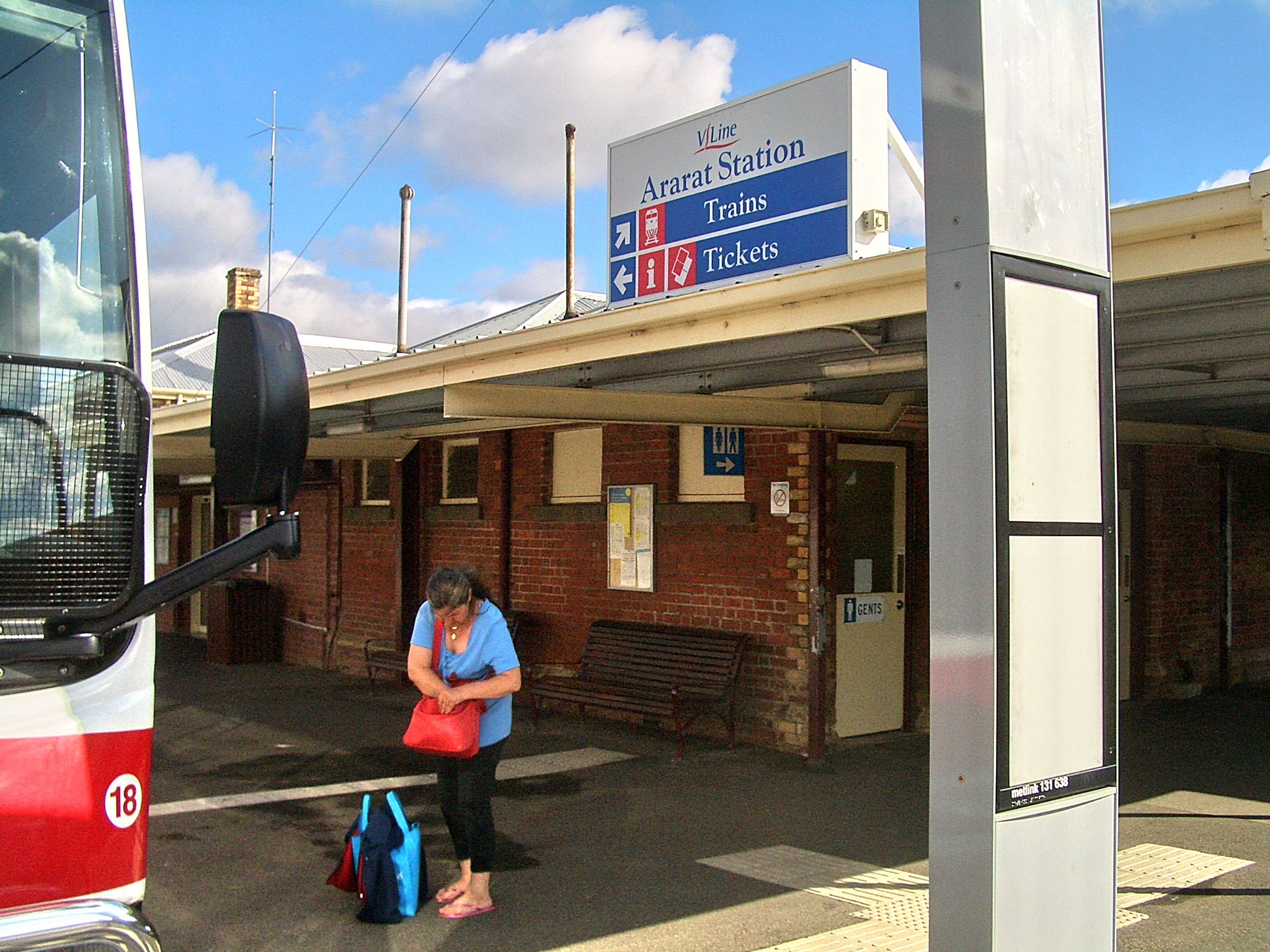
Station front, entrance and bus interchange, March 2008

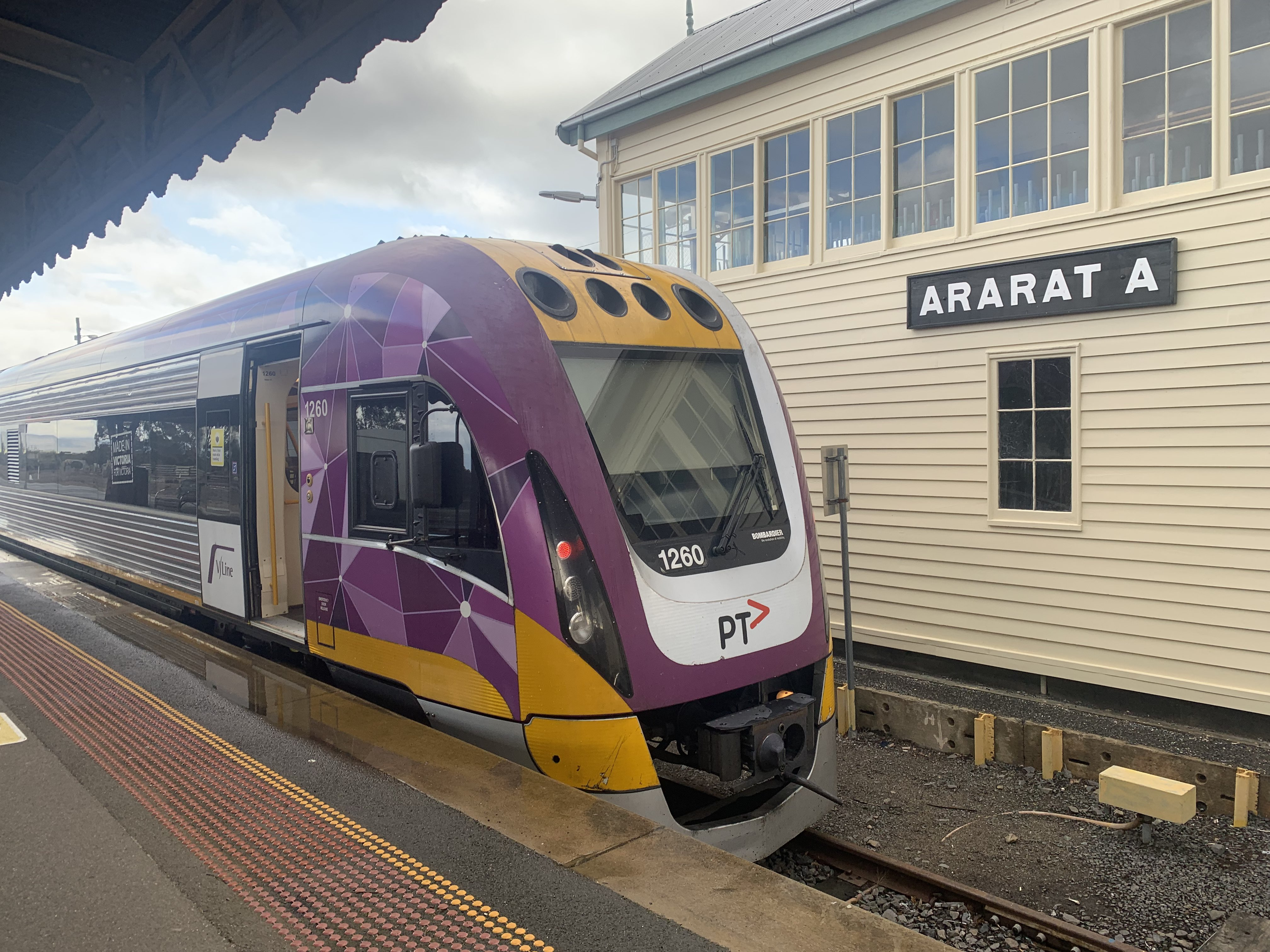
VLocity set VL60 sits at Platform 2 next to Signal Box A, September 2022

== See also ==
- Avoca railway station
- Avoca railway line
- Ben Nevis railway station
