= Stawell railway station =

Railway station in Victoria, Australia

Stawell
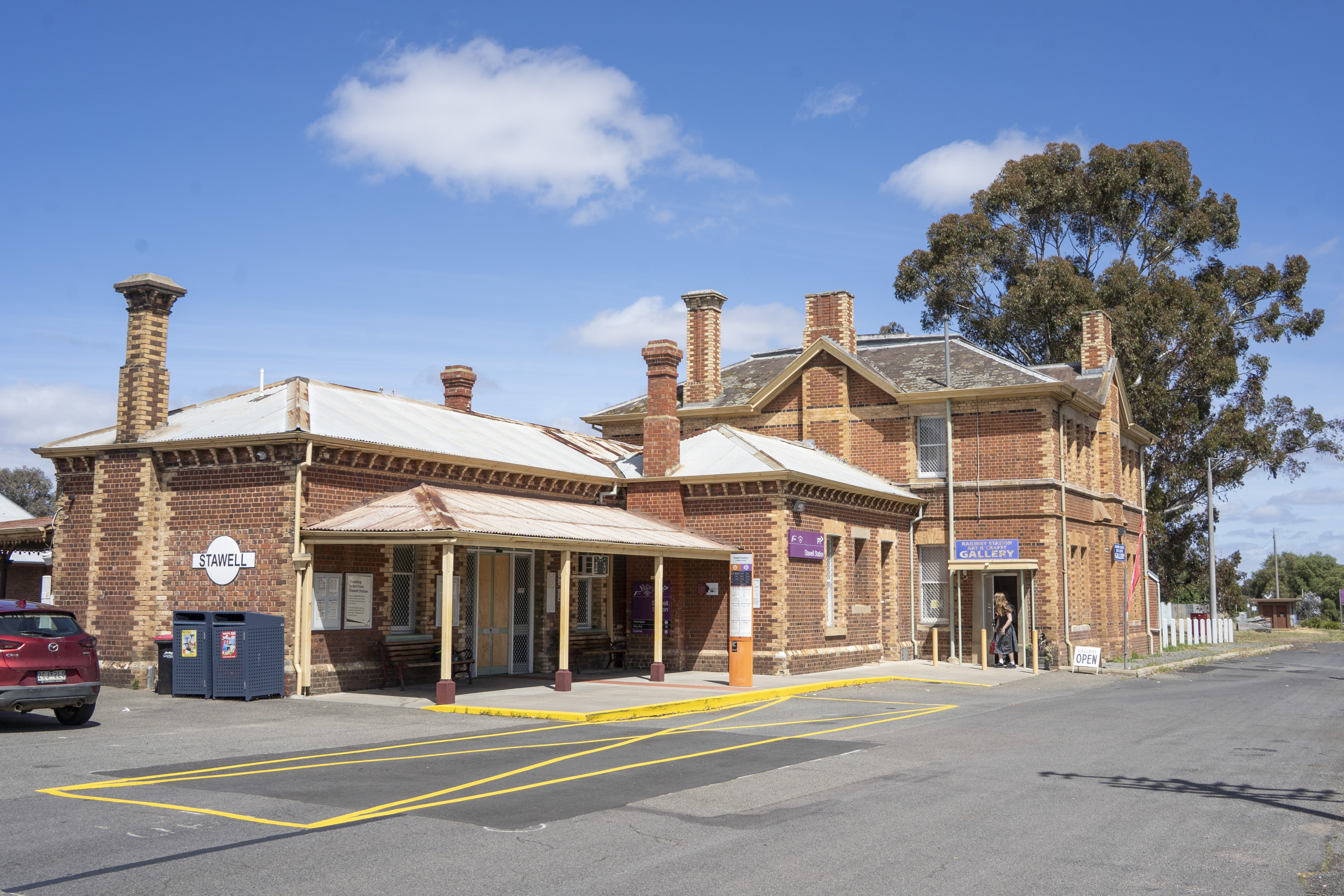
- North side of Stawell railway station in December 2025

General information
- Location: Napier Street, Stawell, Victoria 3380; Shire of Northern Grampians; Australia
- Coordinates: 37°03′34″S 142°46′22″E
- System: Journey Beyond inter-city rail station
- Owner: VicTrack
- Operator: Journey Beyond
- Lines: The Overland Great Southern (Western standard gauge)
- Distance: 241.14 kilometres from Southern Cross
- Platforms: 1
- Tracks: 2
- Connections: Bus; Coach

Construction
- Structure type: Ground
- Parking: Yes
- Accessible: Yes

Other information
- Status: Operational, unstaffed
- Station code: STL
- Fare zone: Myki not available. Paper ticket only.
- Website: Public Transport Victoria

History
- Opened: 14 April 1876; 150 years ago
- Closed: 21 August 1993
- Rebuilt: April 2011
- Former names: Wild Cat (1876-1877)

Services
Preceding station	Journey Beyond	Following station
Horsham towards Adelaide	The Overland	Ararat towards Melbourne
Location
- Location within Victoria

Stawell railway station is located on the Western standard gauge line in Victoria, Australia. It serves the town of Stawell, and it opened on 14 April 1876.

It initially served as the temporary terminus of the line from Ararat until 17 December 1878, when the line was extended to Murtoa.

== History ==
The station was first built in 1877, following the extension of the Serviceton line from Ararat. The Ararat to Stawell railway line was first approved by the Victorian Government by Act No. 475, which passed into law on 25 November 1873. In 1876, the Ararat to Stawell line was completed, and a temporary station was set up just south of the town. This was named Wild Cat, and was only used until the completion of the current station.

Boom barriers were provided at the nearby Seaby Street level crossing in 1978, replacing hand-operated gates.

In 1981, the former water tower was dismantled. The tower dated back to around 1910–15.

Rationalisation of the yard occurred in 1984, including removing two roads at the up end, and No. 4 road also was abolished. This resulted in triple crosses almost impossible to occur.

CTC signalling was provided at Stawell during 1985. Rationalisation also occurred again around this time, with No. 2 road (crossing loop) abolished, along with two signal boxes.

The station was served by V/Line Dimboola services, until these services were withdrawn on 21 August 1993. After passenger services ceased, the Stawell and District Cultural Associated was formed. In March 1995, the association was granted use of the station, with an art gallery was opened.

For a number of years after the discontinuation of the Dimboola service, local residents called for The Overland to make an additional stop at Stawell. When it was announced that The Overland would additionally stop at Nhill in 2007, Stawell, despite representations made, was not included. This was redressed, and in April 2011, The Overland commenced stopping at Stawell, with 60 seats available. A $710,000 upgrade was carried out to the station in preparation for the return of train services.

On the 19th of October 2026, the Victorian Liberals and Nationals committed to restoring V/Line passenger rail service to Stawell by 2029 if they won the November 2026 Victorian election.

== Platforms and services ==
Stawell has one platform. It is serviced by Journey Beyond The Overland services.

Stawell platform arrangement
Platform	Line	Destination
1	The Overland	Melbourne, Adelaide

== Transport links ==
Sandlant Buses operates two routes via Stawell station, under contract to Public Transport Victoria:

- 1 : Stawell – Stawell South
- 2 : Stawell – Stawell North

V/Line operates a road coach service from Stawell station to Halls Gap.

== Gallery ==
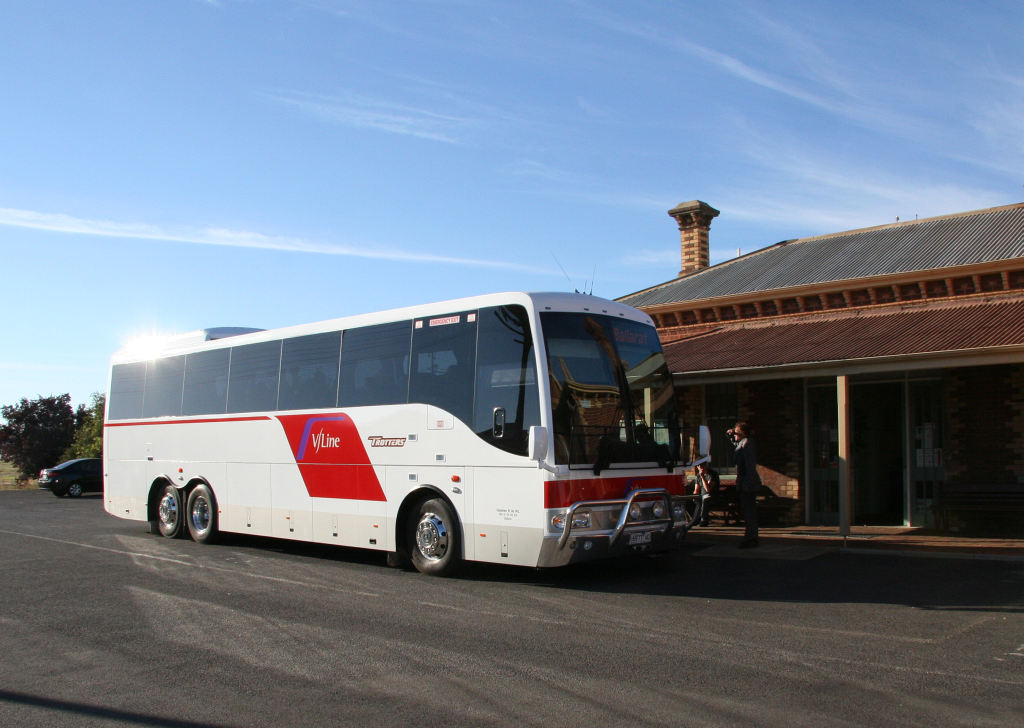
Trotter's Coach Design bodied Mercedes-Benz O500RF-3 at Stawell in January 2009

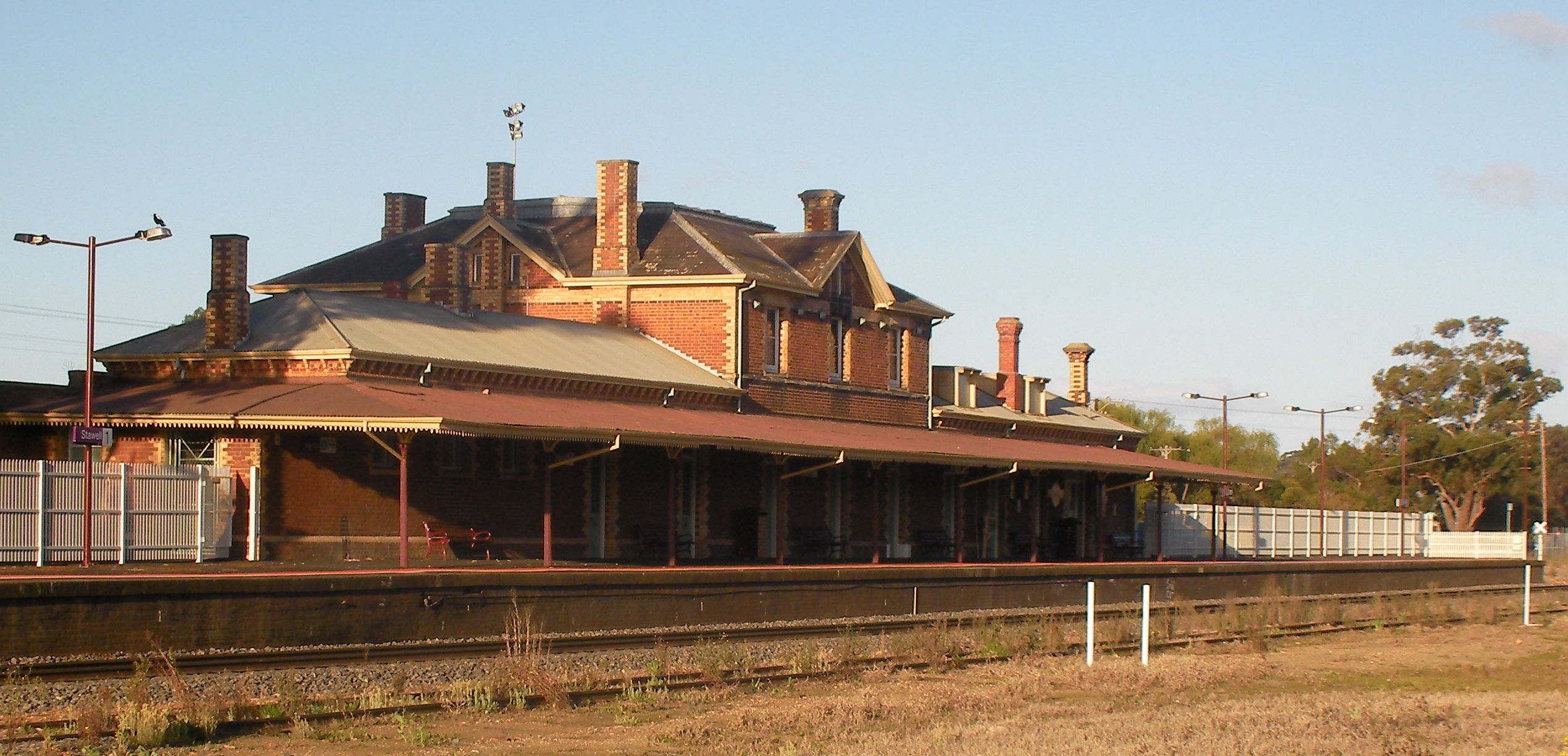
North-east bound view of the station building and platform, August 2011
