= Murtoa railway station =

Former railway station in Victoria, Australia

Murtoa
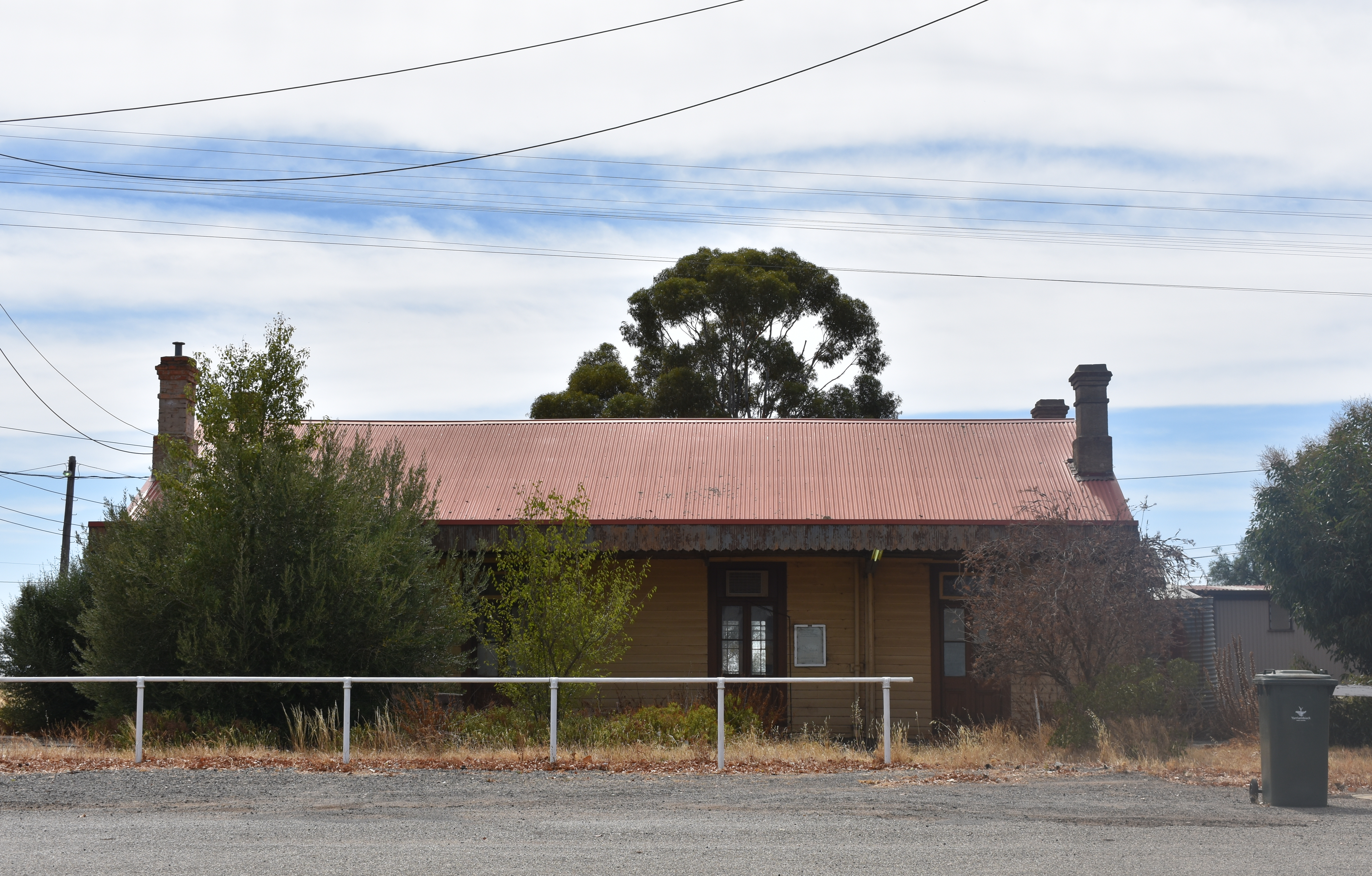
- Station entrance, February 2018

General information
- Coordinates: 36°36′53″S 142°28′14″E
- Owner: VicTrack
- Lines: Western SG; Hopetoun
- Platforms: 1
- Tracks: 4

Other information
- Status: Closed

History
- Opened: 1878
- Closed: 1993

Services
Preceding station	Disused railways	Following station
Stawell	Western SG line	Horsham
Junction	Hopetoun line	Minyip
	List of closed railway stations in Victoria	
Location

Murtoa was a disused railway station on the Serviceton railway line. The station is no longer used as a passenger stop; it is however still an important location for Pacific National as it is where the Hopetoun line junctioned off the main line.

The station is now one of three attractions that make up the Murtoa Museum Precinct, along with the Water Tower Museum and Concordia Cottage.

The station has been brought back to its former glory and is still occasionally used by specialist train trips as a stop.

Inside is a range of memorabilia from its working days and a large model of the station and surrounds at their peak.

The pedestrian bridge over the line was rescued by local residents and is now a feature at nearby Rabl Park.

Much of the station was extensively altered in the 1980s, following the introduction of CTC between Ararat and Serviceton. The signal box was abolished, the number of roads in the yard was reduced and the local signal panel was only switched in if needed, with the former staff depot closing by the end of 1988. Also during 1988, the former turntable was moved to Dimboola.

The station used to have a dock platform for the Hopetoun branch. People in Murtoa have called on The Overland, the interstate rail journey that runs from Adelaide to Melbourne, to make Murtoa an additional stop for the train service.

On the 19th of October 2026, the Victorian Liberals and Nationals committed to restoring passenger rail service to Murtoa by 2029 if they won the November 2026 Victorian election.
