= Adelaide Express =

Adelaide Express may refer to:

- Former newspaper in Adelaide, Australia that became part of the Adelaide Advertiser
- The Overland, train service that operates from Melbourne to Adelaide
