= Hopetoun railway station =

Former railway station in Australia

Coordinates: 35°43′50.5″S 142°21′41.5″E

Hopetoun

General information
- Location: Australia
- Owner: VicTrack
- Line: Patchewollock

Other information
- Status: building demolished, silo remains

History
- Opened: April 1894
- Closed: 1976 (to passengers)

Services
Preceding station	Disused railways	Following station
Goyura	Patchewollock line	Yarto
	List of closed railway stations in Victoria	
Location

Hopetoun railway station was a railway station in Hopetoun, Victoria on the Patchewollock railway line. It was opened in April 1894 and closed to passengers in 1976 with the cessation of the railmotor service from Murtoa railway station. By 1956, the telegraph equipment was removed, by 1970, the turntable was removed and by 1977, the Station master was removed. The station building has since been removed, and only the Grain silos/goods shed remains.
