= Dimboola railway station =

Railway station in Victoria, Australia

Dimboola
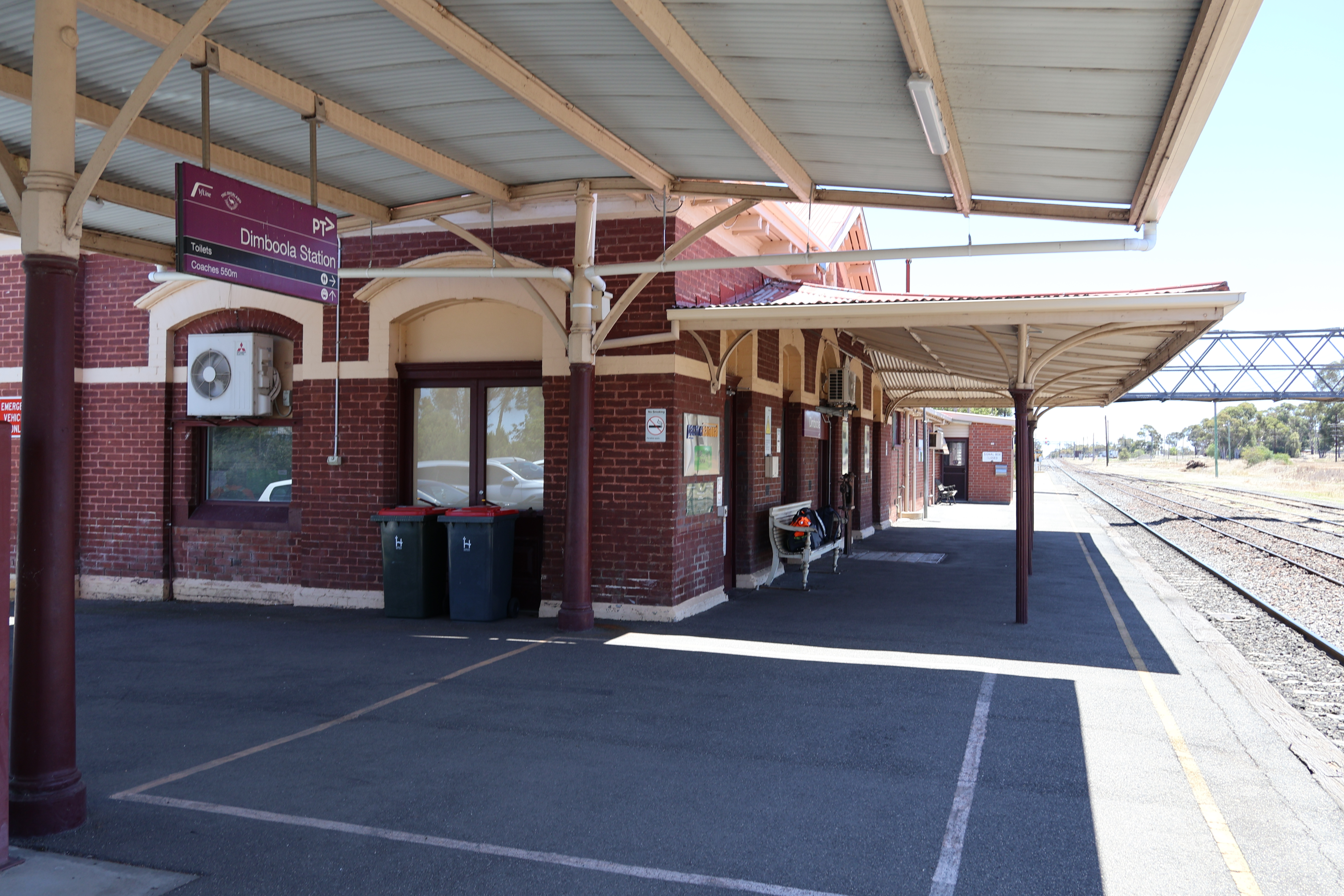
- Dimboola railway station in January 2025

General information
- Location: Hindmarsh Street, Dimboola, Victoria 3414; Shire of Hindmarsh; Australia
- Coordinates: 36°27′08″S 142°01′51″E
- System: Journey Beyond inter-city rail station
- Owner: VicTrack
- Operator: Journey Beyond
- Lines: The Overland (Western standard gauge)
- Distance: 361.77 kilometres from Southern Cross
- Platforms: 1
- Tracks: 4

Construction
- Structure type: Ground
- Accessible: Yes

Other information
- Status: Operational, unstaffed
- Station code: DIM
- Fare zone: Myki not available. Paper ticket only.
- Website: Public Transport Victoria

History
- Opened: 1 July 1882; 144 years ago

Services
Preceding station	Journey Beyond	Following station
Nhill towards Adelaide	The Overland	Horsham towards Melbourne
Location
- Location within Victoria

Dimboola railway station is located on the Western standard gauge line in Victoria, Australia. It serves the town of Dimboola, and opened on 1 July 1882.

In 1980, boom barriers replaced hand-operated gates at the nearby High Street level crossing, in the up direction from the station.

Much of the station was extensively altered in the 1980s, following the introduction of CTC between Ararat and Serviceton. In 1983, a signal panel was provided at the station. It was abolished in 2010.

A turntable, which was originally from Murtoa, was provided in 1988.

Dimboola was the terminus for V/Line services from Spencer Street in Melbourne, until they were closed down on 21 August 1993.

On the 19th of October 2026, the Victorian Liberals and Nationals committed to restoring V/Line passenger rail service to Dimboola by 2029 if they won the November 2026 Victorian state election.

== Platforms and services ==
Dimboola has one platform. It is served by the Journey Beyond The Overland train.

Dimboola platform arrangement
Platform	Line	Destination
1	The Overland	Melbourne, Adelaide
