= Nhill railway station =

Railway station in Nhill, Victoria, Australia

Nhill
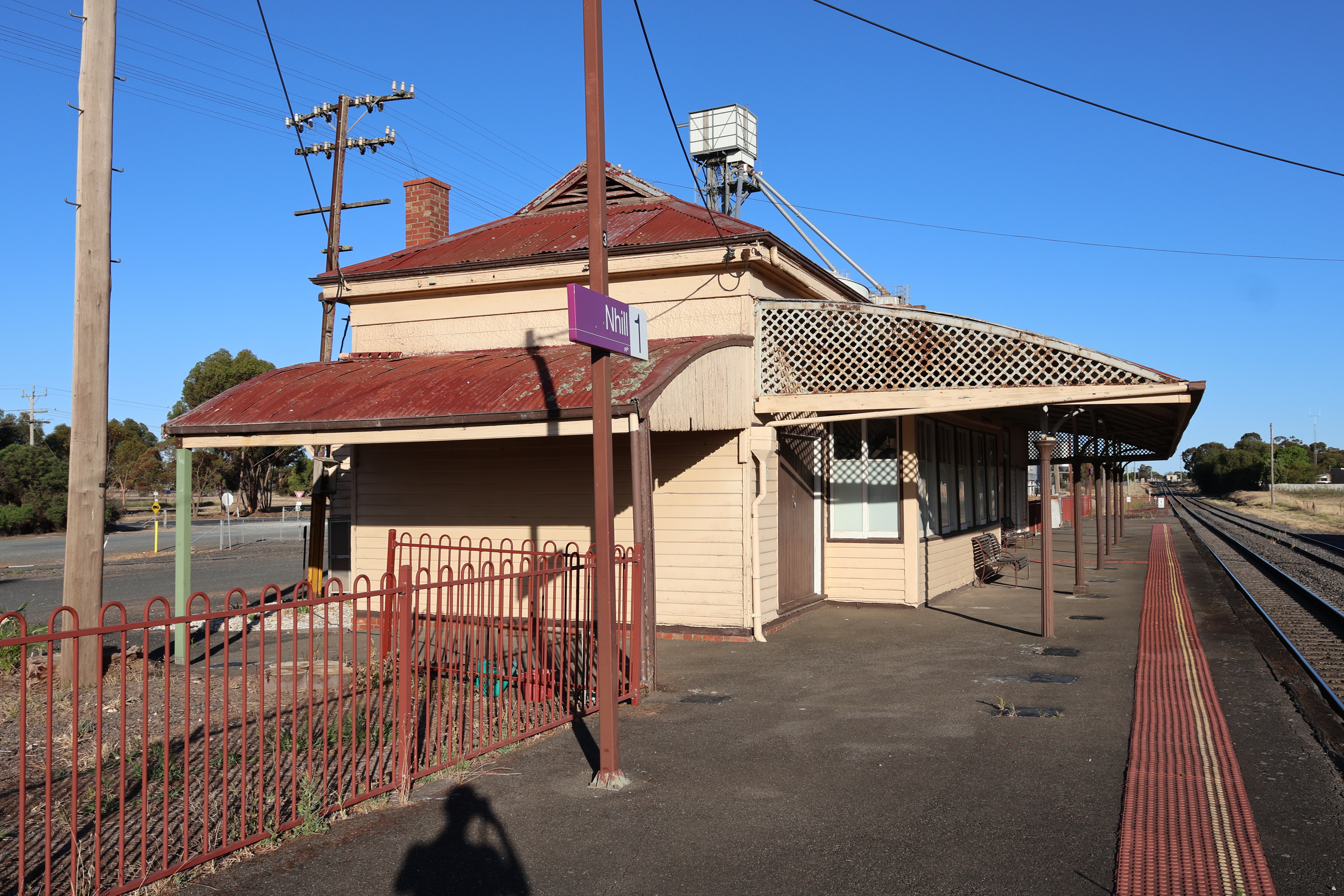
- Nhill railway station in January 2025

General information
- Location: Whitehead Avenue, Nhill, Victoria 3418; Shire of Hindmarsh; Australia
- Coordinates: 36°19′54″S 141°39′14″E
- System: Journey Beyond inter-city rail station
- Owner: VicTrack
- Operator: Journey Beyond
- Lines: The Overland (Western standard gauge)
- Distance: 399.70 kilometres from Southern Cross
- Platforms: 1
- Tracks: 2

Construction
- Structure type: Ground
- Accessible: Yes

Other information
- Status: Operational, unstaffed
- Station code: NHL
- Fare zone: Myki not available. Paper ticket only.
- Website: Public Transport Victoria

History
- Opened: 19 January 1887; 139 years ago

Services
Preceding station	Journey Beyond	Following station
Bordertown towards Adelaide	The Overland	Dimboola towards Melbourne
Location
- Location within Victoria

Nhill railway station is located on the Western standard gauge line in Victoria, Australia. It serves the town of Nhill, and it opened on 19 January 1887.

A number of large grain silos are located in the goods yard, located at the up end of the station.

The last Victorian Railways service to stop at Nhill was the Dimboola to Serviceton service that ceased on 1 December 1978. In March 2007, The Overland passenger service began stopping at the station.

Much of the station was extensively altered in the 1980s, following the introduction of CTC between Ararat and Serviceton, including the removal of the signal box, interlocking and all signals.

== Platforms and services ==
Nhill has one platform. It is serviced by Journey Beyond The Overland services.

Nhill platform arrangement
Platform	Line	Destination
1	The Overland	Melbourne, Adelaide
