= V & SAR The Overland carriages =

Class of Australian passenger cars

Victorian & South Australian Railways The Overland carriages
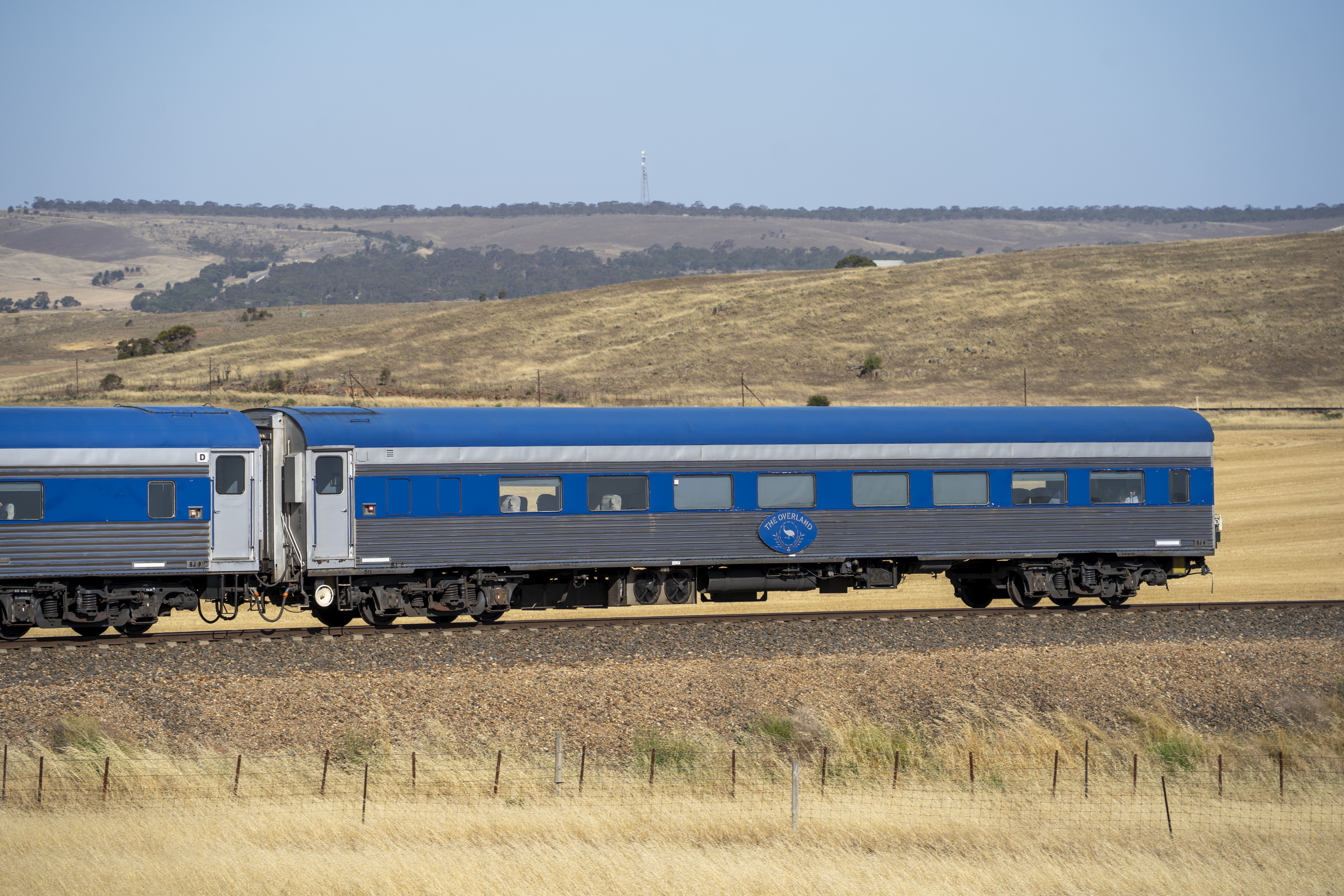
- Carriage BJ6 on The Overland passing through Callington, SA in December 2025
- In service: 1949–present
- Manufacturer: South Australian Railways
- Built at: Islington Railway Workshops
- Constructed: 1949–1972
- Operators: Jointly, South Australian Railways (became Australian National Railways) and Victorian Railways; Great Southern Rail (became Hornblower Group trading as Journey Beyond); Various heritage operators

Specifications
- Car body construction: 75 ft (22.86 m)
- Car length: 78 ft 3 in (23.85 m)
- Width: 9 ft 9 in (2.97 m)
- Height: 13 ft 6.0625 in (4.12 m)
- Doors: Manual swing "stable", 2 per side
- Maximum speed: 115 km/h (71 mph)
- Power supply: Axle generators, later head-end power 415vAC
- Bogies: 53 ft (16.15 m) centres
- Braking system: Westinghouse
- Coupling system: Autocouplers
- Track gauge: 5 ft 3 in (1,600 mm) & 4 ft 8 1/2 in (1,435 mm)

The first passenger cars built specifically for The Overland train service operated by the Victorian and South Australian Railways (V & SAR) were introduced in 1949. By the end of 1951, eight new sleeping cars and six new sitting cars had entered service. Additions to the fleet continued until 1972; in all, 44 carriages were built. About eight were still in service as of 2024 on The Overland operated by Journey Beyond. Other carriages have been transferred to different services or sold.

== Design ==
Sitting cars (AJ, BJ, RBJ & CCL)
- Constructed: 1949–1970
- Number built: 16
- Fleet numbers: 1-3AJ, 1-10BJ, 1-3RBJ, Club Car No.1-3, 1-3CCL
- Capacity: 48 1st class passengers (AJ); 64 2nd class passengers (BJ); 34 2nd class passengers (RBJ); 43 1st class passengers (Club Car/CCL)

Specifications
- Weight: 48.35 long tons (49.13 t) (AJ); 45.7 long tons (46.43 t) (BJ); 45.1 long tons (45.82 t) (RBJ); 42.25 long tons (42.93 t) (CCL/Club Car)

Sleeping Cars (Named, later SJ, JRA, JRB, JTA, JTB, BMC, RZEY, QCAY, CDAY, ADFY)
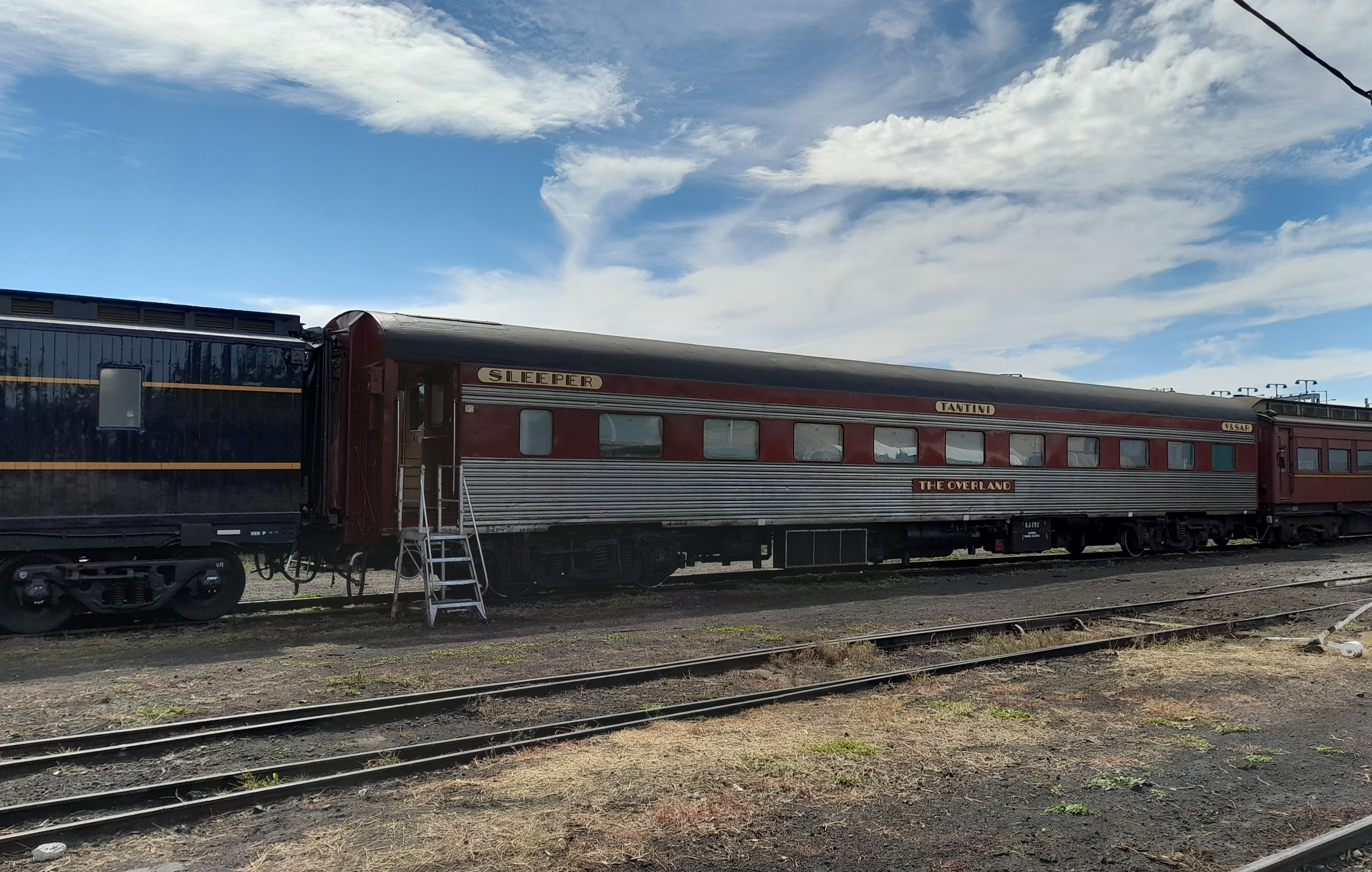
- Tantini (aka SJ 282) as preserved by Steamrail Victoria
- Constructed: 1949–1972
- Number built: 22
- Number preserved: 4
- Fleet numbers: Allambi, Chalaki, Dorai, Juki, Kuldalai, Malkari, Mokai, Mururi, Nanjuri, Nomuldi, Paiti, Purpawi, Tantini, Tarkinji, Tawarri, Weroni, Yankai, Yanni, Sleeping cars No.11-14, SJ281-284, JRA 1–6, JRB 1 & 2, JTA 1–6, JTB 1–4, Sir Hans Heysen, Sir John Forrest,
- Capacity: 20 sleeping passengers, either Roomette or Twinette style. Twinette cars could seat 30 passengers in 'day mode'.

Specifications
- Weight: 52 long tons (52.83 t)

Brake van, power van
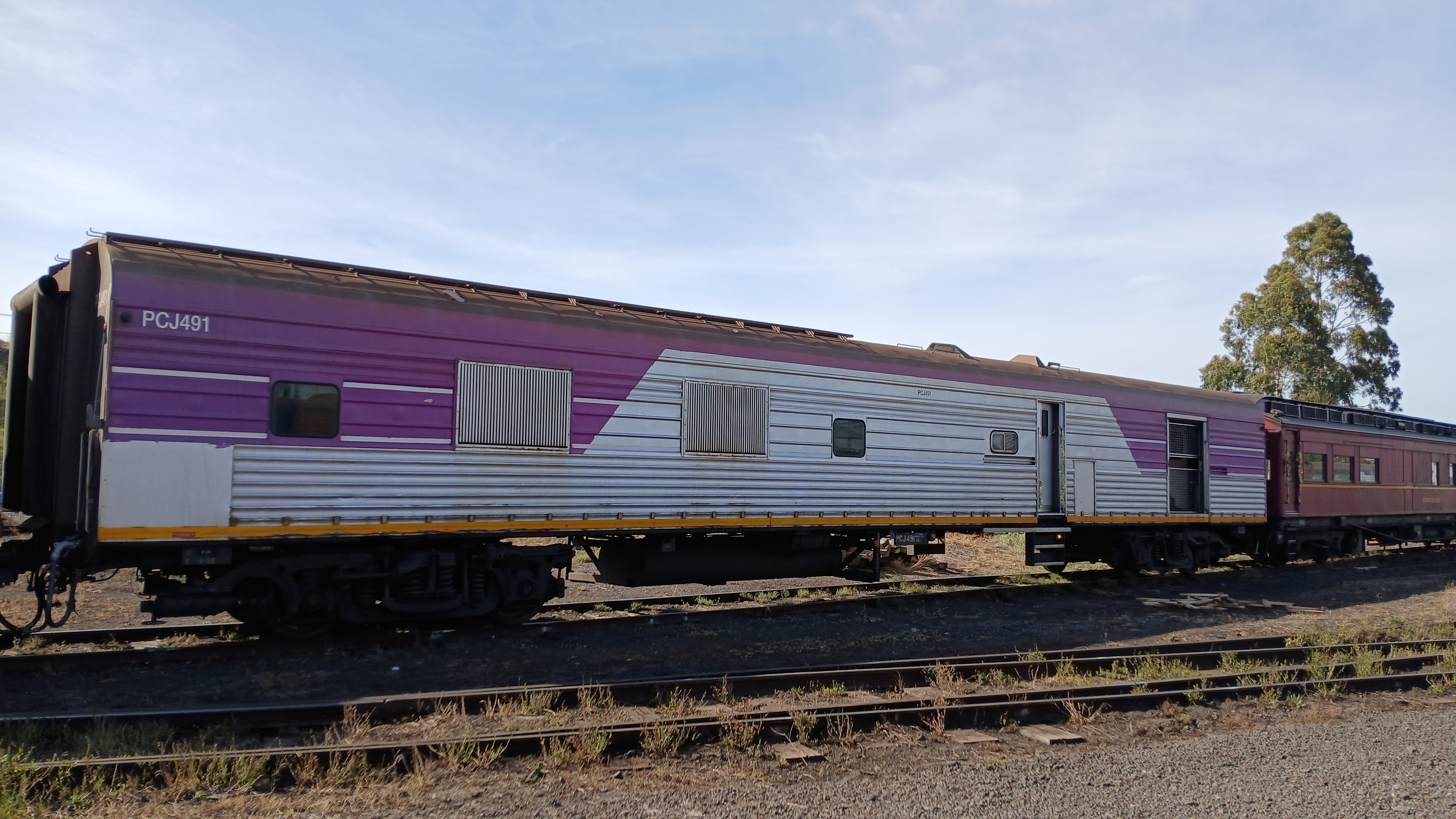
- PCJ491 at Newport Workshops in 2024
- Constructed: 1970–1972
- Refurbished: 2009–2010
- Number built: 6
- Number in service: 4
- Number preserved: 4
- Fleet numbers: 1-2CO, 1-4PCO, PCJ491-493

From 1949, new air-conditioned steel carriages gradually entered service on The Overland train between Melbourne and Adelaide. The construction and exterior appearance had been introduced in the South Australian Railways' cafeteria car, built in 1947, which became the design precursor of Australian interstate cars in the years that followed.

The livery, in regal red paint with a fluted stainless steel panel on each side and a black roof, remained until the 1990s.

The sitting cars were all organised as eight compartments linked to a side corridor, with different fittings as suited to the type. First-class cars seated 48; second-class cars seated 64. The sleeping cars each held 20 passengers, either in ten compartments for two each, connected to a side corridor, or ten compartments either side of a central corridor.

Notably, the Joint Stock carriages were owned by both the Victorian and South Australian railways so each side kept their own records. The hypothesis proposed by Parsons was that the Victorian Railways' records were the dates that the cars first arrived in Melbourne, rather than their entry to service. Parsons notes that 1BJ and 3BJ operated in South Australia for about a month before entering service on the interstate Overland trains, because the BJ cars as a whole were introduced to Overland service in pairs (with one in each direction).

== Construction ==
=== Phase one ===
Six sleeping carriages had been built by the end of 1950; 1951 saw two first-class sitting carriages and a further two sleeping cars entering service, and four second-class sitting cars entered service the following year, for a fleet total of fourteen cars.

=== Phase two ===
To respond to growing patronage, a further two sleeping cars were built in each of 1955, 1956, 1957 and 1958. 1960 saw a further two second-class sitting cars constructed, and in 1962 a third first-class sitting car was constructed.

=== Phase three ===
Construction picked up again in 1966, with two more second-class sitting cars built to a slightly modified design, replacing 1ABS and 2ABS which were returned to the VR fleet. The next year saw two further sleeping cars added, then the final two second-class sitting cars entered service in 1968.

=== Phase four ===
From 1970, the train underwent significant changes. The last of the E type timber carriages were withdrawn from joint-stock service and split between the South Australian and the Victorian Railways. To replace them, two Luggage Vans (CO), three Club Cars, and four Power Vans (PCO) were built for the train; and the remaining rolling stock was converted away from axle-mounted generator sets to instead take power from the generators fitted to the PCO.

Shortly afterwards, the first three second-class sitting cars (1BJ, 2BJ and 3BJ) were modified to include a buffet and were reclassed RBJ. Also around the same time, the Victorian Railways (VR) purchased the South Australian Railways' (SAR) share in the first four Sleeping cars for their use on The Vinelander; these were replaced by 1972 with four new cars, taking on the old identities.

== Operations ==
=== V & SAR era 1949–1975 ===
Following World War II, the VR and SAR agreed that a major upgrade of The Overland service was needed. At the time, the train was formed using a handful of E type carriages, perhaps with the occasional air-conditioned carriage taken from Victoria's fleet.

To provide for the upgrade, a new design of steel carriages was developed, to replace the worst of the E type sleeping carriages. The first car, Allambi, entered service in 1949 as a roomette sleeping car with a central corridor and ten sleeping compartments either side, with room for 20 passengers. The car was fitted with airconditioning and electric lighting, powered by axle-driven generators.

When the carriage was deemed successful, and additional three Roomette sleeping cars (Tantini, Mururi and Chalaki), and two Twinette sleeping cars with a side corridor and ten two-berth compartments. These five entered service in 1950, and with Allambi they displaced some of the E Type carriages which were split between the VR and SAR fleets.

Two further sleeping and six sitting cars were added to the fleet over the next few years, for a total of 14 carriages by the end of 1952.

- Fit HEP 1970
- RBJ 1, 2, 3
- Club Cars could've been RAJ

=== V & ANR era 1975–1997 ===
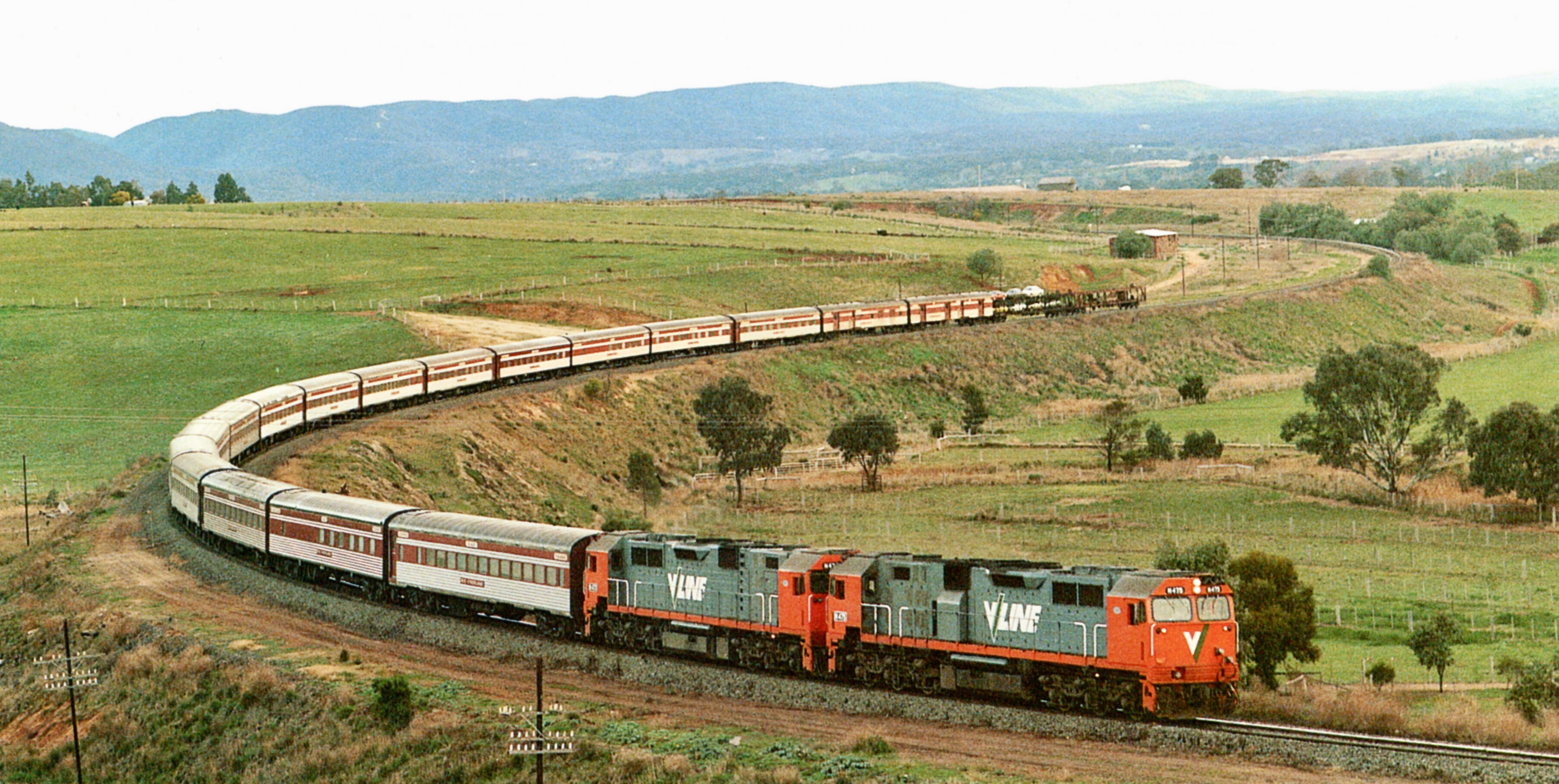
About 1995 near Bacchus Marsh, the familiar sight of matched cars on The Overland overnight service was about to end after 46 years

In 1975, Australian National (AN) took over the non-metropolitan South Australian Railways, and the former SAR share of the carriages was transferred to AN.

In 1986, ANR introduced a new computerised rolling stock tracking system, with the carriages awarded check letters following the first four letters of their names as the class; for example, Yanni was officially known as YANN, with check letter K.

In 1987, the sleeping cars were given computer codes but retained their original names. The codes were JRA and JTA from the original cars built between 1949 and 1958; cars built between 1967 and 1972 were given the codes JRB and JTB.

Between 1987 and 1993, the deployment was thus:

Shared between V/Line and AN

- AJ cars 1, 2 and 3
- RBJ cars 1, 2 and 3
- BJ cars 4–10
- Club Cars 1, 2 and 3
- Luggage Vans CO 1 and 2
- Power Vans PCO 1 through 4
- JRA cars 1 through 6 were Mururi, Chalaki, Nankuri, Purpawi, Juki and Tarkinji
- JRB cars 1 and 2 were Allambi 2nd and Tantini 2nd
- JTA cars 1 through 6 were Nomuldi, Mokai, Malkari, Paiti (later renamed Sir Hans Heysen), Yanni (later renamed Sir John Forrest) and Kuldalai
- JTB cars 1 through 4 were Tawarri, Yankai, Weroni 2nd and Dorai 2nd

With V/Line for The Vinelander

- Sleeping cars 11, 13 were Allambi and Tantini, later SJ281, SJ283.
- Sleeping cars 12, 14 were Dorai and Weroni later SJ282, SJ284.

With the pending gauge conversion of the Adelaide to Melbourne line in 1994–1996 and falling patronage in any case, the oldest cars were withdrawn from service and sold. The remaining fleet – the sitting cars and the newest of the sleeping cars – were converted to standard gauge: sitting cars AJ 1, 2 and 3, roomettes JRB 1 and 2, and twinettes JTB 1, 2, 3 and 4.

In 1993, The Vinelander was withdrawn and the V/Line carriages were placed in storage at Newport Workshops. When V/Line was split into passenger and freight divisions in 1995, the cars were retained by the Victorian State Government rather than being allocated to either group.

==== Dispersal 1995 ====
In 1995, the CO, JRA and JTA cars and power van PCO 2 were removed from AN's rolling stock register and later onsold. During the early 1990s, full ownership of power vans PCO 1 and PCO 3 passed to V/Line and PCO 2 and 4 passed to Australian National. As part of Australian National taking total control of The Overland V/Line retained club car No.1, latter was renamed Victoria.

In 1997, JTA 4 and JTA 5 were sold to Blue Bird Rail, then to Grand Corporate Rail. At some point, they were converted to luxury cars, with some bedrooms retained and others converted to an open lounge and dining area. Under this form the two became BMC1 and BMC2 respectively. Grand Corporate Rail was forced to stop operating by the insurance crisis of 2003, so the cars were sold to Great Southern Railway and renamed Sir Hans Heyson and Sir John Forrest in 2003. JTA 6 was privately purchased in 1998.

Also in 1998, West Coast Railway purchased cars PCO 2, CO 2, JRA 1, 3 and 4, and JTA 1 and 3. They were transferred to Melbourne on standard gauge bogies, then railed to Ballarat North Workshops for reconditioning and use on excursion trips. When West Coast Railway folded in 2004, the cars were dispersed by the Australian Loco & Railway Carriage Company. PCO 2 was immediately sold to V/Line; in 2009, it was reconditioned and renumbered PCJ493, and it operated with PCJ491 and 492 (ex PCO 1 and 3) on the standard gauge service from Melbourne to Albury. After PCO 2, the next two sold were JTA 1 and JRA 3, also in 2004. JTA 1 was sold privately, then again in 2012 and is now in Kaniva, restored, at the Overland Museum. CO 2 and JRA 3 were sold to Rail Experience and held at South Geelong yard, then moved to Newport Workshops in 2012.

In 2007, JRA 1, JRA 4 and JTA 3 were sold by the Australian Loco & Railway Carriage Company to Bluebird Rail Operations. About the same time, Bluebird acquired JRA 2. All four were refurbished as crew cars, and they re-entered service in the period 2008–2010 as, respectively, RZEY 1, 4 and 3, and QCAY 2; the latter for Queensland Rail.

Not much information is available for JRA 5 or JTA 2 immediately following their purchase by Bluebird Rail. At some point JTA2 was sold to Genesee & Wyoming Australia, and JRA5 was sold to Queensland Rail as QCAY5.

=== GSR era 1997–2010 ===
On 1 November 1997, the remaining passenger services operated by Australian National were sold to Great Southern Rail (GSR). The sale included the standard gauge Overland passenger fleet – two roomette and four twinette sleeping cars; three first-class and six second-class sitting cars, three composite second-class sitting cars with buffet, and two club cars. Power van PCO4 was also included in the sale, but at the time it was on broad gauge for the short-lived Explorer train, in a dark blue livery with wide yellow bands. It was converted to standard gauge in 1998 and given a quick coat of grey paint.

In 1999 the carriages were refurbished and repainted to a plain grey scheme at Keswick, and most of the cars had names applied, recycled from the sleeping carriages. Respectively, 5BJ through 10BJ became Mururu, Nankuri, Purpawi (sic), Chalaki and Tarkinji, and PCO 4 became Paite (sic). The three RBJ cars were all named Kookaburra Club Car; the Club Cars 2 and 3 were classed CCL and named Nomuldi and Malkari. AJ1, 2 and 3, RBJ1, RBJ3 and 4BJ were not named following their refurbishment; and shortly afterwards Chalaki was renamed Kildalai (sic). In 2003 Purpawi was corrected to Purwapi.

Then, in 2002–2003, the fleet was sold to a third party consortium and leased back for operational purposes.

A second refurbishment was undertaken in 2006–2007, applicable mainly to the second-class sitting cars. Retention toilets were fitted, with the male toilets shifted to the former ladies' toilet, and the latter shifted into the former powder room. The original male toilets were converted into showers, allowing the cars to be used on The Ghan and Indian Pacific services if and as necessary. At this time RBJ3 was refitted again, this time named Cafe 828. Similarly, CCL2 "Nomuldi" was upgraded to the "Charles Sturt" Outback Explorer lounge car, re-entering service in 2008; and PCO4 had its name removed, along with door replacements and a general overhaul.

In 2010, GSR was looking at selling parts of the fleet for use as crew cars by other operators.

=== Subsequent status ===
In 2011, 8BJ "Mokai", CCL3 "Malkari", RBJ1 and RBJ2 and JRB2 were sold to Genesee & Wyoming Australia and converted to crew cars ADFY1 through 5.

JRB1 was sold to Pacific National and renumbered RZEY2, slotting between RZEY1, 3 and 4. The original RZEY gap was left for Aurizon's QCAY2.

AJ1-3 were also sold though their current ownership is unclear.

As of 2025, the V/Line Passenger Network Service Plan Addenda lists these vehicles as accredited for operation in Victoria:

- Great Southern Rail: BJ4-10, BMC2, CCL2, JTB1-4, PCO4 & RBJ3, all Standard Gauge only.
- Seymour Railway Heritage Centre, leased to V/Line & 707 Operations: JTA6 "Kuldalai"
- Steamrail Victoria, leased to V/Line: SJ283. The Steamrail website also lists SJ282.

Other vehicles were deployed thus:

- Pacific National: RZEY1, 2, 3 and 4.
- Aurizon: QCAY2 and QCAY5.
- CFCL Australia: CDAY1; also AJ 1, AJ 2, AJ 3 stored stripped, not yet converted to crew cars.
- Genesee & Wyoming Australia: ADFY1-5, JRA6 and JTA2.
- VicTrack Heritage allocated to 707 Operations: Victoria, PCJ492 (3PCO), PCJ493
- 707 Operations: SJ284
- VicTrack Heritage allocated to Steamrail Victoria: PCJ491
- Static displays: JTA1 Nomuldi (The Overland Museum at Kaniva), Allambi (National Railway Museum, Port Adelaide)
- Privately owned, stored at Newport Workshops: 2CO, JRA 3 (scrapped early 2020 following fire damage)
- Held at Islington Railway Workshops: 1CO

== Fleet details ==
=== First Class Sitting – AJ ===
1AJ, 2AJ, 3AJ

=== Second Class Sitting – BJ ===
1BJ, 2BJ, 3BJ, 4BJ, 5BJ, 6BJ, 7BJ, 8BJ, 9BJ, 10BJ

=== Second Class Sitting with Buffet – RBJ ===
1RBJ, 2RBJ, 3RBJ

=== Club cars ===
Club Car No.1, Club Car No.2, Club Car No.3

=== Sleeping cars ===
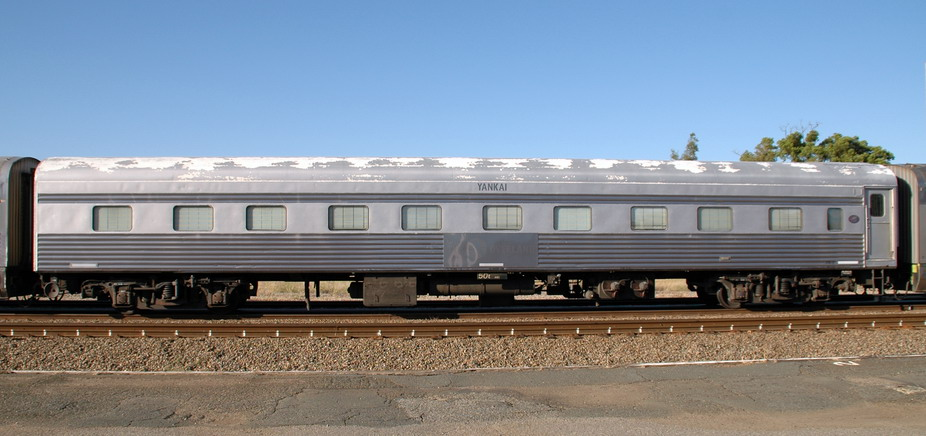
1967 Steel Sleeping Car Yankai (JTB 2) in the 1999–2007 livery

When The Overland service was converted from E type carriages to a new steel, fully airconditioned train, eight new sleeping cars were built. The interiors of these new cars were of a more modern design than the older cars. The roomette cars had a zigzag corridor instead of a straight one, and the compartments had the shape of a trapezium. This enabled the use of the toilet and washbasin units while the bed was still down, not possible in the older roomettes.

In 1949, the classleader, Allambi, entered service, followed by Tantini, Weroni, Dorai, Mururi and Chalaki in 1950 and Nomuldi and Mokai in 1951. Of those, Allambi, Tantini, Mururi and Chalaki were roomette cars with zigzag corridors; the other four were standard compartment-style twinette cars.

The sleeping cars were of two types. Twinette cars had two-berth compartments (as had the E and Mann cars before them), but each compartment had an adjoining toilet and shower room; roomette cars had single-berth compartments either side of a central aisle, and a shower room at the end of the car. The new cars were not numbered, but instead given names based on Aboriginal words related to sleep or dreams.

Additional carriages were built a few years later, with Roomettes Nankuri and Purpawi in 1955, Twinettes Tolkini (later Malkari) and Tandeni (later Paiti) in 1956, Twinettes Yanni and Kuldalai in 1957 and Roomettes Juki and Tarkinji in 1958.

Two further cars were built in 1967, Twinettes Tawarri and Yankai, for a total fleet of eighteen. These last two had a slightly different interior layout.

In 1971, the SAR's share in roomette cars Allambi and Tantini and twinette cars Dorai and Weroni was sold to the Victorian Railways for use on The Vinelander to Mildura. They were repainted dark blue and their names removed; these names were then applied to the same type of new cars built to replace them.

The new sleeping cars, Weroni and Dorai (1971) and Allambi and Tantini (1972) were built with the altered interior matching the 1967 batch (though Allambi and Tantini were still roomettes).

Under Victorian Railways, the cars had blue painted where maroon had previously been used, with Vinelander nameplates on the carriage sides in place of the names. The cars were numbered as sleeping cars numbers 11 to 14, previously Allambi, Tantini, Weroni and Dorai. The New Deal in 1983 resulted in the four Victorian Railways sleeping cars renumbered to SJ 281 to 284, and the carriages were repainted again, this time with orange replacing the blue, with V/Line logos on plates fitted to the left ends.

Under Australian National, the vehicles were allocated classes, with Mururi, Chalaki, Nankuri, Purpawi, Juki and Tarkinji becoming JRA1-6, Nomuldi, Mokai, Tolkini, Tandeni, Yanni and Kuldalai JTA1-6, and Tawarri and Yankai JTB1-2. The second Allambi and Tantini became JRB1-2, and the second Weroni and Dorai JTB3-4. "R" was for Roomette and "T" for Twinette, with "A" or "B" respectively indicating first class for the pre-1967 fleet, or second class for the post-1967 fleet. Therefore it is safe to assume that if the four carriages passed to the Victorian Railways had been retained, they would have been classed as further JRA and JTA units.

=== Power vans ===
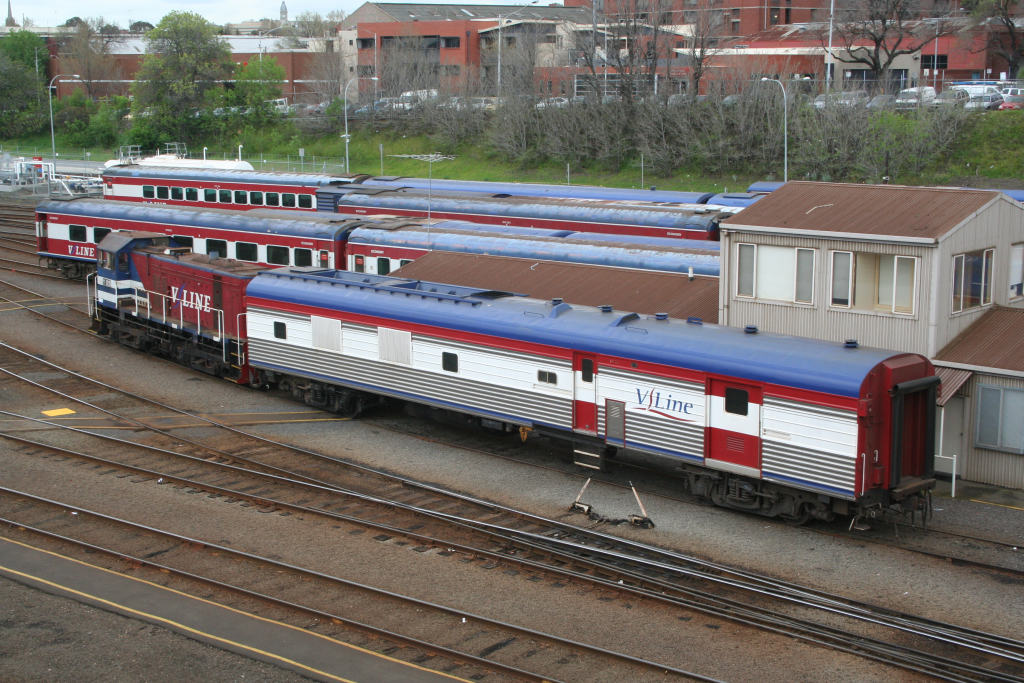
V/Line liveried van PCJ 493

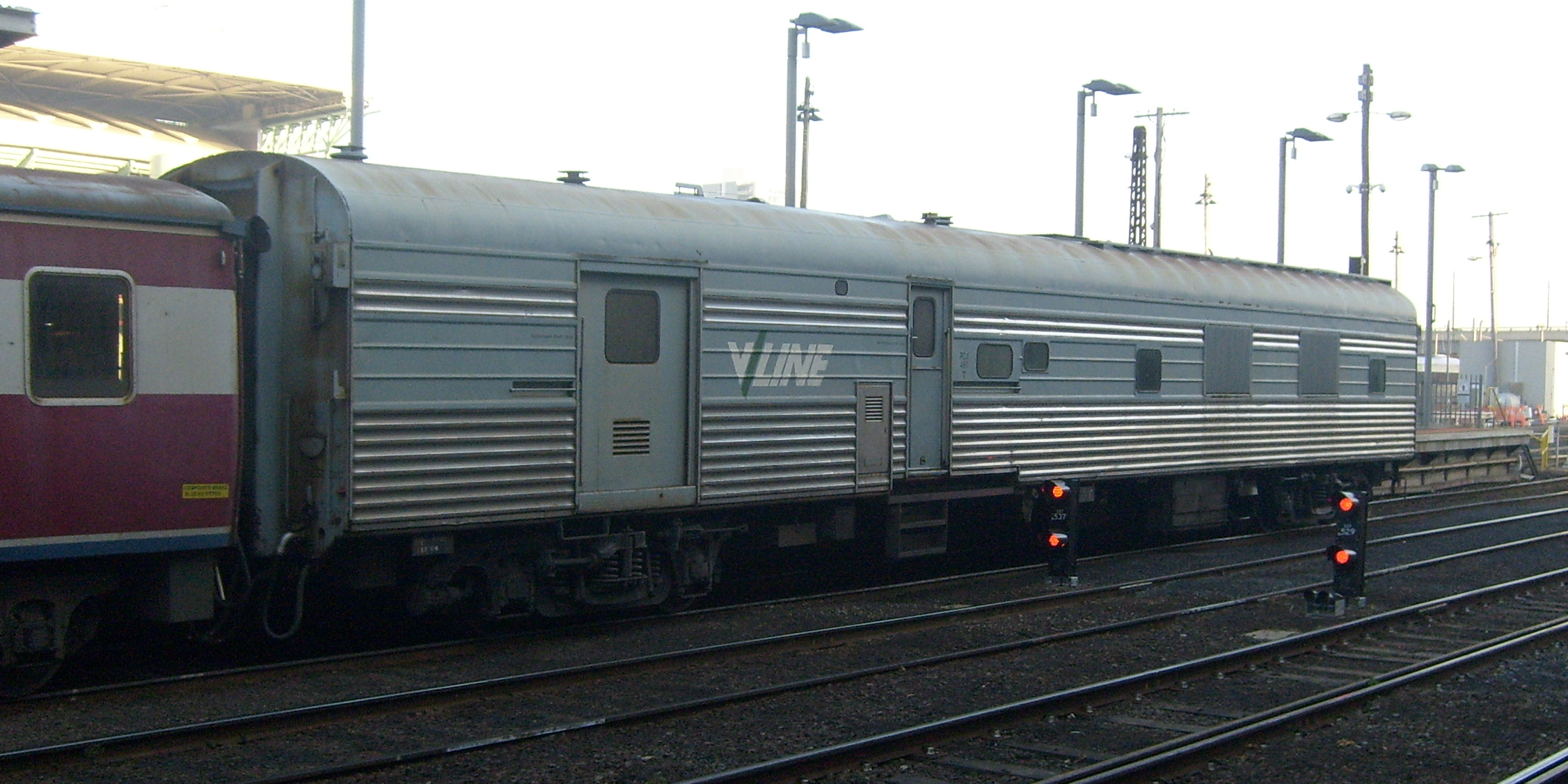
PCJ491 (ex-PCO1) at Southern Cross station

In the early 1970s, The Overland required head end power for air conditioning and lighting. Prior to this time, all electrical power had been supplied by axle-driven generators. As a result, the two railways between them built four PCO vans, numbered 1 – 4, in 1970. They were Joint Stock vehicles owned and maintained jointly by the VR and SAR, and their later, respective incarnations of VicRail and V/Line (VR), and Australian National (SAR). Each had two 162.5 kilowatts (217.9 hp) diesel generators and could carry 10 tonnes (9.8 long tons; 11 short tons) of luggage.

In 1990, the V/Line N class locomotives, which had their own head end power units, took over hauling the Overland and the PCO vans were put into storage. However, they did still make occasional appearances when the head end power on the locomotives failed (e.g. 31 July 1992, returning to Adelaide the following day), or when a Victorian train did not have either an N class locomotive rostered, or a set of carriages with their own underfloor diesel generators (e.g. the Dimboola train on Sat 11 April 1992, engines S300-S310 and consist D347-7BJ-3RBJ-6BJ-ACZ259-3PCO; using mostly spare Overland stock to cater for higher patronage on Senior Citizen's Week).

In or around 1992, V/Line and Australian National took full ownership of two vans each. V/Line acquired PCOs 1 and 3, which it renumbered PCJ 491 and 492 respectively, and AN took PCOs 2 and 4.

==== PCO4: Australian National and Great Southern Rail ====
Under the control of Australian National, PCO4 did return to Victoria occasionally to cover head end power failures of the Overland (e.g. 24 October 1992), In April 1993 Australian National launched a new train, The Explorer, operating primarily in the Barossa Valley in South Australia. The train used locomotive 961, an assortment of steel carriages that had only recently been returned from lease to V/Line, and van PCO4, all painted in a livery of dark blue with wide yellow stripe. When the van was not in use on that train it made runs to Melbourne providing head end power to refrigerated containers on goods trains, and it remained available for The Overland if needed. It was converted to standard gauge for use again on The Overland when the interstate line was converted in 1995, and remained nominally available whenever CLP locomotives were not used to provide head end power. When the combined operations of the Ghan, Indian Pacific and Overland were all sold privately to Great Southern Rail (Australia) in 1997 the CLP engines were swapped for National Rail NR class locomotives, and this necessitated returning PCO4 to active service. It was completely refurbished in 2007 with new diesel generator sets. When PCO4 has been unavailable, an equivalent power van from the Ghan or Indian Pacific (HGM class), or former Southern Aurpra fleets (e.g. PHN2362 or PHN2369) may be substituted.

==== PCO2: West Coast Railway ====
PCO2 remained in storage with Australian National until was purchased by West Coast Railway in 1998. When West Coast Railway ceased operation in 2004, it was acquired by V/Line.

==== V/Line ====
The first record of an Overland power van recoded from PCO to PCJ is dated 21 June 1992, when heritage steam locomotive R707 worked a special train from Camberwell to Seymour, with parlor car Norman and Overland stock 3AJ-6BJ-No.2 Club Car-8BJ-2RBJ-PCJ491. (Note: A reference dated 18 July 1992 exists to a "PCJ1" in Newsrail 03/93, but this is the only such instance and therefore most likely to be a typo.) PCJ492 had been recoded from PCO3 by Tuesday 20 October 1992, with the Overland signs and "V & ANR" logos removed, and it was repainted to V/Line grey by Monday 23 November 1992.

The PCJ vans settled into a roster providing head-end power on trains usually worked by A class locomotives, which were as powerful as the N class but did not have head-end power generators fitted. In the mid-1990s this meant common usage on South Geelong and Bacchus Marsh commuter and evening services, providing power to an FSH set, though they did occasionally run as far as Shepparton and Albury.

PCJ491 and 492 were joined by PCO2 ex West Coast Railway in 2004. In 2009 that car was refurbished and renumbered to PCJ493. All three PCJ vans were converted to standard gauge in 2011 for use on the V/Line Albury service, incidentally sharing the line between Southern Cross and Tottenham with their former classmate PCO4 on Overland trips.

Following the launch of VLocity's on the Albury V/Line rail service in 2022, V/Line began withdrawing the power vans paired with the standard gauge N sets from service and were initially stored. In 2023, PCJ492 and PCJ493 were allocated to 707 Operations, with PCJ 491 being allocated to Steamrail Victoria. In preservation, PCJ492 has had its original identity of 3PCO restored.

=== Luggage vans ===
In 1970, two Joint Stock guards vans were built for the Melbourne to Adelaide The Overland service. They were coded CO, and remained in use until 1994, when they were transferred to Australian National. Both vans were written off of the shared V/Line and Australian National rolling stock register in 1995.

For a brief period in 1992 the CO vans were not available for use on The Overland due to maintenance requirements, and V/Line CP vans 291-294 were substituted on an as-required basis (e.g. CP294 on 3 August 1992).

2CO was sold to West Coast Railway in 1998 and transferred to Melbourne in early December of that year. However, there is no evidence that it was ever restored or utilised by that group. In 2004, when West Coast Railway shut down, the carriage was sold to Australian Loco & Railway Carriage Company for the Murraylander service, but quickly passed on to the Geelong-based group Rail Experience.

== See also ==
Detailed information about the cars, including drawings: VictorianRailways.net.
