= Horsham railway station, Victoria =

Railway station in Horsham, Victoria, Australia

Horsham
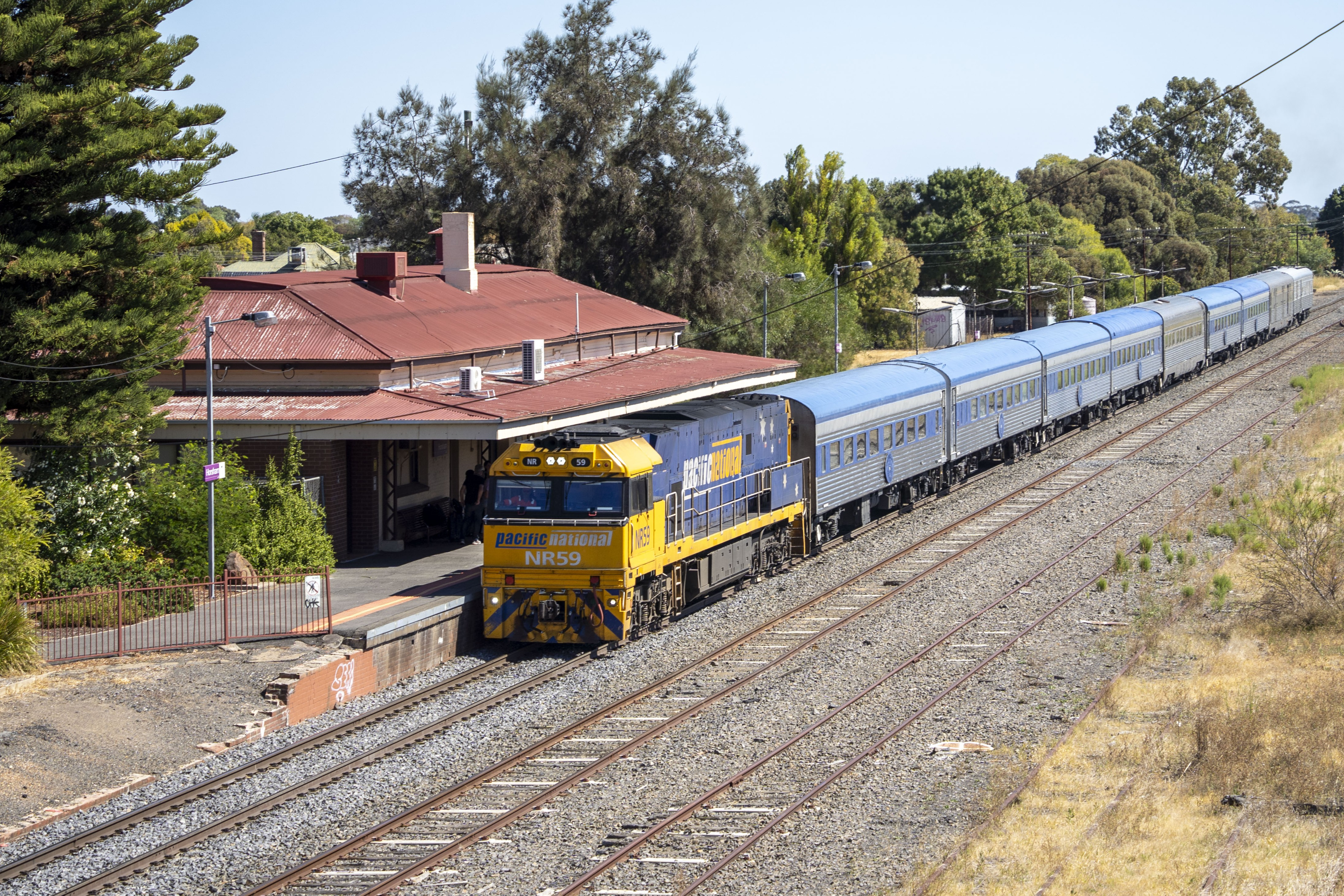
- The Overland arriving into Horsham station bound for Melbourne in March 2024

General information
- Location: Railway Avenue, Horsham, Victoria 3400; Rural City of Horsham; Australia
- Coordinates: 36°42′28″S 142°12′03″E
- System: Journey Beyond inter-city rail station
- Owner: VicTrack
- Operator: Journey Beyond
- Lines: The Overland (Western standard gauge)
- Distance: 327.29 kilometres from Southern Cross
- Platforms: 1
- Tracks: 4
- Connections: Bus; Coach

Construction
- Structure type: Ground
- Parking: Yes
- Accessible: Yes

Other information
- Status: Operational, unstaffed
- Station code: HRM
- Fare zone: Myki not available. Paper ticket only.
- Website: Public Transport Victoria

History
- Opened: 5 February 1879; 147 years ago
- Closed: 21 August 1993
- Rebuilt: April 2007

Services
| Preceding station | Journey Beyond | Following station |
|---|---|---|
| Dimboola towards Adelaide | The Overland | Stawell towards Melbourne |
Location
- Location within Victoria

Horsham railway station is located on the Western standard gauge line in Victoria, Australia. It serves the city of Horsham, and it opened on 5 February 1879.

== History ==
Horsham was officially opened on 5 February 1879 by the Governor of Victoria, George Bowen, along with the opening of the new railway line. The station celebrated its centenary on 5 February 1979.

In 1970, a number of track alterations took place at the station, including the removal of a carriage dock, a coal stage, and the siding leading to the former turntable. In 1971, the Urquart Street overpass, located at the up end of the station, was provided, replacing two level crossings in the area. In 1972, another siding was abolished.

The former signal box was replaced with a signal panel in 1976, with the signal box demolished soon after. It was thought to be one of the oldest buildings in Horsham. In 1985, CTC signalling was provided at the station.

The station was served by V/Line Dimboola services, until the service was withdrawn on 21 August 1993.

In April 2007, the station was upgraded at a total cost of $490,000. However, only a small section of the platform was resurfaced, which has resulted in passengers having to move up or down the train to access the platform.

On the 19th of October 2026, the Victorian Liberals and Nationals committed to restoring V/Line passenger rail service to Horsham by 2029 if they won the November 2026 Victorian election.

== Platforms and services ==
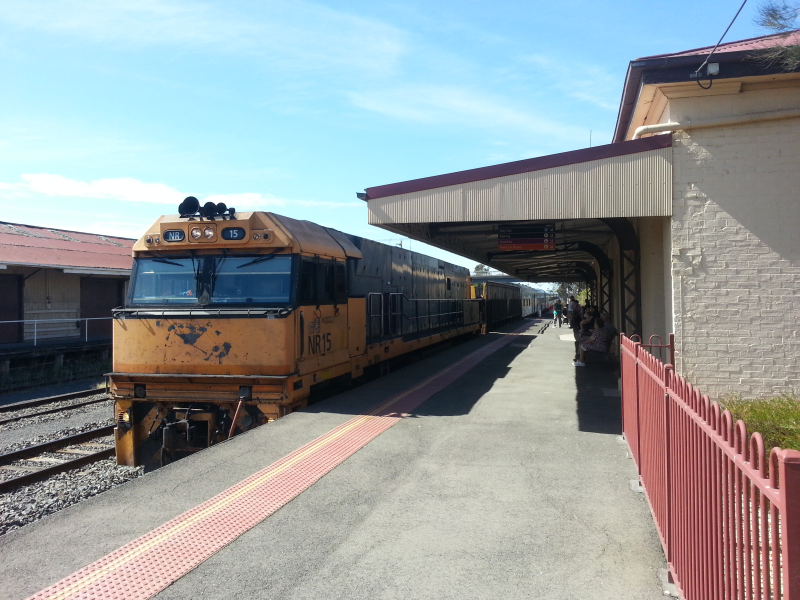
An Adelaide-bound Overland passenger service at Horsham, April 2013

Horsham has one platform. It is serviced by Journey Beyond The Overland services.

Horsham platform arrangement
| Platform | Line | Destination |
|---|---|---|
| 1 | The Overland | Melbourne, Adelaide |

== Transport links ==
Horsham Transit operates two routes via Horsham station, under contract to Public Transport Victoria:

- 1 : Natimuk Road – Shirley Street
- 5 : to Roberts Avenue

V/Line does not operate road coach services via Horsham station, instead serving an interchange in the town centre.
