= Hopetoun railway line =

Railway line in Victoria, Australia

Patchewollock

Overview
- Other name: Hopetoun
- Status: open to Hopetoun, closed beyond
- Owner: VicTrack
- Termini: Murtoa; Patchewollock
- Connecting lines: Serviceton
- Stations: 20

History
- Opened: 1886
- Closed: December 1986 beyond Hopetoun

Technical
- Track gauge: 1,435 mm (4 ft 8 1/2 in)
- Old gauge: 1,600 mm (5 ft 3 in)
- Signalling: Train Order Working

The Patchewollock railway line (also known as the Hopetoun railway line) is a standard-gauge railway line branching off of the Serviceton railway line. The line was opened in stages beginning from Murtoa to Warracknabeal on 12 May 1886 and reaching Patchewollock in May 1925.

== History ==
The line was opened in stages from Murtoa to Warracknabeal on the Twelfth of May, 1886, Warracknabeal to Beulah on the Fifth of January, 1893, Beulah to Hopetoun on the Sixth of March, 1894 and finally Hopetoun to Patchewollock sometime in May 1925.

The line was constructed in large part due to the pastoralist Edward H. Lascelles heavily lobbying for the construction of the line. He began construction of the line as a private line however the construction of the line was completed by the Victorian Railways.

The line beyond Hopetoun was ripped up in December 1986 and on the first of April, 1995 the line was converted from Broad to Standard-gauge.

== Line Guide ==
Murtoa

Coromby

Minyip

Nullan

Sheep Hills (formerly Tarkedia)

Warracknabeal

Warrackside siding

Batchica siding

Lah

Brim

Galaquil

Beulah

Rosebery

Goyura

Hopetoun

Burroin siding

Dattuck siding

Yarto

Willa

Patchewollock
