= Western standard gauge railway line =

Railway line in western Victoria, Australia

Overview
- Status: Operational passenger services from Southern Cross to Nhill and Adelaide
- Owner: NRC (1995–1998); ARTC (1998–Current)
- Locale: Victoria, Australia
- Termini: Southern Cross; Serviceton
- Continues as: Adelaide–Wolseley line
- Connecting lines: Adelaide–Wolseley; Avoca; Geelong–Ballarat; Dynon–Tottenham; Gheringhap–Maroona; Hopetoun railway line; Newport–Sunshine; North East standard gauge; Portland; Serviceton; Yaapeet
- Stations: 7 current stations

Service
- Type: Victorian railway line
- Services: The Overland; Shared tracks: Dynon–Tottenham, Newport–Sunshine
- Operators: Australian National (1995–1997); NRC (1995–2002); SCT Logistics (1995?–Current); Great Southern Rail (GSR) (1997–2022); CFCLA (1998?–2021); Freight Victoria (1999–2000); Freight Australia (FA) (2000–2004); Pacific National (PN) (2002–Current); Southern Shorthaul Railroad (SSR) (2003?–Current); Journey Beyond (2019–Current); One Rail Australia (2020–2022); Rail First (2021–Current?); Aurizon (?–Current?); CRT Group (?–2014); Genesee and Wyoming Australia (?–2020); Qube (?–Current?); Sadleirs (?–Current)

History
- Work began: 1994
- Opened: Southern Cross to Tottenham Yard on 3 January 1962; Tottenham Yard to Wolseley on 23 May 1995
- Completed: 23 May 1995

Technical
- Line length: 531.759 km (330.42 mi)
- Num of tracks: Double track: Southern Cross to Tottenham; North Geelong Yard to Moorabool River; Single track: Tottenham to North Geelong Yard; Moorabool River to Wolseley
- Track gauge: 4 ft 8 1/2 in (1,435 mm)

The Western standard gauge railway line is a standard-gauge railway line in western Victoria, Australia. Completed in 1995, it forms part of the Melbourne–Adelaide rail corridor and serves as the principal interstate rail link between Victoria and the western states. The line replaced a number of former broad gauge routes which were gauge converted, and today sees both intrastate and interstate freight traffic, as well as the twice weekly (in each direction) The Overland passenger service. Major towns on the route include Geelong, Ararat, Horsham and Dimboola.

== History ==
The first inter-capital link between Melbourne and South Australia was completed in 1887 when the Victorian Railways line was extended to Serviceton on the state border. Known as the Serviceton line, it passed westward from Melbourne through Geelong, Ballarat, Ararat, Stawell, Horsham and Dimboola. In 1889, the direct Melbourne–Ballarat route was opened.

In the 1970s, most interstate lines in Australia began to be converted to standard gauge. By the 1990s, with Adelaide to Melbourne the only interstate link not converted, various proposals were made for gauge conversion. Two main options were put forward:

- via Ballarat: a new track or dual gauge to Ballarat, then conversion of the line west
- via Geelong: a new track to Geelong, dual gauge to Gheringhap, then conversion of the line via Cressy, followed by conversion of the line from Ararat.

Businesses and industry in Geelong and Ballarat wanted to be on the main interstate route. However, the Geelong route prevailed because although it was the longer of the two, it avoided the steep grades of the Ballarat route. The line via Geelong was converted in 1995 with funding from the federal government's One Nation infrastructure program. The secondary Portland, Yaapeet and Hopetoun lines were also converted, and a dual-gauge link was provided to Maryborough to permit grain from the north-west to reach the port at Portland.

== Infrastructure ==
The line is standard gauge, except for dual gauge on the Newport – Sunshine freight line, and where it follows the Geelong – Ballarat line. It is single track throughout, with numerous 1500 metre long crossing loops. The line uses Centralised Traffic Control to direct trains. The line is owned by VicTrack and since 1997 has been managed by the Australian Rail Track Corporation.

== Services ==
The main traffic on the line is Melbourne – Adelaide interstate freight, with trains operated by Pacific National and SCT Logistics. Grain services are also operated on an irregular basis by Pacific National and One Rail Australia. A local container freight service also operates from Melbourne to Horsham by SCT Logistics for Wimmera Container Lines. Until July 2008 it was operated by Pacific National, who cancelled it in April then gave it a three-month reprieve. Aurizon and Qube operated the Horsham service until 2014, when it was replaced by SCT's Dooen service, which is where the new container terminal open. For a number of months, both services operated until the Horsham terminal closed down. The only passenger service is The Overland twice weekly (formerly three times weekly until 2013 due to dropping numbers).

== Route ==
The line leaves the North East railway line at Tottenham, then runs south via the dual gauged Newport – Sunshine freight line. From Newport, the line runs parallel to the Warrnambool as far as the North Geelong junction, where the line joins the dual-gauge Geelong–Ballarat line. The line proceeds northwest as far as Gheringhap, where the line branches off as the Gheringhap–Maroona line westwards until it meets the Portland line at Maroona, and heads north to Ararat where it rejoins the former main line.
