= The Overland =

Australian passenger train between Adelaide and Melbourne

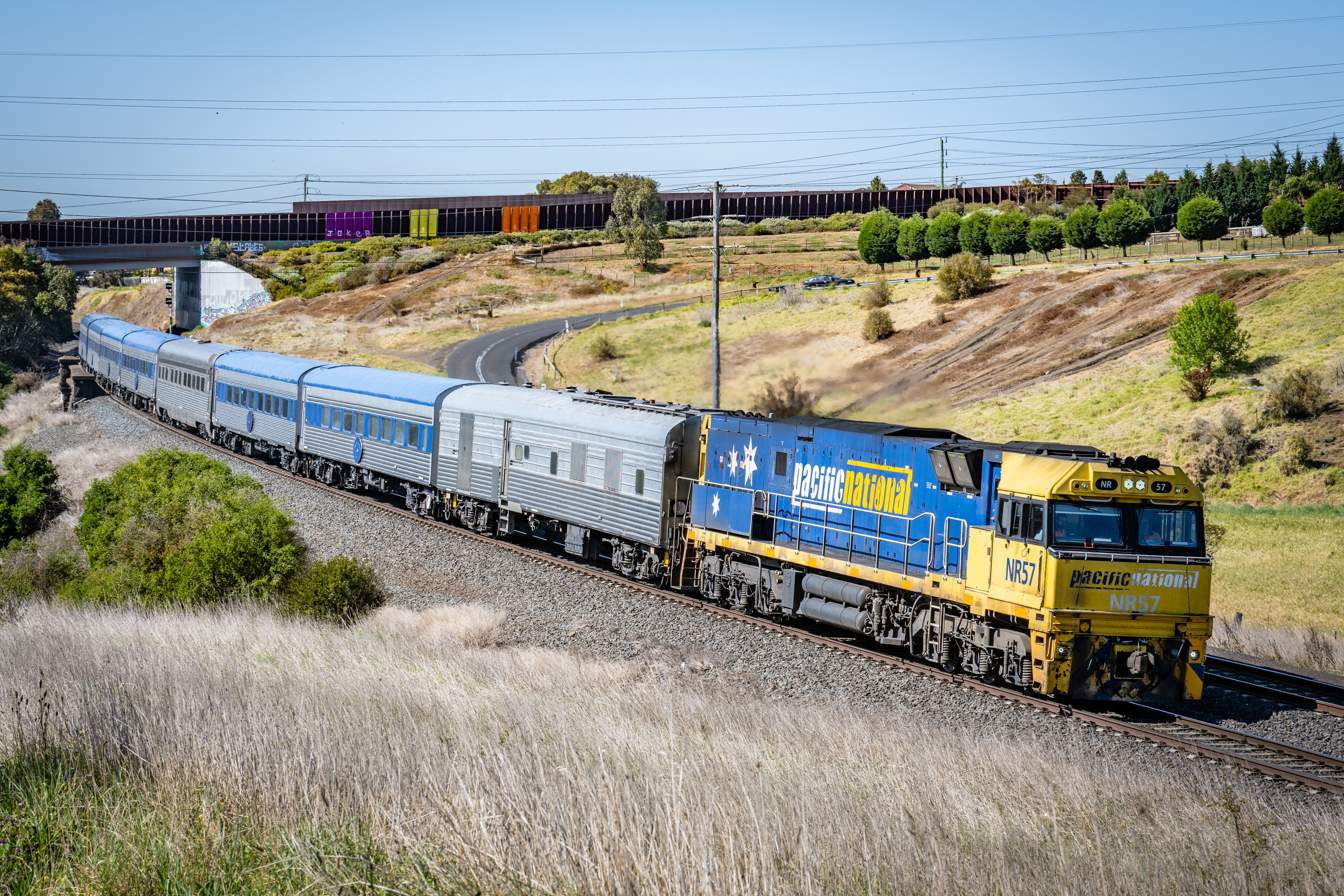
- The Overland outside Geelong, travelling westwards to Adelaide, in 2023

Overview
- Service type: Passenger train
- Status: Operational
- First service: 19 January 1887
- Current operator: Journey Beyond

Route
- Termini: Melbourne; Adelaide
- Distance travelled: 828 kilometres (514 miles)
- Average journey time: 10 hours 30 minutes
- Service frequency: 2 × per week in each direction
- Lines used: Western standard gauge Wolseley-Adelaide

Technical
- Operating speed: 115 km/h (71 mph) maximum

The Overland is an Australian interstate passenger train service that travels 828 kilometres (514 miles) between Melbourne and Adelaide, the capital cities of Victoria and South Australia. Originally an overnight train that stopped at large intermediate stations, it first ran in 1887 as the Adelaide Express, known by South Australians as the Melbourne Express. It was given its current name in 1936. Now operated by private company Journey Beyond as a daytime train stopping less frequently, the train undertakes two return trips a week.

When the route was converted to standard gauge in 1995, it became longer: east-west it is via the port city of Geelong before returning to the original route at Ararat. After departing Ararat the train stops in the Victorian towns of Stawell, Horsham, Dimboola and Nhill before crossing into South Australia, where stops are at Bordertown and Murray Bridge. The final stretch into Adelaide, after crossing the River Murray, is over the scenic Adelaide Hills.

The train contains Red Premium and Red seated accommodation and a bar/lounge car, Café 828.

== History ==
=== Early history ===
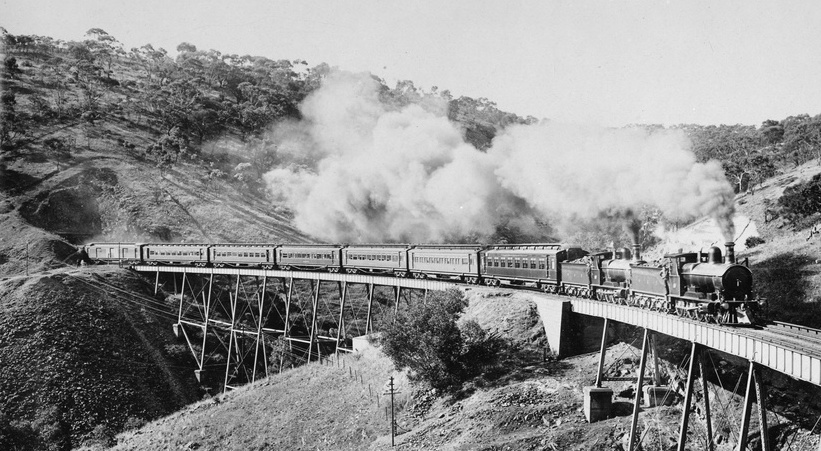
Heavy passenger cars, steep grades and sharp curves in the Adelaide Hills necessitated two locomotives in the early days of the Adelaide/Melbourne Express, before "Big Power" arrived

The Overland originated as the Intercolonial Express when the Victorian Railways' Western line was extended to join the South Australian Railways line at Serviceton on the state border. As both railways were 1600 mm (5 ft 3 in) broad gauge, a direct through-service was possible – the first such service to connect two Australian state capitals. The first trains ran from 1 July 1886, though the new railway was not officially inaugurated until 19 January of the following year using jointly owned rolling stock. Speed restrictions were severe on the Victorian side, where ballasting had yet to be completed in many places. These early services were slow: a westbound departure from Spencer Street at 6:30 a.m. would not arrive in Adelaide until 9:30 p.m. the following day, having taken an overnight stop at Dimboola.

The train was later called the Adelaide Express (westbound), or the Melbourne Express (eastbound) and ran a daily overnight service in each direction, with opulent Mann Boudoir sleeping cars. From 1907, new E type side corridor sitting and sleeping cars of Victorian Railways design were introduced. More cars of these designs were added until 1923, and in 1928 two all-steel sleeping cars and a dining car were imported from Pullman Company in the United States, these being the heaviest passenger cars ever used in Australia. A dining car was included between Melbourne and Ararat from 1927, and between Adelaide and Serviceton from 1928, but with the onset of the Great Depression in 1930 these services were withdrawn until the mid-1930s, and finally ceased after the outbreak of World War II.

In 1926, the South Australian Railways had introduced 500 and 600 class locomotives for duties that included hauling the heavier train over 200-metre (660-foot) curves and 1 in 45 grades: the smaller-wheeled 500 class through the difficult Adelaide Hills and the large-wheeled 600 class across the plains to the Victorian border south of Tailem Bend. These were the largest locomotives in Australia at that time. In 1936 the train was renamed The Overland, and the original deep red livery was replaced by green and yellow with black horizontal lining. For the makeover the SAR semi-streamlined most of its 500 class locomotives by applying a smooth casing over the multiplicity of piping and plumbing and a valance on the side. In 1941 Victorian steam locomotive H220 was introduced to service; it was intended to haul the train but never entered regular Overland service because its weight exceeded the rating of the track. For more than 40 years Victorian Railways used A2 class locomotives, usually in pairs.

=== Post-war history ===
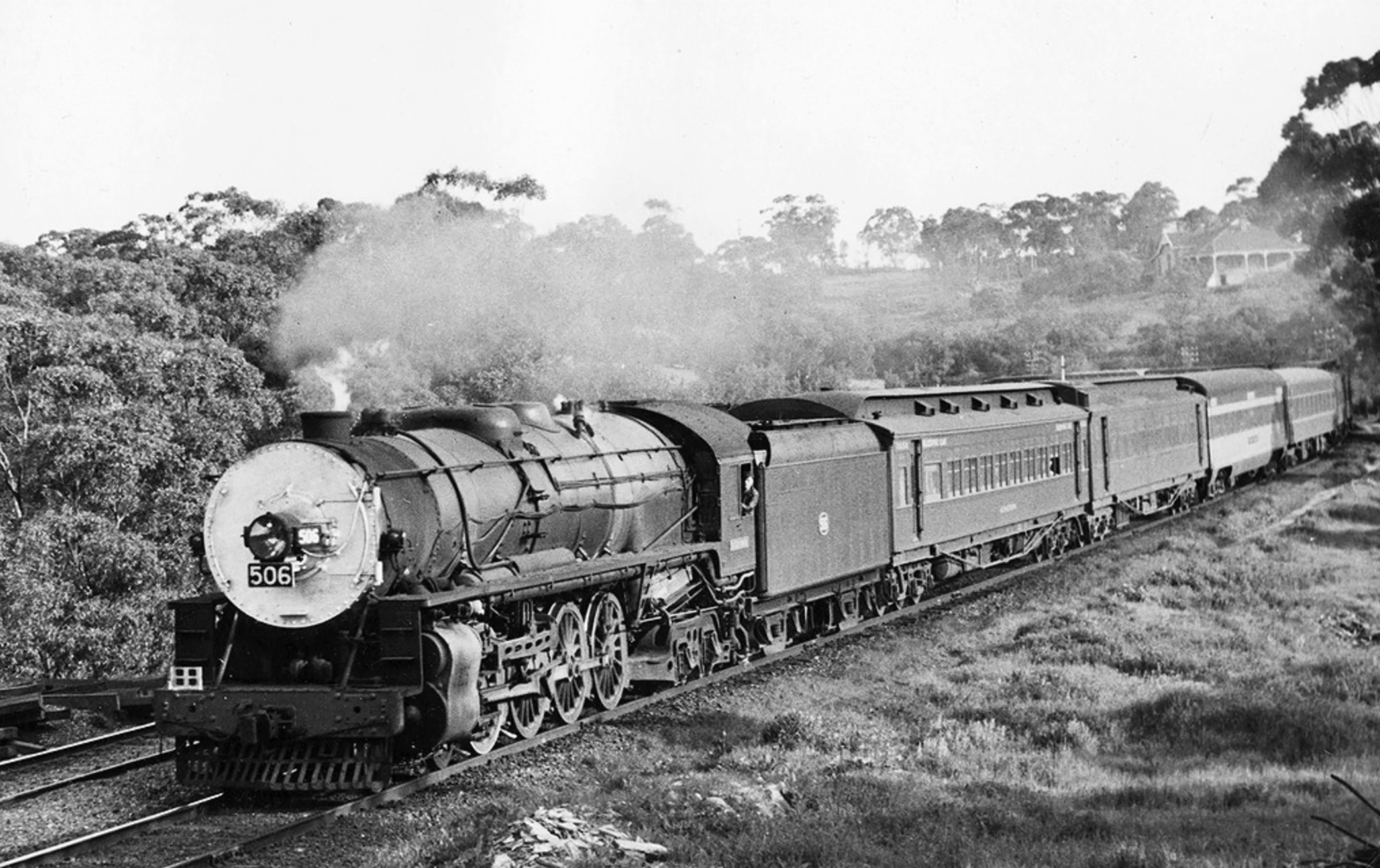
In 1951, "Big Power" steam locomotives would soon be superseded by diesel-electrics and wooden passenger cars of The Overland would be replaced by all-steel air-conditioned cars, one of which is in this train

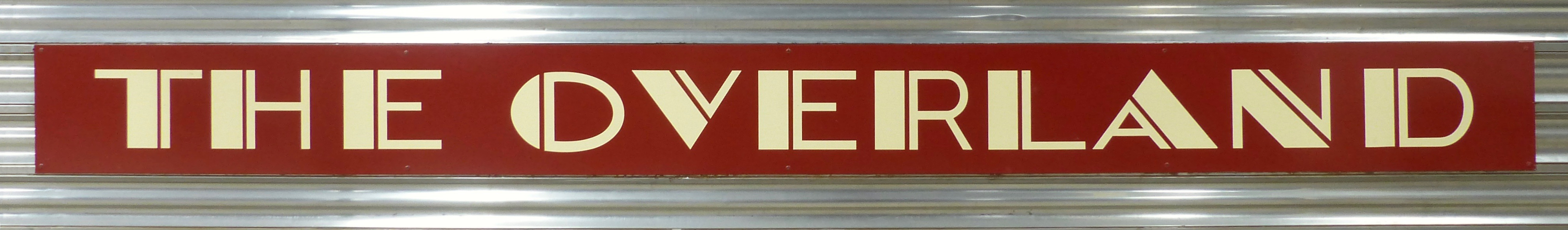
The lettering style introduced with The Overlands rebranding in 1949

In 1946, a new style of sleeping compartment was being tested, and a mock-up of part of a carriage was built for display in Melbourne and Adelaide. The carriage portion was externally painted in green and black with yellow. The sleeping cars were of two types. Twinette cars had two-berth compartments (as had the E and Mann cars before them), but each compartment had an adjoining toilet and shower room; roomette cars had single-berth compartments either side of a central aisle, and a shower room at the end of the car. The maroon sleeping cars from 1949 onwards were 16 in number, later 18, and were given Aboriginal names that were painted on the sides of the cars. The eight roomette cars were Allambi, Chalaki, Juki, Mururi, Nankuri, Purpawi, Tantini, and Tarkinji; the ten twinette cars Dorai, Kuldalai, Malkari, Mokai, Nomuldi, Paiti, Tawarri, Weroni, Yankai, and Yanni. From 1949 the train moved into the modern era, with new air-conditioned steel cars gradually entering service, in maroon with a fluted stainless steel panel on each side and a black roof. This livery remained until the 1990s.

In 1956, the journey was scheduled to take 13 1/2 hours, including 15 scheduled stops. In 2025 the duration was 10 1/2 hours, stopping at 8 places.

On 7 September 1951, the westbound service collided with the eastbound service at Serviceton station with four A2 class locomotives destroyed and one fatality. Diesel locomotives took over in 1953, with the introduction of the South Australian 900 class and Victorian B class. The superior acceleration of the latter allowed 70 minutes to be shaved off the journey time without exceeding the 60 mph (97 km/h) limit. In due course the locomotives were superseded by the 930, S, X and N class locomotives.

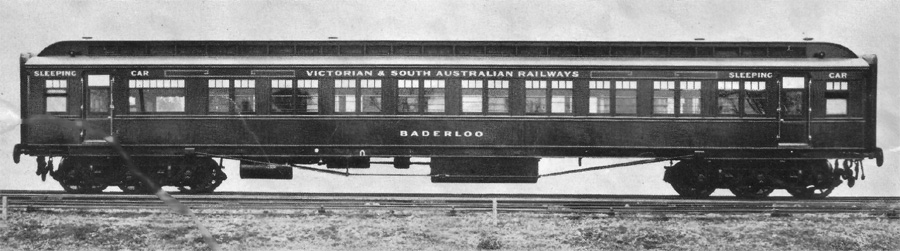
Victorian and South Australian Railways "joint stock" sleeping car Baderloo circa 1910

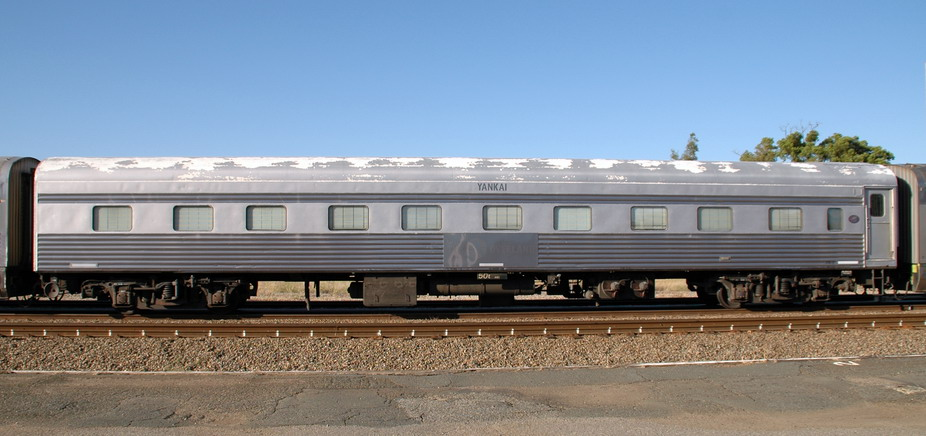
1967 steel sleeping Car Yankai (JTB 2) in the 1999–2007 livery

Twinette cars Tawarri and Yankai were added in 1967, and these also followed the newer style of interior. Thus from the early 1970s onwards in the newer style there were two roomette cars, Allambi and Tantini, four twinette cars, Dorai, Tawarri, Weroni, and Yankai. In 1971, roomette cars Allambi and Tantini and twinette cars Dorai and Weroni were sold to the Victorian Railways for use on The Vinelander to Mildura, and replaced with new carriages. They were repainted dark blue and their names removed; these names were then applied to the same type of new cars built to replace them. The interiors of these new cars were of a more modern design than the older cars. The roomette cars had a zigzag corridor instead of a straight one, and the compartments had the shape of a trapezium. This enabled the use of the toilet and washbasin units while the bed was still down, not possible in the older roomettes.

By the 1970s the train was referred to in the railfan community as The Overdue, reflecting its regular late arrivals due to operating on an almost entirely single-line corridor. As of 1972 only 31 mi (50 km) of the total 483 mi (777 km) route length was duplicated, and the train had to pass multiple other freight and passenger trains on each run. From 1963 to 1973 the arrival time at Spencer Street fluctuated between 8:35 am and 8:57 am; the Melbourne-bound schedule included ten minutes leeway between Ararat and Ballarat, and would be able to run Ballarat to Melbourne without losing time even if encountering significant track speed restrictions due to maintenance.

In 1975, the Australian National Railways Commission, trading as Australian National, took over the South Australian Railways and became joint operator of the train with the Victorian Railways. In 1984, the Adelaide terminus was changed from Adelaide station to Keswick Terminal in Adelaide's Park Lands. A snapshot of the service in November 1990 included a motor car carrier; two sleeping cars; a club car; another two sleeping cars; a first-class sitting car; a second/buffet car; a second sitting car; and a luggage van, hauled by two N class locomotives. In holiday seasons the train was regularly built up to 16 carriages.

From 5 May 1986 interstate mail ceased to be conveyed by The Overland, instead swapping to road haulage.

From 1994, the train was operated solely by Australian National, and in 1995, the entire Melbourne to Adelaide line was converted from 1600 mm (5 ft 3 in) broad gauge to 1435 mm (4 ft 8 1/2 in) standard gauge. Bogies on the train underwent a corresponding conversion and Australian National began operating their CLP class locomotives on the service. A new route, 51 kilometres (32 miles) longer, via Maroona and Geelong was introduced.

=== Motorail service ===
A motorail service was added to the train from November 1979. The service was withdrawn in the early 2000s when the vehicle loading ramp at the Melbourne end was removed as part of the Southern Cross station redevelopment, It was restored in February 2009, but was withdrawn again in November 2015.

=== Great Southern Rail ===
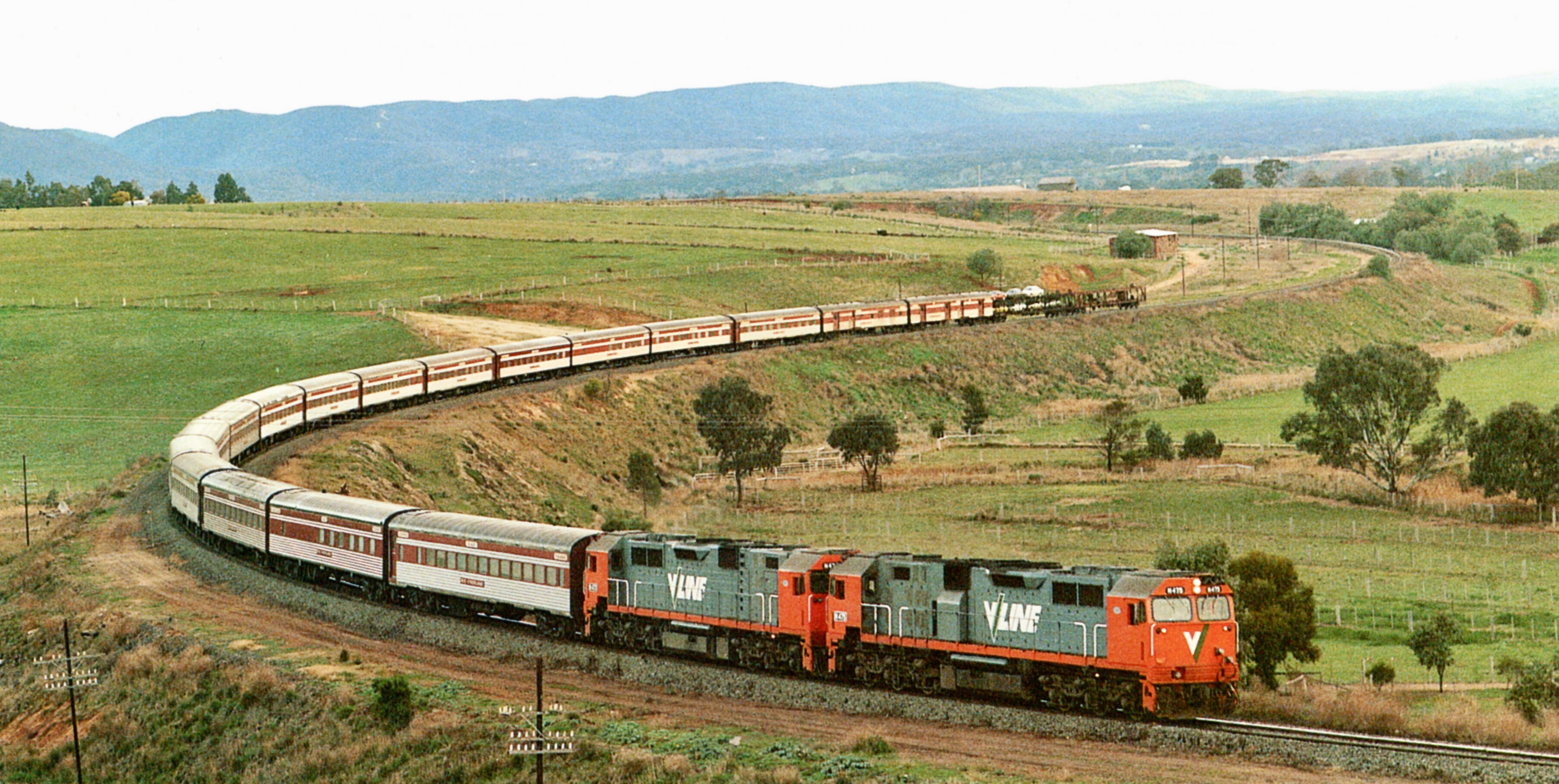
The Overland's overnight service bound for Adelaide, approximately 1995

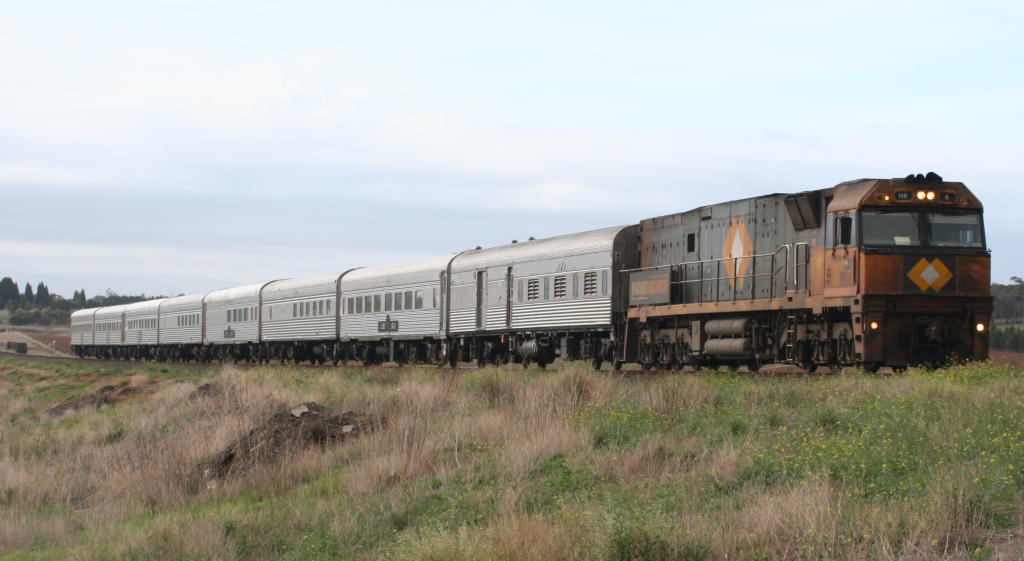
The 1999–2007 version of the train

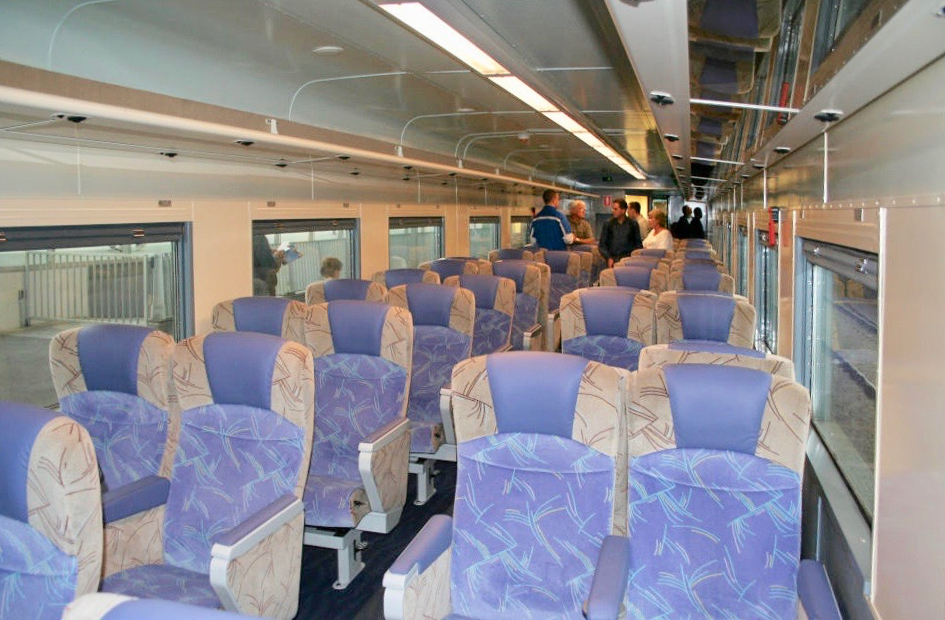
Interior of a Red Service carriage, 2007

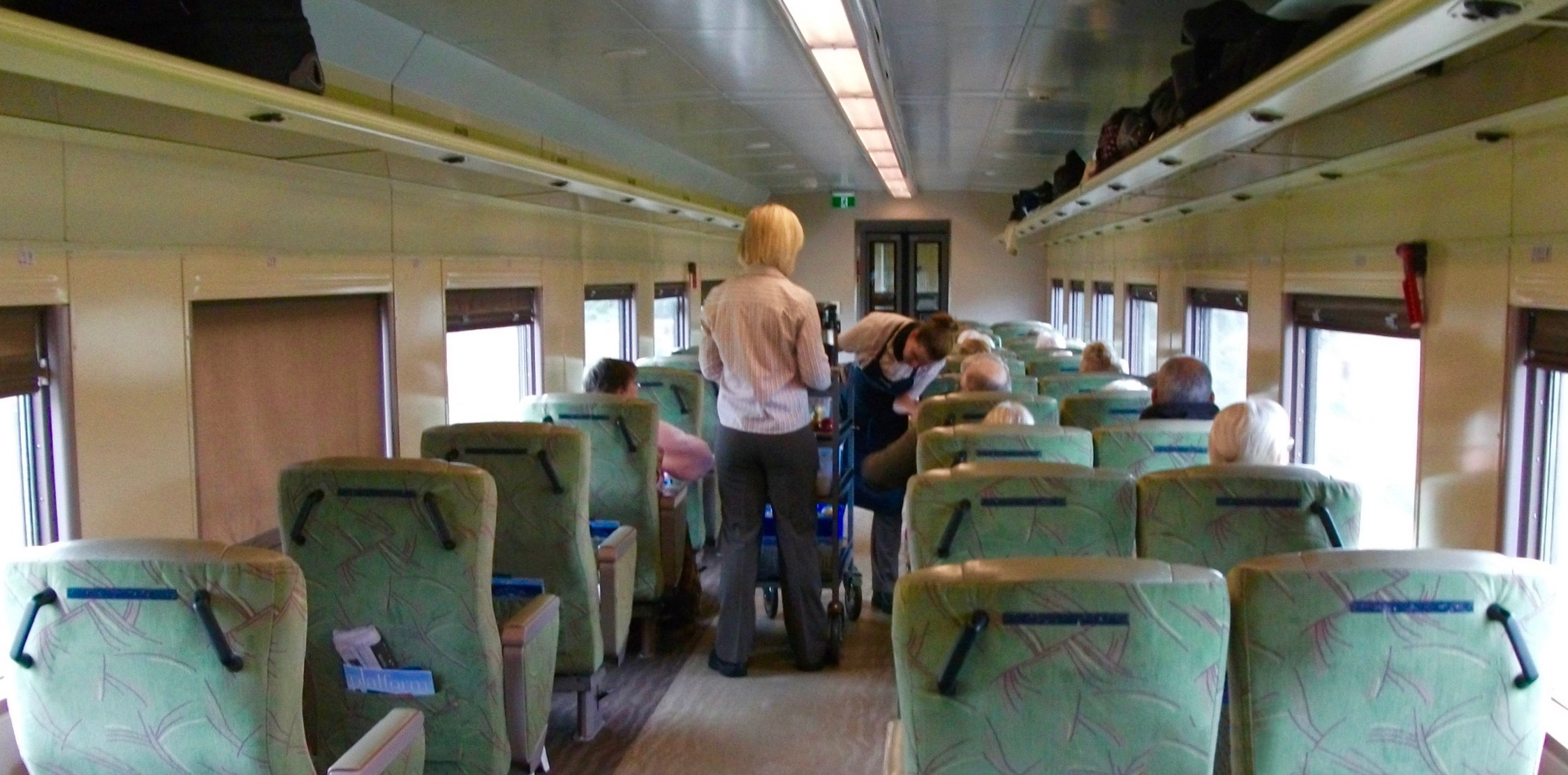
Morning tea is served in a Red Premium (first class) car, 2011

In November 1997, Australian National was sold and the passenger cars passed to Great Southern Rail Limited, which contracted National Rail to haul the services with NR class locomotives. On occasions, BL and 93 class locomotives hauled the service. In July 1998, the Wednesday and Saturday night journeys in each direction were cancelled, leaving the service operating five times per week in each direction. In May 1999, a new timetable was introduced but with previous intermediate stops omitted at Stawell, Murtoa, Nhill, Kaniva, Wolseley, Keith, Tintinara, Coonalpyn and Tailem Bend. Also in 1999, the train's maroon and silver livery was removed and replaced with a purely silver one, to match the Commonwealth Railways stainless steel carriage stock used on the Indian Pacific and The Ghan, with a new kookaburra logo. In May 2000, the service was reduced to four times weekly. However, with an accelerated journey time of 10 hours 30 minutes, the service was able to be operated by one set of passenger cars, operating to Melbourne in the day and to Adelaide overnight. Some of the largest Overland consists were run during this era; during the 2002 AFL finals, in which both the Adelaide Crows and Port Adelaide Power were competing, The Overland was built up to a record 32 carriages for the Preliminary Final round on 21 September.

In May 2007, Great Southern Rail completed a $4m interior overhaul of the passenger cars (jointly funded by the South Australian and Victorian governments) and introduced a new blue, purple and green livery applied; the service had already been re-timetabled to operate three times weekly in daylight the previous year. A new running emu logo was also introduced. From August 2008, 12 seats per train were made available to passengers within Victoria (between Southern Cross and Nhill) at V/Line fares. In October 2010, it was announced that the train would stop at Stawell. At the same time, the number of seats available on V/Line fares was increased to 64 per train. In August 2013, the three-times weekly service was reduced to twice-weekly.

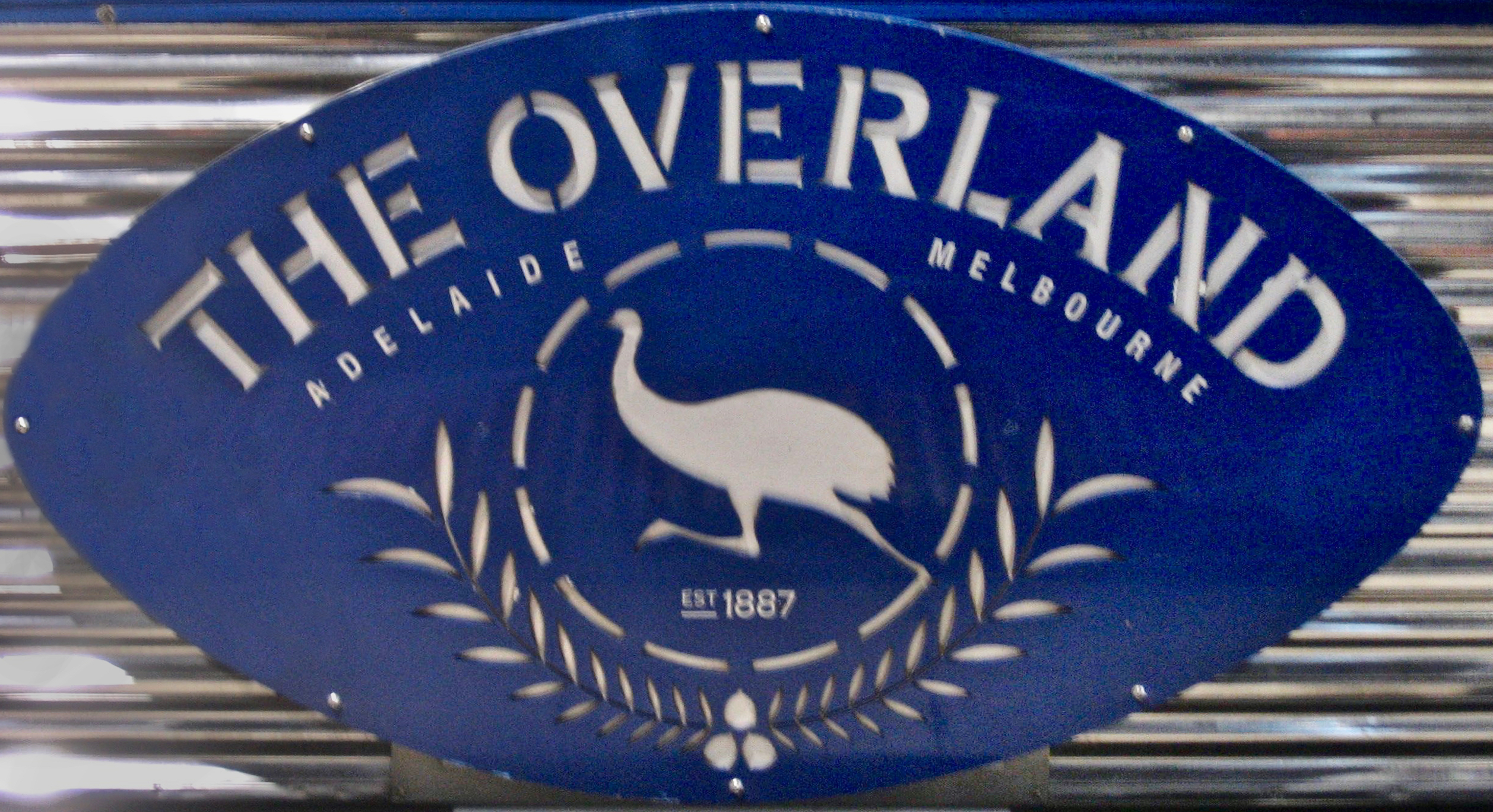
Carriage-side logo in the Journey Beyond era

From 2007, The Overland continued to operate with a $1.5 million annual subsidy from the Victorian State Government. In August 2015, concerns were raised about the future of the service when GSR announced that, because the federal government's subsidy of the fares of pensioners, veterans and seniors taking train journeys would end in July 2016, services on GSR's other trains, The Ghan and the Indian Pacific, were to be halved. Later in the month, the South Australian Government announced that it would support the service as part of a $1 million deal with the company.

=== Private equity era – "Journey Beyond" ===
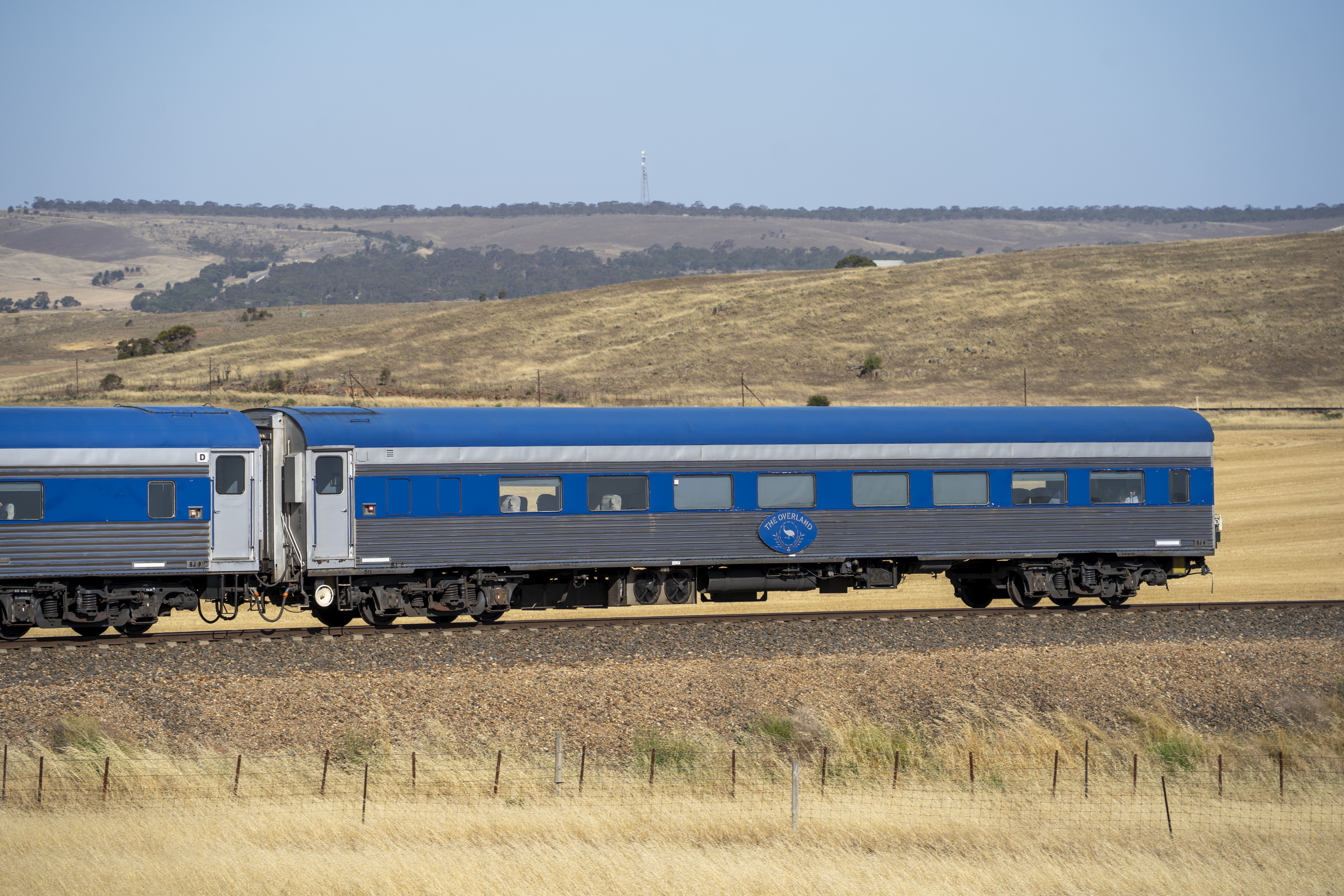
An Overland carriage at Callington, SA, in December 2025

From 2015, ownership of Great Southern Rail passed through a series of private equity funds, first to Allegro Funds in May 2015, then Quadrant Private Equity in October 2016 (at which time it was rebranded to "Journey Beyond"), (Note: As of 2020, "Journey Beyond" was a business name of Experience Australia Group Pty Ltd ABN 56 614 713 003) Hornblower Group in January 2022, and subsequently Crestview Partners in February 2024. The move to private equity ownership began a market pivot from being primarily a transport operator, to a luxury "experiential travel" operator. From July 2016, following the withdrawal of a federal subsidy, all coach-class seating was removed from The Ghan and the Indian Pacific, with these services now focusing on the premium market. The shorter travel time of The Overland was not conducive to such a conversion, so it was retained, but now conspicuously at variance with Journey Beyond's new tourism focus.

In 2018, The Overland's future was in doubt as 20 years of subsidies from the two state governments appeared likely to cease: although the Victorian Government renewed its subsidy for 15 months in August, the South Australian Government announced in November that it had decided not to renew its subsidy beyond the end of the year. In December, however, the Victorian Government announced it would fund the shortfall to allow the service to continue in 2019. The service was again threatened with withdrawal in December 2019 before a last-minute agreement for the Victorian government subsidy to continue until March 2020 was reached. In that month, the COVID-19 pandemic necessitated all Journey Beyond train services to be suspended, restarting in September 2020. In June 2020, the Victorian Government committed to a three-year funding agreement to support The Overland, providing $3.8 million per year until June 2023. After the 2022 South Australian state election, the newly elected Malinauskas government reinstated the South Australian government's subsidy, amounting to $1.4 million over four years.

== Overland exhibits in museums ==
The National Railway Museum at Port Adelaide, South Australia, has several exhibits related to the train:

- 1923-vintage wooden sitting car, 42BE
- 1949-built sleeping car, Allambi, the first of the post-war steel cars built at Islington Railway Workshops
- 12-wheel brakevan, 276, one of a type used on second divisions of the express during the Second World War
- steam locomotive 504, named Tom Barr Smith
- diesel-electric locomotive 900, named Lady Norrie
- diesel-electric locomotive 930.

The Overland Museum, in Kaniva, on the Western Highway, Victoria, is dedicated exclusively to The Overland; its centrepieces are preserved sleeping cars Nomuldi and Pekina.
