= Inverleigh railway station =

Railway station in Victoria, Australia

Inverleigh
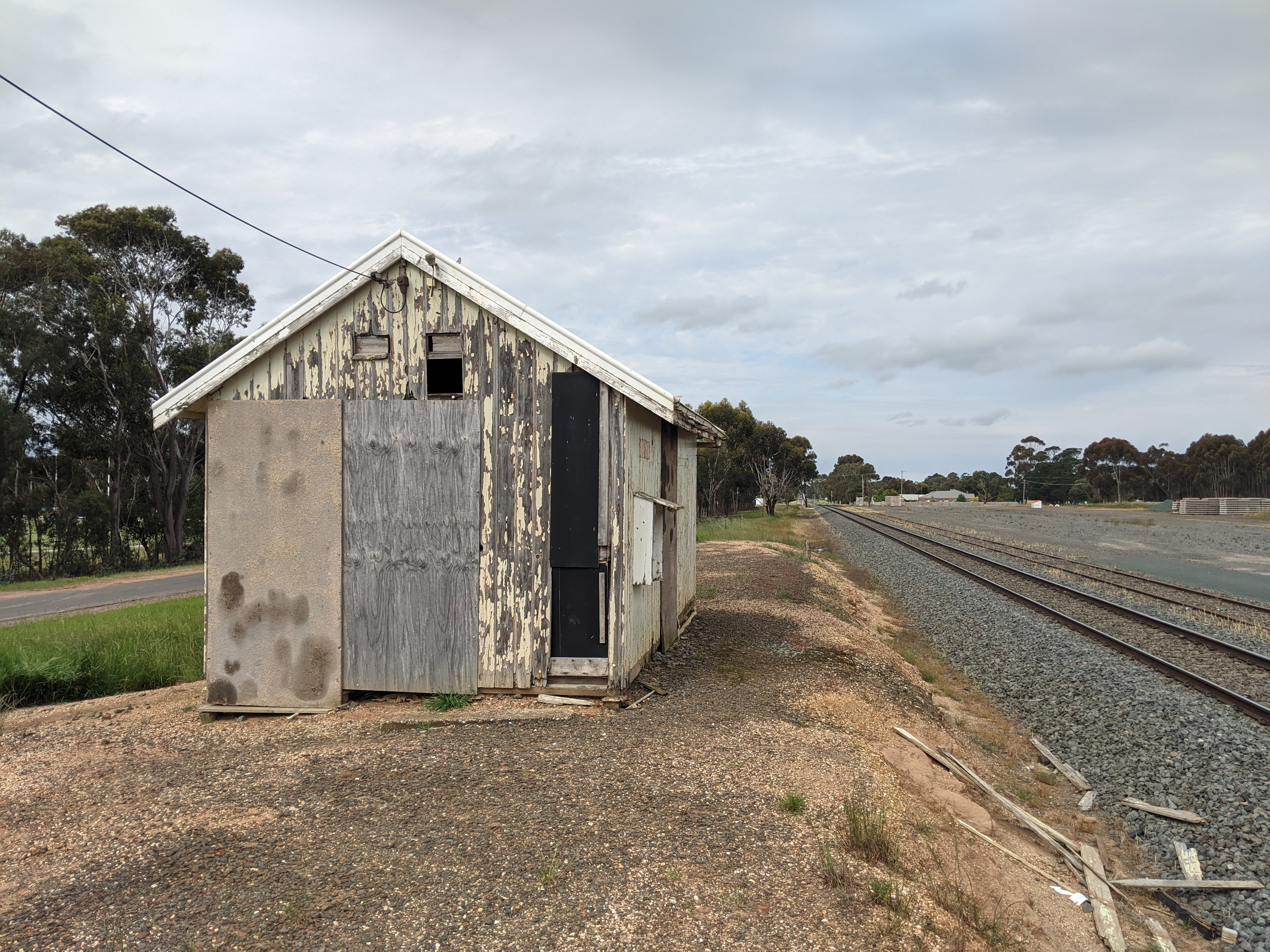
- Overview of the crossing loop and remains of the station

General information
- Location: 89 Mercer Street, Inverleigh, Victoria 3321; Golden Plains Shire; Australia
- Coordinates: 38°06′21″S 144°02′52″E
- System: Journey Beyond inter-city rail station
- Owner: VicTrack
- Operator: Journey Beyond
- Lines: Great Southern (Western standard gauge)
- Distance: 100.65 kilometres from Southern Cross
- Platforms: 1
- Tracks: 2

Construction
- Structure type: Ground

Other information
- Station code: IUH
- Fare zone: Myki not available. Paper ticket only.

History
- Opened: 8 August 1913
- Closed: 4 October 1981
- Rebuilt: 6 December 2019

Services
Preceding station	Journey Beyond	Following station
Adelaide Terminus	Great Southern	Broadmeadows One-way operation
The Overland does not stop here
Location
- Location within Victoria

Inverleigh railway station is a stopping place for Journey Beyond's Great Southern train service and is located on the Western standard gauge line. The station is a drop off point for the Great Southern service located in the town of Inverleigh.

== History ==
Inverleigh station opened on 3 August 1913 along with the rest of the Gheringhap-Maroona Line. The station was closed on 4 October 1981 as part of the New Deal for Country Passengers which saw many passenger services across Victoria cut and closed. Today, there is little remaining of the station platform with it being removed as part of the conversion of the line from broad to standard gauge in 1995.
