= Commonwealth Railways stainless steel carriage stock =

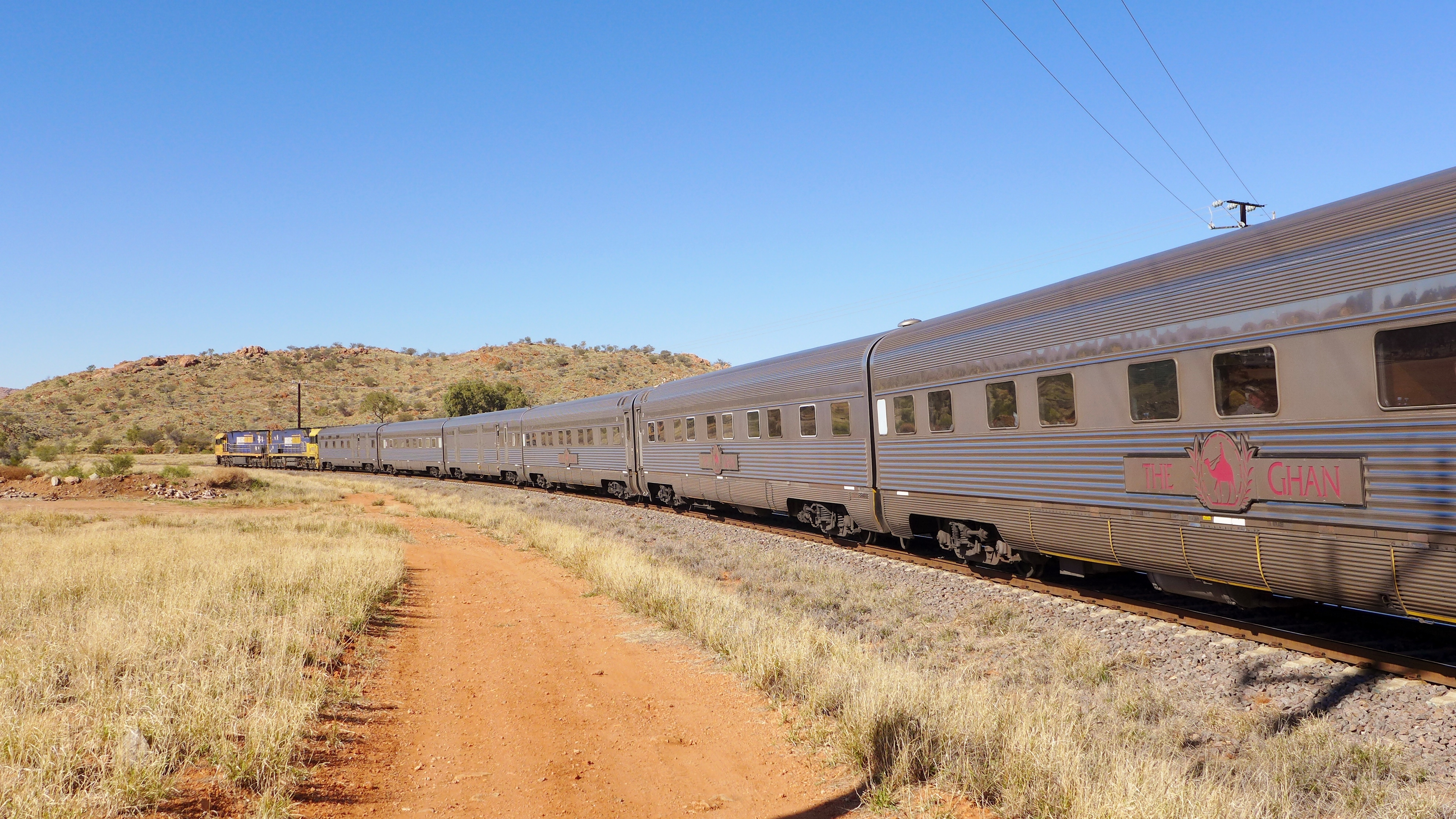
- The Ghan made up of the carriages approaching Alice Springs in July 2015
- Manufacturer: Commonwealth Engineering
- Entered service: 1966 - present
- Number built: 124
- Number in service: 114
- Number retired: 2
- Number preserved: 3
- Number scrapped: 5

The Commonwealth Railways stainless steel carriage stock is a type of carriage stock built for various special passenger services across Australia.

== History ==
In July 1965, Commonwealth Railways placed an order with Commonwealth Engineering, Granville for eight 22.92-metre (75 ft 2 in) air-conditioned stainless steel sleeping carriages and one dining carriage for use on the Trans Australian. The first was delivered in July 1966.

The carriages were built to a slightly narrower loading gauge than existing stock to allow their operation on other systems as a precursor to the commencement of transcontinental services. In May 1967, Commonwealth Railways placed an order for a further 59 carriages in various configurations for use on the Indian Pacific. Further orders saw the fleet total 124.

Of these, 60 were jointly owned by the New South Wales Government Railways, Commonwealth Railways and the Western Australian Government Railways for the Indian Pacific and the balance by the Commonwealth Railways for the Trans-Australian. In practice, they were used interchangeably.

Since 1980, the stock has been used on The Ghan from Adelaide to Alice Springs. From November 1983 until November 1987, they were used on The Alice from Sydney to Alice Springs. More recently they have been used on The Overland from Adelaide to Melbourne and The Southern Spirit.

In July 1975, all were included in the transfer of Commonwealth Railways to Australian National and in October 1997 to Great Southern Rail.

== Construction ==
Between 1966 and 1975, the following carriages were built by Commonwealth Engineering at Granville for the Indian Pacific, Trans Australian and Ghan services:

- 13x ARJ First Class Roomette sleeping cars (20 berths in 20 compartments) numbered 240 to 245, 272 to 273 and 282 to 286.
- 23x ARL First Class Twinette sleeping cars (18 berths in 9 compartments + conductor's compartment) numbered 246 to 250, 261 to 263, 289 to 293, 308 to 310 and 320 to 326.
- 6x ARM First Class Deluxe Twinette sleeping cars numbered 251 to 254 and 287 to 288.
- 22x BRJ Second Class Twin berth sleeping cars (36 berths in 18 compartments) numbered 212 to 223, 267 to 271 and 299 to 303.
- 8x BRG Second Class Twin berth sleeping cars (36 berths in 18 compartments) numbered 168 to 175.
- 7x AFC First Class Lounge cars numbered 236 to 239 and 305 to 307.
- 11x DF First Class Dining cars (48 seats) numbered 230 to 235, 264, 294 to 295, 304 and 327.
- 8x CDF Second Class Club/Dining cars numbered 224 to 229 and 265 to 266.
- 1x DE Dining car (48 seats) numbered 176.
- 7x ER Dormitory staff cars numbered 206 to 211 and 313.
- 9x HGM Power and guards vans numbered 202 to 205, 296 to 298, 316 and 317.
- 9x HM Baggage and mail vans numbered 255 to 259, 311 to 312 and 318 to 319.
- 1x SSA Governor General's special car numbered 260.

== Fleet details ==
=== Individual carriage details ===
| Key: | In Service | Withdrawn | Preserved | Scrapped | Unknown |

| Code | Number | Entered service | Withdrawn | Current owner | Current location | Notes |
|---|---|---|---|---|---|---|
| BRG | 168 | 1966-11-08 | N/A | Journey Beyond Rail Expeditions | Keswick Terminal | Interior stripped In February 2006 for conversion to a deluxe sleeping car. It was sent to South Dynon on 16 August 2006. In August 2008, the carriage reentered service as a Platinum Service deluxe sleeping car. |
| BRG | 969 (originally 169) | 1966-11-08 | N/A | Journey Beyond Rail Expeditions | Keswick Terminal | Renumbered 969 in 1977 for Joint Stock accounting purposes. |
| BRG | 170 | 1966-11-16 | N/A | Journey Beyond Rail Expeditions | Keswick Terminal | Interior stripped In February 2006 for conversion to a deluxe sleeping car. It was sent to South Dynon on 16 August 2006. In August 2008, the carriage reentered service as a Platinum Service deluxe sleeping car. |
| BRG | 171 | 1966-11-16 | N/A | Journey Beyond Rail Expeditions | Keswick Terminal | In 1989, the Ghan sunset-coloured stripes were applied to the exterior. Interior stripped In February 2006 for conversion to a deluxe sleeping car. It was sent to South Dynon on 16 August 2006. In August 2008, the carriage reentered service as a Platinum Service deluxe sleeping car. |
| BRG | 972 (originally 172) | 1966-11-23 | N/A | Journey Beyond Rail Expeditions | Keswick Terminal | Renumbered 972 in 1977 for Joint Stock accounting purposes. Interior stripped In February 2006 for conversion to a deluxe sleeping car. It was sent to South Dynon on 16 August 2006. In August 2008, the carriage reentered service as a Platinum Service deluxe sleeping car. |
| BRG | 173 | 1966-11-23 | N/A | Journey Beyond Rail Expeditions | Keswick Terminal | In 1989, the Ghan sunset-coloured stripes were applied to the exterior. Interior stripped In February 2006 for conversion to a deluxe sleeping car. It was sent to South Dynon on 16 August 2006. In August 2008, the carriage reentered service as a Platinum Service deluxe sleeping car. |
| BRG | 974 (originally 174) | 1966-11-30 | N/A | Journey Beyond Rail Expeditions | Keswick Terminal | Renumbered 974 in 1977 for Joint Stock accounting purposes. Interior stripped In February 2006 for conversion to a deluxe sleeping car. It was sent to South Dynon on 16 August 2006. In August 2008, the carriage reentered service as a Platinum Service deluxe sleeping car. |
| BRG | 175 | 1966-11-11 | N/A | Journey Beyond Rail Expeditions | Keswick Terminal | Interior stripped In February 2006 for conversion to a deluxe sleeping car. It was sent to South Dynon on 16 August 2006. In August 2008, the carriage reentered service as a Platinum Service deluxe sleeping car. |
| DE | 176 | 1966-11-23 | Unknown | Steve Moritz | Tailem Bend, South Australia | In 1980, the carriage was transferred to Broad gauge from Standard Gauge for use on an Australian National inspection tour of the Murray Lands lines. After the privatisation of Australian National, the carriage was sold to Australian Rail Track Corporation in 1998. The carriage was sold at an auction in March 2011 and DE 176 was purchased by Steve Moritz, who moved the carriage to Tailem Bend in September 2012. |
| HGM | 902 (originally 202) | 1969-5-28 | N/A | Journey Beyond Rail Expeditions | Keswick Terminal | Renumbered 902 in 1974 for Joint Stock accounting purposes. |
| HGM | 903 (originally 203) | 1969-2-21 | N/A | Journey Beyond Rail Expeditions | Keswick Terminal | Renumbered 903 in 1974 for Joint Stock accounting purposes. This carriage featured on the first Ghan to Darwin on 1 February 2004. |
| HGM | 904 (originally 204) | 1969-5-1 | N/A | Journey Beyond Rail Expeditions | Keswick Terminal | Renumbered 904 in 1974 for Joint Stock accounting purposes. |
| HGM | 205 | 1969-3-7 | 1999-12-2 | *scrapped* | | HGM205 was leased to Victorian Railways as a replacement power carriage for PHN2370 which was destroyed in the Violet Town rail accident. The carriage then entered service with Commonwealth Railways in December 1970 when replacement power carriage PHN2381 was built. The carriage was accident-damaged after Glenbrook rail accident and has since been scrapped. |
| ER | 906 (originally 206) | 1969-5-1 | N/A | Journey Beyond Rail Expeditions | Keswick Terminal | Renumbered 906 in 1977 for Joint Stock accounting purposes. Internally refurbished in 1994 for use on the Indian Pacific. |
| ER | 207 | 1969-5-1 | N/A | Journey Beyond Rail Expeditions | Keswick Terminal | In 1989, the Ghan sunset-coloured stripes were applied to the exterior. |
| RZBY (originally ER) | 208 | 1969-6-19 (as a passenger car), 1997 (as a crew car) | 1997 (as a passenger car) N/A (as a crew car) | Pacific National | | In 1989, the Ghan sunset-coloured stripes were applied to the exterior. In 1997, it was withdrawn from passenger service and sold to National Rail and converted to a crew car, recoded RZBY. |
| ER | 909 (originally 209) | 1969-6-4 | N/A | Journey Beyond Rail Expeditions | Keswick Terminal | Renumbered 909 in 1974 for Joint Stock accounting purposes. |
| RZBY (originally ER) | 910 (originally 210) | 1969-5-15 (as a passenger car), 1997 (as a crew car) | 1997 (as a passenger car) N/A (as a crew car) | Pacific National | | Renumbered 910 in 1974 for Joint Stock accounting purposes. In 1997, it was withdrawn from passenger service and sold to National Rail and converted to a crew car, recoded RZBY. |
| RZBY (originally ER) | 911 (originally 211) | 1969-6-2 (as a passenger car), 1997 (as a crew car) | 1997 (as a passenger car) N/A (as a crew car) | Pacific National | | Renumbered 911 in 1974 for Joint Stock accounting purposes. In 1997, it was withdrawn from passenger service and sold to National Rail and converted to a crew car, recoded RZBY. |
| BRJ | 912 (originally 212) | 1968-7-9 | N/A | Journey Beyond Rail Expeditions | Keswick Terminal | May have initially been coded BRH212 by mistake, but the mistake was corrected before entering service. Renumbered 912 in 1974 for Joint Stock accounting purposes. In November 1987, the carriage was trialled with sunset-coloured stripes applied to the exterior of one side for the Ghan. Internally refurbished in 1994 for use on the Indian Pacific. |
| AFC (originally BRJ) | 213 | 1968-6-28 | N/A | Journey Beyond Rail Expeditions | Keswick Terminal | In October 1994, the carriage was converted from a BRJ 2nd class sleeping car to an AFC 1st class lounge car. After the conversion, AFC213 was named the Blue Mountains Lounge. In 2008, the carriage was then refurbished as the Ernest Giles Outback Explorer Lounge. |
| BRJ | 914 (originally 214) | 1968-7-16 | 1998-6-12 | Journey Beyond Rail Expeditions | Keswick Terminal | Renumbered 914 in 1975 for Joint Stock accounting purposes. In June 1998, this carriage was burnt out and has not been repaired. |
| BRJ | 915 (originally 215) | 1968-8-14 | N/A | Journey Beyond Rail Expeditions | Keswick Terminal | Renumbered 915 in 1974 for Joint Stock accounting purposes. In 1988, this carriage was used on the Brisbane Expo Express. Internally refurbished in 1995 for use on the Indian Pacific. This carriage featured on the first Ghan to Darwin on 1 February 2004. |
| BRJ | 916 (originally 216) | 1968-7-24 | N/A | Journey Beyond Rail Expeditions | Keswick Terminal | Renumbered 916 in 1974 for Joint Stock accounting purposes. |
| BRG (originally BRJ) | 917 (originally 217) | 1968-8-28 | N/A | Journey Beyond Rail Expeditions | Keswick Terminal | Renumbered 915 in 1974 for Joint Stock accounting purposes. Rebuilt in 2019 as a Platinum Service deluxe sleeping car |
| BRJ | 918 (originally 218) | 1968-8-14 | N/A | Journey Beyond Rail Expeditions | Keswick Terminal | Renumbered 918 in 1974 for Joint Stock accounting purposes. Internally refurbished in 1995 for use on the Indian Pacific. |
| BRJ | 919 (originally 219) | 1968-8-20 | N/A | Journey Beyond Rail Expeditions | Keswick Terminal | Renumbered 919 in 1974 for Joint Stock accounting purposes. Internally refurbished in 1995 for use on the Indian Pacific. The carriage is now a crew car, with a small kitchen dining area added to replace some of the sleeping compartments. |
| ECA (originally BRJ) | 220 | 1969-2-21 | 1997 | *scrapped* | | In 1989, the carriage was converted into an ECA crew car for use by Australian National. The carriage was destroyed in an accident at Mt Christie. |
| BRG (originally BRJ) | 221 | 1969-3-28 | N/A | Journey Beyond Rail Expeditions | Keswick Terminal | BRJ221 was leased to Victorian Railways as a replacement carriage for a LAN roomette sleeping carriage that was destroyed in the Violet Town rail accident. It entered service on the Commonwealth Railways on 28 March 1969. Rebuilt in 2019 as a Platinum Service deluxe sleeping car |
| AEC (originally BRJ) | 222 | 1969-3-21 | N/A | Journey Beyond Rail Expeditions | Keswick Terminal | BRJ222 was leased to Victorian Railways as a replacement carriage for a LAN roomette sleeping carriage that was destroyed in the Violet Town rail accident. It entered service on the Commonwealth Railways on 28 March 1969. In November 1986, the carriage was converted into a First Class Entertainment Car & was coded AEC. In 1989, the Ghan sunset-coloured stripes were applied to the exterior. Rebuilt in 2010 as the Sir John and Alexander Forrest Outback Explorer lounge car. |
| ACC (originally BRJ) | 223 | 1969-3-21 | N/A | Journey Beyond Rail Expeditions | Keswick Terminal | BRJ223 was leased to Victorian Railways as a replacement carriage for a LAN roomette sleeping carriage that was destroyed in the Violet Town rail accident. It entered service on the Commonwealth Railways on 28 March 1969. In November 1986, the carriage was converted into a First Class Conference Car that was coded ACC. In July 2002, the carriage interior was altered so it can be used as a Gold Kangaroo class lounge car called the Oodnadatta Lounge. This carriage featured on the first Ghan to Darwin on 1 February 2004. Around 2008, the carriage was converted to the Len Beadell Outback Explorer lounge car. |
| CDF | 924 (originally 224) | 1969-6-24 | N/A | Journey Beyond Rail Expeditions | Keswick Terminal | Renumbered 924 in 1974 for Joint Stock accounting purposes. In August 1993, the carriage was converted to a buffet/dining car with similar seating to the first class dining cars called "Matilda's Restaurant". This carriage featured on the first Ghan to Darwin on 1 February 2004. |
| CDF | 225 | 1969-7-11 | N/A | Journey Beyond Rail Expeditions | Keswick Terminal | In July 1992, the carriage was converted to a buffet/dining car with similar seating to the first class dining cars called "Matilda's Restaurant". |
| DF (originally CDF) | 226 | 1969-7-17 | N/A | Journey Beyond Rail Expeditions | Keswick Terminal | Rebuilt in 2019 as a DF first class dining car. |
| AFC (originally CDF) | 227 | 1969-7-24 | N/A | Journey Beyond Rail Expeditions | Keswick Terminal | In 1989, the Ghan sunset-coloured stripes were applied to the exterior. In 1990, the carriage was refurbished as the "Marree Refreshment Car", with a very similar interior to the original CDF carriages, except for the fact that Dreamtime art was installed inside. The carriage wasn't used on the Ghan since September 1992, when the Ghan sunset-coloured stripes were removed from the carriage. Rebuilt in 2019 as an AFC first class lounge car. |
| CDF | 928 (originally 228) | 1969-8-15 | N/A | Journey Beyond Rail Expeditions | Keswick Terminal | Renumbered 928 in 1974 for Joint Stock accounting purposes. In May 1992, the carriage was converted to a buffet/dining car with similar seating to the first class dining cars called "Matilda's Restaurant". However, unlike other Matilda's Restaurant dining cars, this one was specifically designed for The Ghan with a new Ghan board and sunset-coloured stripes applied to the exterior. This carriage featured on the first Ghan to Darwin on 1 February 2004. |
| CDF | 929 (originally 229) | 1969-9-18 | N/A | Journey Beyond Rail Expeditions | Keswick Terminal | Renumbered 929 in 1974 for Joint Stock accounting purposes. In August 1993, the carriage was converted to a buffet/dining car with similar seating to the first class dining cars called "Matilda's Restaurant". |
| DF | 930 (originally 230) | 1968-3-29 | N/A | Journey Beyond Rail Expeditions | Keswick Terminal | Renumbered 930 in 1974 for Joint Stock accounting purposes. |
| DF | 231 | 1968-4-4 | N/A | Journey Beyond Rail Expeditions | Keswick Terminal | In 1989, the Ghan sunset-coloured stripes were applied to the exterior. Furthermore, the carriage was also internally refurbished as the Stuart Restaurant. This carriage featured on the first Ghan to Darwin on 1 February 2004. In August 2009, the carriage was converted to a Queen Adelaide Restaurant. |
| DF | 232 | 1969-2-8 | N/A | Journey Beyond Rail Expeditions | Keswick Terminal | DF232 was leased to Victorian Railways as a replacement carriage for RMS2358 that was partially damaged as a result of the Violet Town rail accident. It entered service on the Commonwealth Railways on 17 October 1969 after RMS2358 was repaired. Rebuilt in 1994 as a Queen Adelaide Restaurant. This carriage featured on the first Ghan to Darwin on 1 February 2004. |
| DF | 233 | 1968-11-29 | N/A | Journey Beyond Rail Expeditions | Keswick Terminal | Rebuilt in 1993 as a Queen Adelaide Restaurant. This carriage featured on the first Ghan to Darwin on 1 February 2004. |
| DF | 934 (originally 234) | 1968-5-3 | N/A | Journey Beyond Rail Expeditions | Keswick Terminal | Renumbered 934 in 1974 for Joint Stock accounting purposes. |
| DF | 935 (originally 235) | 1968-7-29 | 1995-12-x | 707 Operations | Newport Workshops | Renumbered 935 in 1974 for Joint Stock accounting purposes. In 1995, this carriage was withdrawn from use and was recorded to be scrapped. However, like many other carriages, DF935 was sold to International Development Services. In 1998, the carriage was sold to Mr M.Menzies of Victoria for a company called Rail Experience. As of March 2012, DF935 belongs to 707 Operations as a dining and kitchen carriage, and is currently undergoing overhaul. |
| AFC | 936 (originally 236) | 1969-2-22 | N/A | Journey Beyond Rail Expeditions | Keswick Terminal | Renumbered 936 in 1974 for Joint Stock accounting purposes. In 1995, the carriage was converted from a First Class lounge car to a Holiday (Second class) Lounge Car. This carriage featured on the first Ghan to Darwin on 1 February 2004. In 2010, the carriage was then rebuilt with a new internal layout and refurbished as the Red Gum Lounge. The Red Gum lounge was withdrawn on 1 April 2013, after the BRJ (Red Class) sleeping cars were also withdrawn. Refurbished in 2016 as the Platinum Club car, featuring a bar as well as a lounge that can be converted into a dining area and back. This carriage seats 30 in the dining configuration and 20 in a lounge configuration in an Art-Deco style. |
| AFC | 937 (originally 237) | 1969-2-22 | N/A | Journey Beyond Rail Expeditions | Keswick Terminal | Renumbered 937 in 1974 for Joint Stock accounting purposes. In 1995, the carriage was rebuilt as the Hannans Bar Lounge with a smoking compartment when the Indian Pacific was undergoing an upgrade. This carriage featured on the first Ghan to Darwin on 1 February 2004. In 2008, the carriage was then refurbished as the Edward John Eyre Outback Explorer Lounge car. |
| AFC | 938 (originally 238) | 1969-2-8 | N/A | Journey Beyond Rail Expeditions | Keswick Terminal | AFC238 was leased to Victorian Railways as a replacement carriage for BCS2355 that was destroyed as a result of the Violet Town rail accident. It entered service on the Commonwealth Railways on 27 February 1970 after BCS2379 was built. Renumbered 938 in 1974 for Joint Stock accounting purposes. In 1995, the carriage was converted from a First Class lounge car to a Holiday (Second class) Lounge Car. This carriage featured on the first Ghan to Darwin on 1 February 2004. In 2010, the carriage was then rebuilt with a new internal layout and refurbished as the Red Gum Lounge. The Red Gum lounge was withdrawn on 1 April 2013, after the BRJ (Red Class) sleeping cars were also withdrawn. Refurbished in 2016 as the Platinum Club car, featuring a bar as well as a lounge that can be converted into a dining area and back. This carriage seats 30 in the dining configuration and 20 in a lounge configuration in an Art-Deco style. |
| AFC | 939 (originally 239) | 1969-3-14 | N/A | Journey Beyond Rail Expeditions | Keswick Terminal | Renumbered 939 in 1974 for Joint Stock accounting purposes. In 1995, the carriage was converted from a First Class lounge car to a Holiday (Second class) Lounge Car. In 2010, the carriage was then rebuilt with a new internal layout and refurbished as the Red Gum Lounge. The Red Gum lounge was withdrawn on 1 April 2013, after the BRJ (Red Class) sleeping cars were also withdrawn. Refurbished in 2016 as the Platinum Club car, featuring a bar as well as a lounge that can be converted into a dining area and back. This carriage seats 30 in the dining configuration and 20 in a lounge configuration in an Art-Deco style. |
| RZAY (originally ARJ) | 940 (originally 240) | 1968-12-6 (as a passenger car), 1997 (as a crew car) | 1997 (as a passenger car) N/A (as a crew car) | Pacific National | | Renumbered 939 in 1974 for Joint Stock accounting purposes. In 1997, it was withdrawn from passenger service and sold to National Rail and converted to a crew car, recoded RZAY. |
| ARJ | 941 (originally 241) | 1968-11-22 | N/A | Journey Beyond Rail Expeditions | Keswick Terminal | Renumbered 939 in 1974 for Joint Stock accounting purposes. In April 1995, the carriage was internally refurbished as the Mt Christie Car for the Indian Pacific and has a Waratah theme on the interior. |
| ARJ | 242 | 1969-2-7 | N/A | Journey Beyond Rail Expeditions | Keswick Terminal | ARJ242 was leased to Victorian Railways as a replacement carriage for a LAN carriage that was destroyed as a result of the Violet Town rail accident. After replacement LAN carriages were built, the carriage was returned to Commonwealth Railways. In 1989, the Ghan sunset-coloured stripes were applied to the exterior. In 1991, the carriage was again refurbished for the Ghan, but this time internally. ARJ242 was named the Brachina Car after refurbishment. |
| ARJ | 243 | 1969-2-7 | N/A | Journey Beyond Rail Expeditions | Keswick Terminal | ARJ243 was leased to Victorian Railways as a replacement carriage for a LAN carriage that was destroyed as a result of the Violet Town rail accident. After replacement LAN carriages were built, the carriage was returned to Commonwealth Railways. In 1995, ARJ243 was refurbished for the Indian Pacific and the interior theme was the Sturt's Desert Pea. |
| RZAY | 944 (originally 244) | 1969-2-7 (as a passenger car), 1997 (as a crew car) | 1997 (as a passenger car) N/A (as a crew car) | Pacific National | | ARJ244 was leased to Victorian Railways as a replacement carriage for a LAN carriage that was destroyed as a result of the Violet Town rail accident. After replacement LAN carriages were built, the carriage was returned to Commonwealth Railways. Renumbered 944 in 1974 for Joint Stock accounting purposes. In 1997, it was withdrawn from passenger service and sold to National Rail and converted to a crew car, recoded RZAY. |
| ARJ | 945 (originally 245) | 1969-2-21 | N/A | Journey Beyond Rail Expeditions | Keswick Terminal | Renumbered 945 in 1974 for Joint Stock accounting purposes. In 1995, ARJ945 was refurbished for the Indian Pacific and the interior theme was the Sturt's Desert Pea. |
| ARL | 246 | 1969-2-07 | N/A | Journey Beyond Rail Expeditions | Keswick Terminal | ARL246 was leased to Victorian Railways as a replacement carriage for a NAM carriage that was destroyed as a result of the Violet Town rail accident. After replacement NAM carriages were built, the carriage was returned to Commonwealth Railways. In 1989, the Ghan sunset-coloured stripes were applied to the exterior and the carriage was internally refurbished as the Tarcoola Car after refurbishment. This carriage featured on the first Ghan to Darwin on 1 February 2004. |
| ARM (originally ARL) | 947 (originally 247) | 1968-9-24 | N/A | Journey Beyond Rail Expeditions | Keswick Terminal | Renumbered 947 in 1974 for Joint Stock accounting purposes. In 1995, the train was internally refurbished with a Wooden interior. In September 2002, two of the centre compartments (9/10 and 11/12) were converted into one single luxury compartment and the carriage was recoded ARM. This carriage featured on the first Ghan to Darwin on 1 February 2004. |
| ARL | 248 | 1969-2-07 | N/A | Journey Beyond Rail Expeditions | Keswick Terminal | ARL248 was leased to Victorian Railways as a replacement carriage for a NAM carriage that was destroyed as a result of the Violet Town rail accident. After replacement NAM carriages were built, the carriage was returned to Commonwealth Railways. In 1989, the Ghan sunset-coloured stripes were applied to the exterior and the carriage was internally refurbished as the Oodnadatta Car after refurbishment. This carriage featured on the first Ghan to Darwin on 1 February 2004. |
| ARL | 249 | 1968-9-25 | N/A | Journey Beyond Rail Expeditions | Keswick Terminal | ARL249 was leased to Victorian Railways as a replacement carriage for a NAM carriage that was destroyed as a result of the Violet Town rail accident. After replacement NAM carriages were built, the carriage was returned to Commonwealth Railways. In July 1994, ARL949 was refurbished for the Indian Pacific and the interior theme was the Ocean. This carriage featured on the first Ghan to Darwin on 1 February 2004. |
| ARL | 250 | 1969-10-11 | N/A | Journey Beyond Rail Expeditions | Keswick Terminal | In 1989, the Ghan sunset-coloured stripes were applied to the exterior and the carriage was internally refurbished as the Kulgera Car after refurbishment. This carriage featured on the first Ghan to Darwin on 1 February 2004. |
| ARM | 951 (originally 251) | 1969-2-08 | N/A | Journey Beyond Rail Expeditions | Keswick Terminal | ARM951 was leased to Victorian Railways as a replacement carriage for a NAM carriage that was destroyed as a result of the Violet Town rail accident. After replacement NAM carriages were built, the carriage was returned to Commonwealth Railways. Renumbered 951 in 1974 for Joint Stock accounting purposes. In August 1994, ARM951 was refurbished for the Indian Pacific and the interior theme was the Ocean. |
| ARM | 952 (originally 252) | 1969-2-08 | N/A | Journey Beyond Rail Expeditions | Keswick Terminal | ARM952 was leased to Victorian Railways as a replacement carriage for a NAM carriage that was destroyed as a result of the Violet Town rail accident. After replacement NAM carriages were built, the carriage was returned to Commonwealth Railways. Renumbered 952 in 1974 for Joint Stock accounting purposes. In 1988, this carriage was used on the Brisbane Expo express. In July 1994, ARM951 was refurbished for the Indian Pacific and the interior theme was the Ocean. In January 2002, the interior was refurbished for the second time. |
| ARM | 953 (originally 253) | 1969-1-16 | N/A | Journey Beyond Rail Expeditions | Keswick Terminal | Renumbered 947 in 1974 for Joint Stock accounting purposes. In July 1994, ARM951 was refurbished for the Indian Pacific and the interior theme was the Ocean. This carriage featured on the first Ghan to Darwin on 1 February 2004. |
| ARM | 954 (originally 254) | 1969-2-08 | 1998-6-12 | *scrapped* | | Renumbered 954 in 1974 for Joint Stock accounting purposes. In 1992, the carriage was externally refurbished, fitted with Indian Pacific nameboards. On 12 June 1998, the carriage was destroyed in a fire whilst being stored at Keswick. |
| HM | 255 | 1969-5-16 | N/A | Journey Beyond Rail Expeditions | Keswick Terminal | In December 1995, the carriage was fitted with a smoking compartment. |
| HM | 256 | 1969-6-11 | N/A | Journey Beyond Rail Expeditions | Keswick Terminal | In February 1996, the carriage was fitted with a smoking compartment. |
| HM | 957 (originally 257) | 1969-6-12 | N/A | Journey Beyond Rail Expeditions | Keswick Terminal | Renumbered 957 in 1974 for Joint Stock accounting purposes. In February 1996, the carriage was fitted with a smoking compartment. |
| HM | 958 (originally 258) | 1969-6-17 | N/A | Journey Beyond Rail Expeditions | Keswick Terminal | Renumbered 958 in 1974 for Joint Stock accounting purposes. In December 1995, the carriage was fitted with a smoking compartment. In 2000, the carriage was renamed Chalaki after the former Overland sleeping car for use as the Overland's baggage car. |
| HM | 959 (originally 259) | 1969-7-9 | N/A | Journey Beyond Rail Expeditions | Keswick Terminal | Renumbered 959 in 1974 for Joint Stock accounting purposes. In 1996, the carriage was fitted with a smoking compartment. |
| SSA | 260 | 1969-3-3 | N/A | Journey Beyond Rail Expeditions | Keswick Terminal | On 23 February 1970, SSA260 was used on the inaugural Indian Pacific train so that the Governor General at the time - Paul Hasluck. In 1982, the carriage's interior was redecorated, with new carpets, curtains and upholstery. In 1992, the carriage was converted to the Chairmans Car from the Governor General's Car due to the refurbishment of the original Governor General's Car SSAF27, which was wooden. This carriage featured on the first Ghan to Darwin on 1 February 2004. In 2019, the carriage was modified into a 4-berth platinum sleeping car with a lounge area, whilst retaining the original code and number (SSA260). |
| ARL | 961 | 1970-2-5 | N/A | Journey Beyond Rail Expeditions | Keswick Terminal | Renumbered 961 in 1974 for Joint Stock accounting purposes. In December 1994, the train was internally refurbished for the Indian Pacific upgrade and had an Ocean interior. |
| ARL | 962 | 1970-2-2 | N/A | Journey Beyond Rail Expeditions | Keswick Terminal | Renumbered 962 in 1974 for Joint Stock accounting purposes. In 1995, ARL962 was refurbished for the Indian Pacific and the interior theme was the Sturt's Desert Pea. |
| ARL | 963 | 1970-2-13 | N/A | Journey Beyond Rail Expeditions | Keswick Terminal | Renumbered 963 in 1974 for Joint Stock accounting purposes. This carriage featured on the first Ghan to Darwin on 1 February 2004. |
| DF | 964 | 1970-2-10 | N/A | Journey Beyond Rail Expeditions | Keswick Terminal | Renumbered 964 in 1974 for Joint Stock accounting purposes. The carriage was named the Tarcoola Restaurant somewhere between 2002 and 2006. |
| AOB | 265 | 1969-11-4 | N/A | Journey Beyond Rail Expeditions | Keswick Terminal | In May 1989, the interior was stripped for the conversion to the "Oasis Bar" lounge for use on the Legendary Ghan. Four months later, the carriage entered service with a central bar and longitudinal seating fitted. In May 2000, AOB265 was sent to the Islington Workshop for conversion to the Menindee Lakes lounge car with a smoking compartment. The carriage reentered service as the Menindee Lakes lounge car in July 2000 and received a lot of attention from Menindee Lake's tourism board and government authorities, local politicians and media guests. This carriage featured on the first Ghan to Darwin on 1 February 2004. In 2008, the carriage was then refurbished as the Sir Augustus & Francis Gregory Outback Explorer Lounge car. |
| CDF | 966 | 1969-9-18 | N/A | Journey Beyond Rail Expeditions | Keswick Terminal | Renumbered 966 in 1974 for Joint Stock accounting purposes. In 1990, the kitchen was extended into the sit-down table area, reducing the capacity of the carriage. In April 1994, the carriage was converted to a buffet/dining car with similar seating to the first class dining cars called "Matilda's Restaurant". |
| BRG | 267 | 1969-10-10 | N/A | Journey Beyond Rail Expeditions | Keswick Terminal | In 2019, the interior was stripped for conversion into a Platinum Service sleeping car. |
| BRJ | 268 | 1969-10-22 | N/A | Journey Beyond Rail Expeditions | Keswick Terminal | |
| BRG | 269 | 1969-10-30 | N/A | Journey Beyond Rail Expeditions | Keswick Terminal | In 2019, the interior was stripped for conversion into a Platinum Service sleeping car. |
| BRJ | 270 | 1970-2-27 | N/A | Journey Beyond Rail Expeditions | Keswick Terminal | BRJ270 was damaged on a delivery route from Sydney to Adelaide and had to be returned to Comeng at Granville for repairs. In 1970, the carriage was allocated to the Indian Pacific joint stock, with a small blue plate that says "Indian Pacific Car" affixed to the right end of each side of the carriage. It is the only Indian Pacific with the small blue plate that has not been renumbered to the 900 range. This carriage featured on the first Ghan to Darwin on 1 February 2004. |
| BRG | 271 | 1969-11-21 | N/A | Journey Beyond Rail Expeditions | Keswick Terminal | In January 1995, the interior of BRJ271 was refurbished for the Indian Pacific. In 2019, the interior was stripped for conversion into a Platinum Service sleeping car. |
| ARJ | 272 | 1969-9-17 | N/A | Journey Beyond Rail Expeditions | Keswick Terminal | In 1992, the carriage was externally refurbished, fitted with Indian Pacific nameboards. In December 1994, the carriage was sent to Port Augusta for general refurbishment and asbestos removal. In July 1995, ARJ272 entered service as a refurbished Indian Pacific carriage with a Kangaroo paw theme. |
| ARJ | 973 | 1969-9-19 | N/A | Journey Beyond Rail Expeditions | Keswick Terminal | Renumbered 973 in 1974 for Joint Stock accounting purposes. In 2006, the carriage was sent to Victoria for refurbishment. |
| ARJ | 282 | 1972-2-8 | N/A | Journey Beyond Rail Expeditions | Keswick Terminal | In 1989, the Legendary Ghan colour scheme was applied to the exterior, which included a new Ghan board and desert-coloured stripes applied to the exterior. In March 1991, the carriage was again refurbished for the Ghan, but this time internally. ARJ282 was named the Alegebuckina Car after refurbishment. |
| RZAY | 283 | 1972-2-22 (as a passenger car), 1997 (as a crew car) | 1997 (as a passenger car) 2009-1-30 (as a crew car) | *scrapped* | | In 1997, it was withdrawn from passenger service and sold to National Rail and converted to a crew car, recoded RZAY. On 30 January 2009, the carriage was destroyed in an accident at Golden Ridge and eventually scrapped. |
| ARJ | 984 | 1972-3-2 | N/A | Journey Beyond Rail Expeditions | Keswick Terminal | Renumbered 984 in 1974 for Joint Stock accounting purposes. |
| RZAY | 985 | 1972-2-22 (as a passenger car), 1997 (as a crew car) | 1997 (as a passenger car) N/A (as a crew car) | Pacific National | | Renumbered 985 in 1974 for Joint Stock accounting purposes. In 1997, it was withdrawn from passenger service and sold to National Rail and converted to a crew car, recoded RZAY. |
| RZAY | 986 | 1972-2-22 (as a passenger car), 1997 (as a crew car) | 1997 (as a passenger car) N/A (as a crew car) | Pacific National | | Renumbered 986 in 1974 for Joint Stock accounting purposes. In 1997, it was withdrawn from passenger service and sold to National Rail and converted to a crew car, recoded RZAY. |
| ARM | 987 | 1969-2-08 | Unknown | *likely scrapped* | | Renumbered 987 in 1974 for Joint Stock accounting purposes. Because it wasn't recorded on the sale to a third-party and the carriage being leased back to Great Southern Rail in 2002, the carriage is very likely to be scrapped. |
| ARM | 288 | 1969-2-08 | N/A | Journey Beyond Rail Expeditions | Keswick Terminal | In 1988, the Legendary Ghan colour scheme was applied to the exterior, which included a new Ghan board and desert-coloured stripes applied to the exterior. In June 1990, the carriage was again refurbished for the Ghan, but this time internally. ARM288 was named the Alegebuckina Car after refurbishment. This carriage featured on the first Ghan to Darwin on 1 February 2004. |
| ARL | 289 | 1972-7-7 | N/A | Journey Beyond Rail Expeditions | Keswick Terminal | In 1992, the carriage was externally refurbished, fitted with Indian Pacific nameboards. In December 2003, the carriage was fitted with even newer Indian Pacific nameboards. |
| ARM | 990 | 1972-6-30 | N/A | Journey Beyond Rail Expeditions | Keswick Terminal | Renumbered 990 in 1974 for Joint Stock accounting purposes. In 1988, ARM990 was used on the Brisbane Expo Express to Brisbane. In 1992, the carriage was externally refurbished, fitted with Indian Pacific nameboards. In September 2002, two of the centre compartments (9/10 and 11/12) were converted into one single luxury compartment and the carriage was recoded ARM. This carriage featured on the first Ghan to Darwin on 1 February 2004. |
| ARL | 291 | 1972-7-19 | N/A | Journey Beyond Rail Expeditions | Keswick Terminal | In 1988 the Legendary Ghan colour scheme was applied to the exterior, which included a new Ghan board and desert-coloured stripes applied to the exterior. In May 1990, the carriage was internally refurbished as the Edward's Creek Car. In September 2002, the carriage was refurbished with a wheelchair-accessible compartment replacing the conductor's compartment. This carriage featured on the first Ghan to Darwin on 1 February 2004. |
| ARL | 992 | 1972-8-30 | N/A | Journey Beyond Rail Expeditions | Keswick Terminal | Renumbered 992 in 1974 for Joint Stock accounting purposes. In December 1994, the train was internally refurbished as the Mt Christie Car for the Indian Pacific upgrade and had an Ocean interior. On 12 December 2006, the carriage was damaged in an accident involving a truck and the Ghan train at Ban Ban Springs. In February 2007, the carriage was then sent to Taree for repairs. It is still in service despite the accident. |
| ARL | 293 | 1972-9-01 | N/A | Journey Beyond Rail Expeditions | Keswick Terminal | In December 2003, the carriage was fitted with even newer Indian Pacific nameboards. |
| DF | 294 | 1972-10-3 | N/A | Journey Beyond Rail Expeditions | Keswick Terminal | In 1988, this carriage was used on the Brisbane Expo express. In 2006, the carriage was sent to Victoria for refurbishment and returned to service in 2008 as the Queen Adelaide Restaurant Car. |
| DF | 295 | 1972-10-3 | 1995-12-x | The Picnic Train | Goulburn, New South Wales | In 1995, this carriage was withdrawn from use and was recorded to be scrapped. However, like many other carriages, DF295 was sold to International Development Services. In 1998, the carriage was sold to Mr M.Menzies of Victoria for a company called Rail Experience. It is currently leased to The Picnic Train operating heritage steam train tours across NSW. |
| HGM | 296 | 1973-1-9 | N/A | Journey Beyond Rail Expeditions | Keswick Terminal | |
| HGM | 297 | 1973-12-19 | N/A | Journey Beyond Rail Expeditions | Keswick Terminal | This carriage featured on the first Ghan to Darwin on 1 February 2004. |
| HGM | 298 | 1974-1-16 | N/A | Journey Beyond Rail Expeditions | Keswick Terminal | In 2006, the interior was refitted. The interior was refurbished and the control system was updated. |
| BRG | 999 | 1973-7-5 | N/A | Journey Beyond Rail Expeditions | Keswick Terminal | Renumbered 999 in 1974 for Joint Stock accounting purposes. In 1995, the carriage was internally refurbished for the Indian Pacific upgrade. In 2019, the interior was stripped for conversion into a Platinum Service sleeping car. |
| BRJ | 300 | 1973-7-27 | 1995-12-x | Port Pirie Train Graveyard | Port Pirie | In 1995, this carriage was withdrawn from use due to accident damage and was recorded to be scrapped. However, like many other carriages, BRJ300 was sold to International Development Services. In 1998, the carriage was sold to Mr M.Menzies of Victoria for a company called Rail Experience. The carriage is now derelict at the Port Pirie Train Graveyard. |
| AFC | 301 | 1973-8-13 | N/A | Journey Beyond Rail Expeditions | Keswick Terminal | In October 1994, the carriage was converted from a BRJ 2nd class sleeping car to an AFC 1st class lounge car. After the conversion to a lounge car, AFC213 was named the Flinders Lounge and fitted with a smoking compartment as part of the Indian Pacific upgrade. Due to negative attitudes against smoking, the size of the smoking lounge was reduced in 2003. This carriage featured on the first Ghan to Darwin on 1 February 2004. In 2008, the carriage was then refurbished as the John McDouall Stuart Outback Explorer Lounge car. |
| BRJ | 302 | 1973-11-8 | N/A | Journey Beyond Rail Expeditions | Keswick Terminal | In 1992, the carriage was externally refurbished, fitted with Indian Pacific nameboards. The carriage was also internally refurbished in an upgrade for the Indian Pacific in 1995. This carriage featured on the first Ghan to Darwin on 1 February 2004. |
| BRJ | 303 | 1973-11-8 | N/A | Journey Beyond Rail Expeditions | Keswick Terminal | In 1992, the carriage was externally refurbished, fitted with the Legendary Ghan nameboard and colour scheme. This carriage featured on the first Ghan to Darwin on 1 February 2004. |
| DF | 304 | 1974-1-29 | N/A | Journey Beyond Rail Expeditions | Keswick Terminal | In December 1993, the car's interior was rebuilt, making it one of the Queen Adelaide Restaurant cars for use on the Indian Pacific (along with DF232 and DF233). In January 2002 and again in 2008, DF304 had both the interior and exterior refurbished. |
| AFC | 305 | 1974-3-1 | N/A | Journey Beyond Rail Expeditions | Keswick Terminal | In August 1974, the ceilings and air ducting panels were removed for the installation of colour TV due to the technology being ubiquitous. 2 months later, in October 1974, the trial was proved to be unsuccessful and therefore the colour TV was removed. In 1989, the Legendary Ghan colour scheme was applied to the exterior, which included a new Ghan board and desert-coloured stripes applied to the exterior. Furthermore, the carriage was also internally refurbished as the Dreamtime Lounge. On 12 December 2006, the carriage was damaged in an accident involving a truck and the Ghan train at Ban Ban Springs. In February 2007, the carriage was then sent to Taree for repairs. It is still in service despite the accident. In 2010, AFC305 had the internal layout replaced with the Outback Explorer Lounge format, and the carriage was renamed to the William Christie Gosse Outback Explorer lounge car. |
| AFC | 306 | 1974-2-8 | N/A | Journey Beyond Rail Expeditions | Keswick Terminal | In 1981, the lounge chairs were recovered after the carriage lost the chairs to an unknown cause. In 1983, colour TV and video was installed in the carriage. In 1992, the carriage was externally refurbished, fitted with Indian Pacific nameboards. In 1995, the carriage was completely rebuilt from a First Class lounge car to a Holiday (Second class) Lounge Car. This carriage featured on the first Ghan to Darwin on 1 February 2004. In 2010, the carriage was then rebuilt with a new internal layout and refurbished as the Red Gum Lounge. The former bar area became a cool room store with a single lounge area with tub chairs with the exception for the vestibule end of the carriage where there are three tables with four seats each. The Red Gum lounge was withdrawn on 1 April 2013, after the BRJ (Red Class) sleeping cars were also withdrawn. In 2016, along with AFC938, AFC939 and AFC936, AFC306 was refurbished as the Platinum Club car, featuring a bar as well as a lounge that can be converted into a dining area and back. This carriage seats 30 in the dining configuration and 20 in a lounge configuration in an Art-Deco style. |
| AFC | 307 | 1974-3-29 | N/A | Journey Beyond Rail Expeditions | Keswick Terminal | In 1984, colour TV and a video cabinet was fitted inside the carriage. The carriage was refurbished in 1995 with a smoking compartment and renamed the Silver City Lounge as part of the Indian Pacific upgrade. In 2008, the carriage was then refurbished as the Robert Burke and William Wills Outback Explorer Lounge car. |
| ARL | 308 | 1973-9-20 | N/A | Journey Beyond Rail Expeditions | Keswick Terminal | In March 1995, the train was internally refurbished as the Mt Christie Car for the Indian Pacific upgrade and had an Ocean interior. On 12 December 2006, the carriage was damaged in an accident involving a truck and the Ghan train at Ban Ban Springs. In February 2007, the carriage was then sent to Taree for repairs. It is still in service despite the accident. |
| ARL | 309 | 1973-10-04 | N/A | Journey Beyond Rail Expeditions | Keswick Terminal | In 1989, the Legendary Ghan colour scheme was applied to the exterior, which included a new Ghan board and desert-coloured stripes applied to the exterior. In August 1990, the carriage was internally refurbished as the Marla Car after refurbishment. This carriage featured on the first Ghan to Darwin on 1 February 2004. |
| ARL | 310 | 1973-10-26 | N/A | Journey Beyond Rail Expeditions | Keswick Terminal | In September 1994, the train was internally refurbished as the Mt Christie Car for the Indian Pacific upgrade and had an Ocean interior. |
| HM | 311 | 1974-3-26 | N/A | *scrapped* | | In December 1995, the carriage was fitted with a smoking compartment. In August 1999, the carriage was severely accident-damaged at Zanthus and eventually scrapped. |
| HM | 312 | 1969-4-22 | N/A | Journey Beyond Rail Expeditions | Keswick Terminal | For a brief period of time, the carriage was allocated to CME at Port Pirie. In 1996, the carriage was fitted with a smoking compartment. |
| ER | 313 | 1974-6-5 | N/A | Journey Beyond Rail Expeditions | Keswick Terminal | Internally refurbished in 1994 for use on the Indian Pacific. This carriage featured on the first Ghan to Darwin on 1 February 2004. |
| HGM | 900 | 1975-7-19 | N/A | Journey Beyond Rail Expeditions | Keswick Terminal | Renumbered 900 in 1974 for Joint Stock accounting purposes. |
| HGM | 317 | 1975-7-1 | N/A | Journey Beyond Rail Expeditions | Keswick Terminal | In 1989, the Legendary Ghan colour scheme was applied to the exterior, which included a new Ghan board and desert-coloured stripes applied to the exterior. This carriage featured on the first Ghan to Darwin on 1 February 2004. |
| HM | 901 | 1975-5-10 | N/A | Journey Beyond Rail Expeditions | Keswick Terminal | Renumbered 901 in 1974 for Joint Stock accounting purposes. In 1996, the carriage was fitted with a smoking compartment. |
| ARL | 920 | 1974-11-19 | N/A | Journey Beyond Rail Expeditions | Keswick Terminal | Renumbered 920 in 1974 for Joint Stock accounting purposes. In August 1995, the train was internally refurbished as the for the Indian Pacific upgrade and had a Waratah interior. Furthermore, compartments 17/18 were merged with the conductors compartment to make way for a disabled-access compartment. On 12 December 2006, the carriage was damaged in an accident involving a truck and the Ghan train at Ban Ban Springs. In February 2007, the carriage was then sent to Taree for repairs. It is still in service despite the accident. |
| ARL | 921 | 1974-12-18 | N/A | Journey Beyond Rail Expeditions | Keswick Terminal | Renumbered 921 in 1974 for Joint Stock accounting purposes. This carriage featured on the first Ghan to Darwin on 1 February 2004. |
| ARL | 922 | 1974-12-24 | N/A | Journey Beyond Rail Expeditions | Keswick Terminal | Renumbered 922 in 1974 for Joint Stock accounting purposes. In August 1995, the train was internally refurbished as the Mt Christie Car for the Indian Pacific upgrade and had a Kangaroo Paw interior. Furthermore, compartments 17/18 were merged with the conductors compartment to make way for a disabled-access compartment. |
| ARL | 923 | 1975-1-6 | N/A | Journey Beyond Rail Expeditions | Keswick Terminal | Renumbered 923 in 1974 for Joint Stock accounting purposes. Furthermore, compartments 17/18 were merged with the conductors compartment to make way for a disabled-access compartment. In August 1995, the train was internally refurbished as the for the Indian Pacific upgrade and had a Waratah interior. |
| ARL | 324 | 1975-5-6 | N/A | Journey Beyond Rail Expeditions | Keswick Terminal | In 1989, the Legendary Ghan colour scheme was applied to the exterior, which included a new Ghan board and desert-coloured stripes applied to the exterior. However, the only reason for the carriage being painted was because it was a spare car. This carriage featured on the first Ghan to Darwin on 1 February 2004. |
| ARL | 925 | 1975-5-19 | N/A | Journey Beyond Rail Expeditions | Keswick Terminal | Renumbered 925 in 1974 for Joint Stock accounting purposes. In December 1994, the train was internally refurbished as the for the Indian Pacific upgrade and had an Ocean interior. |
| ARL | 326 | 1975-7-15 | N/A | Journey Beyond Rail Expeditions | Keswick Terminal | In 1992, the carriage was externally refurbished, fitted with Indian Pacific nameboards. This carriage featured on the first Ghan to Darwin on 1 February 2004. |
| DF | 327 | 1975-3-6 | N/A | Journey Beyond Rail Expeditions | Keswick Terminal | Renumbered 959 in 1974 for Joint Stock accounting purposes. In 2006, the carriage was sent to Victoria for refurbishment and returned to service in 2008 as the Queen Adelaide Restaurant Car. |

== Gallery ==
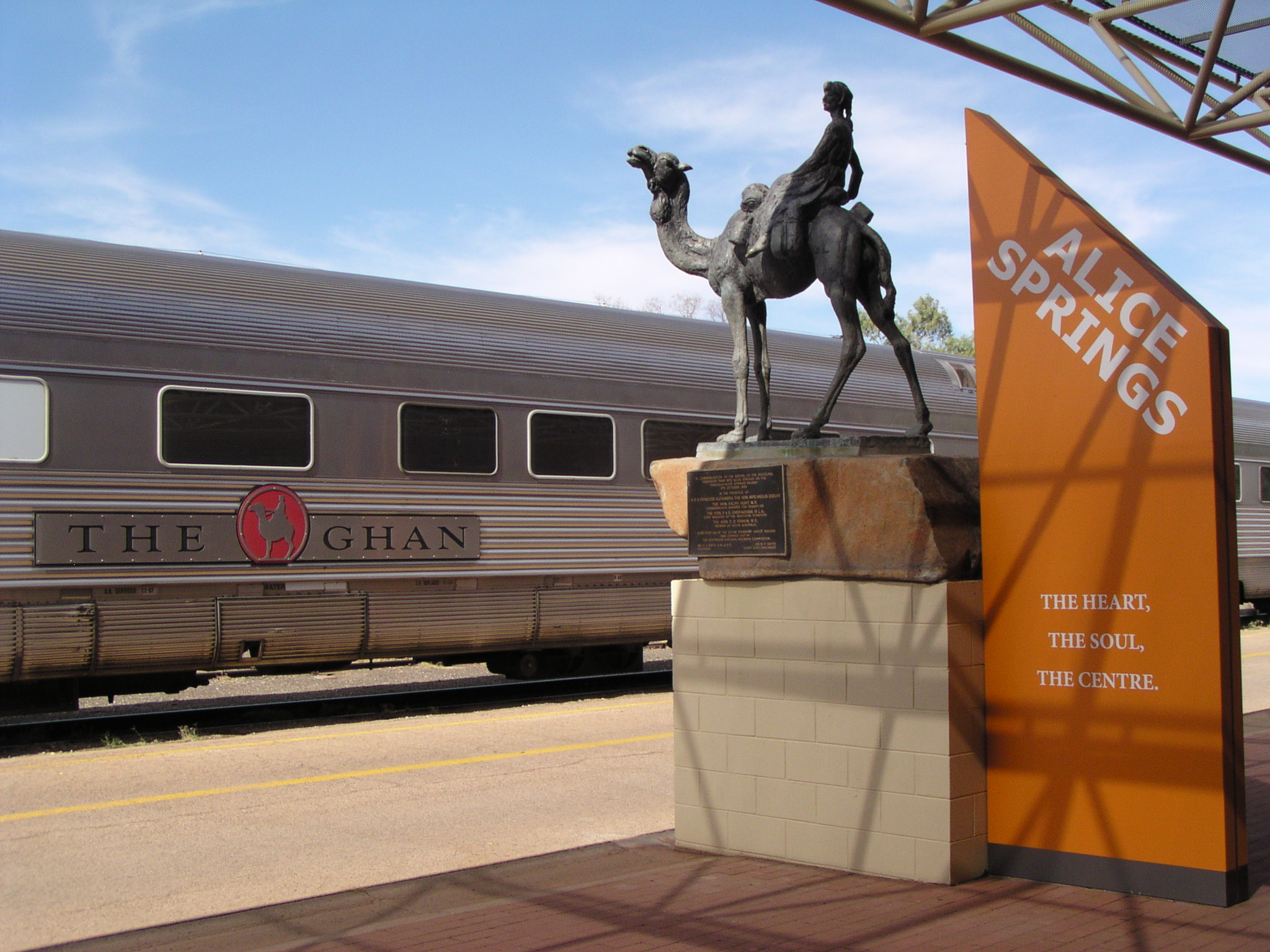
A Commonwealth Railways Stainless Steel Carriage pictured at Alice Springs

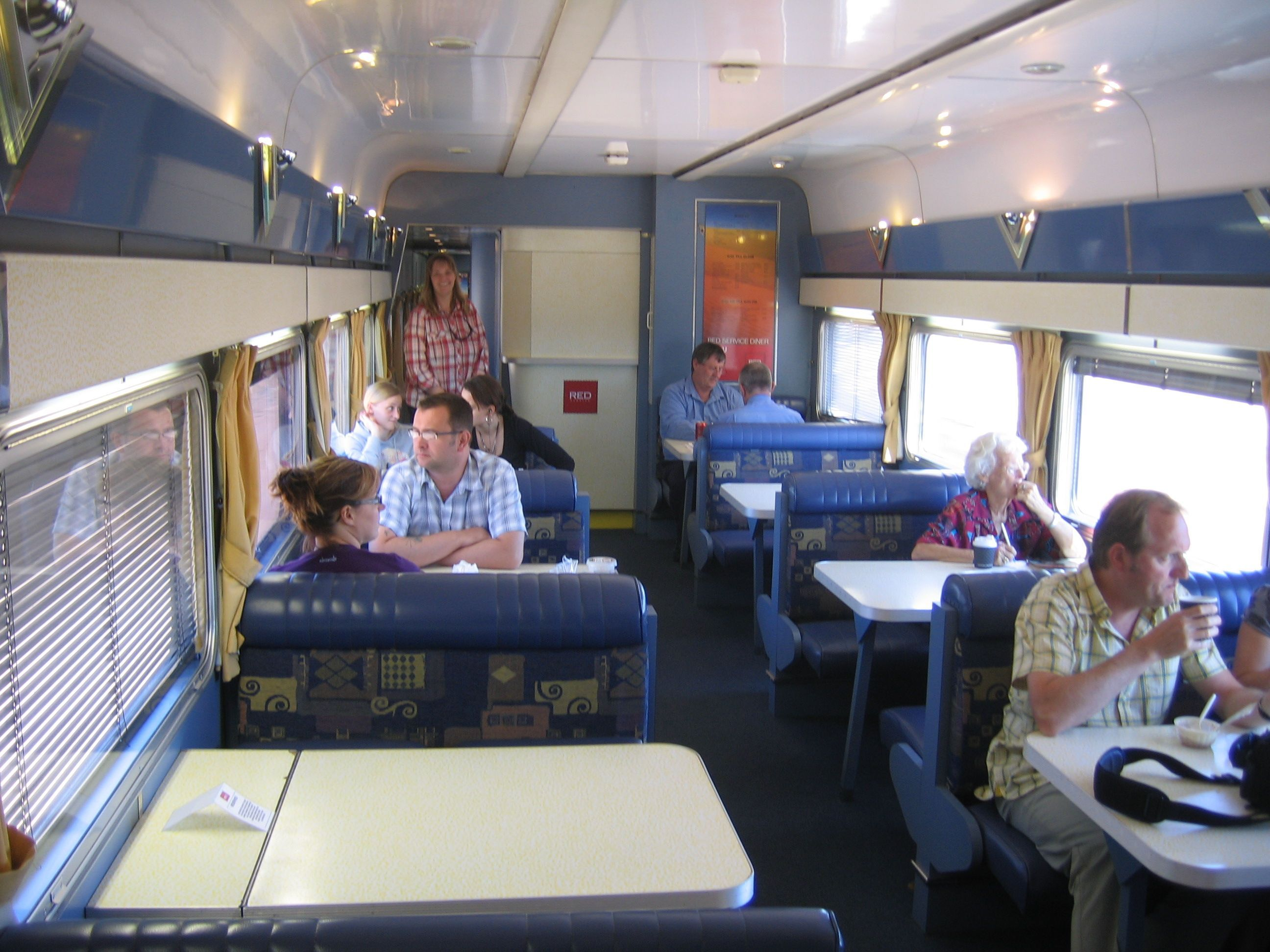
Inside a CDF dining car, The Matilda's Restaurant - formerly offered as a Red Class Dining Car on the Indian Pacific and Ghan.

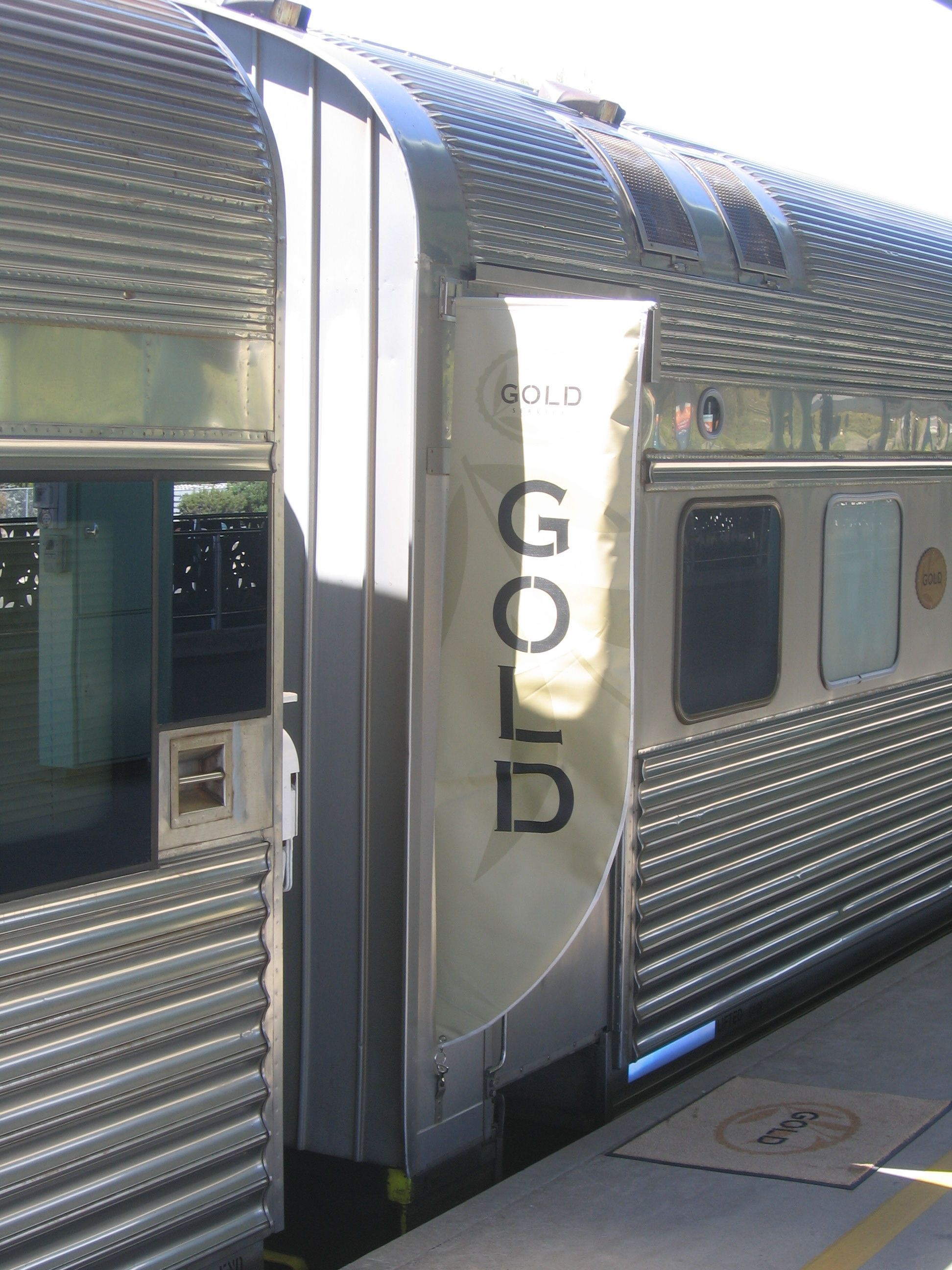
A Gold Class Sleeping Car (possibly ARM, ARL or ARJ) is pictured on the Ghan Service.

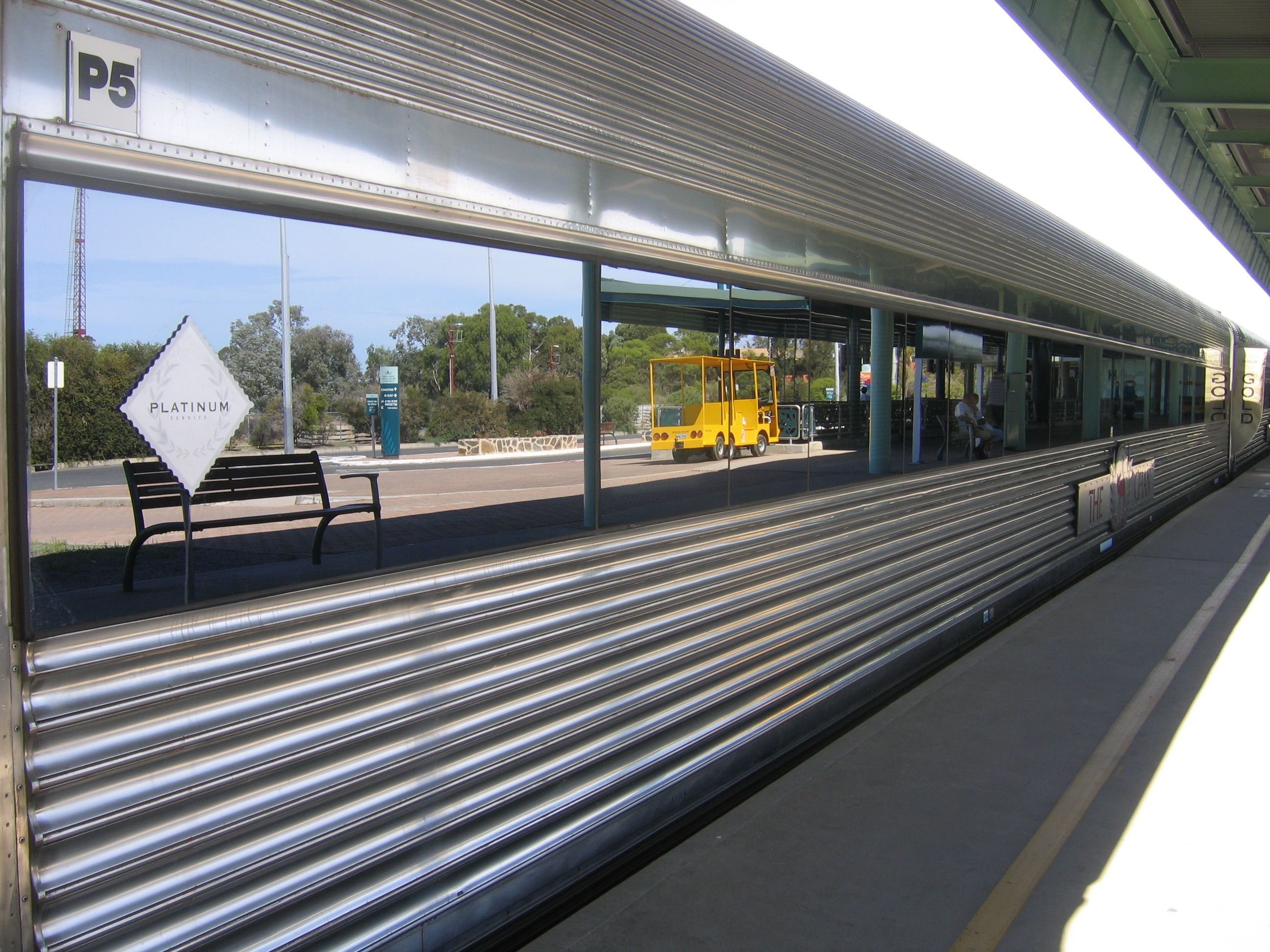
A Platinum Class Sleeping Car (BRG) is pictured on the Ghan Service.

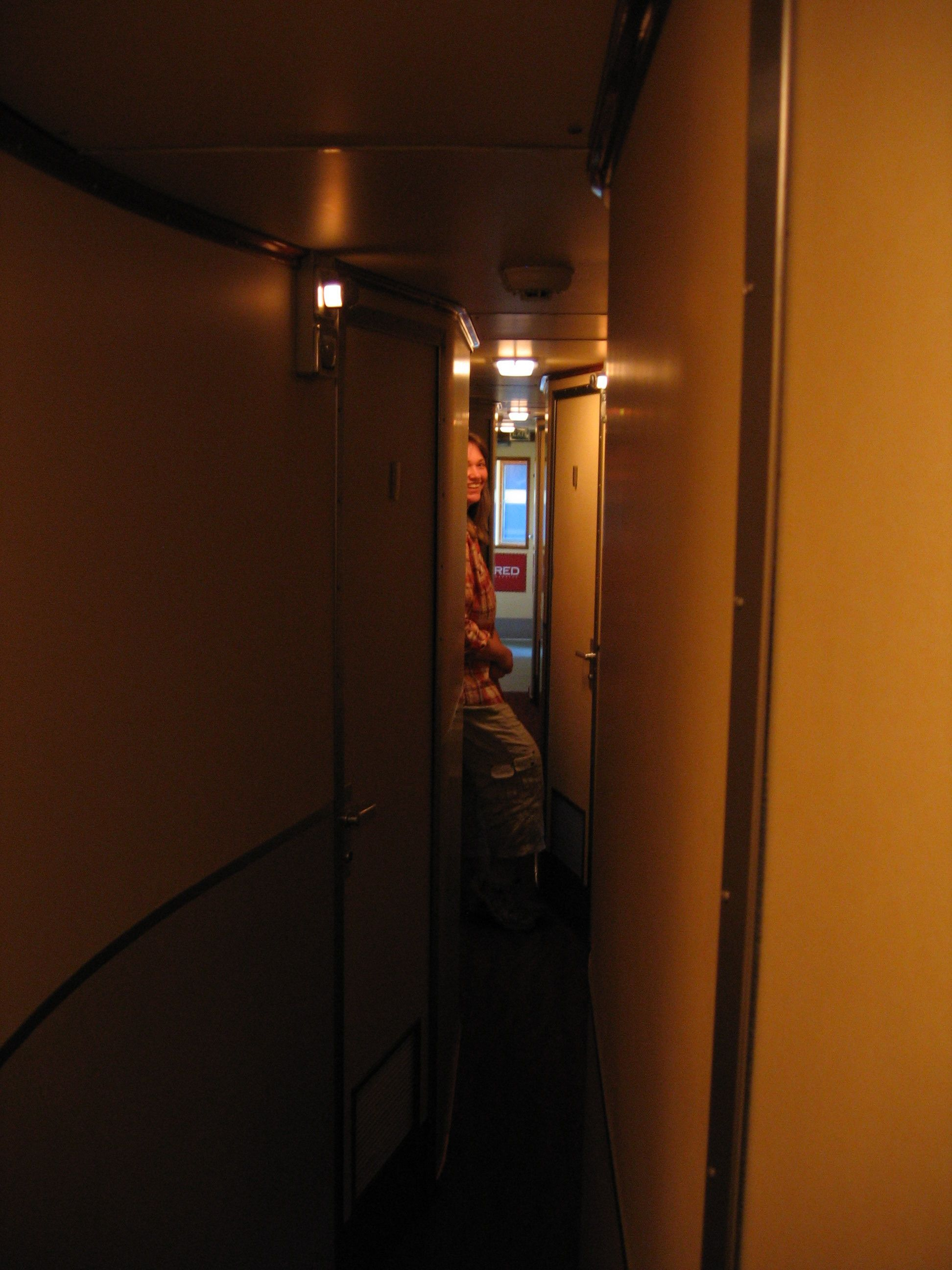
Inside a BRJ Red Class Sleeping Car.

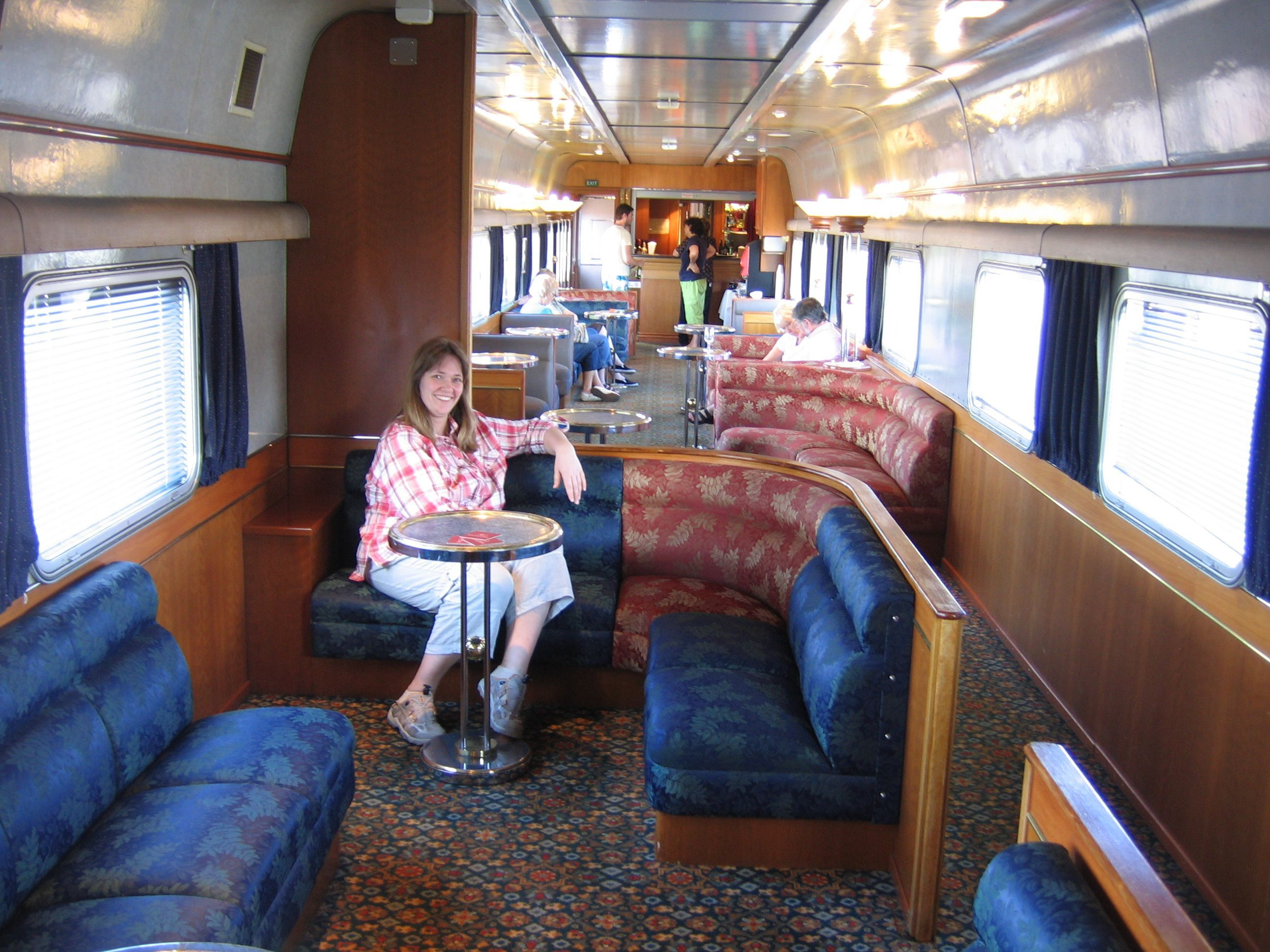
Inside an AFC Gold Class Lounge Car.

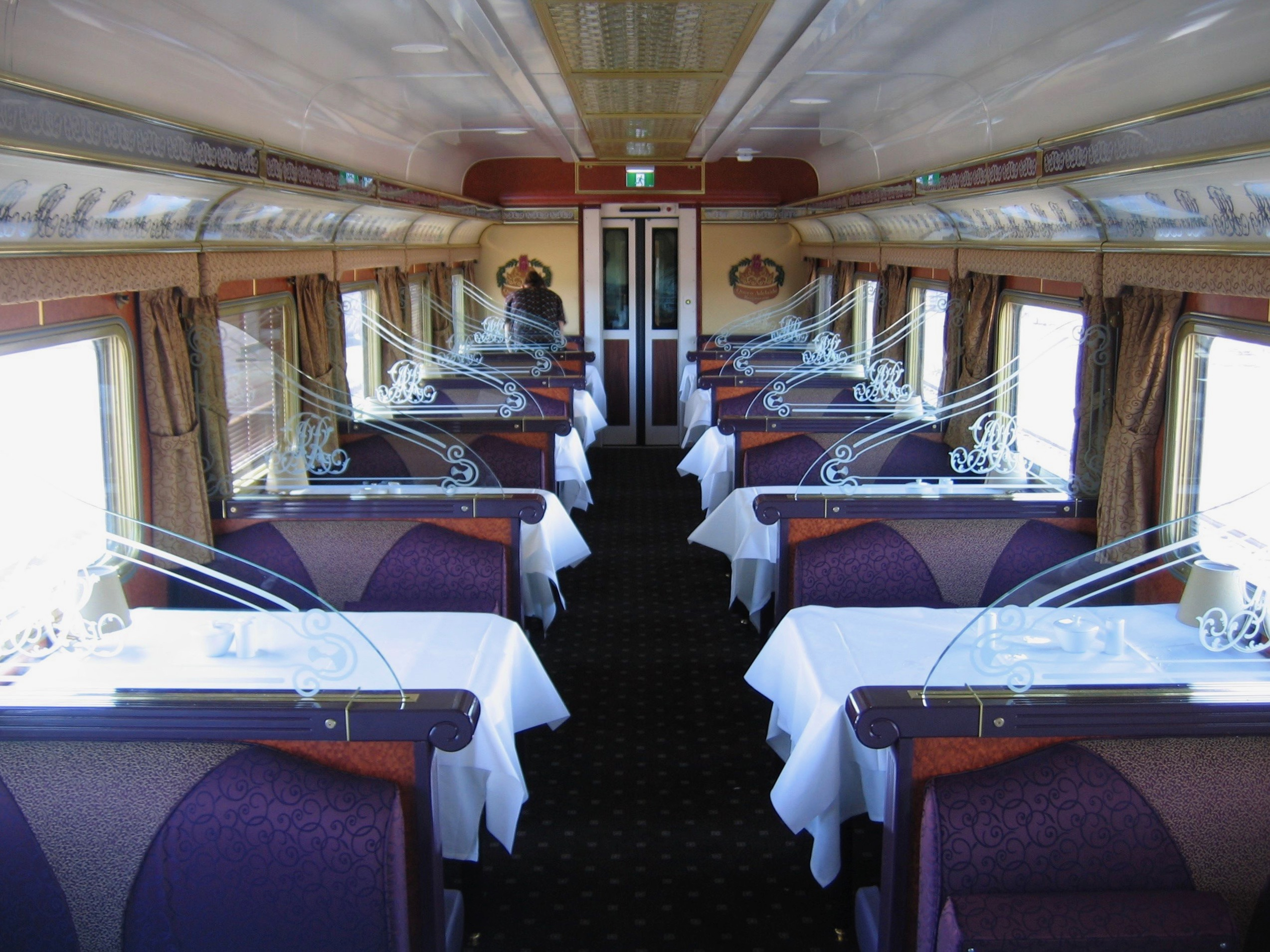
Inside the Queen Adelaide Restaurant (DF Gold Class Dining Car).

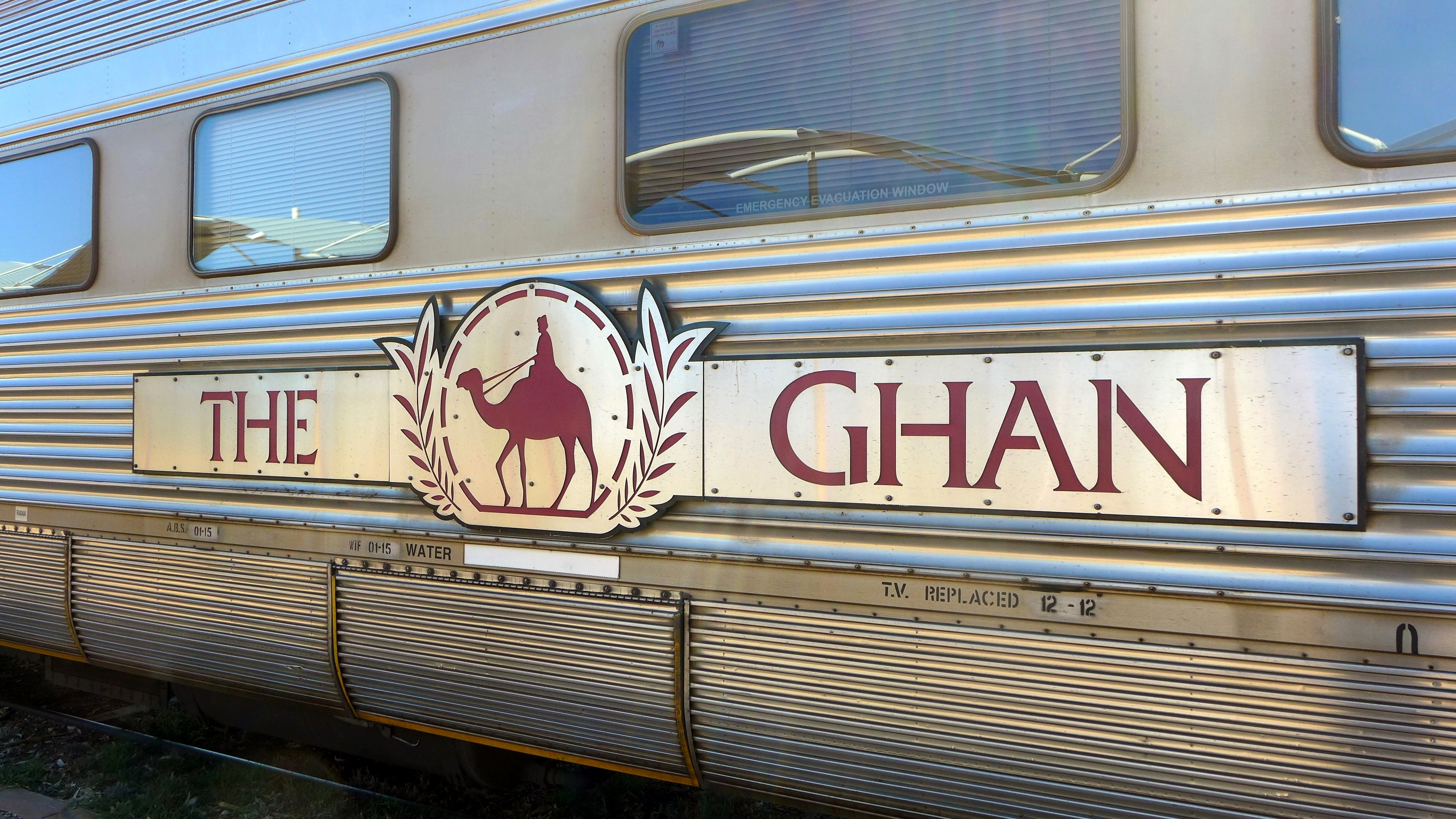
The exterior of AOB265. AOB265 was formerly the Oasis Bar and the Menindee Lakes Lounge Car.

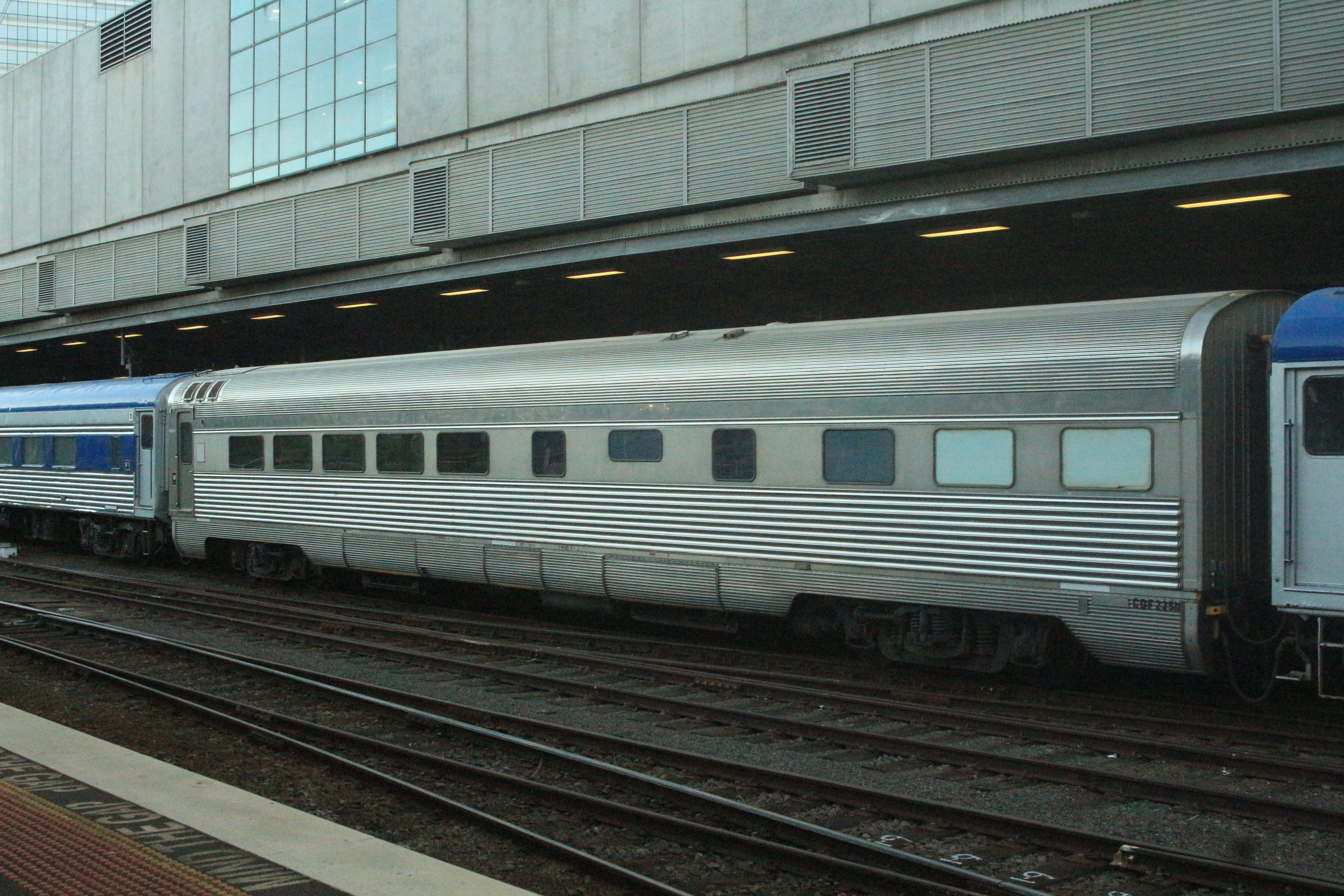
The exterior of CDF225, This and HM957 were a part of a special 10 carriage "The Overland" set

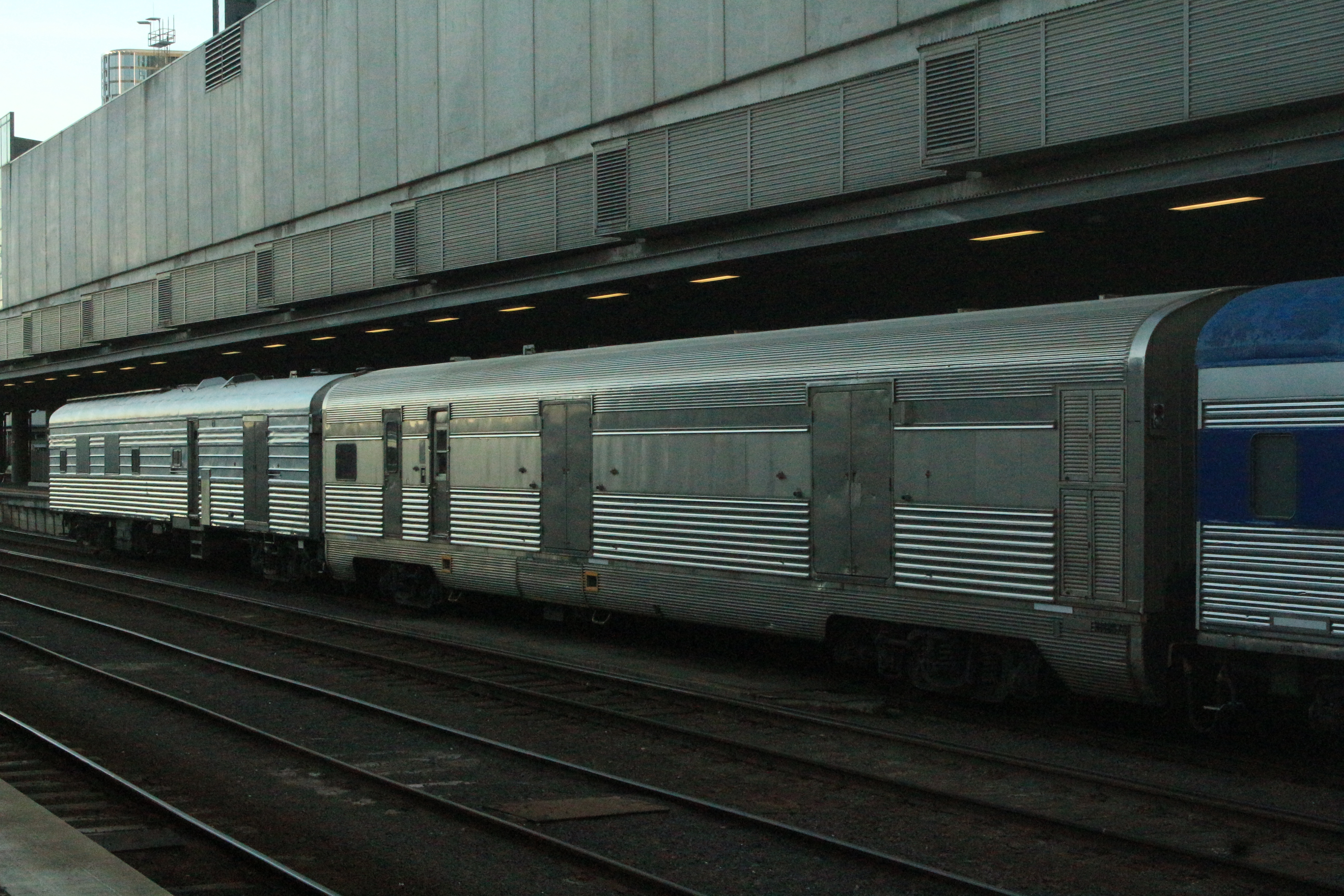
The exterior of HM957, This and CDF225 were a part of a special 10 carriage "The Overland" set
