= The Alice (disambiguation) =

The Alice is a common nickname for Alice Springs.

The Alice may also refer to:

- The Alice (film) (2004), an Australian drama film
- The Alice (train), an Australian passenger train service in the 1980s
- The Alice (TV series), a 2005 Australian drama television series

== See also ==
- Alice (disambiguation)
