= Adelaide Parklands Terminal =

Railway station in Adelaide, South Australia

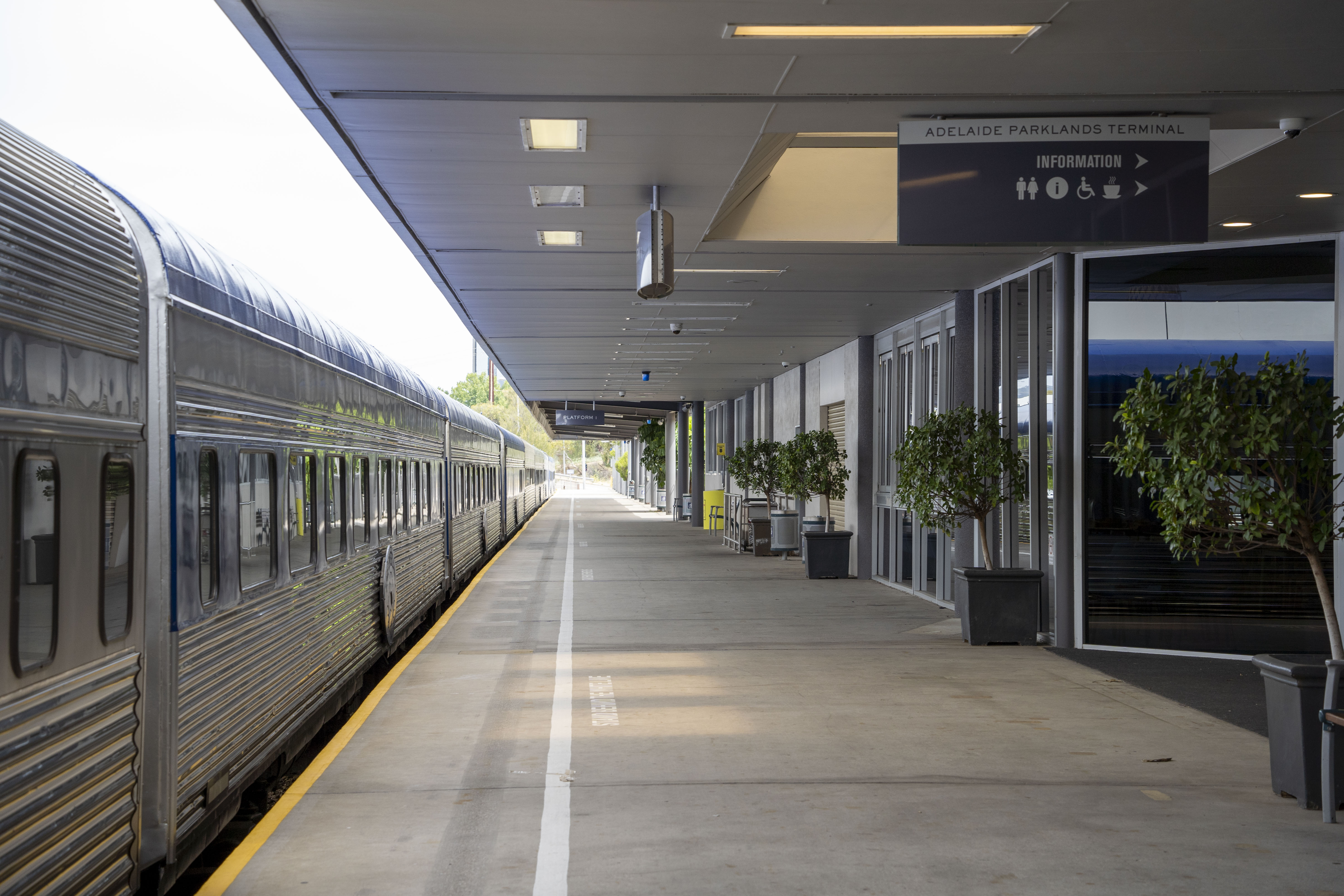
- Passenger cars for The Overland stabled at Adelaide Parklands Terminal in January 2024

General information
- Location: Richmond Road, Keswick Terminal
- Coordinates: 34°56′17″S 138°34′52″E
- Owner: Journey Beyond
- Operator: Journey Beyond
- Lines: The Overland; The Ghan; Indian Pacific; Great Southern
- Platforms: 3 (1 side, 1 island)
- Tracks: 3

Construction
- Structure type: Ground
- Parking: Yes

History
- Opened: 18 May 1984

Services
Preceding station	Journey Beyond	Following station
Cook towards Perth	Indian Pacific	Broken Hill towards Sydney
Coober Pedy One-way operation	The Ghan	Terminus
Marla towards Darwin	The Ghan	Terminus
Terminus	The Overland	Murray Bridge towards Melbourne
Terminus	Great Southern	Inverleigh One-way operation
Terminus	Great Southern	Stawell towards Brisbane
Location

Adelaide Parklands Terminal, originally known as Keswick Terminal, is the interstate passenger railway station in Adelaide, South Australia.

The terminal is north of the suburb of Keswick, 3 kilometres (1.9 miles) by road south-west of the city centre, and adjoins the south-western sector of the west Park Lands. It was within the boundary of Keswick until 1987 when, inclusive of adjacent business sites and covering a total area of 56.6 hectares (140 acres), Keswick Terminal was declared a suburb in its own right.

== History ==
The terminal opened on 18 May 1984 as Keswick Terminal, located opposite, but not connected to, the now demolished Keswick station. It was erected by the Australian National Railways Commission (AN) as a dedicated long-haul passenger rail station, allowing AN to vacate the State Transport Authority's Adelaide railway station, which had stub platform tracks of insufficient length for interstate passenger trains. It was included in the sale of Australian National's passenger operations to Great Southern Rail in 1997.

The station was renamed Adelaide Parklands Terminal in June 2008. following stage 1 of a plan to "improve guest comfort and amenity, traffic and passenger movement, food and retail facilities, image, identity, presentation and sustainability".

== Services ==
The terminal was built by Australian National as a dual gauge station for The Ghan, Indian Pacific and Trans-Australian to the north and The Overland to the south-east – the latter train being on 1600 mm (5 ft 3 in) broad-gauge tracks at the time, before conversion to 1435 mm (4 ft 8 1/2 in) standard gauge in 1995. It was also served by regional South Australian trains – also operated by Australian National – until all passenger train services outside of Greater Adelaide had ceased by 1990.

Since 1991, the only trains regularly operating out of the terminal have been The Ghan, Indian Pacific and The Overland; The Southern Spirit ran seasonally between 2010 and 2012, and the Great Southern commenced seasonal services in 2020. Today, these trains are operated by Journey Beyond.

Visiting passenger trains from interstate also visit the terminal, albeit rarely.

=== Local transport ===
Although three suburban rail lines run parallel to the terminal, they remain broad gauge and do not interchange with the long distance line at the terminal station; the nearest suburban railway station, Adelaide Showgrounds, is 700 metres (770 yards) to the south. The nearest bus stop is 450 metres (490 yards) away, also to the south.

== Gallery ==
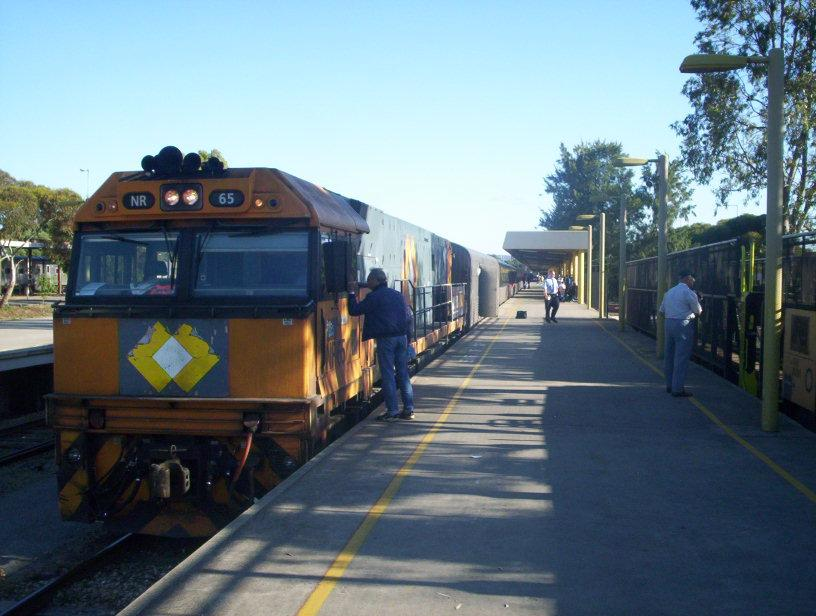
The Indian Pacific at the terminal

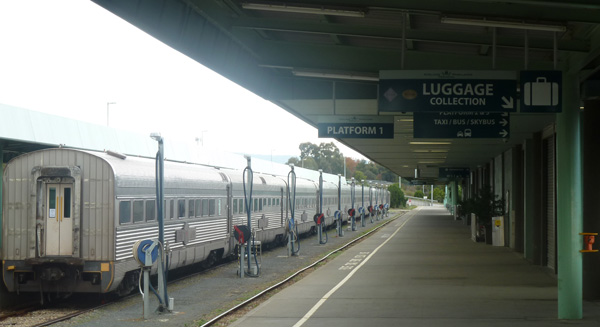
Main platform with carriages from The Ghan

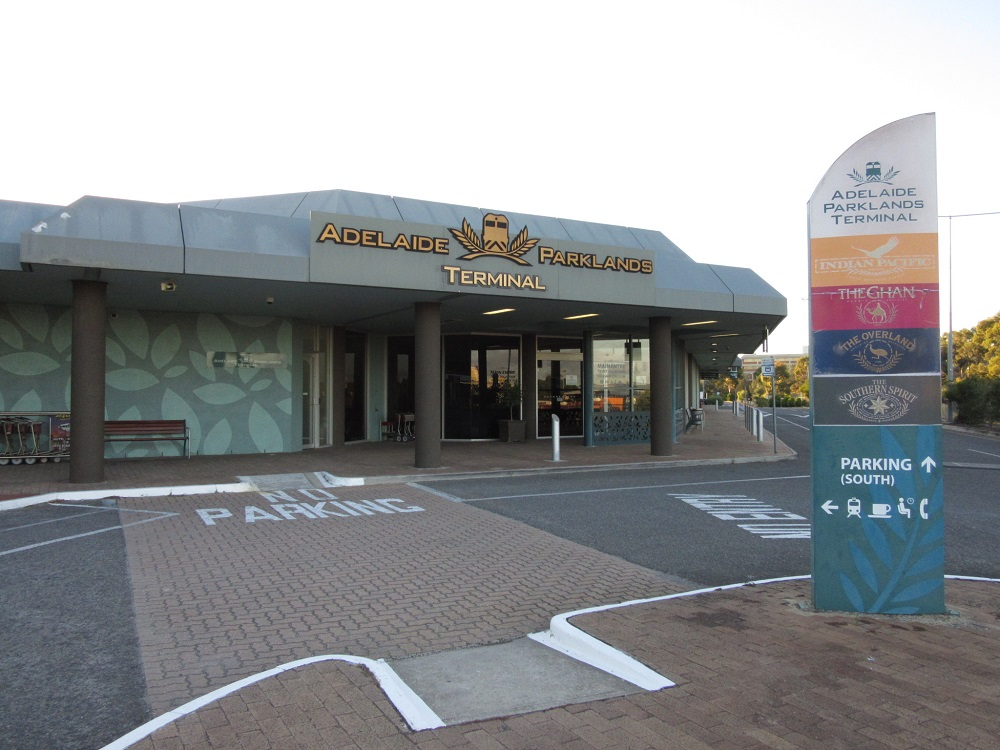
Terminal entrance (2014)

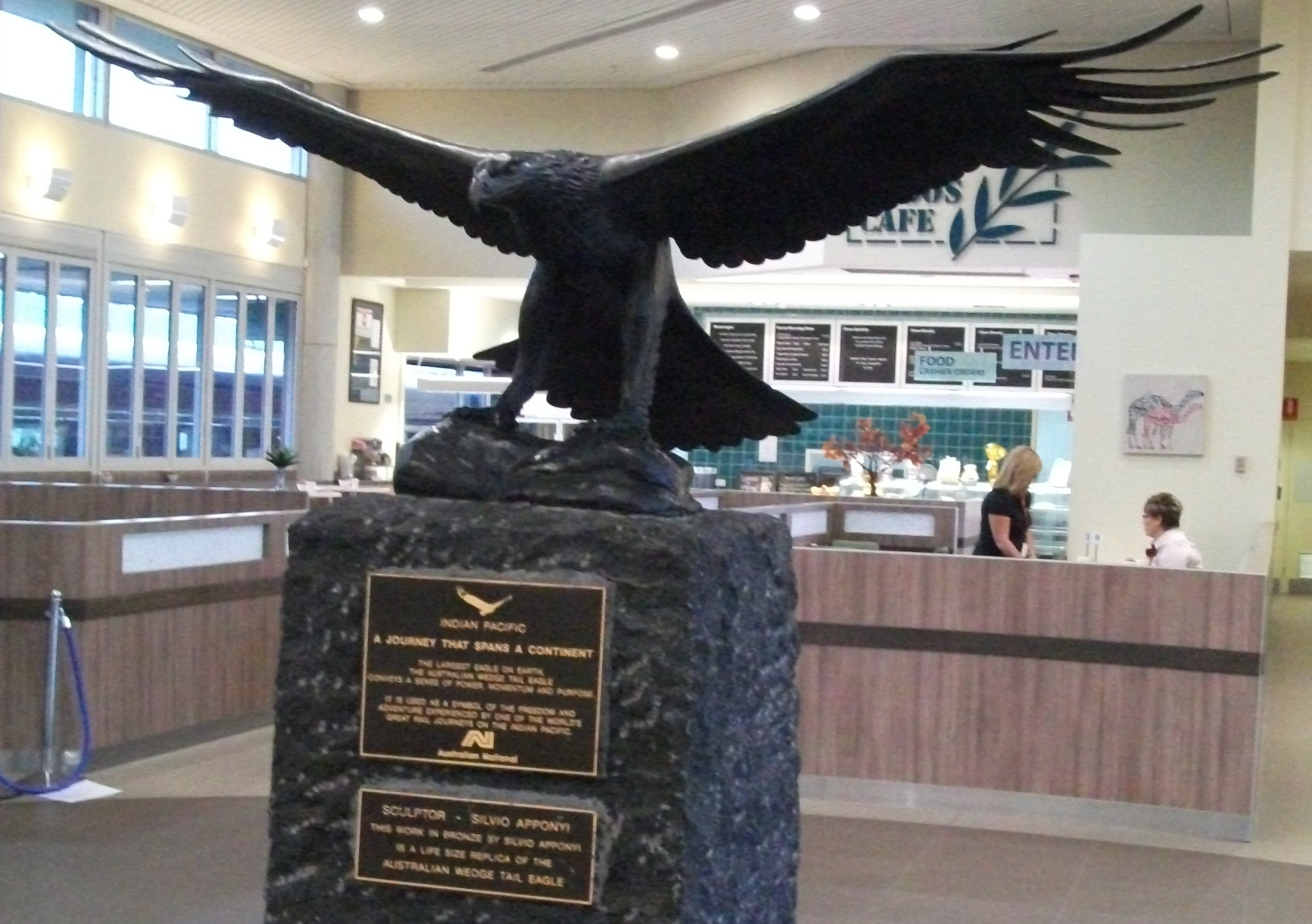
Choo Choos Cafe (2011)

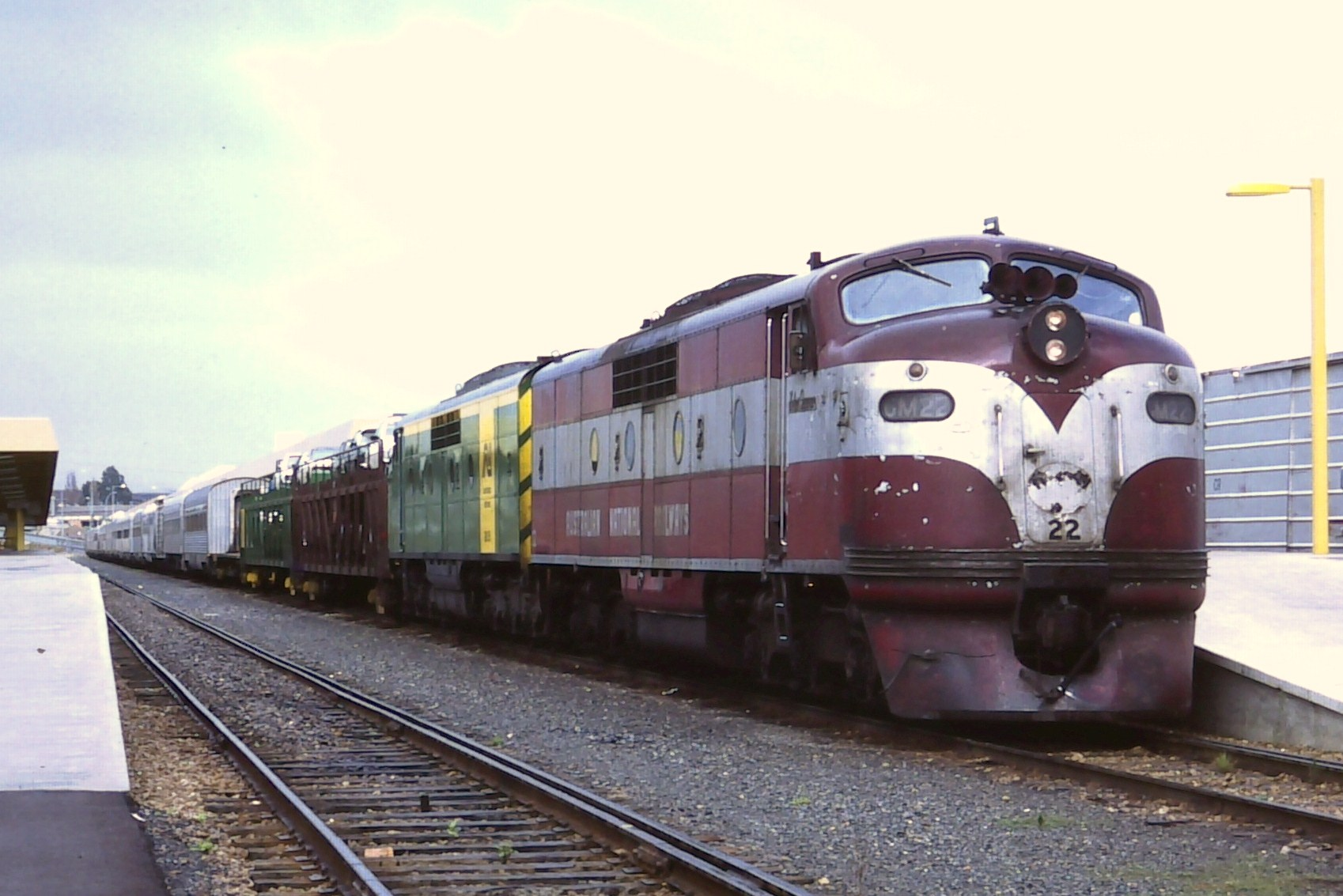
GM22 at the head of the Trans Australian in 1986. (Note dual gauge tracks)
