= The Alice (train) =

Australian train service 1983 to 1988

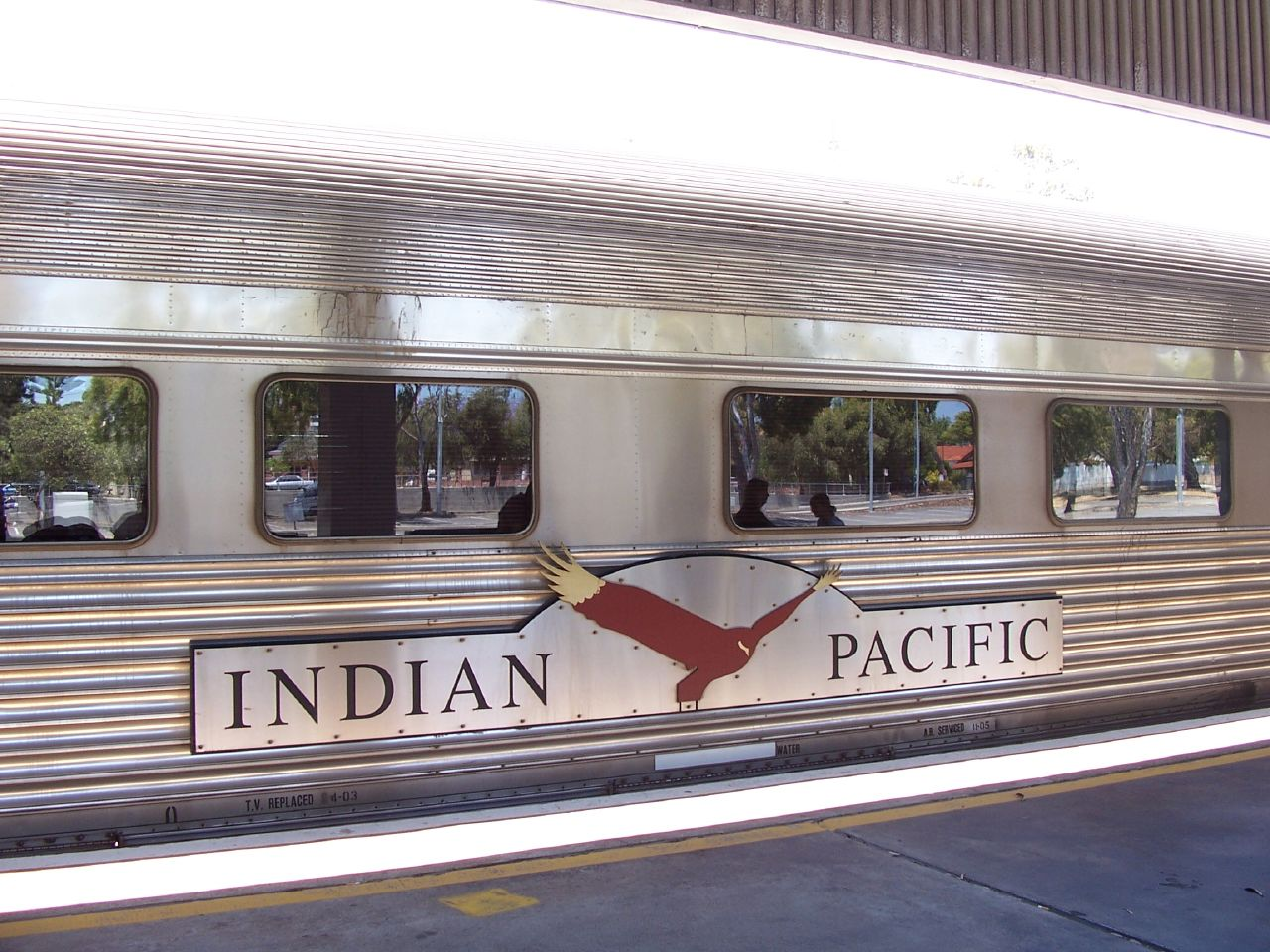
- Stainless steel carriages of the type used on The Alice

Overview
- Service type: Passenger train
- Status: Ceased
- First service: 14 November 1983
- Last service: 28 October 1987
- Former operator(s): State Rail Authority; Australian National

Route
- Termini: Sydney Central; Alice Springs
- Distance travelled: 2,857 kilometres
- Average journey time: 47 hours
- Service frequency: 1 per week
- Train number(s): WE3/WE4
- Line(s) used: Main Western; Broken Hill; Trans Australian; Central Australian

Technical
- Rolling stock: Comeng stainless steel carriages
- Track gauge: 1,435 mm

The Alice was an Australian passenger train service that ran between Sydney and Alice Springs from November 1983 until 1988.

== History ==
The origins of The Alice can be traced back to 1982 when Railways of Australia suggested that one of the four weekly Indian Pacific services from Sydney to Perth be diverted to Alice Springs. In October 1982 a trial run was operated carrying media representatives, travel managers and rail executives.

The first service departed Sydney on 14 November 1983. It was jointly operated by the State Rail Authority and Australian National as a tourist train with sightseeing stops at Broken Hill, the South Australia / Northern Territory border, Kulgera, the Iron Man statue and the Finke River Bridge.

It operated weekly departing Sydney on Mondays and Alice Springs on Wednesday, taking 47 hours to complete the 2,857 kilometre journey.

It was suspended from December 1986 until March 1987, to allow the rolling stock to be used for extra Indian Pacific services during the 1987 America's Cup in Fremantle. With dwindling patronage, the last service departed Alice Springs on 28 October 1987.

== Revival ==
The service was revived in April 1999, when The Ghan from Alice Springs to Adelaide was rerouted to Sydney on selected journeys. This ceased in March 2003.

== Formation ==
The Alice was formed of stainless steel carriages built for the Indian Pacific and had accommodation for 142 first class passengers. The Alice Springs bound service also included State Rail Authority RUB sitting carriages as far as Port Pirie. These returned east attached to an Indian Pacific service.

It was hauled by State Rail Authority 46 class and 86 class electric locomotives from Sydney to Lithgow where an 80 class diesel took over for the journey to Broken Hill, from where Australian National GM class locomotives took over for the journey to Alice Springs.
