= The Southern Spirit =

Luxury train in Australia, 2010–2012

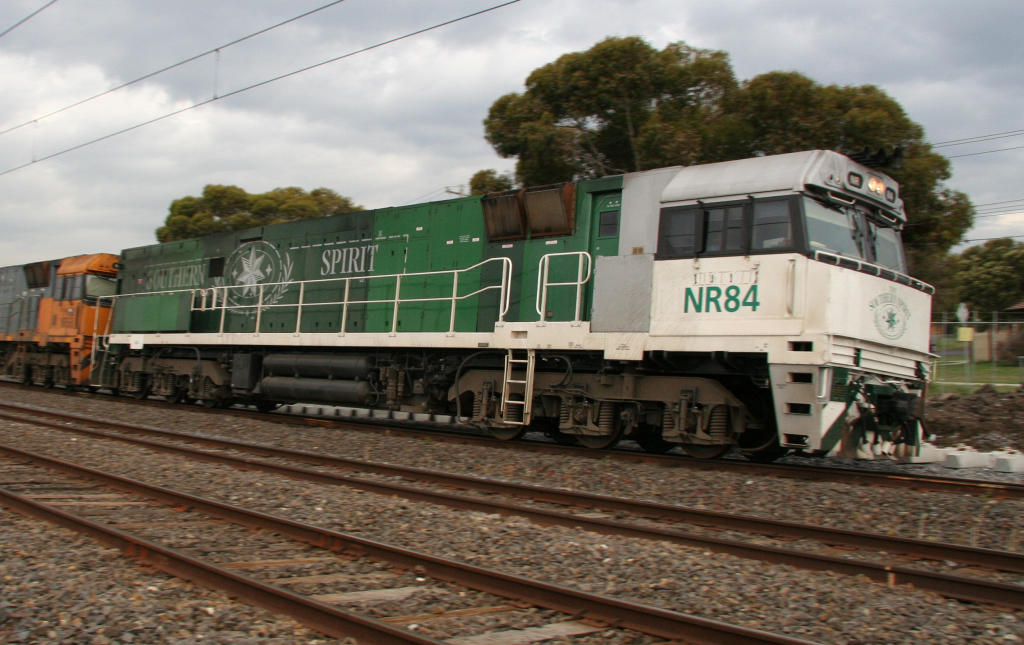
- Southern Spirit liveried NR class locomotive in December 2008

Overview
- Service type: Passenger train
- Status: Ceased
- First service: 9 January 2010
- Last service: 2012
- Current operator: Great Southern Rail

The Southern Spirit was a luxury rail cruise train operated by Great Southern Rail in Australia. The train was launched in June 2008 and was planned to travel all over Australia, with the first service originally planned to have run in November 2008. The train was planned to operate from November to February each year and to combine train travel with overnight hotel stays and other experiences similar to land excursions during sea cruises.

The inaugural journey departed on 9 January 2010, travelling from Uluru to Brisbane over 13 nights. The itinerary included Kings Canyon, Alice Springs, Coober Pedy, Kangaroo Island, Phillip Island and the Hunter Valley.

== Service ==
Passengers on the train were accommodated in five 'Platinum class' carriages refurbished at a cost of $12 million, with compartments twice the size of the 'Gold class' carriages on other Great Southern services, and feature double beds rather than two bunks. At the end of the cruise season, the carriages were transferred for use on The Ghan. The cost of each tour was between $7,000 and $14,000 depending on the cruise and the class of travel. Haulage of the train is provided by Pacific National NR class locomotives, as with other Great Southern services with NR84 and NR85 repainted into a special livery for the train at Chullora in September 2008. The carriages were Commonwealth Engineering built stainless steel carriages built in the late 1960s for use on the Indian Pacific and Trans-Australian.

Each rail cruise during a season was intended to cover a different route, travelling to cities already visited by Great Southern Rail such as Katherine, Darwin, Adelaide, Perth, and Sydney; and tourist locations that are not, such as Brisbane, Canberra, Coffs Harbour, and the Hunter Valley. The varied journeys were offered during the January 2010 season, but afterward were concentrated on Adelaide and Melbourne to Brisbane with services operated in January 2011, and February 2012. The Great Southern, launched in 2019, runs between Adelaide and Brisbane, while The Ghan is not operating, similar to The Southern Spirit.
