= Keswick Terminal =

- Suburb
- Coordinates: 34°56′09″S 138°34′47″E
- Country: Australia
- State: South Australia
- City: Adelaide
- LGA: City of West Torrens
- Established: 1987

Government
  - State electorate: West Torrens
  - Federal division: Adelaide

Population
  - Total: 0 (SAL 2016)
- Postcode: 5035
Suburbs around Keswick Terminal
Mile End	Mile End	Adelaide Park Lands
Mile End South	Keswick Terminal	Adelaide Park Lands
Keswick	Keswick	Wayville

Keswick Terminal is an inner south-western industrial suburb of Adelaide, South Australia in the City of West Torrens.

It is bounded by Mile End to the north and north west, Mile End South to the west, Keswick to the south west and south, Wayville to the south east and Park 23 of Adelaide Park Lands which contains West Terrace Cemetery to the east and north east.

The suburb is entirely commercial and has a population of zero. It contains Netball SA Stadium, the Head Office of Australian Rail Track Corporation, Woolworths Adelaide Central Customer Fulfillment Centre, the distribution centre for Haigh's Chocolates, the headquarters of the South Australian Country Fire Service, the South Australian State Emergency Service, the South Australian Metropolitan Fire Service, the South Australian Fire and Emergency Services Commission, the South Australia State Emergency Service Volunteers' Association, the South Australian Country Fire Service Volunteers Association and the South Australian Country Fire Service Foundation, the News Corp Australia Adelaide Print Center and the Adelaide Parklands Terminal.

The suburb was officially gazetted on 30 April 1987 by then the Minister of Lands, Roy Abbott with the area previously being the southern portion of Mile End.
