= Violet Town rail accident =

Railway accident

Coordinates: 36.6333°S 145.733°E

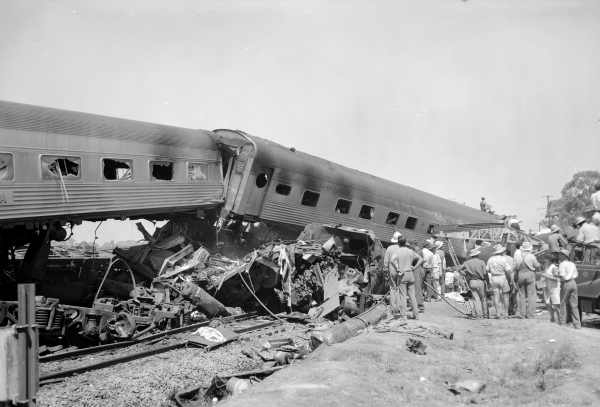
- LeDawn Archive, Pictures Collection, State Library Victoria

Details
- Date: 7 February 1969
- Location: Violet Town, Victoria; 173 km (107 mi) N from Melbourne
- Country: Australia
- Line: North East railway line
- Operator: Victorian Railways
- Incident type: Collision
- Cause: Driver heart attack

Statistics
- Trains: 2
- Passengers: 190
- Deaths: 9
- Injured: 117

On 7 February 1969, following the incapacitation of the driver of one of the trains, the Southern Aurora collided with a goods train near the McDiarmids Road crossing, approximately 1 kilometre (0.62 mi) south of Violet Town, Victoria, Australia. The crash resulted in nine deaths and 117 injuries.

== Background ==
The Southern Aurora was an overnight express service between the two largest Australian cities, Melbourne and Sydney. The service began in 1962 with the opening of the North East standard gauge line in Victoria, which enabled direct rail traffic between the two capitals for the first time. Owned and operated jointly by the Victorian Railways (VR) and New South Wales Government Railways (NSWGR), the Southern Aurora ran in both directions each night with first-class sleeping carriages making up the entire train.

Disputes between VR and NSWGR during the design and construction phase of the passenger carriages had led to several compromises, including the ability to fit bogies of the preferred types of both railways. Due to the insistence of manufacturer Commonwealth Engineering, stainless steel was eventually selected as the primary material, despite the initial reluctance of the railways, who wished to use their own existing carriage designs. Among the vaunted benefits of stainless steel construction was its superior crashworthiness, a benefit that was maximised by late design changes made to improve the energy-absorbing capacity of the draw gear between carriages.

Freight services had also begun on the standard gauge line in 1962, with the commissioning of facilities at Melbourne's South Dynon. Passenger services like the Aurora shared the primarily single-track main line with freight traffic in both directions; it was usual practice for freight trains to be held at passing loops (short sections of double track) in order to minimise delays to passenger timetables. One such crossing loop was located at Violet Town, around 170 km (110 mi) in rail distance to the north-east of Melbourne. The loop had a length of 915 m (3,002 ft), and, like the rest of the standard gauge line between Melbourne and Albury, signals and points were operated by centralised traffic control from Melbourne.

On the night of the accident, 7 February 1969, the Southern Aurora from Sydney departed with fourteen carriages, carrying a near-capacity load of 192 passengers and 22 crew by the time it reached Violet Town. Its driver was Jack Bowden, a highly experienced 52-year-old VR employee; its fireman was 30-year-old Mervyn Coulthard; and its guard William Wyer. A fast freight train of 22 wagons, mostly containing new cars, had departed Melbourne at 1:25 a.m. travelling north, driven by Lawrence Rosevear and supported by relief driver Arnfried Brendecke. The train controller on duty at Train Control in Melbourne was Frank McDonnell.

== Accident ==
The southbound Southern Aurora and northbound freight train were timetabled to cross at Benalla, north of Violet Town, at 6.44 a.m. The freight train was scheduled to enter the Benalla crossing loop at 6.15 a.m. However, at 6.30 a.m., McDonnell observed that both the Southern Aurora and the goods train were running behind schedule, and so he decided to have the trains pass each other at Violet Town instead. The driver of the goods train was instructed to prepare for a "running cross", under which the freight train would be diverted into the loop line at slow speed, while the Southern Aurora continued on the main line.

As the Southern Aurora passed through Benalla, driver Bowden increased its speed to the limit of 70 mph (110 km/h), which was maintained up to the point of impact. Shortly afterwards, his train passed an automatic signal showing "normal speed warning". That signified that the next signal might have a "stop" indication. Although it was standard practice to slow a train by at least 10 mph (16 km/h) after receiving such a warning, Bowden did not respond in any way. It was later established that he had died about 6 miles (10 km) before the crash, and had probably not been in effective control of the train for some time before that.

After noticing the warning indication on the signal, and anticipating a lengthy stop at Violet Town, fireman Coulthard said he had left his seat and gone into the nose of the locomotive to fill the electric kettle with water. While performing that task, he heard and felt the train pass over the points at the start of the crossing loop. He noted that the Southern Aurora had not reduced speed. Upon re-entering the main driving cab, he saw the "stop" signal ahead and the headlights of the freight train. He shouted at Bowden to stop the train, and ran into the engine room behind the cab to take shelter.

The freight train had approached Violet Town at 50 mph (80 km/h), and driver Rosevear saw the headlight of the approaching Southern Aurora. He slowed his train to 35 mph (56 km/h) to safely enter the crossing loop, but realised the oncoming passenger train was not going to stop to allow him to do so. He applied the emergency brake and flashed the headlight of his locomotive in an attempt to warn the driver of the Southern Aurora. He then opened the cab door and helped fireman Brendecke to jump out, before seeking refuge in the engine room of his locomotive.

Shortly before 7 a.m., the trains collided head-on at a closing speed later estimated at 172 km/h (107 mph). According to Brendecke (who survived his fall from the cab and the subsequent crash), as well as motorists on the adjacent Hume Highway, the force of the collision propelled the locomotive of the Southern Aurora, and several of the goods wagons, into the air. Six of the passenger carriages were derailed, and one was completely crushed by other wreckage. The two leading carriages telescoped into the rear of the locomotive, and two others rode over the top of the wreckage, suspending them some 30 ft (9 m) in the air.

Immediately following the crash, spilt diesel fuel caused the locomotive of the goods train to catch fire. The flames quickly spread to the derailed Southern Aurora carriages, where passengers were already attempting to escape through broken windows.

== Aftermath ==
Local Country Fire Authority volunteers in Violet Town witnessed the crash, and immediately began organising the firefighting response. Initially, the Euroa Urban Fire Brigade, the nearest major fire service, was told of a collision between two trucks, and later of a truck hit by a train; firefighters were not aware that a major rail accident had occurred until they arrived on scene to find the burning wreckage. Over 100 firefighters eventually arrived from neighbouring districts to assist with the firefighting, rescue and recovery effort.

Train controller McConnell observed the crash on his control panel and immediately reported the circumstances to his supervisor, and a recovery effort was shortly underway in Melbourne. Aircraft from the Department of Civil Aviation, the Royal Australian Air Force and Trans Australia Airlines were used to transport rescuers, railway officials and investigators to the crash site.

== Memorial ==
A stone cairn was erected on the 25th anniversary of the tragedy by the Public Transport Corporation at the site of the accident. Hundreds attended the commemoration in the early morning, which was followed by a morning tea.

In early 2018, a local group announced plans to expand the memorial significantly, saying that the existing cairn naming only a "public transport official" was an inadequate tribute to the disaster. The plans include signage listing the names of both the dead and local rescuers who were awarded for their bravery, and organisers anticipated their completion prior to the 50th anniversary of the crash in 2019.
