= Journey Beyond =

Australian tourism company

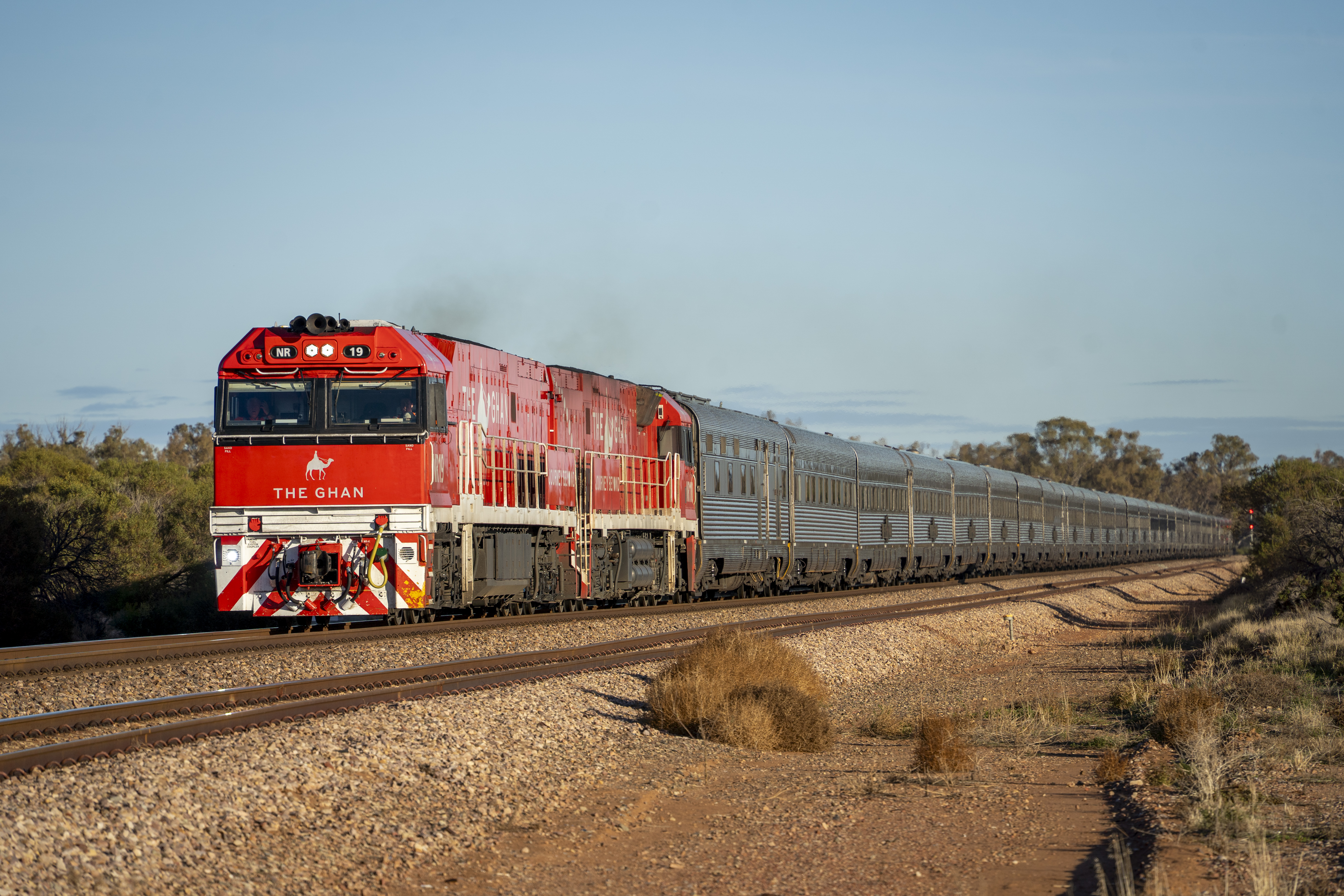
- The Ghan passenger train is operated by Journey Beyond and travels between Adelaide and Darwin
- Industry: Experiential tourism
- Founded: 2017
- Headquarters: Adelaide, South Australia, Australia
- Key people: Chris Tallent (CEO)
- Services: Travel
- Parent: Crestview Partners
- Subsidiaries: Captain Cook Cruises
- Website: www.journeybeyondrail.com.au

Journey Beyond is the trading name and brand deployed since 2017 by a succession of companies providing experiential tourism in Australia, including luxury trains (The Ghan, the Indian Pacific, and the Great Southern) and The Overland interstate service. "Journey Beyond" is also included in the names of a number of associated companies. The business, headquartered in Adelaide, South Australia, now has interests in cruise and air tourism in addition to rail.

== History ==
Before the 1990s, the government-owned Australian National, was the owner and operator of Australia's interstate railways and freight and passenger trains, operated under a subsidiary known as Pax Rail. From 1996 to 1998, Australian National was broken up and in 1997 its interstate passenger trains — The Ghan, Indian Pacific and The Overland — were sold to Great Southern Rail (GSR), a consortium of GB Railways, Legal & General, Macquarie Bank, RailAmerica and Serco for $16 million.

Included in the sale were 186 items of rolling stock, mainly former Commonwealth Railways stainless steel carriages, and the Adelaide Parklands Terminal and Alice Springs railway station. In October 1999, Serco bought the remaining 50.8% of shares from its consortium partners for $18.9 million, becoming the sole owner. GSR owned the passenger car fleet and provided services, and Pacific National provided the motive power.

Between 2008 and 2012, Great Southern Rail operated The Southern Spirit as a luxury cruising train service offering eight luxury rail cruises on a variety of outback Australian train routes.

In 2015, Serco sold the business to private equity company Allegro Funds for £2.5 million. Allegro led a transformation of GSR from a transport operator heavily dependent on government subsidies for passenger operations into a profitable experiential travel provider. Sixteen months after their initial purchase, Allegro sold a 70% stake in the company to Quadrant Private Equity.

In 2019, Great Southern Rail was rebranded as Journey Beyond Rail Expeditions and Great Southern became the name of a train running between Adelaide and Brisbane, weekly during the summer months. Subsequently the brand name reverted to Journey Beyond.

Acquisitions since 2015 included Cruise Whitsundays and Rottnest Express ferry companies, the Eureka Tower Skydeck, Horizontal Falls Seaplane Adventures, Outback Spirit Tours, Sal Salis Ningaloo Reef, Darwin Harbour Cruises and Vintage Rail Journeys (NSW rail tours). As of 2022, it was Australia's largest experiential tourism business.

In January 2022, Quadrant Private Equity sold its 13 brands, including the trains, for a reported A$600 million. The buyer was the San Francisco-based Hornblower Group, owned by Crestview Partners, a New York-based private equity firm. Hornblower Group operated cruises and tours, including Hornblower Cruises, which operated from 125 American cities. After failing to find a buyer in 2023, Hornblower filed for bankruptcy in February 2024; Journey Beyond activities were separated from the group and came under sole ownership of Crestview Partners.

In February 2026 Captain Cook Cruises and SeaLink businesses were purchased from the Kelsian Group. The following month, Voyages Indigenous Tourism Australia, which operates Ayers Rock Resort and Mossman Gorge Cultural Centre, was purchased from the Indigenous Land and Sea Corporation.
