= Great Southern (train) =

Australian rail service

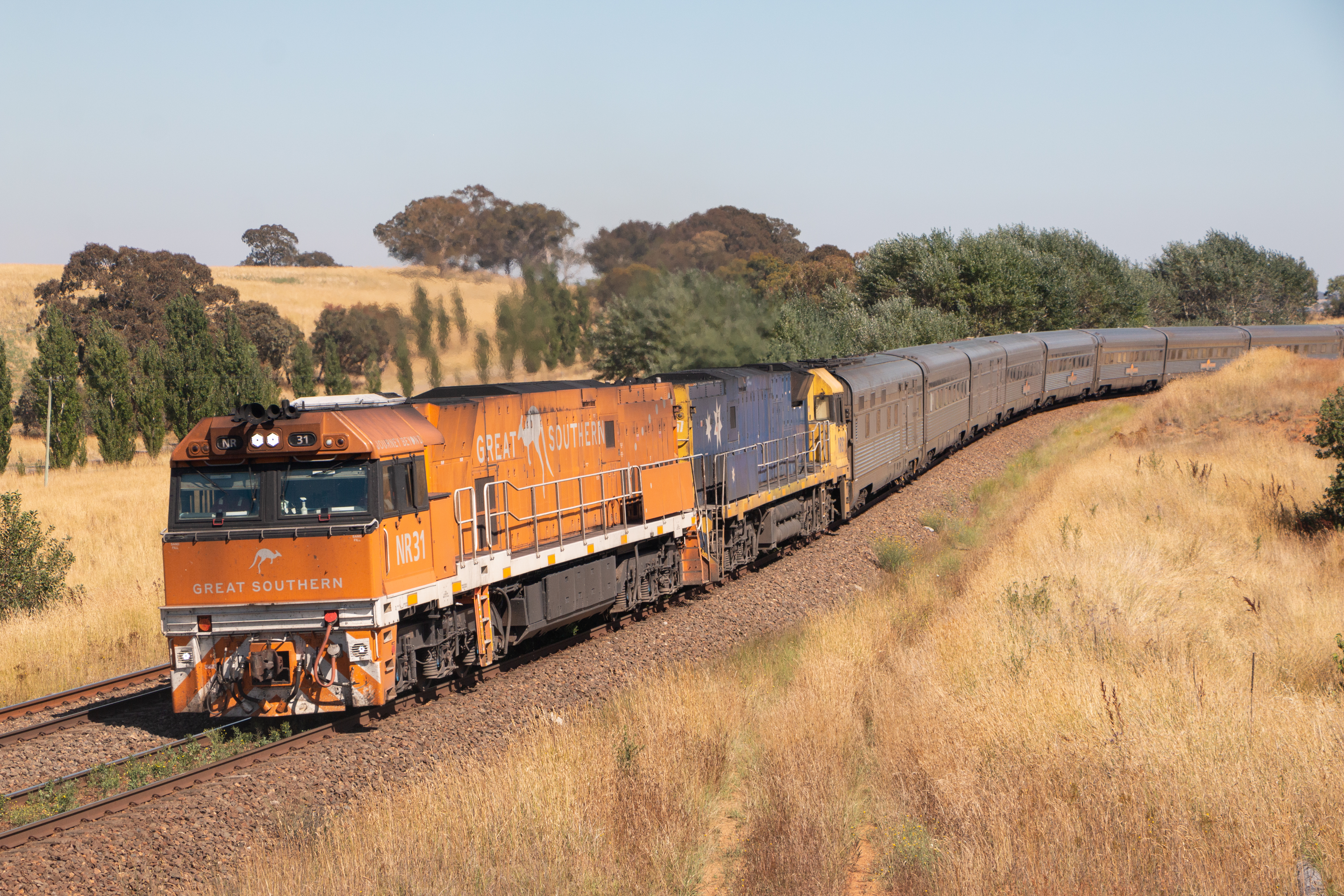
- The Great Southern passing through the Cullerin Ranges in 2023.

Overview
- Service type: Transcontinental passenger service
- Status: Running, December to February
- Locale: Australia
- First service: 6 December 2019
- Current operator: Journey Beyond

Route
- Termini: Adelaide Parklands Terminal; Brisbane Acacia Ridge Intermodal Terminal

On-board services
- Seating arrangements: No
- Sleeping arrangements: Yes

Technical
- Rolling stock: Commonwealth Railways stainless steel carriage stock
- Track gauge: 1,435 mm (4 ft 8 1/2 in)

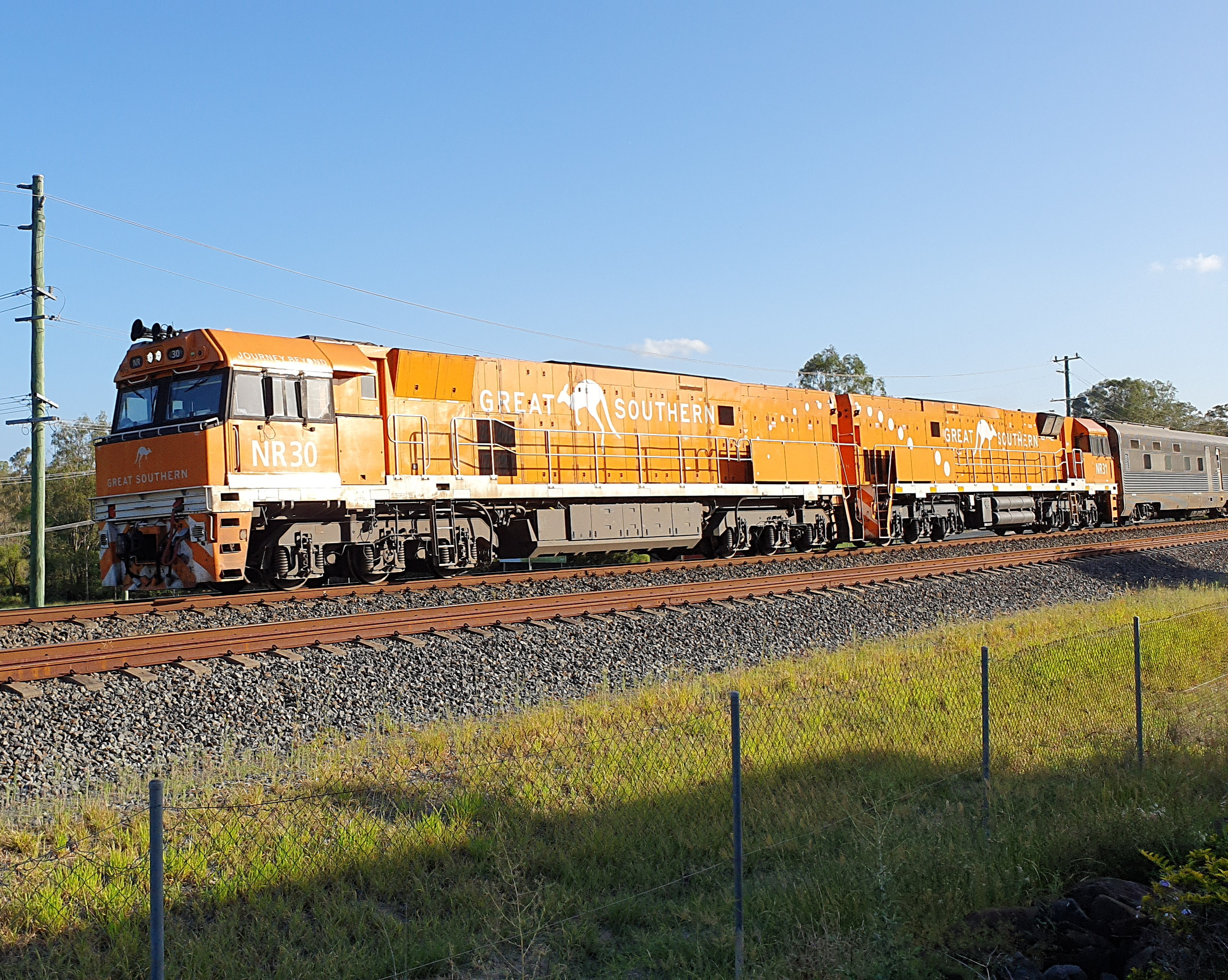
NR30 and NR31 pulling Great Southern at Greenbank QLD, 4th Dec 2022

The Great Southern is an Australian experiential tourism train operated since 2019 by Journey Beyond between Adelaide and Brisbane. It runs both ways during the summer months of December to February, when The Ghan is not running.

Similar to Journey Beyond's other luxury rail holidays on The Ghan and the Indian Pacific, the Great Southern is a slow journey across the country with a series of off-train guided tours along the route. The Adelaide to Brisbane service takes three days and features guided tours of the Grampians National Park in Victoria, Canberra and beaches along the northern coast of New South Wales. The Brisbane to Adelaide service takes four days with beachside dining in northern New South Wales, a guided tour of the Hunter Valley and Newcastle, and a stop at the Twelve Apostles.

Although Brisbane's Roma Street station handles all other long-distance rail services, like the Brisbane XPT, the length of the train precludes the Great Southern from terminating there. Instead, the service terminates at a freight terminal in the southern suburb of Acacia Ridge., from where transfers to Brisbane are available.
