= Ballan railway station =

Railway station in Victoria, Australia

Ballan
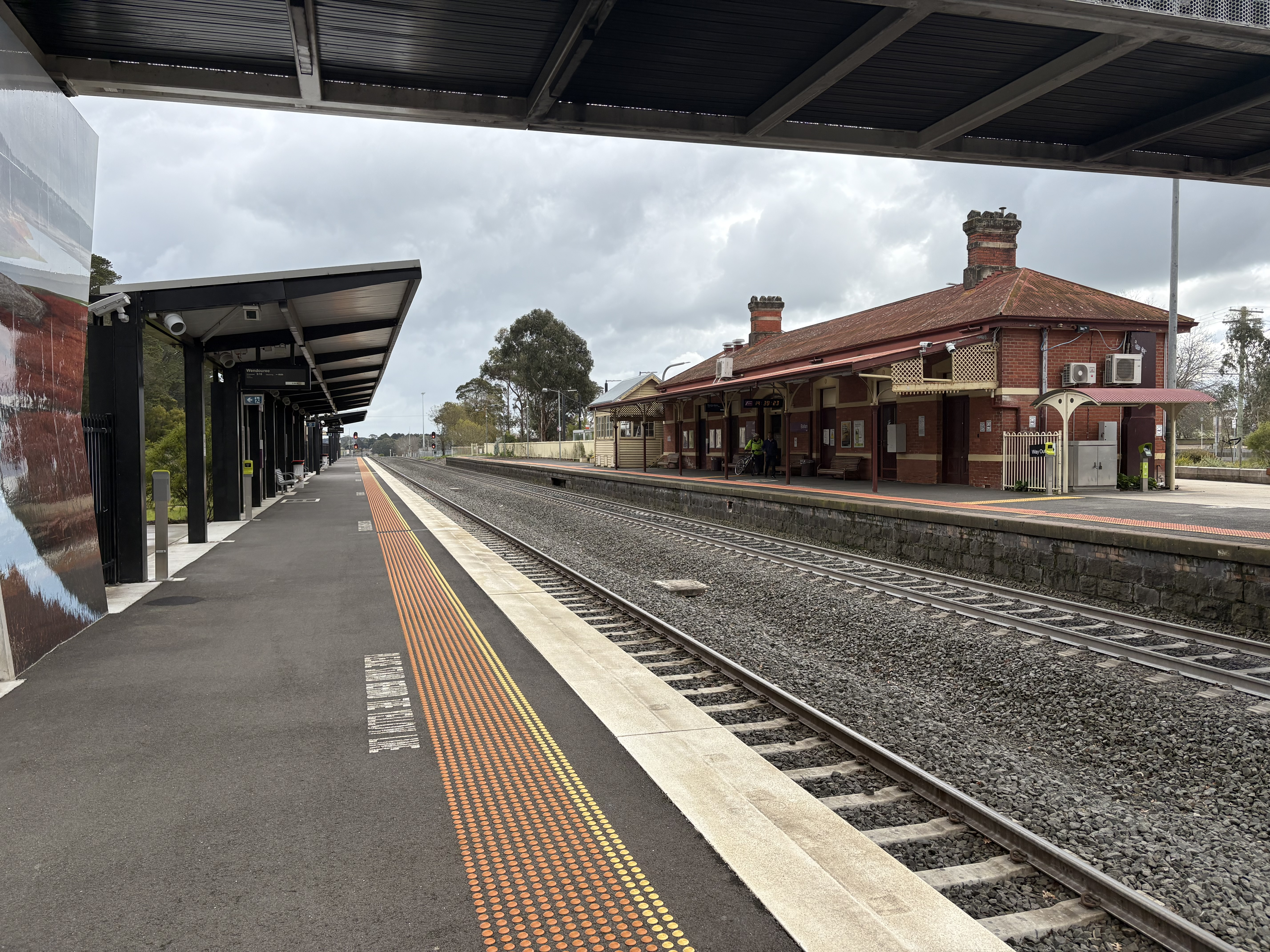
- Westbound overview of the station platforms, September 2025

General information
- Location: Atkinson Street, Ballan, Victoria 3342; Shire of Moorabool; Australia
- Coordinates: 37.6041°S 144.2254°E
- System: PTV regional rail station
- Owner: VicTrack
- Operator: V/Line
- Lines: Ballarat Ararat Maryborough (Ararat)
- Distance: 79.48 kilometres from Southern Cross
- Platforms: 2 side
- Tracks: 2
- Connections: Bus; Coach

Construction
- Structure type: Ground
- Parking: Yes
- Cycle facilities: Yes
- Accessible: Yes

Other information
- Status: Operational, staffed
- Station code: BLN
- Fare zone: Myki zone 4/5
- Website: Public Transport Victoria

History
- Opened: 22 December 1886; 139 years ago
- Rebuilt: 31 January 2021 (Regional Rail Revival)

Passengers
- 2013–2014: 84,936
- 2014–2015: 90,335 ▲6.35%
- 2015–2016: 92,311 ▲2.18%
- 2016–2017: 99,743 ▲8.05%
- 2017–2018: Not measured
- 2018–2019: 105,500 ▲5.77%
- 2019–2020: 74,350 ▼29.52%
- 2020–2021: 35,900 ▼51.71%

Services
Preceding station	V/Line	Following station
Bacchus Marsh towards Southern Cross	Ballarat line	Ballarat towards Wendouree
Bacchus Marsh towards Southern Cross	Ararat line	Ballarat towards Ararat
Bacchus Marsh towards Southern Cross	Maryborough line One daily service	Ballarat One-way operation
Location
- Location within Victoria

Ballan railway station is a regional railway station operated by V/Line on the Ararat and Ballarat lines, part of the Victoria rail network. It serves the town of Ballan, in Victoria, Australia. Ballan is a ground-level premium station, featuring two side platforms. The station opened on 22 December 1886, with the current station provided in 2021.

== History ==
Ballan station opened on 22 December 1886 as the terminus of a short line from Ballarat. On 4 December 1889, the line was extended to Bacchus Marsh, meaning that trains could then operate from Melbourne to Ballarat via Ballan. Before the line via Ballan and Bacchus Marsh was constructed, Ballarat was only indirectly linked to Melbourne via the Melbourne-Geelong and Geelong-Ballarat lines.

Being on a single track section, the station served as a crossing loop, with an interlocked signal box erected in 1890. In 1893, a turntable was added and, by 1908, the station had a four road yard, a passenger platform, a goods shed and goods platform.

By 1967, the turntable was removed. In early 1973, a dead-end siding at the up (Spencer Street) end of the station was abolished. During 1987 and 1988, more tracks in the yard were abolished, leaving only the platform road and a loop remaining. Also in 1987 the main building was repainted, lime yellow with lime green trim on three sides. In 1996, the loop was abolished and the signal box closed, meaning that Ballan was no longer available for the crossing of trains.

In 2004, as part of the Regional Fast Rail project, the track at the eastern end of the station was realigned in order to permit an increase in the maximum speeds of trains though the curve. In 2006, the station itself was refurbished, and included an upgrade to the waiting room, new toilets, resurfacing of the platform and new fencing and lighting.

The Victorian State Government's Regional Rail Revival project in 2019 included an additional track and platform at Ballan, which delivered two side platforms, an accessible pedestrian overpass and improved parking. By January 2021, most of these works were completed.

Closed stations Ingliston and Rowsley were located between Ballan and Bacchus Marsh. Between Ballan and Ballarat, closed stations include Gordon, Millbrook, Wallace, Bungaree, Warrenheip and Ballarat East.

== Platforms and services ==
Ballan has two side platforms. It is serviced by V/Line Ballarat and Ararat line services.

Ballan platform arrangement
Platform	Line	Destination	Service Type
1	Ballarat line Ararat line Maryborough line	Southern Cross	Maryborough line: One daily V/Line service
2	Ballarat line Ararat line	Wendouree, Ararat	

== Transport links ==
Bacchus Marsh Coaches operates two routes via Ballan station, under contract to Public Transport Victoria:

- to Hepburn
- Ballan – Mount Egerton

V/Line also operates a road coach via Ballan station to Melbourne and Ballarat.
