= Rowsley railway station, Victoria =

Former railway station in Victoria, Australia

Rowsley

General information
- Location: Australia
- Owner: VicTrack
- Line: Serviceton railway line
- Platforms: 0, formerly 1

Other information
- Status: Demolished

History
- Opened: 1889

Services
Preceding station	Disused railways	Following station
Bank Box	Serviceton line	Maddingley Racecourse
	List of closed railway stations in Victoria	

Rowsley railway station was a railway station on the Serviceton railway line. It was opened in 1889 when the track was laid through the small town of Rowsley, Victoria. A siding replaced the station in 1959. It was once the location of a branch line to Maddingley Mine.

== 1934 Royal train ==
The station was not generally used to allow trains to pass in opposite directions. The one occasion where a "cross" was scheduled was for the Royal Train on 27 October 1934, when the pilot locomotive running ahead of the special train was timed to cross a regular Up Serviceton train at Rowsley.

To make this possible all goods wagons at Rowsley had to be cleared out of the yard in advance. The pilot engine was scheduled to wait for 24 minutes, and the Royal train waited a similar length of time in the vicinity of the modern era Caroline Springs railway station, to make room on the single line for regular services to operate. Special arrangements had to be made to ensure that other trains would not try to occupy the sections between Parwan, Bacchus Marsh and Ingliston until the pilot locomotive was safely locked away in the loop track at Rowsley, due to the steep gradients of the line, and to ensure that the Royal train could not leave Parwan until the Serviceton train had arrived at Bacchus Marsh. To complicate operations further an additional "emergency engine" was also supplied, running ahead of the Pilot to Bacchus Marsh then following the Royal Train and a rescheduled Mildura service to Ballarat.

To achieve the switching-in of Rowsley as a crossing station the through Electric Staff for the section Bacchus Marsh - Ingliston was extracted and locked away to prevent use, thus releasing two Ordinary Train Staffs for the sections Bacchus Marsh - Rowsley and Rowsley - Ingliston. Rowsley was open as a crossing station on that day from 4:30 pm until shortly after 9 pm. Between Rowsley and Ingliston, Bank Box was also used as a telephone block post to permit the close operation of the Pilot engine, then the Royal train, the Mildura service and finally the emergency engine, all four passing Ingliston within a 1hr6min period.

The emergency engine had been A^{2}909, the pilot was A^{2}896 hauling Carey, two AW's and a CW; the Royal train was worked by A^{2}978 and A^{2}993 hauling Loddon, Dargo, Goulburn, Pekina, Avoca, No.4 State Car, Norman, and 19CE.
