= Ardeer railway station =

Railway station in Melbourne, Australia

Ardeer
- Westbound view from Platform 1, September 2026

General information
- Location: Forest Street, Ardeer, Victoria 3022; City of Brimbank; Australia
- Coordinates: 37°46′59″S 144°48′04″E
- System: PTV regional rail station
- Owner: VicTrack
- Operator: V/Line
- Lines: Ballarat Ararat Maryborough (Ararat)
- Distance: 15.05 kilometres from Southern Cross
- Platforms: 2 (1 island)
- Tracks: 2
- Connections: Bus

Construction
- Structure type: Ground
- Parking: Yes
- Accessible: Yes

Other information
- Status: Operational, unstaffed
- Station code: ADR
- Fare zone: Myki Zone 2
- Website: Public Transport Victoria

History
- Opened: 2 April 1929; 97 years ago
- Closed: 28 August 1956
- Rebuilt: 2 May 1977

Passengers
- 2013–2014: 18,339
- 2014–2015: 18,833 ▲2.69%
- 2015–2016: 37,206 ▲97.55%
- 2016–2017: 45,850 ▲23.23%
- 2017–2018: Not measured
- 2018–2019: 53,500 ▲16.68%
- 2019–2020: 46,100 ▼13.83%
- 2020–2021: 23,050 ▼50%

Services
Preceding station	V/Line	Following station
Sunshine towards Southern Cross	Melton line	Deer Park towards Melton, Ballarat, Ararat or Maryborough
Sunshine towards Southern Cross	Ballarat line	Deer Park towards Melton, Ballarat, Ararat or Maryborough
Sunshine towards Southern Cross	Ararat line	Deer Park towards Melton, Ballarat, Ararat or Maryborough
Sunshine towards Southern Cross	Maryborough line	Deer Park towards Melton, Ballarat, Ararat or Maryborough
Geelong line does not stop here
Track layout
Location

Ardeer railway station is a regional railway station on the Ararat line, part of the Victorian railway network. It serves the western suburb of Ardeer, in Melbourne, Victoria, Australia. Ardeer station is a ground level unstaffed station, featuring an island platform with two sides. It opened on 2 April 1929, with the current station provided in 1977. It was originally closed on 28 August 1956, then was reopened on 2 May 1977.

== History ==
=== 1903-1956 ===
In 1903, the Australian Explosives and Chemical Company Siding was provided on the north side of the line, near what would become the site of Ardeer station. In 1910, a connection to the siding was added at the Melbourne (up) end, converting it into a loop, and it was renamed the Federal Manure Siding. In 1929, it was renamed again as Nobel (Australasia) Pty Ltd Chemical Siding.

On 2 April 1929, the station opened, coinciding with the introduction of a passenger service for factory workers at Ardeer and Deer Park. The loop siding was to the east of the former Fitzgerald Road level crossing, and the platform was to the west of it, on the north side of the line. In 1934, it was renamed Ardeer Siding. On 28 August 1956, the station was closed and the passenger platform removed.

=== 1976-present ===
In 1976, the line through the section of the former station was duplicated from Sunshine to Deer Park West Junction. On 2 May 1977, the current Ardeer station opened, with an island platform being provided at the up end of the existing siding, about 800 metres further east than the former station. In 1981, the Nobel (Australasia) Pty Ltd Siding was renamed ICI Australia Operations Pty Ltd Siding and, in 1990, was abolished.

As part of the Regional Rail Link project, the station underwent a minor platform upgrade. Noise walls were also installed along the corridor, and safety gates were provided at nearby pedestrian crossings.

First announced by the Andrews State Government in 2018, the station is set to be integrated into the metropolitan railway network, as part of the Western Rail Plan.

== Platforms and services ==
Ardeer has one island platform with two faces. It is served by V/Line Ballarat and Ararat line trains.

Ardeer platform arrangement
Platform	Line	Destination	Service Type
1	Ballarat line Ararat line Maryborough line	Southern Cross	Maryborough line: One daily V/Line service
2	Ballarat line Ararat line	Melton, Bacchus Marsh, Wendouree, Ararat	

== Transport links ==
CDC Melbourne operates one bus route via Ardeer station, under contract to Public Transport Victoria:

- 400 : Sunshine station – Laverton station (shared with Transit Systems Victoria)

Transit Systems Victoria operates three bus routes via Ardeer station, under contract to Public Transport Victoria:

- 400 : Sunshine station – Laverton station (shared with CDC Melbourne)
- 422 : Sunshine station – Brimbank Central Shopping Centre
- 427 : Sunshine station – Sunshine West

== Gallery ==
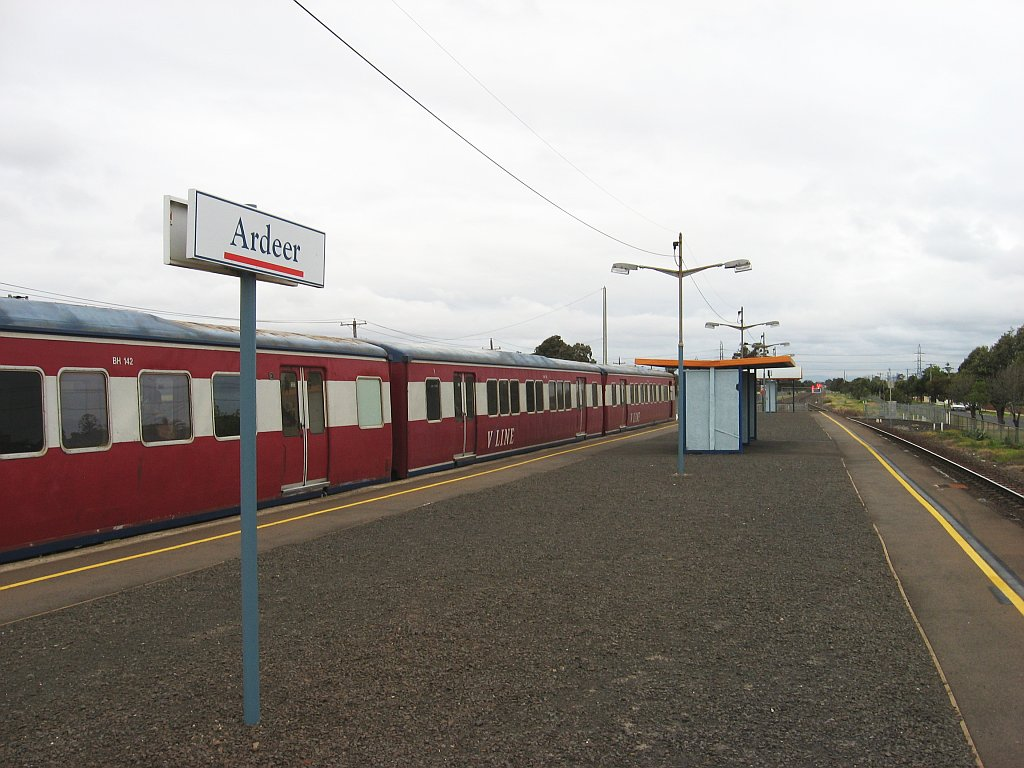
Eastbound view from Platform 2, September 2007

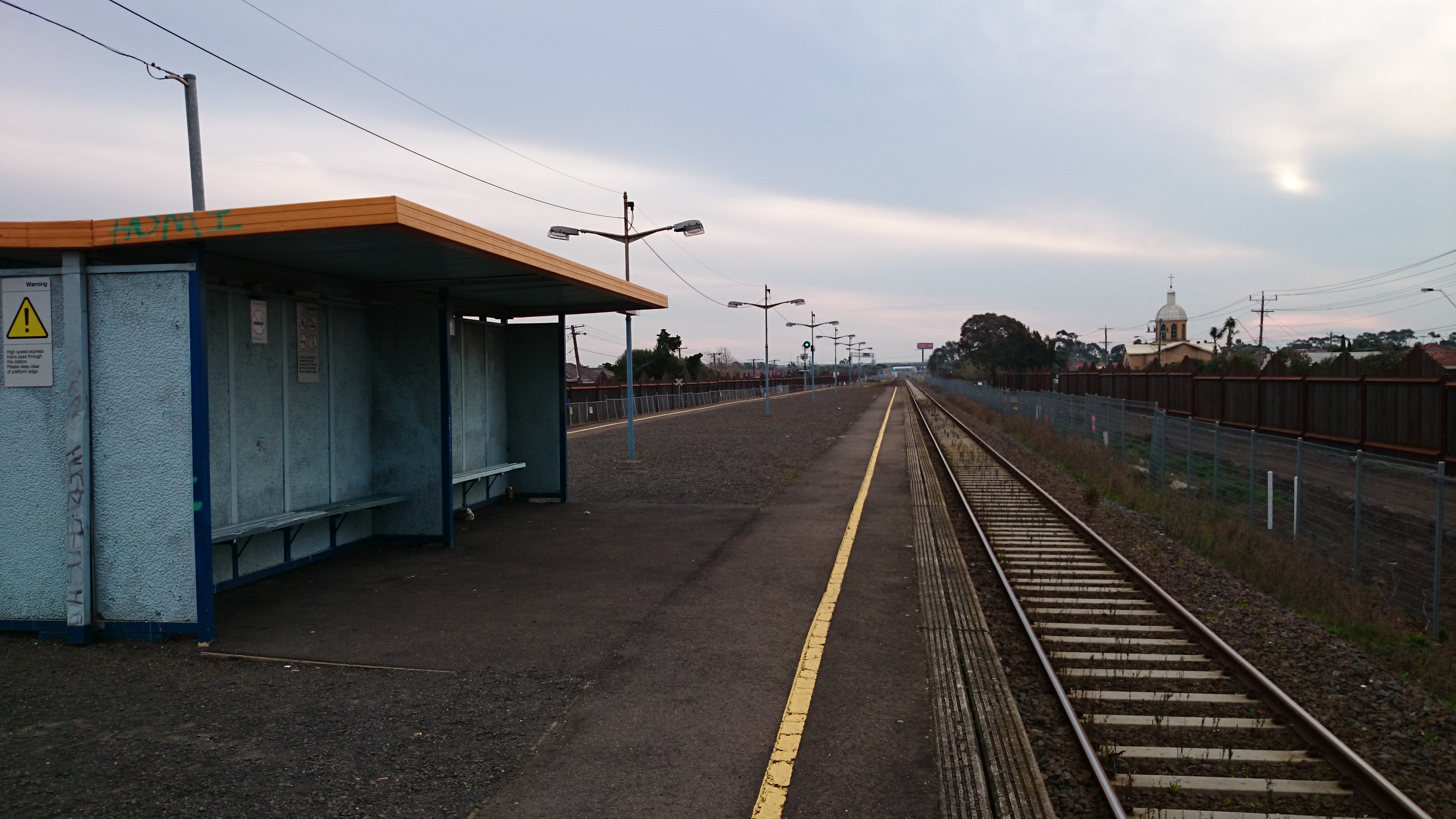
Westbound view from Platform 1, August 2014
