= Ballarat line =

Passenger rail service in Victoria, Australia

Ballarat

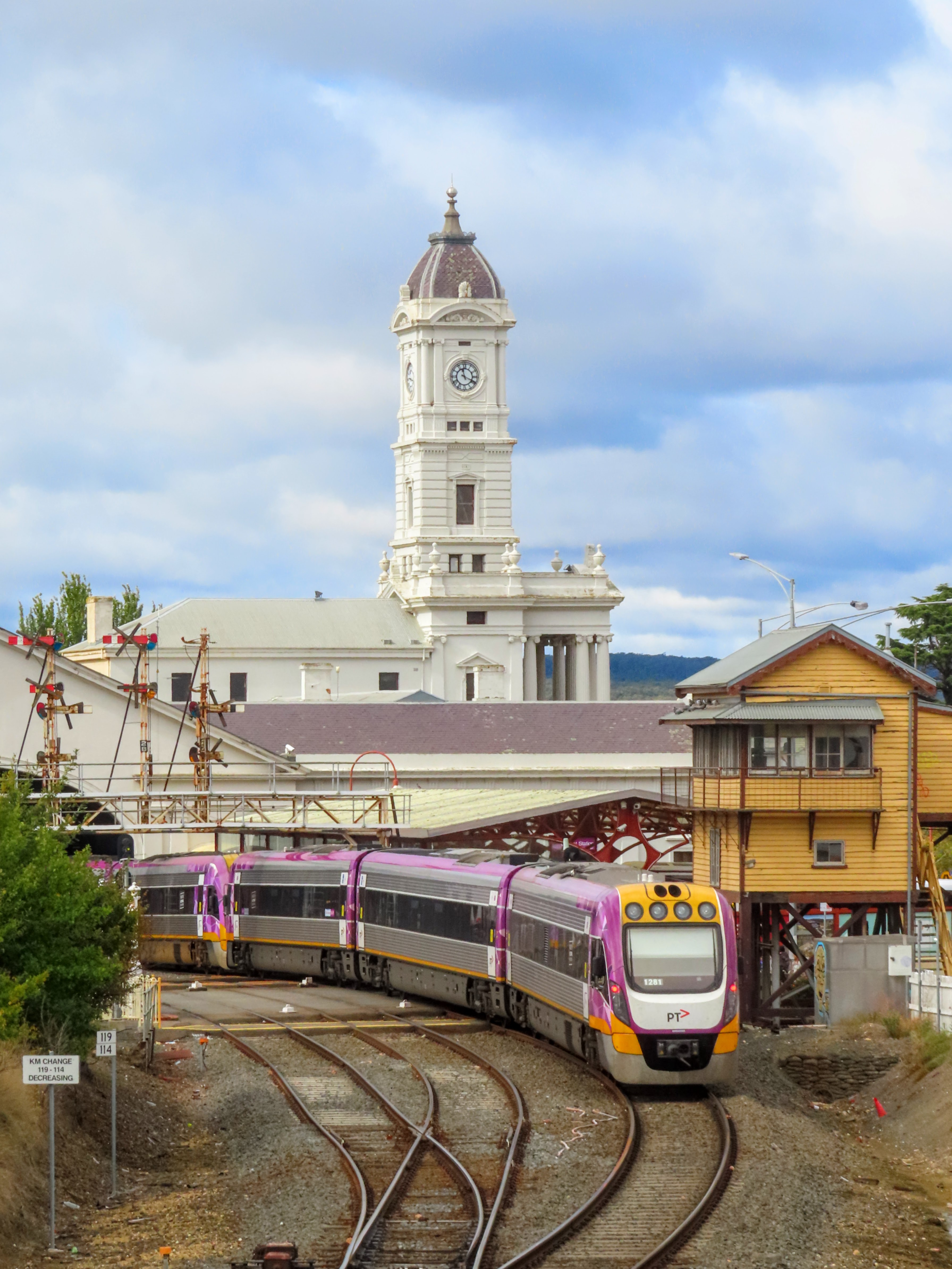
- VLocity VL81 arriving into Ballarat

Overview
- Service type: Passenger service
- Status: Operating
- Locale: Victoria, Australia
- Current operator: V/Line
- Former operator: Victorian Railways
- Ridership: 4.68 million (2022–23)
- Website: V/Line Ballarat on X

Route
- Termini: Southern Cross: Melton; Bacchus Marsh; Wendouree
- Stops: 13
- Distance travelled: 123 km (76 mi)
- Service frequency: Weekday services between Southern Cross and Melton run approx. every 20 minutes; Weekday services between Southern Cross and Wendouree run approx. every 40 minutes; Extra services to Southern Cross originate from Bacchus Marsh during the weekday morning peak; Weekend services run approx. once an hour between Southern Cross and Wendouree

On-board services
- Class: Economy

Technical
- Rolling stock: VLocity
- Track gauge: 1,600 mm (5 ft 3 in)
- Operating speed: 160 km/h (99 mph) maximum
- Track owner: VicTrack

Ararat

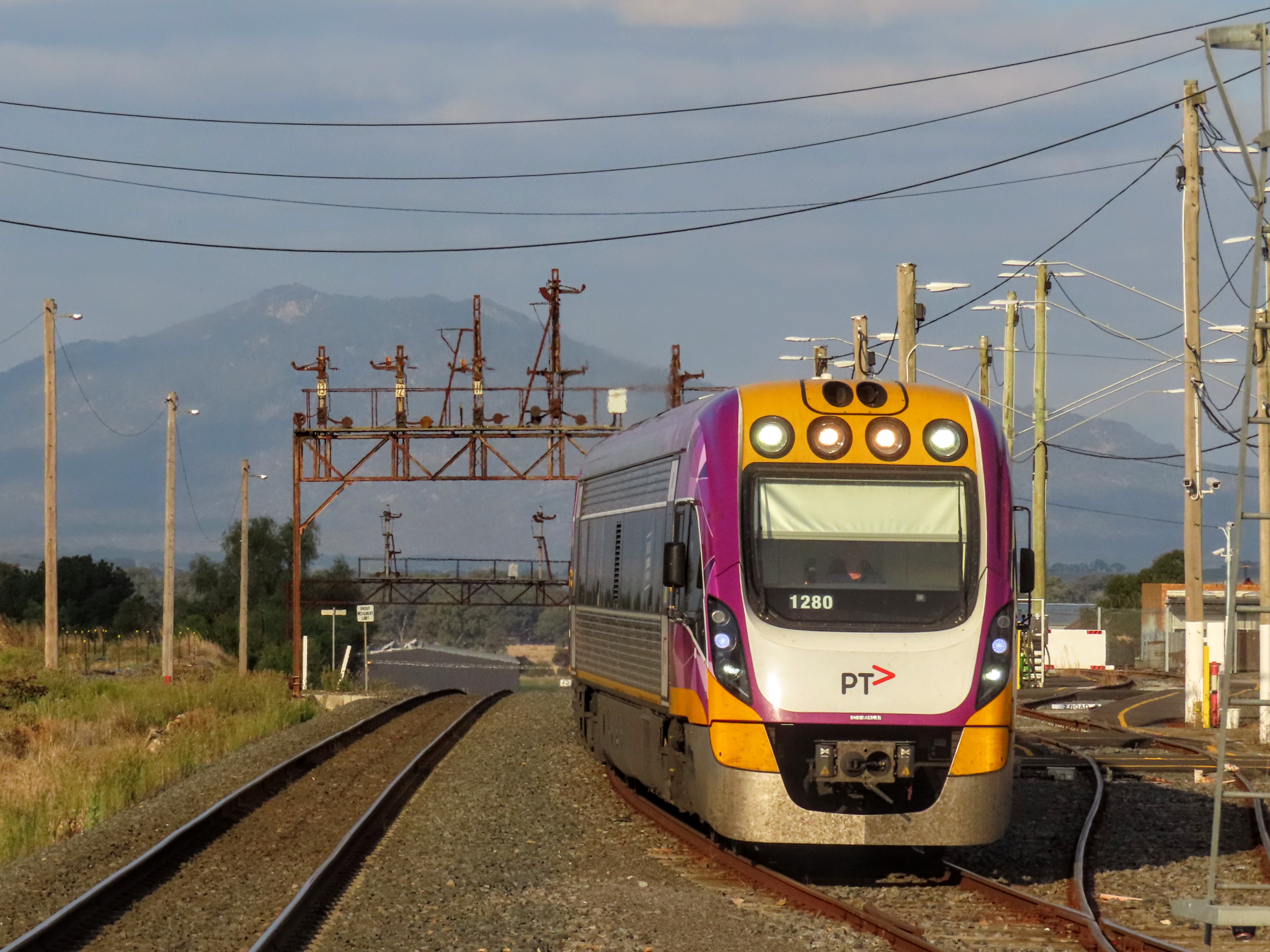
- VLocity VL80 arriving into Ararat

Overview
- Service type: Long-distance (paper ticket) service
- Status: Operating
- Locale: Victoria, Australia

Route
- Termini: Southern Cross; Ararat
- Stops: 15
- Distance travelled: 211 km (131 mi)
- Average journey time: 2h 30min (approx)
- Service frequency: 5 weekday return services, 3 weekend return services

On-board services
- Class: Economy

Technical
- Rolling stock: VLocity

Maryborough

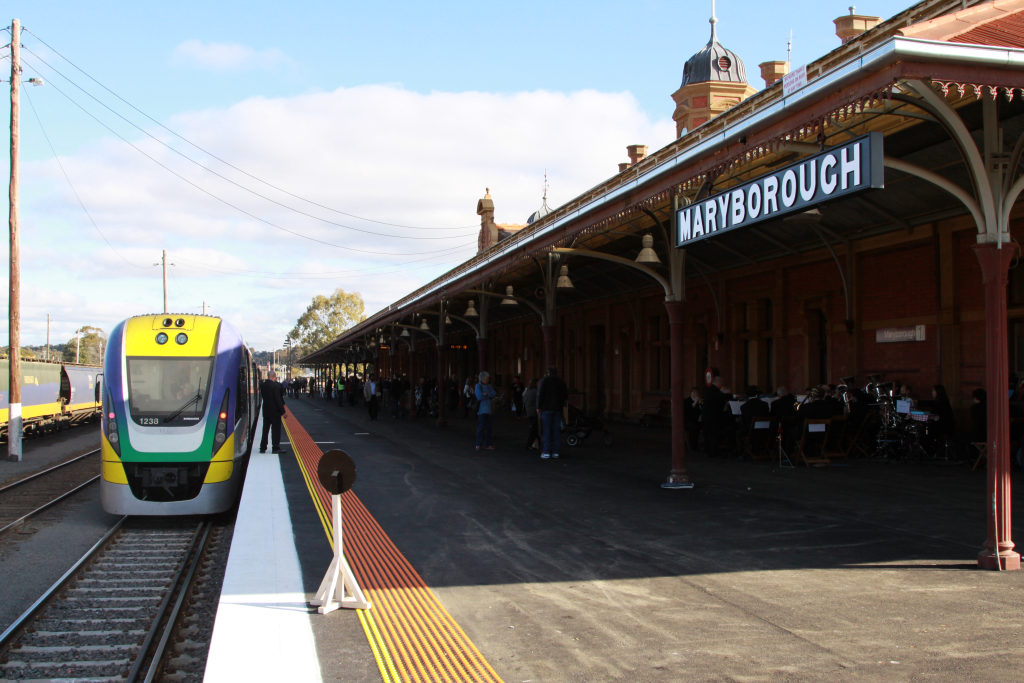
- VLocity VL38 at Maryborough

Overview
- Service type: Long-distance (paper ticket) service
- Status: Operational
- Locale: Victoria, Australia
- First service: 24 July 2010; 16 years ago
- Current operator: V/Line
- Former operator: Victorian Railways (to Mildura)

Route
- Termini: Ballarat; Maryborough
- Stops: 5
- Distance travelled: 68.7 km (42.7 mi)
- Average journey time: 52 minutes
- Service frequency: Two return services per day
- Line used: Mildura

On-board services
- Class: Economy
- Disabled access: Yes

Technical
- Rolling stock: VLocity
- Track gauge: 1,600 mm (5 ft 3 in)
- Track owner: VicTrack

Melton

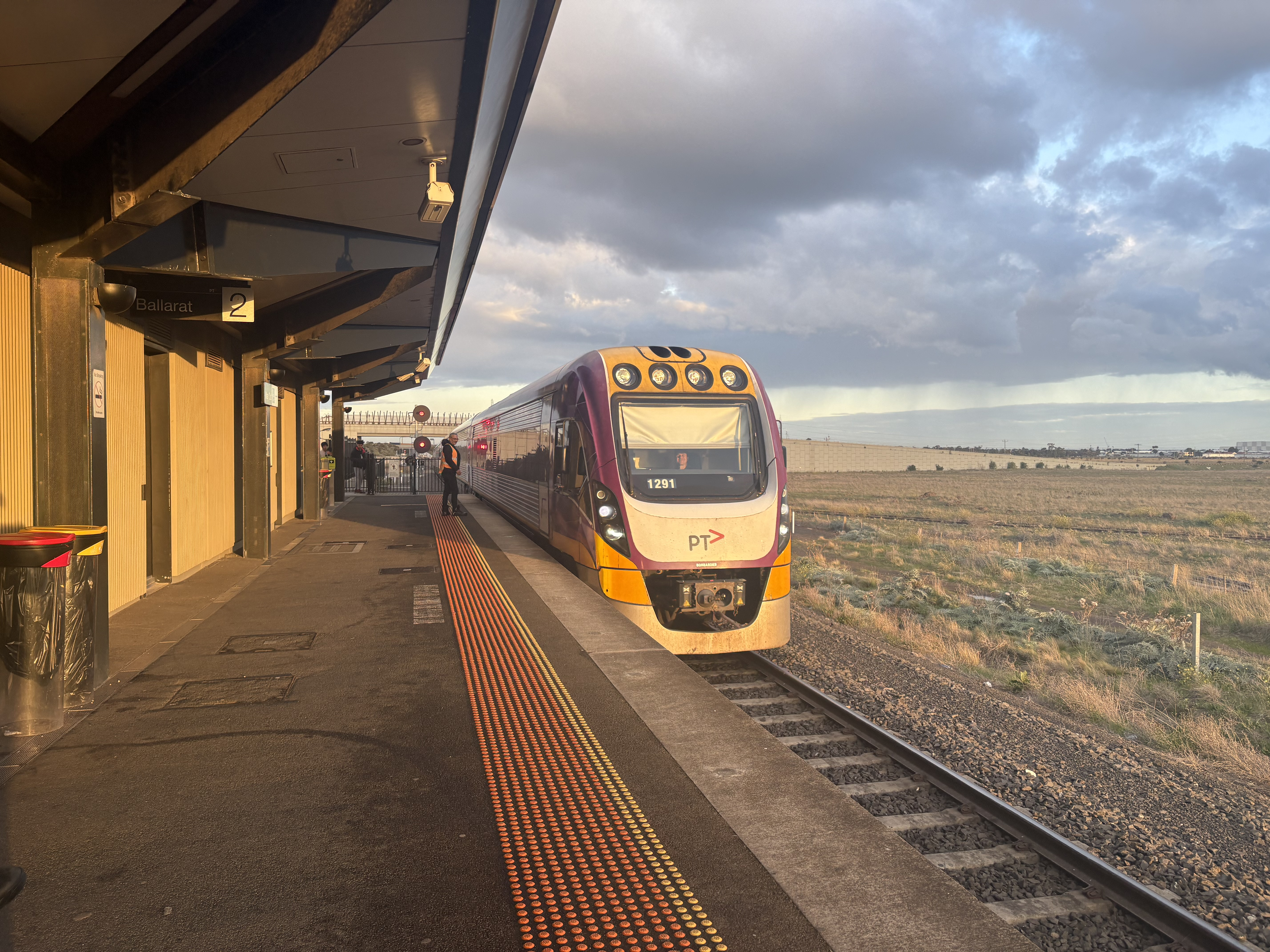
- VLocity VL91 arriving into Caroline Springs

Overview
- Service type: Passenger service
- Status: Operating
- Locale: Victoria, Australia
- Current operator: V/Line
- Former operator: Victorian Railways
- Ridership: 4.68 million (2022–23)
- Website: V/Line Ballarat on X

Route
- Termini: Southern Cross; Melton
- Stops: 9
- Distance travelled: 37 km (23 mi)
- Service frequency: Weekday services between Southern Cross and Melton run approx. every 20 minutes with every second service continuing to Ballarat; Weekend services run approx. once every 40 minutes between Southern Cross and Wendouree

On-board services
- Class: Economy

Technical
- Rolling stock: VLocity
- Track gauge: 1,600 mm (5 ft 3 in)
- Operating speed: 160 km/h (99 mph) maximum
- Track owner: VicTrack

The Ballarat line is a regional passenger rail service operated by V/Line in Victoria, Australia. It serves 13 stations towards its terminus in Ballarat's western suburb of Wendouree via Melton and Bacchus Marsh. Services are operated primarily using V/Line VLocity diesel multiple unit sets in either 3- or 6-car configurations.

It is the second most-used regional rail service in Victoria (behind the Geelong line), carrying 4.68 million passengers in the 2022-23 financial year.

The Ararat line extends further west from Wendouree to Ararat, while the Maryborough line is operated primarily as a shuttle from Ballarat along the Mildura line to Maryborough.

== History ==
=== 20th century ===
V/Line operated services along the original Serviceton railway line as far as Horsham and Dimboola. Several stations, including Gordon and Warrenheip, were closed in 1981 as part of the New Deal reforms to Victoria's country rail services. Services to Mildura, which ran via Ballarat, ended in 1993.

In 1994, all services beyond Ballarat were withdrawn to allow for conversion of the line between Ararat and Serviceton from broad gauge to standard gauge. The now-standard gauge track was connected to other former-broad gauge lines to become the Western standard gauge railway line.

=== 21st century ===
In 2004, services to Ararat were reintroduced under then-Premier Steve Bracks' Linking Victoria program. Bracks' government additionally announced its intention to rename the line to "Eureka" in commemoration of the Eureka uprising's 150th anniversary. This renaming was to take effect at the same time as the renaming of Spencer Street Station to Southern Cross Station in 2005, however this move was never carried out.

==== Regional Fast Rail ====
The line saw a significant package of upgrades during the Regional Fast Rail project. Several parts of the line were rerailed, and new deviations and bridges were built to ease grades, enabling trains to run at speeds up to 160 km/h. V/Line VLocity diesel multiple unit trains, built as part of the project, started running to Ballarat in 2005.

In 2008, Wendouree Station was built to relieve overcrowding after passenger numbers grew significantly following the completion of the project. The station opened in 2009.

==== Introduction of Maryborough services ====
In December 2008 as part of the Victorian Transport Plan the state government announced that V/Line rail passenger services would be extended from Ballarat to Maryborough station at a cost of $50 million, commencing 25 July 2010. Initially Creswick was to be the only intermediate station, until June 2010 when the government announced $7 million in funding to also reopen Clunes. Talbot also reopened in December 2013.

Two services on weekdays and one service on weekends in each direction operate as a shuttle between Maryborough and Ballarat, stopping at all operating stations. At Ballarat, all terminating services connect to an Ararat or Ballarat service towards Melbourne, and all originating services bound for Maryborough connect to a service from Melbourne.

==== Regional Rail Link ====
In 2008 the Regional Rail Link project was announced, consisting of a new pair of tracks exclusively for V/Line services, avoiding the need to share tracks with Metro's electrified suburban services. The tracks begin west of Werribee, following an alignment up to Deer Park, then running into two new platforms at Southern Cross, completely bypassing Tottenham, West Footscray, Middle Footscray, South Kensington, and North Melbourne; but still stopping at Sunshine and Footscray at two platforms dedicated to V/Line services.

The main benefit of the project was for the Geelong line service, which used to run along the same tracks as Metro's Werribee line, resulting in significant congestion. Ballarat and especially Bendigo services benefited less, only being separated from Metro's Sunbury line service between Sunshine and Southern Cross. While the project was overall well-received for increasing service reliability, the choice to bypass North Melbourne was especially criticised.

==== Caroline Springs Station ====
Construction of Caroline Springs Station, between Deer Park and Rockbank, commenced in 2015. The station opened in 2017 to serve new housing developments in the area.

==== Regional Rail Revival ====
The line received another significant package of works as part of the Regional Rail Revival project, beginning in early 2018 with major construction completed in 2021. The project, with a budget of $518 million, saw the duplication of 17 kilometres (11 mi) of track between Deer Park and Melton; a new station constructed at Cobblebank; upgrades to Rockbank, Bacchus Marsh and Ballan stations; a new stabling facility built in Maddingley, and a new passing loop at Millbrook. These works enabled substantially more services to run, particularly in the duplicated section up to Melton. The new loop at Millbrook allowed for the closure of the Bungaree loop, originally a part of the main line before a deviation was built away from it as part of the previous Regional Fast Rail project.

==== Level Crossing Removal Project ====
In 2022 and 2023, three level crossings were removed in Deer Park and Ardeer to make the line level crossing-free between Deer Park and Southern Cross. An additional four level crossings are currently being removed in Melton and Truganina, with Melton Station being rebuilt.

== Future ==
Several upgrades are planned for the future. 9-car VLocity trains will be introduced up to Melton by 2027. Electrification of the line up to Melton is planned to occur after a package of upgrades to Sunshine Station begin in 2026; these works additionally include partial quadruplication to separate the future electrified Melton service from the regional service.

As part of Victoria's Big Build Rail project, the Melton line between Sunshine and Melton is proposed to be electrified and upgraded. The project is proposed to be built after the Sunshine station superhub and the completion of the Melton level crossing removal project and will replace service at Ardeer, Deer Park, Caroline Springs, Rockbank, Cobblebank and Melton with electric suburban services to the Metro Tunnel. The project will also see the construction of an additional track pair between Sunshine and Caroline Springs to separate V/Line services from suburban services.

== Services ==
The current V/Line timetable has weekday services operating approximately every 20 minutes between Melton and Southern Cross; and every 40 minutes between Wendouree and Southern Cross. On weekends, services are operated every 40 minutes, with all trains running the full route to/from Wendouree and stopping all stations.

Five return services per weekday, and three per weekend, extend from Wendouree to Ararat. Two return services run between Southern Cross and Maryborough every day.

=== Rolling stock ===
All regular passenger services on the line are operated with V/Line VLocity diesel multiple unit trains, running in sets of either 3 or 6 cars. As of the Network Service Plan released on 13 April 2025, the classic N class locomotives have been completely retired from regular passenger services on the line.

=== Stopping patterns ===
Legend – Station status

- ◼ Premium station – Station staffed from first to last train
- ◻ Host station – Usually staffed during morning peak, however this can vary for different stations on the network.

Legend – Stopping patterns

- ● – All trains stop
- ◐ – Some services do not stop
- ▲ – Only inbound trains stop
- ▼ – Only outbound trains stop
- | – Trains pass and do not stop

Ballarat Services
Station	Local	Express	Ballarat	Bacchus Marsh	Melton
◼ Southern Cross	●	●	●	●	●
◼ Footscray	●	●	●	●	●
◼ Sunshine	●	◐	●	●	●
Ardeer	●	I	●	●	●
Deer Park	●	I	●	●	●
◼ Caroline Springs	●	I	●	●	●
Rockbank	●	◐	●	●	●
◻ Cobblebank	●	I	●	●	●
◼ Melton	●	◐	●	●	●
◼ Bacchus Marsh	●	●	●	●	
◻ Ballan	●	●	●		
◼ Ballarat	●	●	●		
◼ Wendouree	●	●			

== Infrastructure ==
The rail line is double track between Southern Cross and Melton. The rest of the line is single track, with the following crossing loops presently in use:

- Parwan loop, between Melton and Bacchus Marsh
- Rowsley loop, between Bacchus Marsh and the Bank Box loop
- Bank Box loop, between the Rowsley loop and Ballan
- Millbrook loop, between Ballan and Ballarat

The line is able to run up to 160 km/h between Southern Cross and Wendouree, with speeds reduced to 115 km/h on some sections towards Ararat. The section of the Mildura line used by the Maryborough service is between 80 - 100 km/h.

The V/Line service previously used the original line via Bungaree as a long crossing loop between Ballan and Ballarat until December 2020. The loop was used in conjunction with the new deviation built in 2005 as part of the Regional Fast Rail project.

== Gallery ==
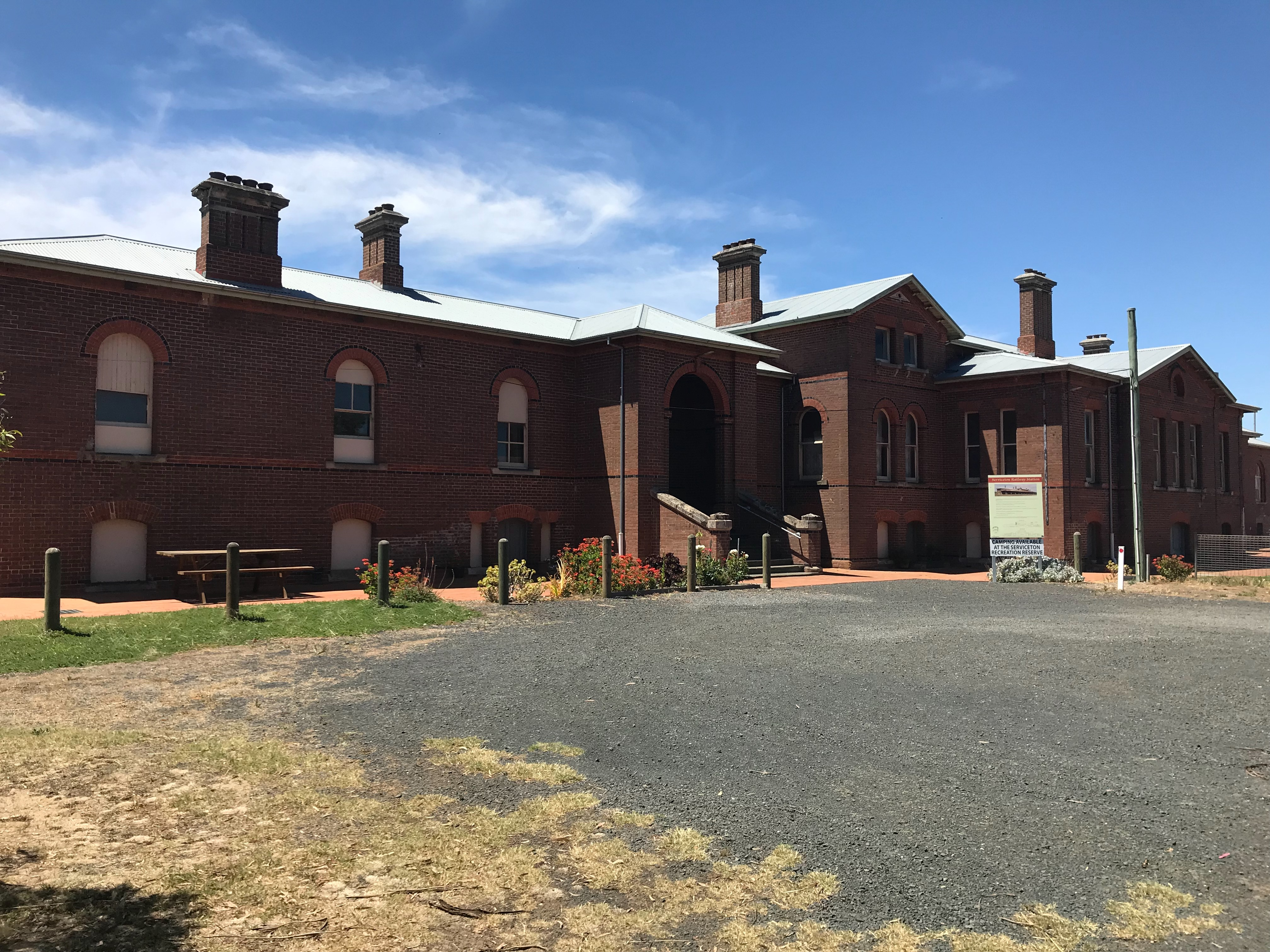
Serviceton railway station, the original terminus of the line before it was truncated to Ararat

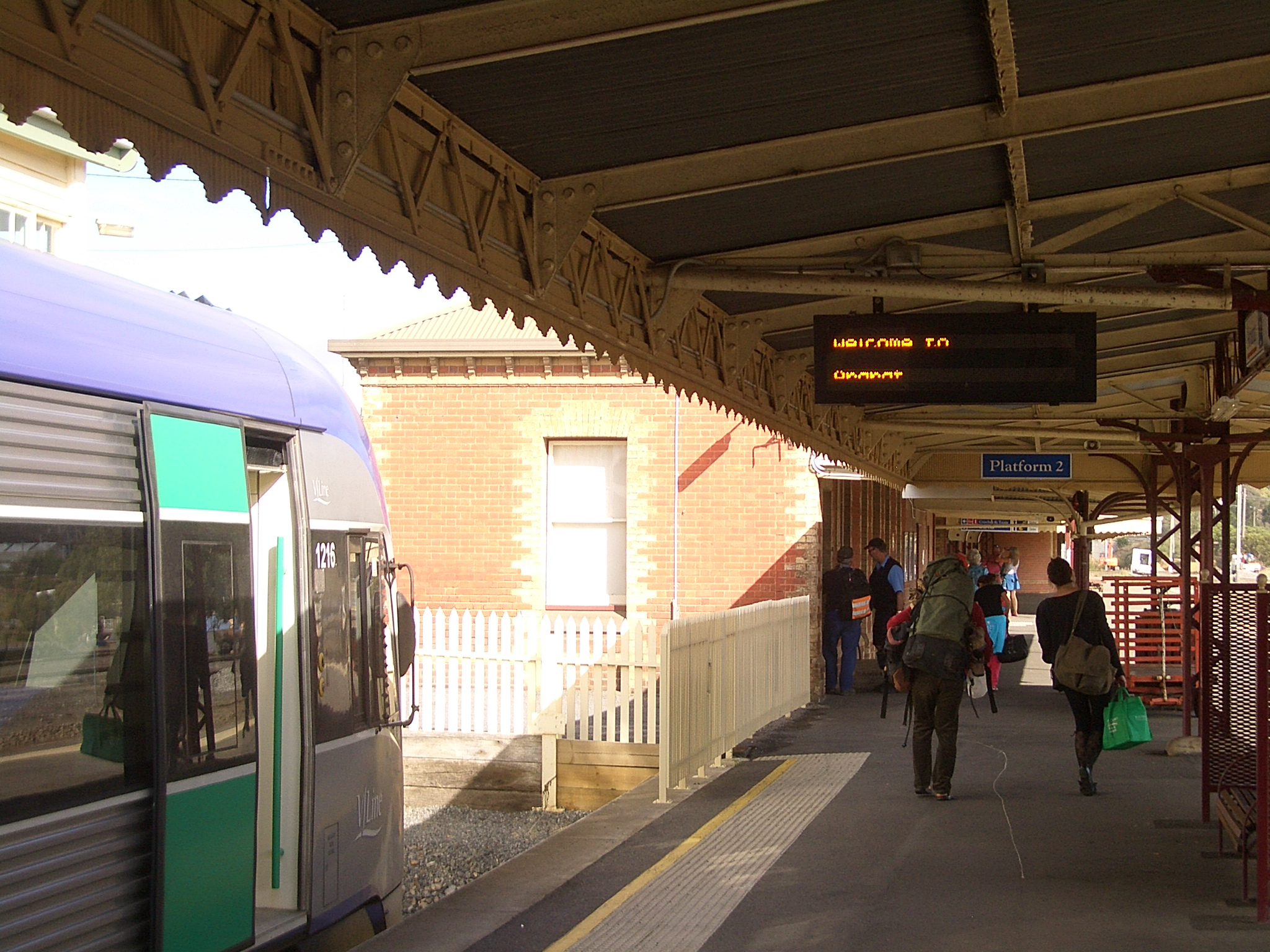
Passengers leaving a train at Ararat, 2008

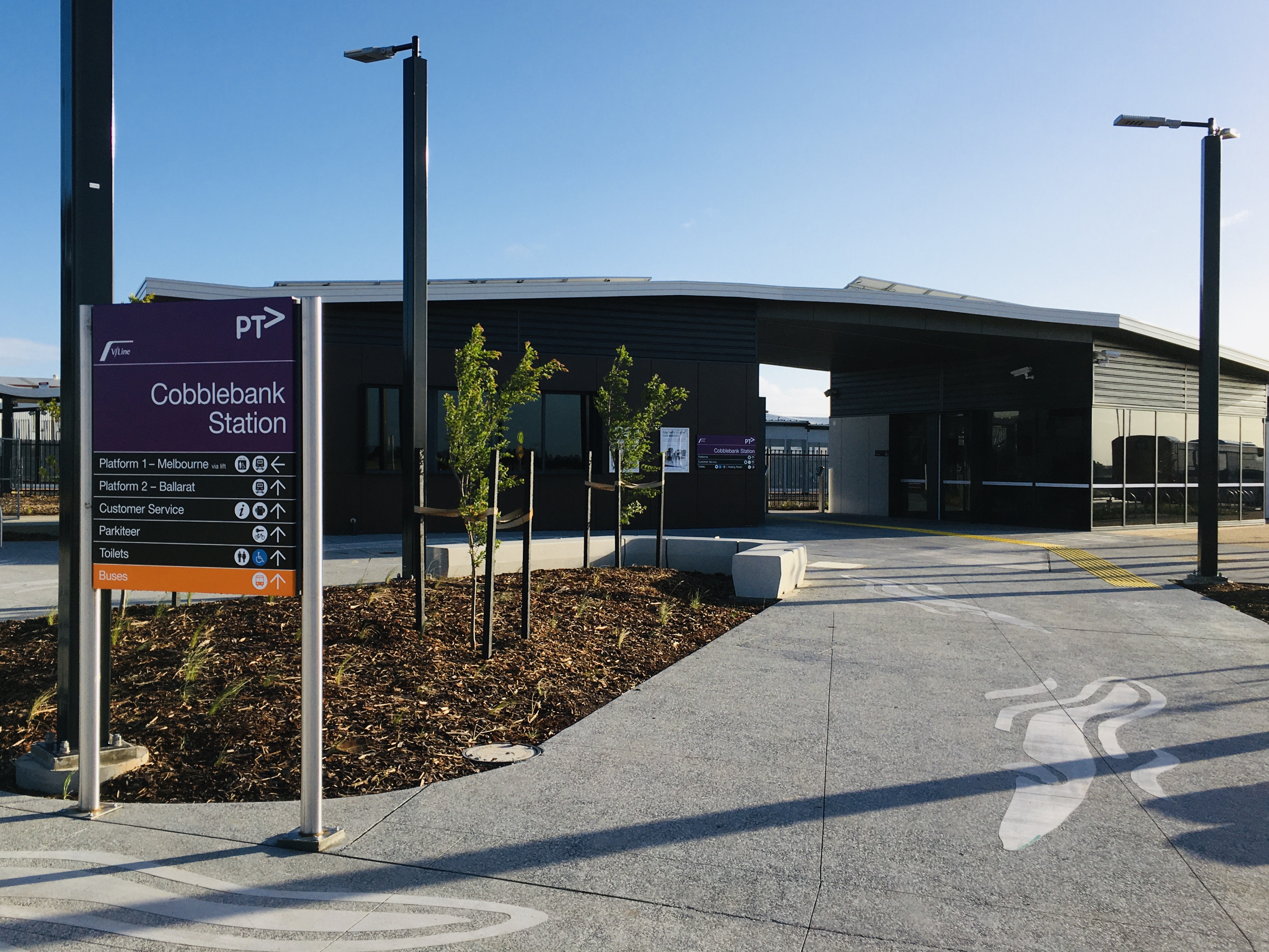
Cobblebank railway station opened in 2019

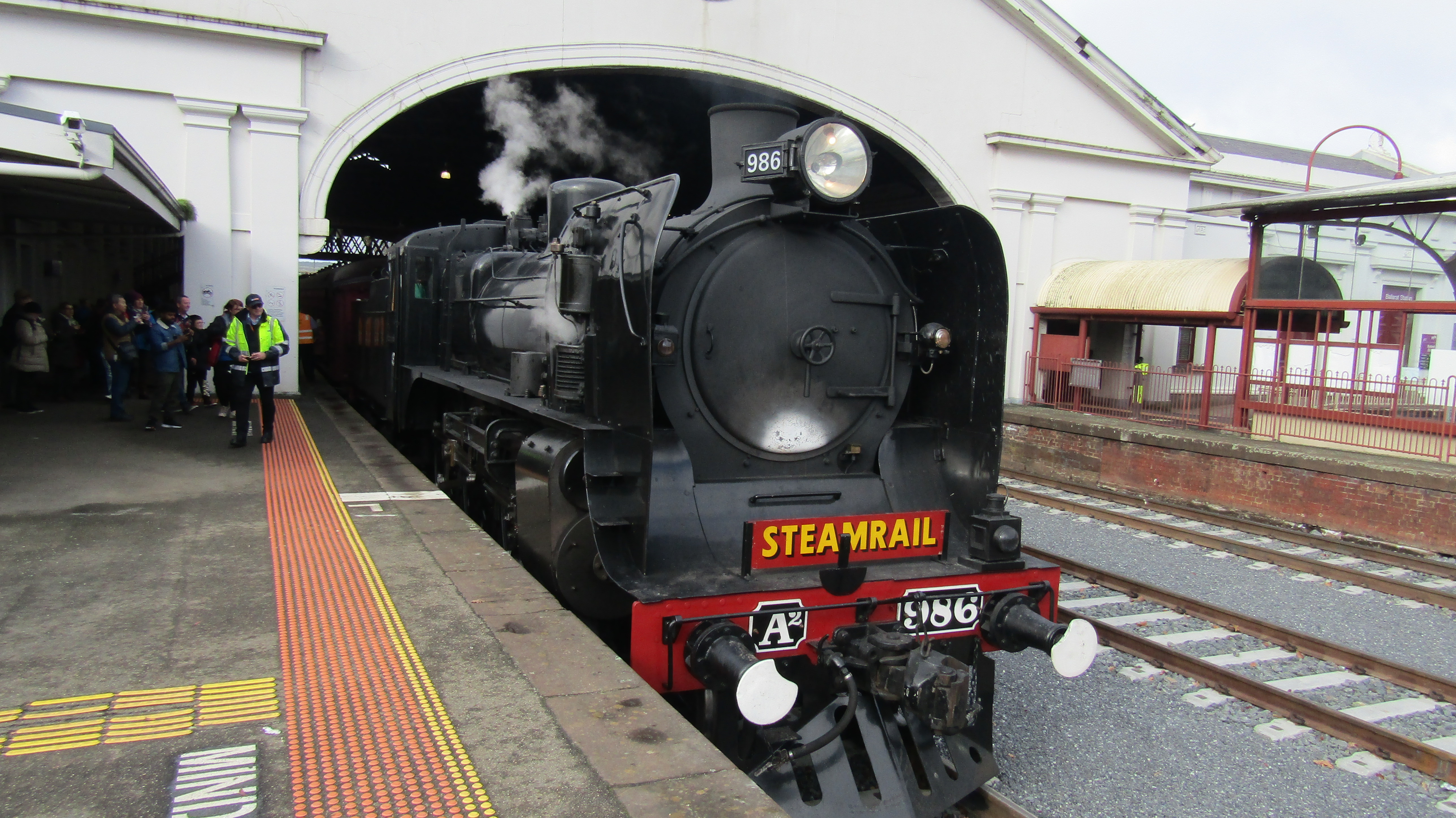
Steam train at Ballarat, operated by non-profit preservation group Steamrail Victoria
