= BLN =

BLN may refer to:

- Ballan railway station, Australia
- Ballygunge Junction railway station, in Kolkata
- Bellefonte Nuclear Plant, an unfinished nuclear power plant in Hollywood, Alabama
- UCI team code of Team BridgeLane, an Australian UCI Continental road cycling team
- IATA code of Benalla Airport, east of Benalla, Victoria, Australia
- bln, common abbreviation for billion
