= Bacchus Marsh railway station =

Railway station in Victoria, Australia

Bacchus Marsh
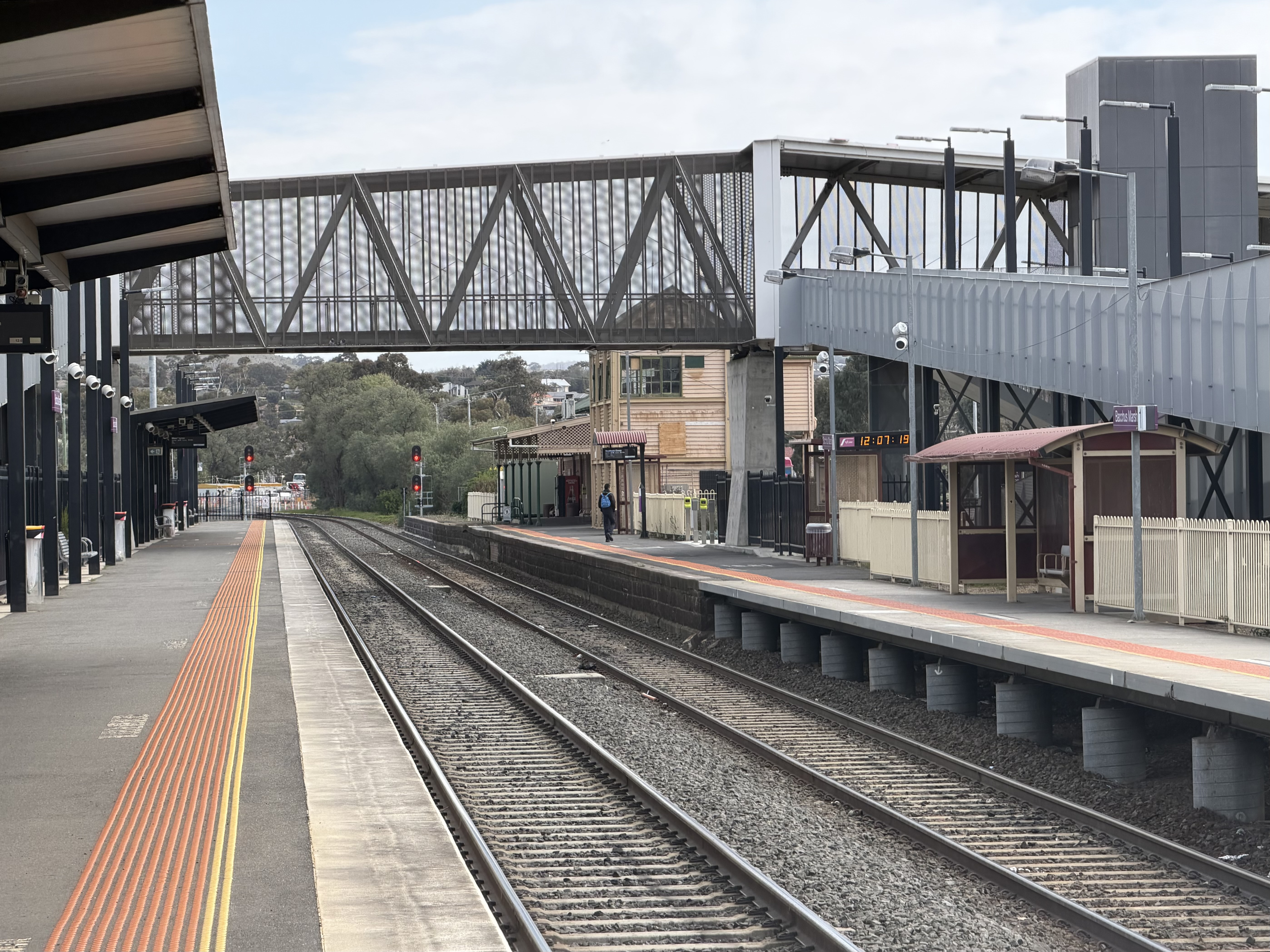
- Westbound view from Platform 2, September 2026

General information
- Location: Station Street, Maddingley, Victoria 3338; Shire of Moorabool; Australia
- Coordinates: 37°41′15″S 144°26′13″E
- Elevation: 105 metres (343 ft)
- System: PTV regional rail station
- Owner: VicTrack
- Operator: V/Line
- Lines: Ballarat Ararat Maryborough (Ararat)
- Distance: 50.86 kilometres from Southern Cross
- Platforms: 2 side
- Tracks: 2
- Connections: Bus

Construction
- Structure type: Ground
- Parking: Yes
- Cycle facilities: Yes
- Accessible: Yes

Other information
- Status: Operational, staffed
- Station code: BMH
- Fare zone: Myki zone 2/3
- Website: Public Transport Victoria

History
- Opened: 10 February 1887; 139 years ago
- Rebuilt: 2019 (extra platform added, Regional Rail Revival)

Passengers
- 2013–2014: 235,557
- 2014–2015: 251,581 ▲6.8%
- 2015–2016: 284,167 ▲12.95%
- 2016–2017: 307,109 ▲8.07%
- 2017–2018: Not measured
- 2018–2019: 350,700 ▲14.19%
- 2019–2020: 264,050 ▼24.7%
- 2020–2021: 130,400 ▼50.61%

Services
Preceding station	V/Line	Following station
Melton towards Southern Cross	Ballarat line	Ballan towards Wendouree
Melton towards Southern Cross	Melton line	Terminus
Melton towards Southern Cross	Ararat line	Ballan towards Ararat
Melton towards Southern Cross	Maryborough line One daily service	Ballan One-way operation
Location
- Location within Victoria

Bacchus Marsh railway station is a regional railway station operated by V/Line on the Ararat and Ballarat lines, part of the Victoria rail network. It serves the Bacchus Marsh suburb of Maddingley, in Victoria, Australia. Bacchus Marsh is a ground-level premium station, featuring two side platforms. The station opened on 10 February 1887, with the current station provided in 2019.

There used to be a number of sidings opposite the station which were used to stable trains that ran to and from Bacchus Marsh. It also has an operational 70-foot (21 m) turntable, used mainly for turning steam locomotives on special trains.

== History ==
Bacchus Marsh station opened on 10 February 1887 as a temporary terminus of the line from Melbourne. (Bacchus Marsh had been named after an early settler, Captain William Henry Bacchus.) On 4 December 1889, the line further west to Ballan was opened, which completed the direct Melbourne to Ballarat railway.

The contract for the construction of the station building was awarded in 1889, for £1809/8/11. A signal box, with a 45-lever interlocking frame, was brought into use in 1890. By that time, the station had a main platform, with a dock platform at the eastern end, as well as a crossing loop, turntable, and a number of sidings. The station was originally provided with a 53-foot (16 m) turntable. In 1957, it was replaced by the 70-foot (21 m) unit.

In the late 1940s, brown coal, mined at the nearby Maddingley Mine, began to be transported in large quantities by rail, with dedicated trains operating between Bacchus Marsh and the APM Siding in the Melbourne suburb of Fairfield. The coal was used to fire the boilers at the Australian Paper Manufacturers paper mill, with 400 tonnes of coal carried in two trains per day. That traffic continued until the late 1970s, when the boilers at the mill were converted to natural gas firing.

Trains on the single track line were controlled with the Electric Staff system until 1967, when the Automatic and Track Control (ATC) system was provided. At the same time, boom barriers replaced hand-operated gates at the Parwan Road level crossing, located nearby in the down direction, and remote control of the signals at Bank Box crossing loop was provided, with the same being done to the track towards the Parwan Loop in 1987.

During 1987, a number of changes to the station layout occurred, including the removal of a number of points and signals, and the sleeving of a number of levers in the signal box. Around the same time the station building was upgraded. The entry vestibule was enclosed via automatic sliding doors, new toilets and carpets were provided, and a raised platform edge to improve wheelchair access. The station building was painted cream on three sides. In 1990, control of the signals at Rockbank was moved into the signal box. In 1993, the No. 3 road was abolished and, in 1994, No. 3A road was abolished.

In 2005, as part of the Regional Fast Rail project, the control of signals was relocated to Ballarat, and the platform was extended eastwards, in order to increase the speed of trains passing through the curve at the western end of the station. In addition, the curves in the Parwan Creek valley were eased to allow for higher speeds. In 2008, 160 additional car parks were provided at the station.

At the 2016/2017 Victorian State Budget, money was allocated for an additional platform and crossing loop, and the relocation of the stabling facilities to nearby Rowsley. Those works were part of the $518 million Regional Rail Revival project along the Ballarat line, which included the duplication of the line between Deer Park West and Melton, and between Warrenheip and Ballarat East, additional crossing loops at Bungaree, and at Ballan (including an extra platform), and stabling facilities at Maddingley. By February 2021, work along the line was completed and new services were introduced.

A now-demolished Parwan station was located between Bacchus Marsh and Melton, while former stations at Rowsley and Ingliston, located between Bacchus Marsh and Ballan, have also been closed and demolished.

== Platforms and services ==
Bacchus Marsh has two side platforms and is served by V/Line Ballarat and Ararat line trains. During peak periods, a number of services begin and terminate at the station.

Bacchus Marsh platform arrangement
Platform	Line	Destination	Service Type	Source
1	Ballarat line Ararat line Maryborough line	Southern Cross	Maryborough line: One daily V/Line service	
2	Ballarat line Ararat line	Wendouree, Ararat		

== Transport links ==
Bacchus Marsh Coaches operates three routes via Bacchus Marsh station, under contract to Public Transport Victoria:

- 433 : Darley – Maddingley (Maddingley)
- 434 : to Telford Park (Darley)

== Gallery ==
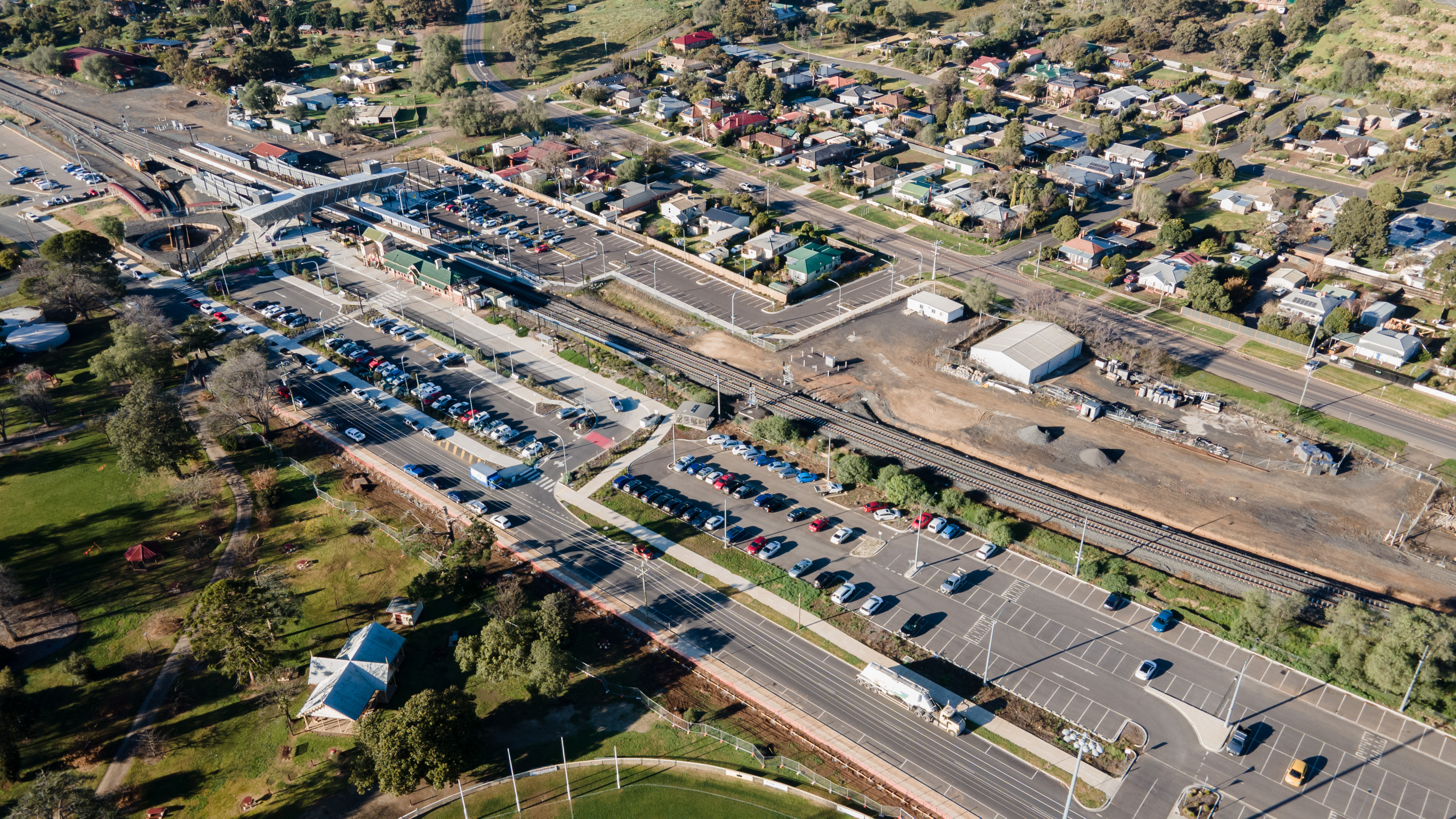
Aerial view of the station, June 2021

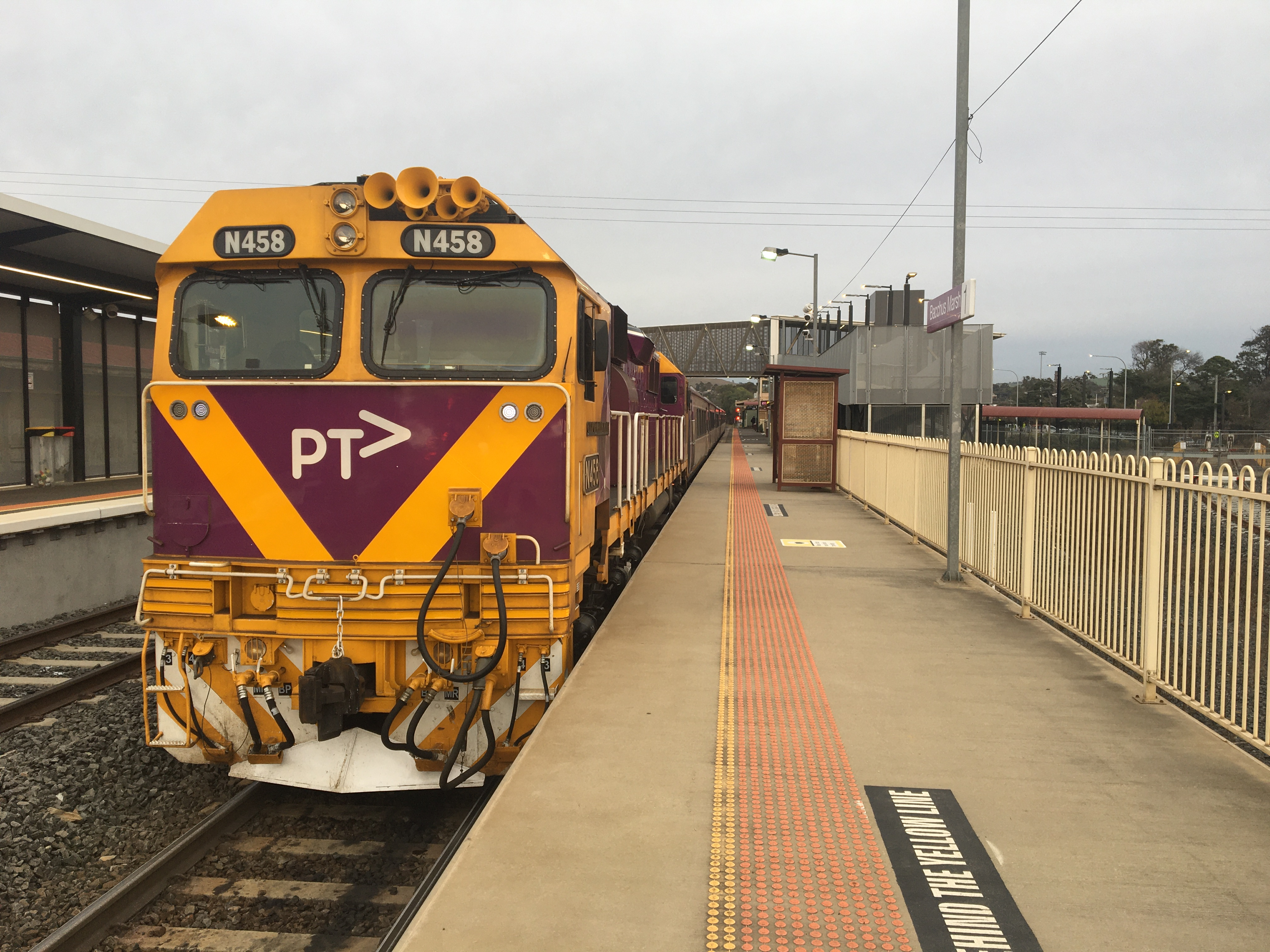
V/Line locomotive N458 sits at Platform 1,
August 2022

== External links & further reading ==
- Newsrail September 1984 pp. 260–263
- Victorian Railway Stations gallery
- Melway map at street-directory.com.au
