= Ballarat railway station =

Railway station in Victoria, Australia

Ballarat
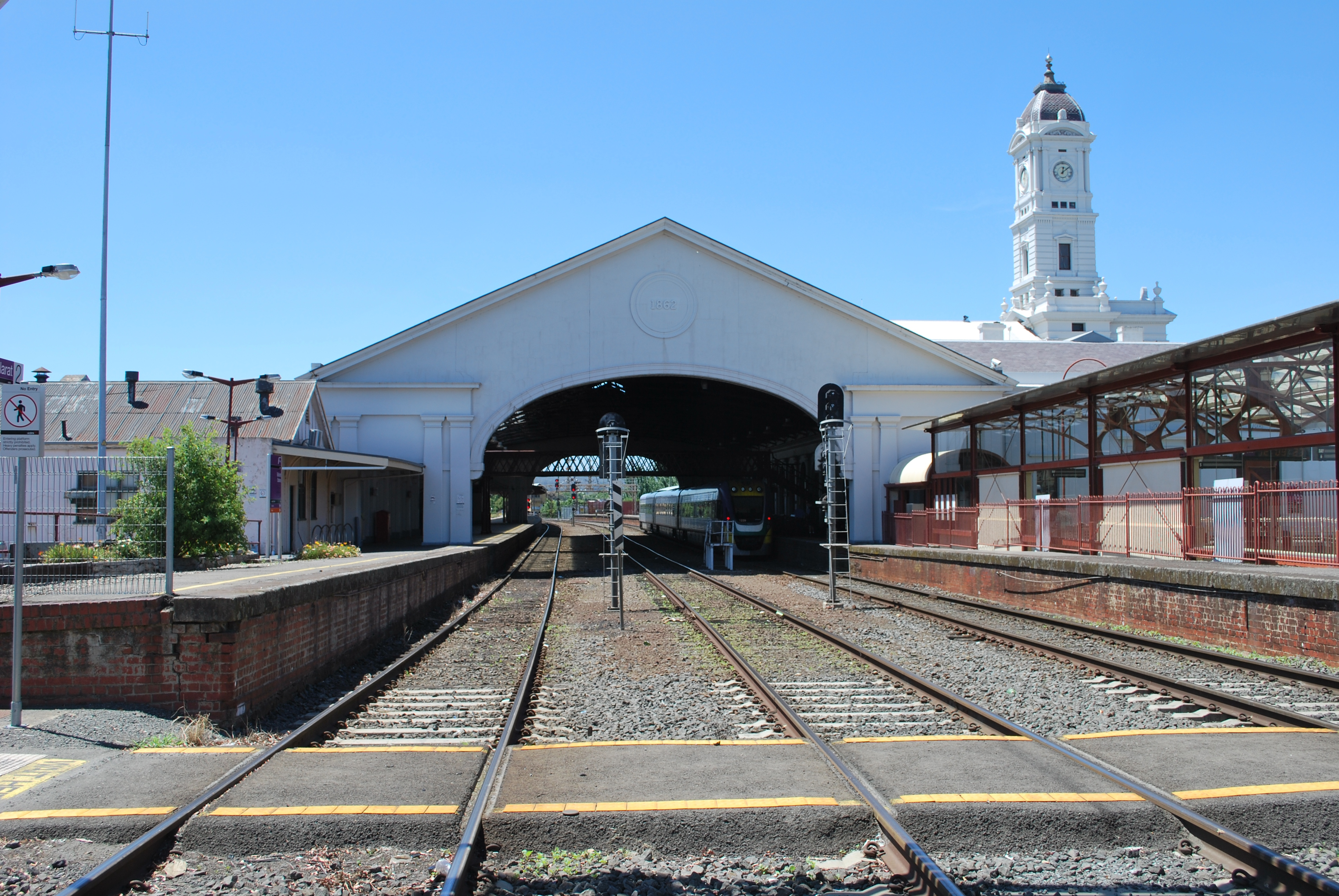
- Eastbound view from the Lydiard Street level crossing, December 2011

General information
- Location: Lydiard Street North, Ballarat Central, Victoria 3350; City of Ballarat; Australia
- Coordinates: 37°33′31″S 143°51′34″E
- System: PTV regional rail station
- Owner: VicTrack
- Operator: V/Line
- Lines: Ballarat Ararat (Ararat); Maryborough (Mildura)
- Distance: 118.80 kilometres from Southern Cross
- Platforms: 2 side
- Tracks: 3
- Connections: Bus; Coach

Construction
- Structure type: At-grade
- Parking: Yes
- Cycle facilities: Yes
- Accessible: Yes

Other information
- Status: Operational, staffed
- Station code: BAL
- Fare zone: Myki zone 8
- Website: Public Transport Victoria

History
- Opened: 11 April 1862; 164 years ago
- Rebuilt: 31 March 2026 (upgrades)
- Former names: Ballarat West (1862-1865)

Passengers
- 2013–2014: 528,334
- 2014–2015: 558,837 ▲5.77%
- 2015–2016: 586,859 ▲5.01%
- 2016–2017: 604,115 ▲2.94%
- 2017–2018: Not measured
- 2018–2019: 624,050 ▲3.29%
- 2019–2020: 459,700 ▼26.33%
- 2020–2021: 179,500 ▼60.95%

Services
Preceding station	V/Line	Following station
Ballan towards Southern Cross	Ballarat line	Wendouree Terminus
Ballan towards Southern Cross	Ararat line	Wendouree towards Ararat
Terminus	Maryborough line	Creswick towards Maryborough
Ballan towards Southern Cross	Maryborough line One daily service	Creswick One-way operation
Former service
Preceding station	Disused railways	Following station
Terminus	Geelong–Ballarat line	Warrenheip
Terminus	Buninyong line	Eureka
Terminus	Skipton line	Kopke
Terminus	Colac–Ballarat line	Cardigan
Location
- Location within Victoria

Ballarat railway station is a regional railway station operated by V/Line on the Ararat and Mildura railway lines, part of the Victoria rail network. It serves the city of Ballarat, in Victoria, Australia. Ballarat is a ground level staffed station, featuring two side platforms. It opened on 11 April 1862, with the current station upgrades provided in March 2026.

The station initially opened as Ballarat West and gained its current name of Ballarat in 1865.

The extensive building complex is listed on the Victorian Heritage Register as being of "historical, architectural, social and technological significance" to the State of Victoria. Significant 19th-century heritage features listed on the Register include the station's signal boxes; the goods shed, being the only one in Victoria built of bluestone; the clock tower, with Ballarat being one of only four 19th-century railway station in Australia to prominently feature one, although the clock itself was not installed until almost a century later in 1984; and the train shed, with Ballarat being one of only three 19th-century railway stations in Australia retaining their original train shed. The replica interlocked mechanical gates were damaged in a 2020 train collision.

Disused stations Ballarat East, Warrenheip, Bungaree and Gordon are located between Ballarat and Ballan.

== History ==
=== 19th century ===
Ballarat West railway station, as it was then known, was constructed at a cost of almost £22,000, as part of the original railway line to Melbourne via Geelong, built to serve the booming Ballarat goldfields. A bluestone engine shed was built to the south, and a goods shed to the north was added in 1863. In 1877, the footbridge and waiting rooms on the south side were added. In 1885, hand-operated railway gates were provided at the level crossing at Lydiard Street, together with the "B" signal box to operate it on the western side.

Following the opening of the direct line from Ballarat to Melbourne in December 1889, the increase in patronage led to an upgrade of the station. A grand portico, stationmaster's office and clock tower were designed in 1888 and added in 1891, although no clock was installed in the tower.

=== 20th century ===
With the amalgamation of the Ballarat East and West Town Councils in 1921 to form the City of Ballaarat, and the closure of Ballarat East station, the station gradually dropped the name Ballarat West.

On 13 December 1981, fire badly damaged the interior of the 1888 section of the station building, including the station-master's office, waiting room, booking office, dining room and clock tower. All of these areas were later repaired and retained. Many of the original features were restored, but some interiors, including the booking office, were subsequently modernised. A clock was added to the tower in 1984.

In 1983, the State Transport Authority proposed to demolish the interlocking gates at Lydiard Street. The City of Ballaarat, the National Trust and the Historic Buildings Council responded with a successful campaign to save the gates.

In 1990, conservationists succeeded in their lobbying to preserve the historic railway gates. An automated mechanical system was built to enable their continued use. Additional restoration was carried out in 2005, and the station roof was renovated with Welsh slate to match the original southern roof.

In 1994, the bus interchange near the station entrance was upgraded.

=== 21st century ===
Following the 2006 Regional Fast Rail project, and the introduction of V/Line's VLocity trains, as well as the reintroduction of services to Ararat in 2004, passenger numbers at Ballarat increased by as much as 40% a year. A call for a second station ensued, which resulted in Wendouree being opened in June 2009 to alleviate congestion at Ballarat, mainly caused by park and ride passengers from Ballarat's outer western suburbs. A further increase in trains followed the resumption of passenger services to Maryborough in 2010.

On 30 May 2020, a VLocity passenger train, operated by V/Line, failed to stop at Ballarat, and crashed into the interlocked gates protecting the Lydiard Street North level crossing. Four men were on board the Ballarat-bound service and were injured in the collision, including the driver and conductor. The Australian Transport Safety Bureau investigated the incident, and issued a preliminary report (Note: ATSB preliminary reports contain factual information established in the investigation's early evidence collection phase but no analysis or findings, which are detailed in the final report.) in September 2020. It established that the train had travelled through the station at 23:35 at about 100 kilometres per hour (62 miles per hour), passed a departure signal at stop, and struck the gates at the level crossing, before coming to rest 600 metres (660 yards) west of the station.

On 16 November 2021, the level crossing reopened with temporary boom barriers installed, with the remains of the interlocked gates placed in storage in nearby Wendouree. The reopening was part of a $10.5 million program to replace the signalling system around the station.

On 19 December 2021, a new bus interchange opened at the north side of the station, at the former location of the sidings to the historic Goods Shed.

In 2024, it was announced that Ballarat station would be getting an upgrade. The upgrades included a new pedestrian overpass linking both platforms, new lifts and stairs on each platform, improved automatic sliding doors, lighting and tactile boarding indicators and the northern entrance receiving new ramps and stairs. In 2025, construction works have started on the Ballarat station upgrade for preparation of the pedestrian overpass and other upgrades. In February 2026, the station's bus interchange reopened, whilst the pedestrian overpass later opened to the public on 31 March 2026.

== Platforms and services ==
Ballarat has two side platforms. It is served by V/Line Ballarat, Ararat and Maryborough line trains.

Ballarat platform arrangement
Platform	Line	Destination	Via	Service Type	Notes	Source
1	Ballarat line Ararat line	Southern Cross	Bacchus Marsh	All stations and limited express services		
1	Maryborough line	Maryborough		All stations	Shuttle services.	
2	Ballarat line Ararat line	Wendouree, Ararat		All stations		

== Transport links ==
=== Bus services ===
CDC Ballarat operates fourteen bus routes to and from Ballarat station, under contract to Public Transport Victoria:

- 10 : to Alfredton
- 11 : to Wendouree station
- 12 : to Wendouree station
- 13 : to Invermay Park
- 14 : to Black Hill
- 15 : to Brown Hill
- 20 : to Canadian
- 21 : to Buninyong
- 22 : to Federation University Ballarat Campus
- 23 : to Mount Pleasant
- 24 : to Sebastopol
- 25 : to Delacombe
- 26 : to Alfredton
- 30 : to Creswick

=== Road coaches ===
V/Line operates road coach services from Ballarat station to:

- Bendigo via Maryborough and Castlemaine
- Halls Gap and the Grampians National Park via Ararat and Stawell
- Horsham, Dimboola, Nhill and Adelaide
- Geelong
- Hamilton and Mount Gambier
- Ouyen, Donald and Mildura
- Warrnambool

=== Trails ===
The station is the official starting point of two multi-use trails:

- The Wallaby Track, part of the Great Dividing Trail, which goes to Daylesford and Buninyong
- The Ballarat-Skipton Rail Trail, which uses the route of the former branch line to Skipton

== Gallery ==
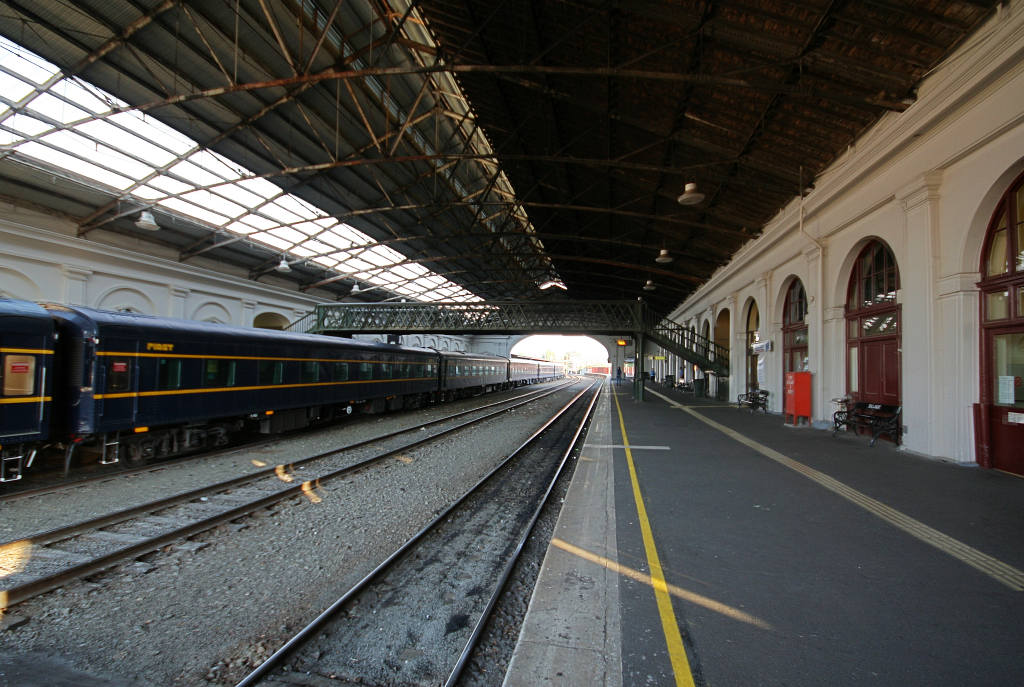
Eastbound view from Platform 1, December 2007

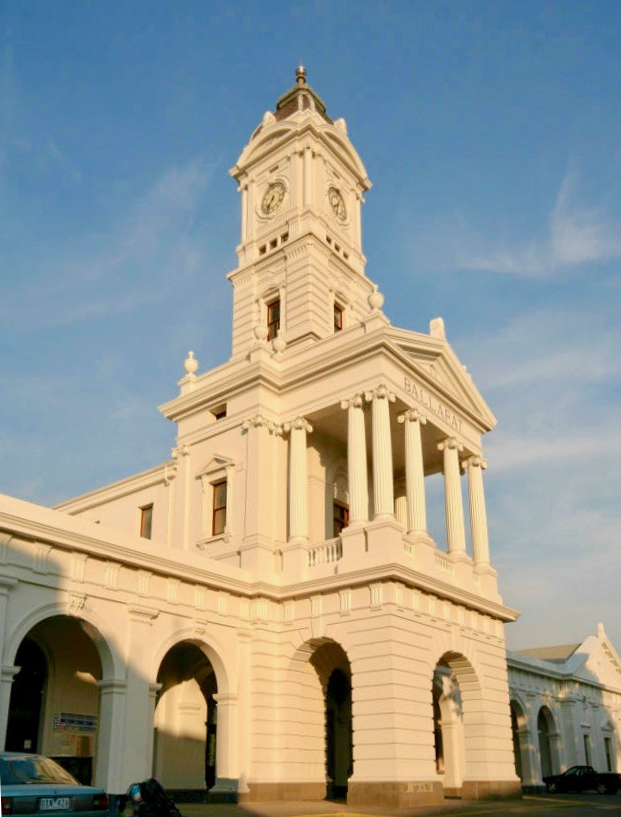
View of the station clock tower, December 2007

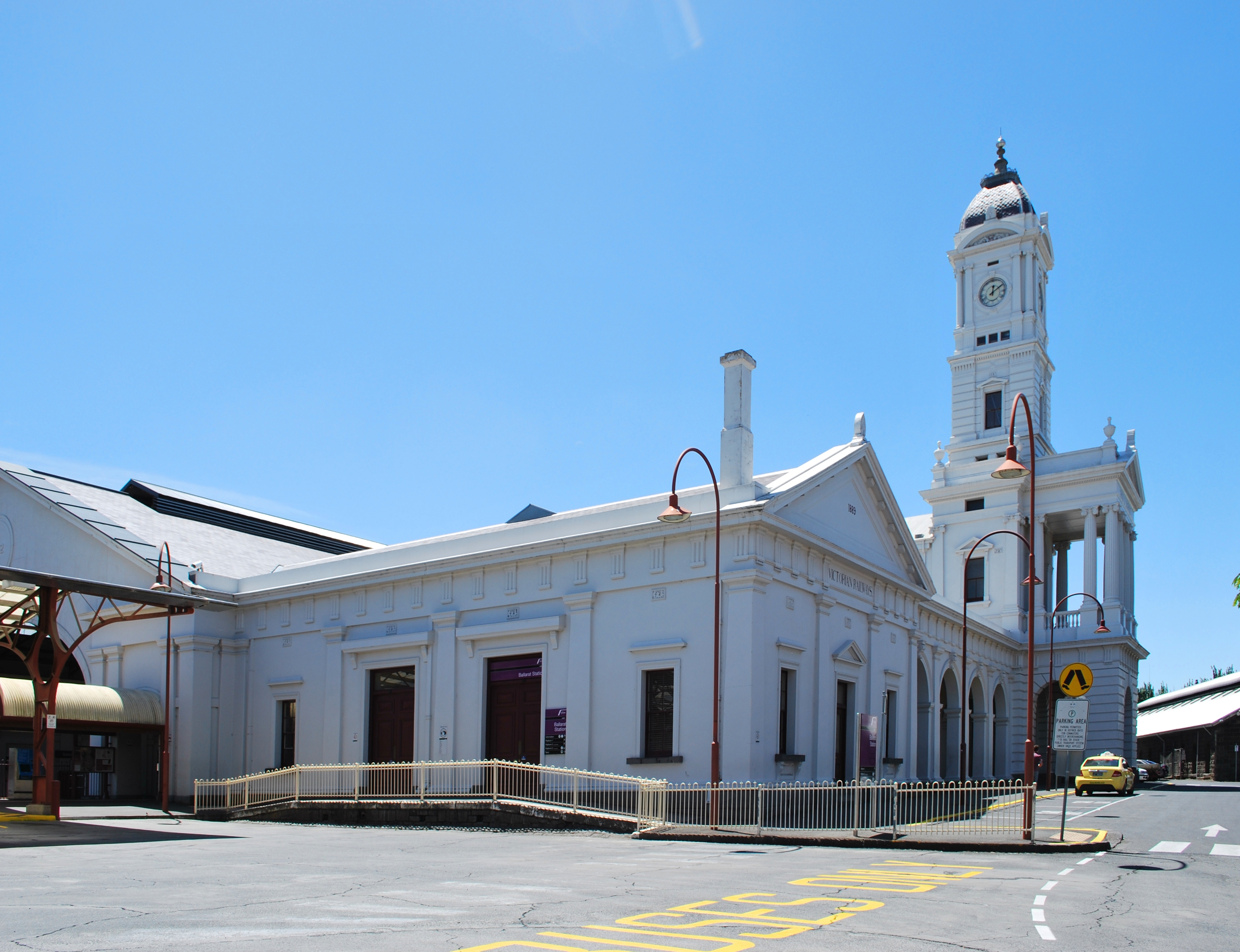
Station front and entrance to Platform 1,
December 2011

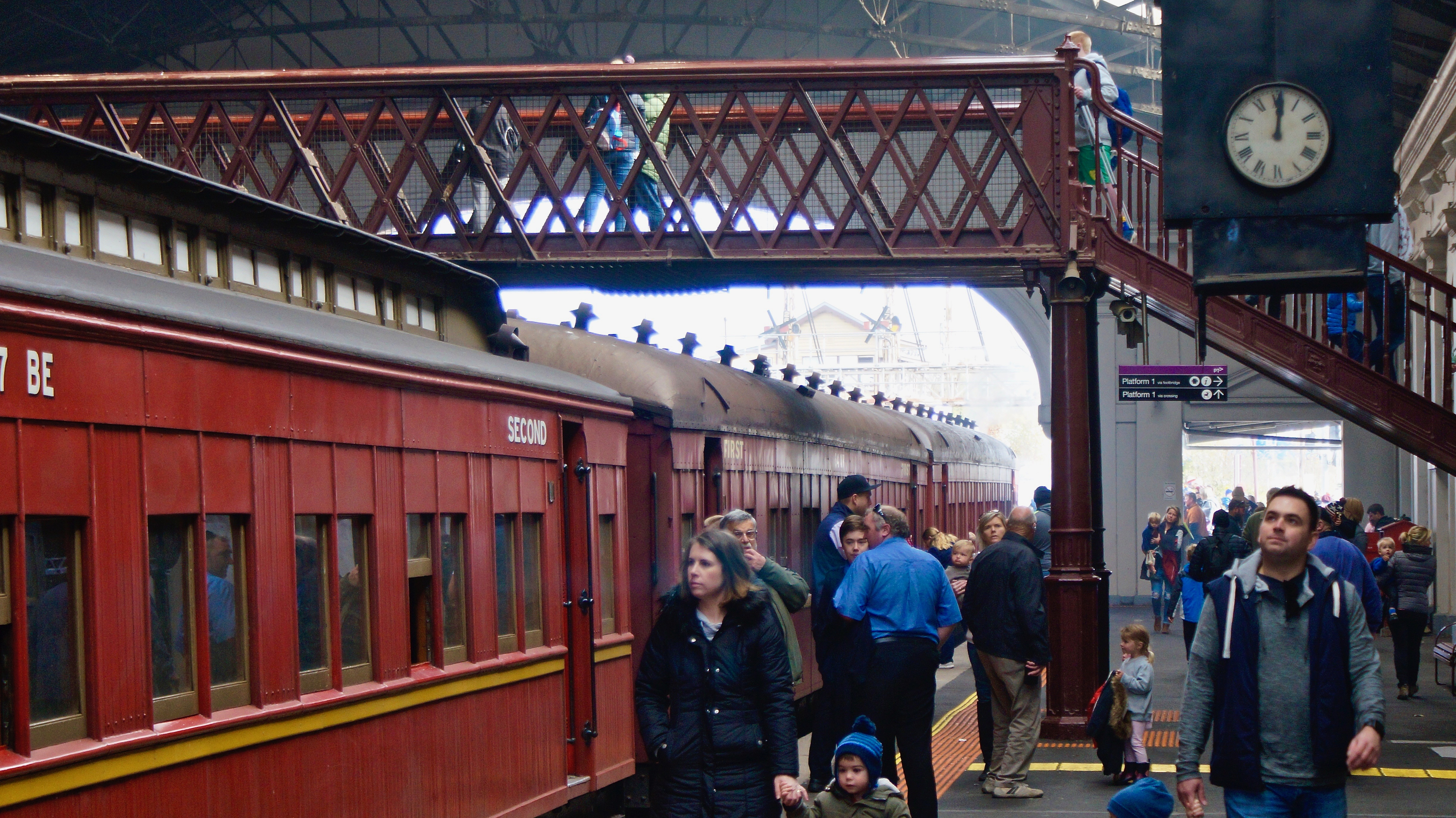
Westbound view of Platform 2, May 2017

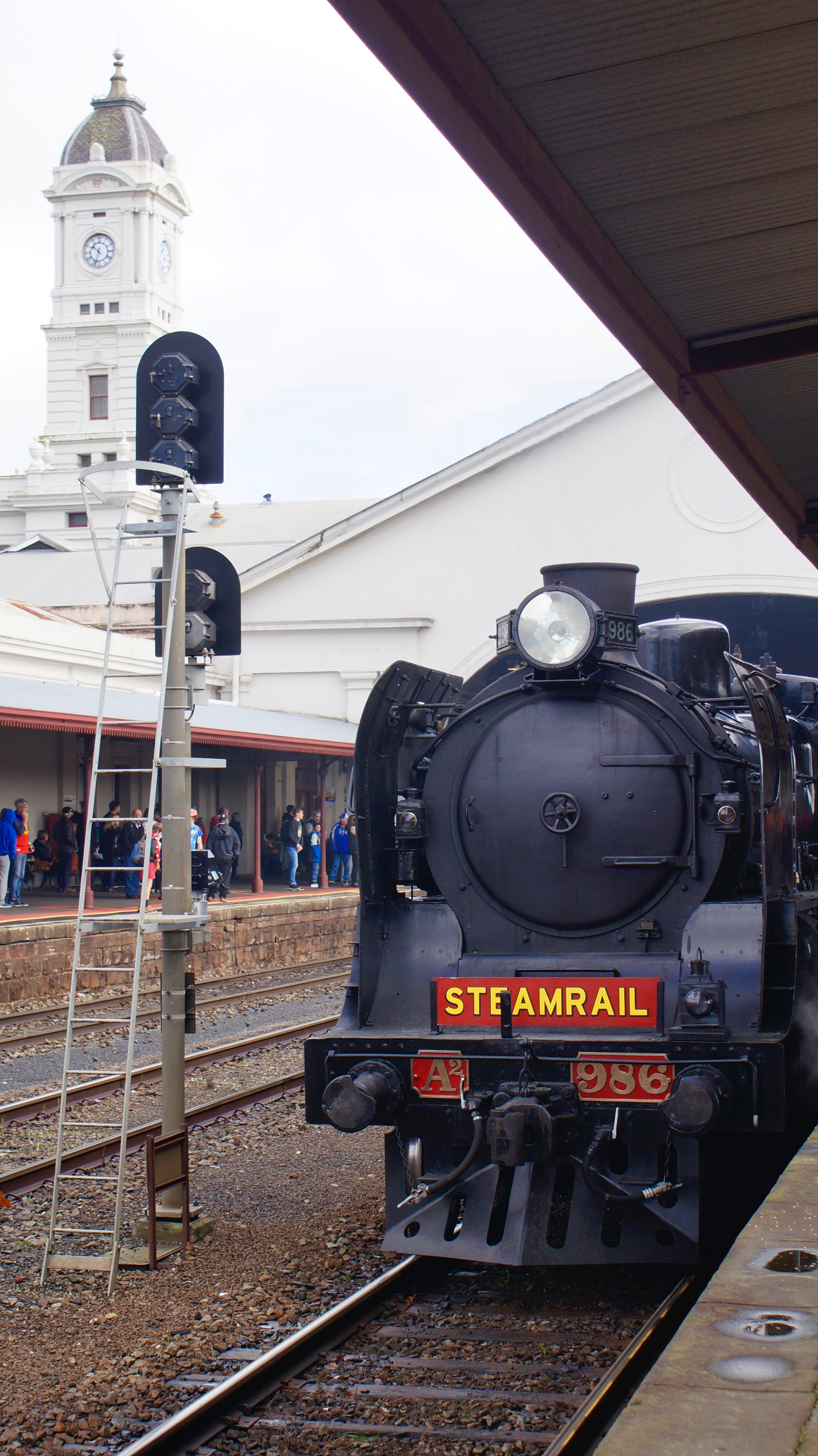
Preserved A2 class locomotive 986 sits at Platform 2 during the Ballarat Heritage Weekend, May 2017

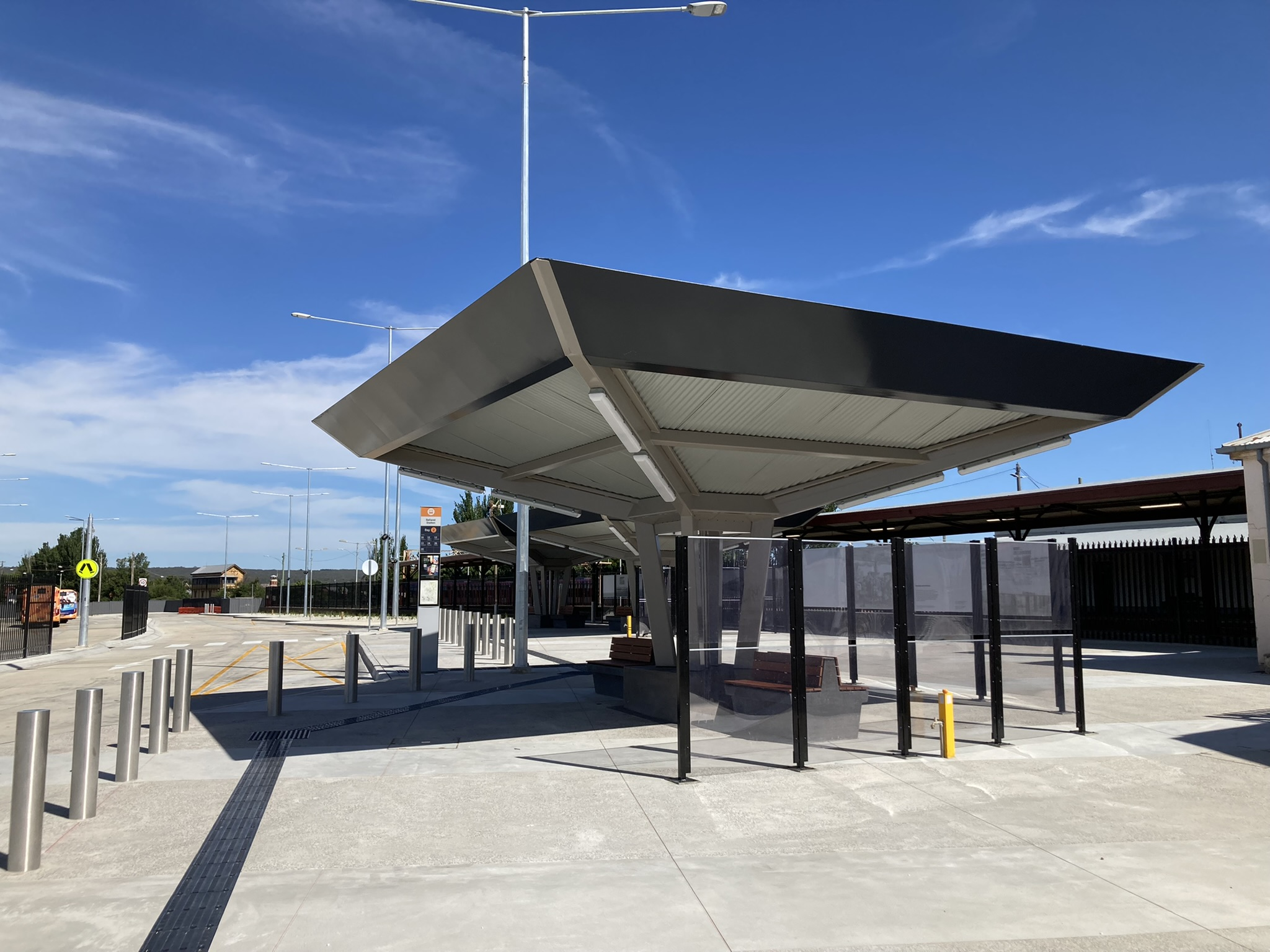
Newly opened bus interchange, December 2021
