= Ingliston railway station =

Former railway station in Australia

Ingliston

General information
- Location: Australia
- Owner: VicTrack
- Line: Serviceton
- Platforms: 0, formerly 1

Other information
- Status: Demolished

History
- Opened: 4 December 1889
- Closed: 7 April 1963

Services
Preceding station	Disused railways	Following station
Bank Box	Serviceton line	Ballan
	List of closed railway stations in Victoria	

Ingliston railway station was a railway station on the Serviceton railway line located in the town of Ingliston. It was opened on 4 December 1889, and closed on 7 April 1963. Today, there are no remains of the former station.

== History ==
On 20 September 1889, a contract was approved by the Victorian Railways to construct the goods shed and platforms. The station was opened with the extension of the Serviceton railway line from Bacchus Marsh to Ballan and was provided with 1 platform, 3 tracks, a goods shed and a Siding. On 3 October 1922, the Station master was withdrawn. The station was closed on 7 April 1963, and was demolished some time after.
