= Parwan railway station =

Former railway station in Victoria, Australia

Coordinates: 37°42′21″S 144°28′14″E

Parwan
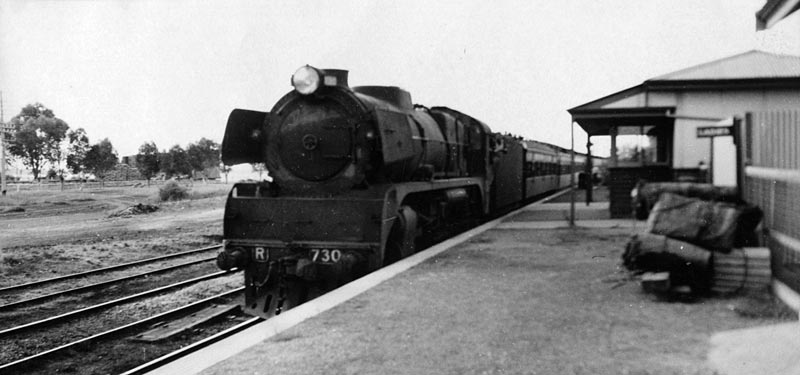
- Victorian Railways R class locomotive R 730, hauling a Melbourne-Dimboola passenger service, at Parwan, 1953

General information
- Line: Ararat
- Platforms: 1
- Tracks: 2

Other information
- Status: Closed

History
- Opened: 18 March 1886
- Closed: 1987

Services
| Preceding station | V/Line | Following station |
|---|---|---|
| Melton towards Southern Cross | Ararat line | Bacchus Marsh towards Ararat |
List of closed railway stations in Victoria
Location

Parwan is a closed station located in the town of Parwan, near Bacchus Marsh, on the Ararat railway line in Victoria, Australia. The station platform was on the southern side of the line. Today, Parwan is a crossing loop, permitting trains up to 969 metres long to cross.

The station opened to unofficial traffic on 18 March 1886, with the line extended to Bacchus Marsh on 16 February 1887. By 1890, Parwan had a platform, goods shed, a 20-lever interlocked signal box and a three road yard.

In 1920, the crossing loop at the up end of the station was extended, and became known as Works Siding. The Ballast Siding became the new main running line in September 1922, and the old main line became a siding, which closed in early 1923. Automatic staff exchangers were provided around May 1927. A new station building was erected on in 1948, along with a new signal frame.

During 1983, the dead-end siding at the up end of No.2 track was shortened to 110m, and work commenced on extending the loop, as part of the CTC signalling system, which was being introduced on the Serviceton line. The former Works Siding was also discontinued in the same year, after a derailment involving passenger train The Overland. In 1984, the station was closed as a crossing point, with all points and signals removed, and the signal box abolished. It was replaced by the extended Parwan Loop, but was not closed for passengers until some time later. In 1987, the crossing loop was altered to be remotely controlled from Bacchus Marsh. By March of the same year, all facilities, including the platform, had been removed.

As part of re-signalling with the Regional Fast Rail project, control was relocated to the Ballarat signal panel in 2005.
