= Gordon railway station, Victoria =

Former railway station in Victoria, Australia

Coordinates: 37.5943°S 144.0994°E

Gordon

General information
- Platforms: 1
- Tracks: 1

Other information
- Status: Closed

History
- Opened: 7 May 1879
- Closed: 4 October 1981
- Former names: Gordons

Services
Preceding station	Disused railways	Following station
Ballan	Melbourne - Ballarat line	Bungaree
	List of closed railway stations in Victoria	
Location

Gordon is a closed railway station, located in the town of Gordon, on the Melbourne - Ballarat railway line in Victoria, Australia. In the 2010s, the station building was renovated by a group associated with the former Victorian division of the Australian Railway Historical Society.

The station opened on 7 May 1879 as Gordons. It opened at the same time as the railway line through it, with the present building dating from this time. On 21 November 1904, the station was renamed Gordon.

By September 1975, the platform had been reduced in length, from 122 metres to 61 metres. It was one of 35 stations closed to passenger traffic on 4 October 1981, as part of the New Deal timetable for country passengers.

The building is of timber construction, with posted verandahs along the platform and roadside elevations, as well as a distinctive curved roof. The building once included a residence, but was later altered to incorporate a central booking lobby and an enlarged stationmaster's office. The design was an experimental prototype for low cost station buildings for less important lines, and is the only example of its type.

The site is listed on the Victorian Heritage Register.
