= Warrenheip railway station =

Former railway station in Victoria, Australia

Coordinates: 37°34′41″S 143°55′23″E

Warrenheip
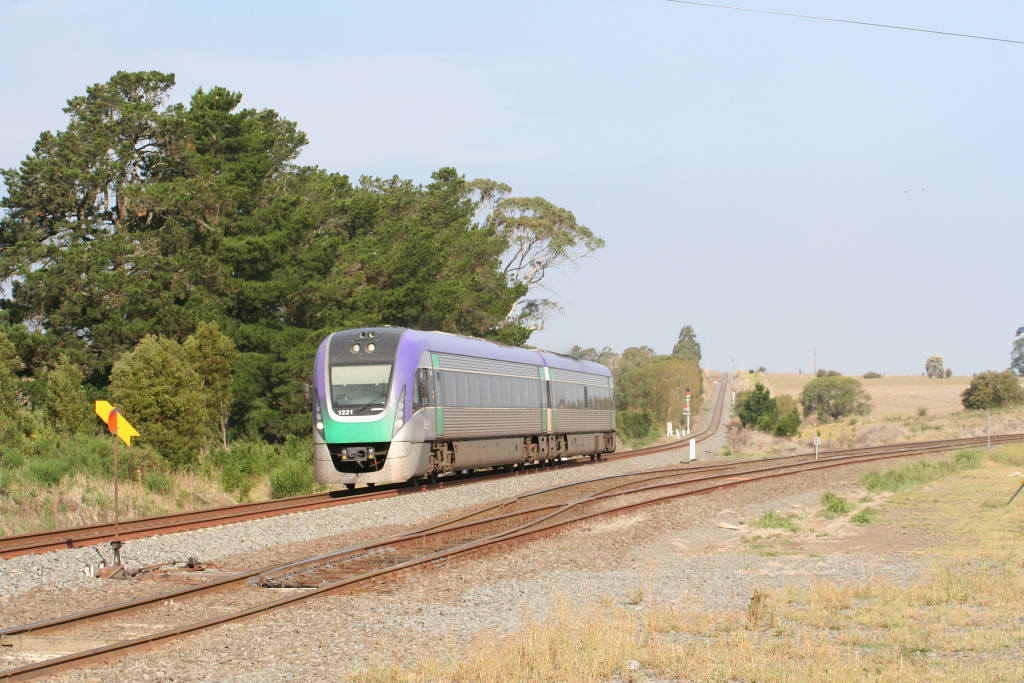
- V/Line VLocity train on the Ballarat-Melbourne line, passing the junction at Warrenheip, February 2007

General information
- Line: Serviceton
- Platforms: 1
- Tracks: 2

Other information
- Status: Closed

History
- Opened: 1 February 1873
- Closed: 4 October 1981

Services
Preceding station	Disused railways	Following station
Bungaree	Serviceton line	Ballarat East
Navigator	Geelong-Ballarat line	Ballarat East
	List of closed railway stations in Victoria	
Location

Warrenheip is a closed station located in the town of Warrenheip, on the Serviceton line in Victoria, Australia. The junction of the Geelong-Ballarat line is at the up end of the former station site.

The double track Geelong to Ballarat line, which ran through the area, opened in 1862. The station opened in 1873, and became a junction in 1879, when a branch line was built towards Gordon station. That branch line eventually became the direct line to Melbourne, which was completed in 1889.

The station was one of 35 closed to passenger traffic on 4 October 1981, as part of the New Deal timetable for country passengers.

On 23 February 1994, a number of alterations took place at Warrenheip, including the removal of sidings A, B and C, the crossover from the Geelong-Ballarat line to track A (the down line towards Ballarat station) was abolished and the removed of a number of points and signal posts. In 1995, the double line from Ballarat station to Warrenheip was converted to two parallel and independent lines, and the junction abolished. An unattended crossing loop remains on the line to Geelong.

== New Warrenheip station proposal ==
In 2016, local and state governments proposed to build a new park-and-ride station at Warrenheip. The proposal would see up to eight hectares of land turned into permanent 1000 commuter car parks and a bus interchange. The aim is to complete the proposal by 2026. The opposition Liberal Coalition party announced plans to complete the station rebuild for the 2018 state election.

The Ballarat line is the second busiest V/Line service in the state.
