= Bungaree railway station =

Former railway station in Victoria, Australia

Coordinates: 37°33′33″S 144°00′16″E

Bungaree

General information
- Line: Ararat
- Platforms: 1
- Tracks: 2

Other information
- Status: Closed

History
- Closed: 4 October 1981

Services
Preceding station	V/Line	Following station
Gordon towards Southern Cross	Ararat line	Warrenheip towards Ararat
List of closed railway stations in Victoria
Location

Bungaree is a closed station located in the town of Bungaree, on the Ararat railway line in Victoria, Australia. The station was one of 35 closed to passenger traffic on 4 October 1981 as part of the New Deal timetable for country passengers.

A high-speed deviation was built south of Bungaree as part of the Regional Fast Rail project. The original line stayed open as an extended crossing loop, but was closed in early 2021, following the duplication of part of the deviation.
