= Ararat railway line =

Railway line in Victoria, Australia

Ararat
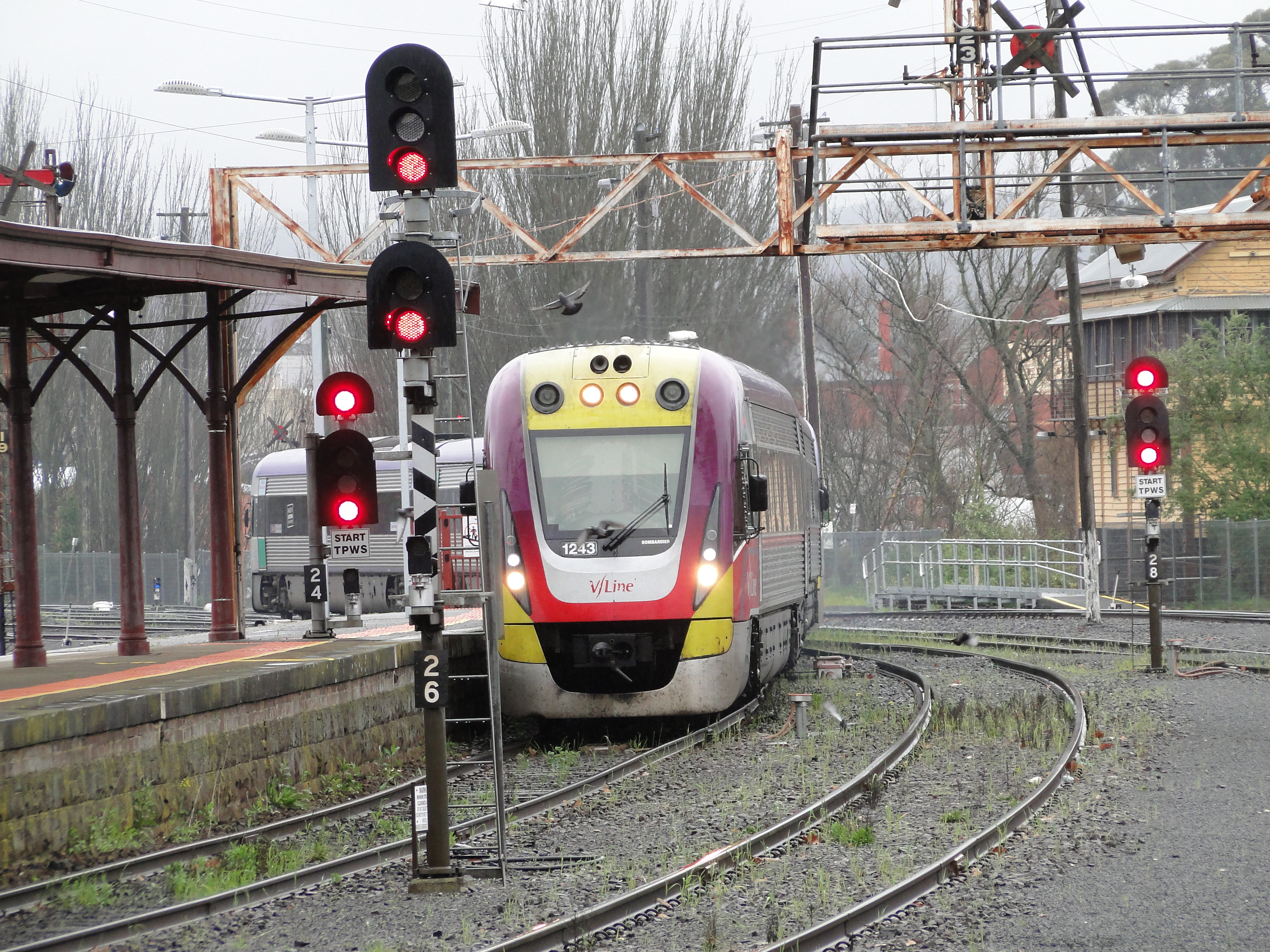
- A V/Line VLocity entering Ballarat, 2016

Overview
- Connecting lines: Geelong-Ballarat and Mildura (at Ballarat); Geelong via the Regional Rail Link (at Deer Park), Bendigo and Sunbury (at Sunshine)
- Former connections: See Former branch lines section
- Stations: 14 in service

Service
- Type: V/Line passenger service
- System: V/Line Ballarat line
- Rolling stock: V/Line VLocity

History
- Opened: 1887 (to Serviceton); 1889 (direct route via Melton); 2004 (Ballarat–Ararat services resumed)
- Completed: 1887 (Melbourne–Serviceton via Geelong and Ballarat); 1889 (Melbourne–Ballarat via Melton)
- Closed: 1994 (Ararat–Serviceton converted to Western standard gauge line, services Ballarat–Ararat withdrawn)

Technical
- Number of tracks: Double (Melbourne–Melton); Single with passing loops (Melton–Ararat)
- Track gauge: 1,600 mm (5 ft 3 in) Victorian broad gauge
- Signalling: Staff & Ticket from Wendouree to Ararat

The Ararat railway line (formerly known as the Serviceton and Western lines) is a railway line in Victoria, Australia. It links the state capital of Melbourne to the cities of Ballarat and Ararat via the Regional Rail Link.

The line began construction in 1874, when the original line to Ballarat was extended westwards to Beaufort, eventually reaching Serviceton at the disputed South Australian border in 1887 to form the Victorian part of the Melbourne–Adelaide railway. In 1889, the line became the direct Melbourne−Ballarat railway when it was extended eastwards from Ballarat to Bacchus Marsh, meeting with another line constructed from Sunshine.

In 1995, the line beyond Ararat, along with several old branch lines, was converted to standard gauge and reopened to form part of the 1435 mm (4 ft 8 1/2 in) Western standard gauge railway line. Services past Ballarat were withdrawn until 2004 when services to Ararat were reinstated.

The line has seen numerous packages of upgrades. As part of the Regional Fast Rail project, several parts of the track were realigned to reduce curves and grades, enabling trains to run up to 160 km/h. The Regional Rail Link project saw the construction of a new alignment between Sunshine and Southern Cross dedicated to regional trains, separating the line from the Sunbury line. As part of the Regional Rail Revival project, the line was duplicated up to Melton. The Level Crossing Removal Project has grade-separated three level crossings and rebuilt Deer Park station, making the line level-crossing free between Deer Park and Southern Cross. In 2026, another four level crossings are planned to be removed, with Melton station to be rebuilt. There are plans for future quadruplication and electrification of the line up to Melton.

== Services ==
V/Line currently operates services on the line towards Ballarat, Ararat and Maryborough (on the Mildura line, which junctions at Ballarat) via the Regional Rail Link. In the future, the line is planned to be electrified as far as Melton.

Several services on the line originate and terminate at Melton, with some additional services originating and terminating at Bacchus Marsh. Four weekday services and three weekend services are operated to Ararat, while only one service is operated each day to Maryborough. Myki is available between Southern Cross and Wendouree.

Freight services sometimes also use the line between Ballarat and Melbourne, coming off the Mildura line.

== History ==
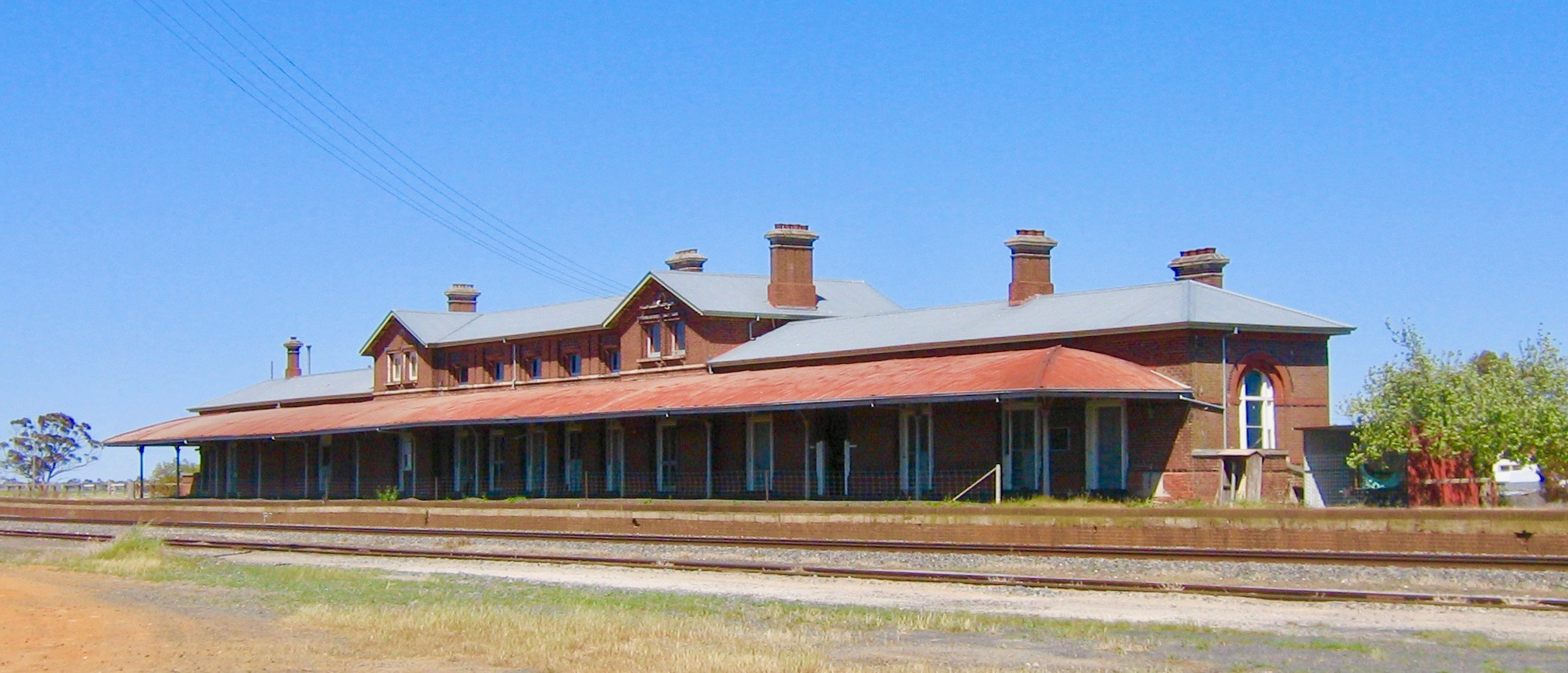
Serviceton railway station lies 2.08 kilometres (1.3 mi) east of the Victoria−South Australia border, the location of which was disputed for 40 years.

Before the direct line from Melbourne to Ballarat commenced operations in 1889, trains from Melbourne to Ballarat went via Geelong on the Geelong–Ballarat railway line.

=== 19th century ===
From Ballarat, the Ararat line was extended further west to Beaufort in 1874, to Ararat in 1875, Stawell in 1876, Murtoa in 1878, Horsham in 1882, Dimboola in 1882, and lastly Nhill and Serviceton in 1887, where it met with the South Australian Railways line from Adelaide.

The direct route from Melbourne to Ballarat opened in 1889, when a branch line from Ballarat to Warrenheip was progressively extended eastwards to Bacchus Marsh and connected with a branch line off the Bendigo line at Braybrook Junction to Melton. The line to Melton opened in 1874 and later extended to Bacchus Marsh in 1887.

=== 20th century ===
In 1994, V/Line passenger rail services beyond Ballarat were withdrawn to allow for the conversion of the line beyond Ararat to standard gauge. The Serviceton−Ararat section, now standard gauge, was connected to a section of the Portland line, which in turn connected to the Maroona−Gheringhap line, both also converted to standard gauge as part of the project. In 1995 the completed line opened as the Western standard gauge railway line.

=== 21st century ===
==== Restoration of Ararat services ====
In 2004, passenger services to Ararat were restored.

==== Regional Fast Rail ====
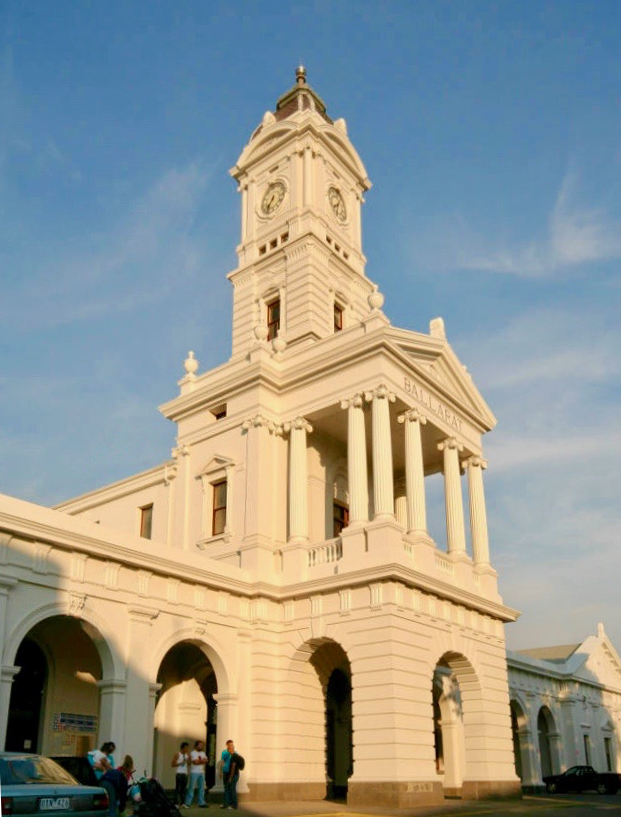
Clocktower at Ballarat station

Major upgrades to the line occurred as part of Regional Fast Rail, a project announced in 2000 by then-Premier Steve Bracks with the aim of shortening travel times between the major Victorian regional centres and Melbourne by upgrading the tracks and introducing V/Line VLocity diesel multiple-unit trains. Heavier tracks and concrete sleepers were laid, ballast was renewed and a new signalling system was installed. Curves and grades on the line were eased by constructing new deviations from the main line and seven new bridges, including the Lal Lal Creek and Moorabool River bridges, which at the time were among the longest in Australia. Most of the original alignment remained, serving as crossing loops.

The first VLocity train ran on the line to Ballarat on 22 December 2005.

==== Regional Rail Revival ====
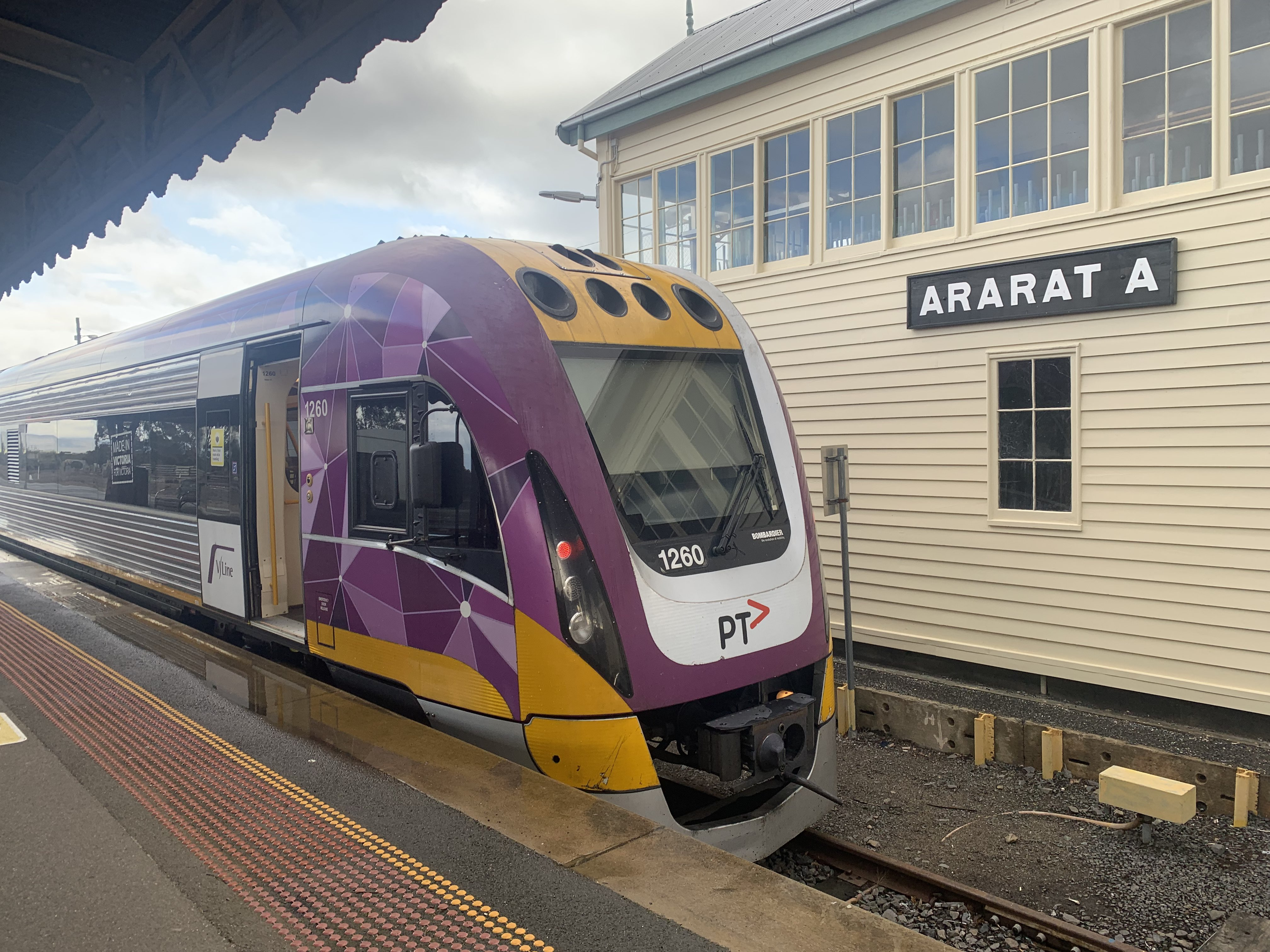
VLocity train at Ararat, 2022

Another significant round of upgrades occurred to the line as part of the Regional Rail Revival project, beginning in early 2018 with major construction completed in 2021. The project, with a budget of $518 million, saw the duplication of 17 kilometres of track between Deer Park and Melton, addition of a second platform and track at Rockbank, Bacchus Marsh and Ballan, the construction of Cobblebank Station, and new a passing loop at Millbrook. The upgrades enable future electrification of the line to Melton. The new passing loop at Millbrook also allowed the original line via Bungaree to be decommissioned, with level crossings and railway infrastructure at these crossings removed.

==== Level Crossing Removal Project ====
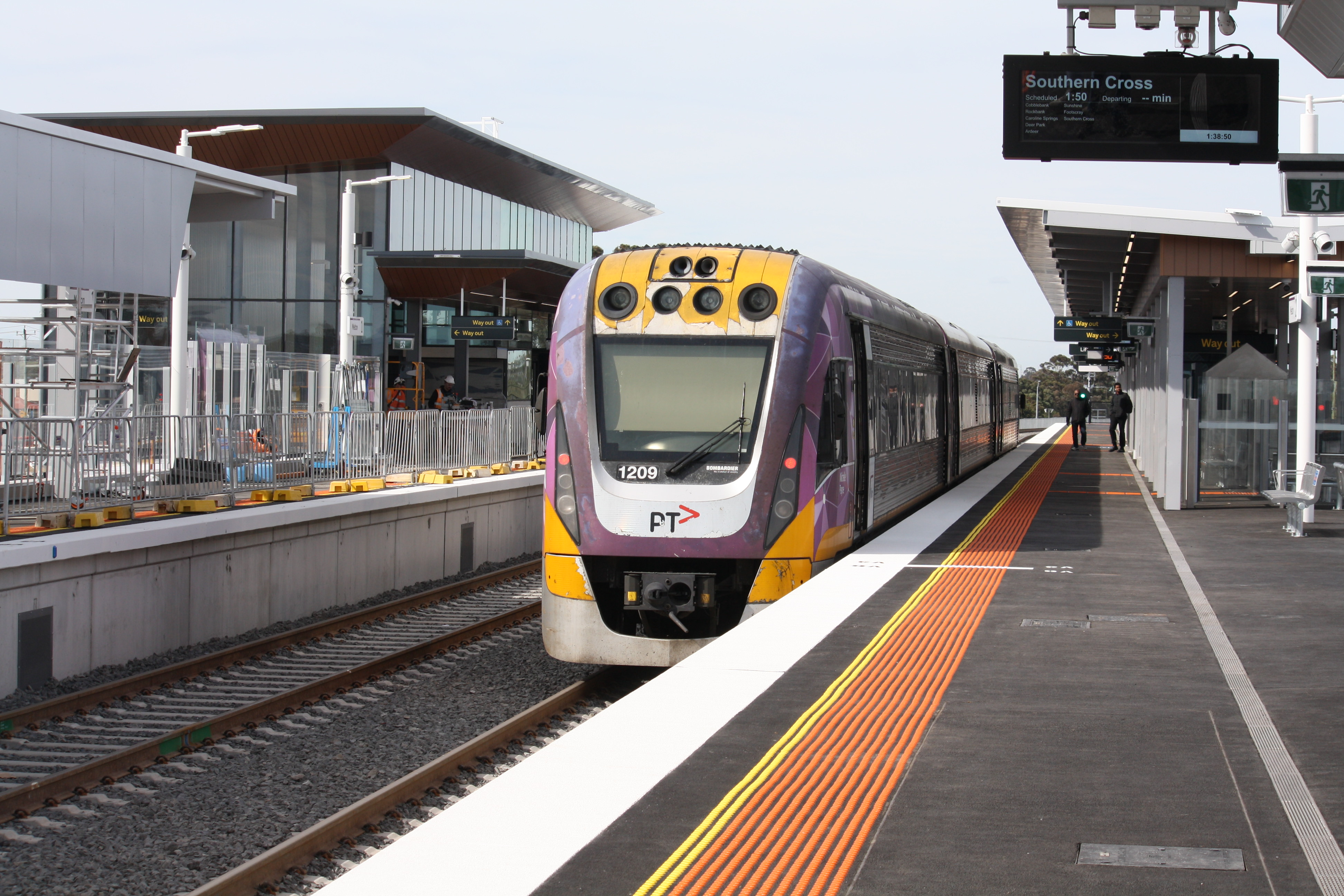
A first generation V/Line VLocity train, set 1209 at the rebuilt Melton station on its opening day, September 2026

The Level Crossing Removal Project has removed several level crossings along the line between 2022 and 2026. In 2022, the first crossings was removed: Fitzgerald Road in Ardeer, by building a road bridge over the rail line. The crossing at Robinsons Road in Deer Park was removed by elevating the rail line over the road. In 2023, the Mt Derrimut Road level crossing in Deer Park was removed by elevating the rail line; Deer Park Station was rebuilt as part of this removal. The line is level-crossing free between Deer Park and Southern Cross. In 2026, a further four level crossings were removed in Melton and Truganina. These include: Coburns Road, Exford Road and Ferris Road in Melton, and Hopkins Road in Truganina. This project also included with Melton station being rebuilt with four platforms.

A package of accessibility upgrades at Ballarat Station began in 2025, delivered by the Level Crossing Removal Project. The northern (platform 2) entrance of the station has been modified to fit a wheelchair-accessible ramp. A new pedestrian overpass, accessible with a lift or stairs, was completed in March 2026. Previously, the only way to cross the platforms at Ballarat without using stairs is by using the pedestrian level crossing over the tracks.

== Future ==
=== Quadruplication and Melton electrification ===
Electrification to Rockbank was suggested as early as the 1969 Melbourne Transport Plan. In 2013, Public Transport Victoria released the Network Development Plan – Metropolitan Rail, stage 3 of which includes quadruplication and electrification up to Melton. The Western Rail Plan, announced as a key policy of the 2018 Victorian state election by then-incumbent Premier of Victoria Daniel Andrews, also included quadruplication and electrification to Melton.

In 2023, it was widely speculated that the Western Rail Plan no longer included quadruplication. However, in 2025, a track diagram was released showing changes that will be made after the major upgrades planned for Sunshine Station. According to the diagram, quadruplication is planned to occur between a junction site near Caroline Springs and Sunshine; the new tracks will run into a new pair of platforms at Sunshine. The tracks at Sunshine will be reconfigured to route the future electrified Melton service through the Metro Tunnel.

=== Introduction of 9-car VLocity trains ===
In 2022, former Premier Daniel Andrews announced plans to extend the platforms on the line from Bacchus Marsh to Ardeer to allow 9-car VLocity trains to run. In 2024, the Level Crossing Removal Project announced plans to "investigate" constructing a train stabling facility in Cobblebank to "support the introduction of 9-car trains". In 2025, it was announced that the platform extensions were fast-tracked for completion in 2027, however, Bacchus Marsh and Ardeer will not be included. The train stabling facility in Cobblebank will be "future-proofed" for electrification.

=== Introduction of Bi-Mode hybrid electric trains ===
In September 2026 leading up to the 2026 Victorian state election, the Victorian Liberal Party made an election promise to order 25 new Bi-Mode hybrid electric trains at a cost of $1.7 billion. These hybrid electric trains would be able to run up to Melton and would be able to run on both on country tracks and electrified suburban tracks, making this an interim solution for electrification.

=== Planned stations ===
Several new stations are proposed to be built on the line, primarily to serve new housing estates. In 2016, the Victorian Planning Authority released the Paynes Road Precinct Structure Plan, which included plans for a train station in Thornhill Park (west of Rockbank) to support a new housing development in the area.

In 2020, another Precinct Structure Plan released by the Victorian Planning Authority included plans for a station in Mount Atkinson, west of Caroline Springs. In 2024, a petition submitted to the Parliament of Victoria calling for the station to be built attracted over 1,700 signatures.

== Former branch lines ==
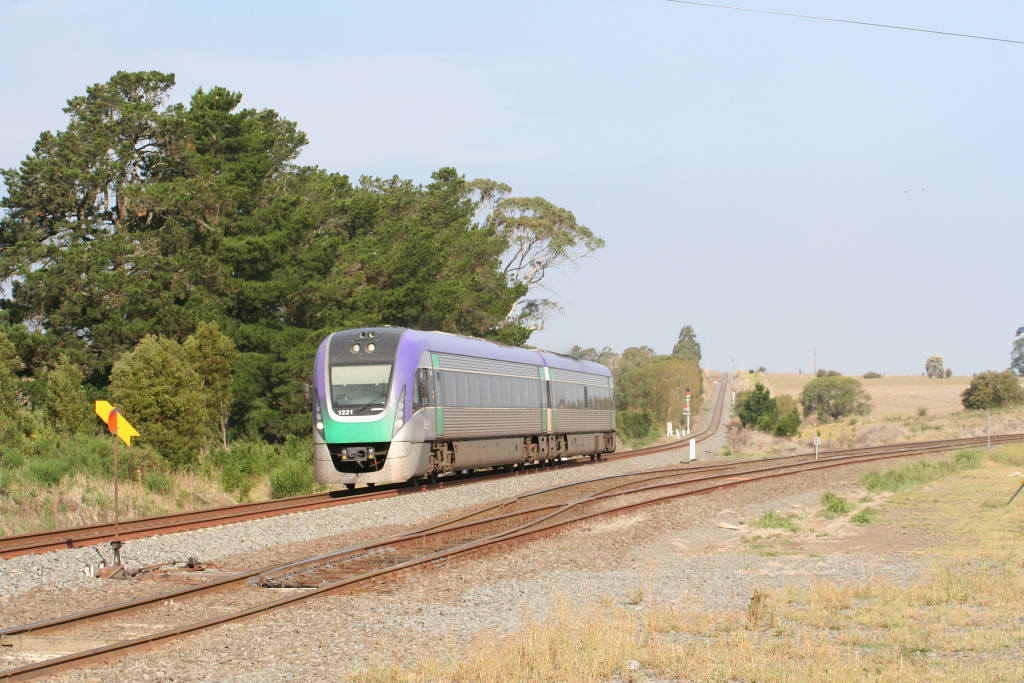
V/Line VLocity train at the junction with the Melbourne-Ballarat line at Warrenheip

=== Ballarat region ===
A branch line was built from Ballarat to Newtown and Skipton in 1883. This line closed in 1985. A branch was built between Newtown, Cressy and Irrewarra (east of Colac) about 1910. This line was closed in 1953.

A branch line was built from Linton junction to the Ballarat Cattle Yards and Redan in 1886. This line was closed in 1997.

=== Ararat region ===
Until 1993, two daily V/Line services ran from Melbourne to Dimboola, as well as the nightly The Overland service from Melbourne to Adelaide. Under the Kennett Government's economic reforms, the V/Line service to Dimboola was cut back to Ararat, with the towns beyond now served by coaches. The Ararat−Serviceton section was converted to standard gauge and reopened as part of the Western standard gauge railway line in 1995, which makes reinstatement of train services beyond Ararat unlikely.

The Overland service is now operated by Journey Beyond and runs on the Western standard gauge railway line, serving only some stations between Southern Cross and Adelaide Parklands Terminal.

A branch line was built from Lubeck (between Stawell and Murtoa) to Rupanyup in 1887, extended to Marnoo by 1909, and to Bolangum in the 1927. It closed in 1983.

A branch line was opened from Murtoa to Warracknabeal in 1886 and extended to Beulah in 1893, Roseberry and Hopetoun in 1894 and Patchewollock in 1927. The section from Hopetoun to Patchewollock was closed in the 1980s. The line from Murtoa to Hopetoun was converted to standard gauge in 1995. It has not carried passengers for many years and grain services between Roseberry to Hopetoun were suspended in 2005.

A branch line was completed between Horsham, East Natimuk and Noradjuha in 1887, and progressively extended to Balmoral by 1920, where it connected with a line from Cavendish to Hamilton. The whole line, from Noradjuha to Hamilton, was closed in 1979. A branch was opened from East Natimuk to Goroke in 1894, and extended further west to Carpolac in 1927. It closed in 1986.

A branch was opened from Dimboola to Jeparit in 1894 and extended to Rainbow in 1899 and Yaapeet in 1914. The line was converted to standard gauge in 1995. The line was deemed unusable after severe flooding in January 2011. The Victorian Government announced that they would contribute $5.3 million to restoring the line from Dimboola to Rainbow in 2011.

In 1905, a branch line was opened from Stawell to the Heatherlie quarry in The Grampians, from which large amounts of high-quality freestone were railed, to be used in a number of significant building projects. The branch was closed in 1949.

Another branch line, from Jeparit to Lorquon, was opened in 1912, and was extended to Yanac in 1916. It closed in 1986.

A line was built from Ararat to Portland in 1877, via Maroona, Hamilton, and Heywood. A number of branch lines were built from this line, none of which are in use today. This line was converted to standard gauge in 1995; up to Maroona it forms part of the Western standard gauge railway line, where it junctions with section of the line towards North Shore. The Portland line saw further upgrades as part of the Murray Basin Rail Project, connecting it to the Mildura line via the Ararat-, which was converted to standard gauge also as part of the MBRP.

== References in popular culture ==
The Tom Waits song Town with No Cheer from the 1982 album Swordfishtrombones refers to Serviceton, The Overland train, and the railway line's disuse.
