= Pirron Yallock railway station =

Former railway station in Victoria, Australia

Coordinates: 38°21′52″S 143°25′19″E

Pirron Yallock

General information
- Line: Warrnambool
- Platforms: 1 (formerly 2)
- Tracks: 1 (formerly 3)

Other information
- Status: Closed

History
- Closed: 4 October 1981

Services
Preceding station	V/Line	Following station
Colac towards Southern Cross	Warrnambool line	Camperdown towards Warrnambool
List of closed railway stations in Victoria
Location

Pirron Yallock is a closed station located just west of the town of Pirron Yallock on the Warrnambool railway line in Victoria, Australia. The station building is located at the station, but the platform has been demolished.

As well as the main station building, the station precinct had several sidings, a small goods (freight) platform, and a goods shed. There was also a livestock siding with unloading facilities and stockyards. Pirron Yallock had an adjacent racecourse, and the station was quite busy at race times with trains conveying racegoers to these events with "special" race trains operating from Ballarat and Melbourne – Pirron Yallock had the first Victorian "Totalizator" outside Melbourne. There were locomotive servicing facilities – a locomotive watering tower for steam locomotives remains on site.

A station master's residence was located in the precinct. Several railway houses were also where gangers and trackworkers were employed and permanently located at Pirron Yallock.

Passengers desiring to join a train after the officer in charge had ceased duties were required to exhibit the red flag during daylight or light a red lamp in darkness to stop the train and obtain tickets from the guard.

Due to its heritage significance, the station building was renovated quite sometime after closing. However, it stands lonely as a testament to gamble roofing.

The station was also an important crossing point for trains to and from Melbourne and Warrnambool, with a long crossing loop adjacent to the station building. The precinct was protected by two semaphore home signals, one on the upside and one on the downside.

The station was one of 35 closed to passenger traffic on 4 October 1981 as part of the New Deal for Country Passengers.
