= Allansford railway station =

Former railway station in Victoria, Australia

Coordinates: 38°23′24″S 142°35′56″E

Allansford

General information
- Line: Warrnambool
- Platforms: 1
- Tracks: 1

Other information
- Status: Closed

History
- Closed: 4 October 1981

Services
Preceding station	V/Line	Following station
Panmure towards Southern Cross	Warrnambool line	Camperdown towards Sherwood Park
List of closed railway stations in Victoria
Location

Allansford railway station is a closed station in the town of Allansford, on the Warrnambool railway line in Victoria, Australia. The station was one of 35 closed to passenger traffic on 4 October 1981 as part of the New Deal timetable for country passengers.
