= North Shore railway station =

Railway station in Geelong, Victoria, Australia

North Shore
- Northbound view from the island platform in October 2026

General information
- Location: Station Street, North Shore, Victoria 3214; City of Greater Geelong; Australia
- Coordinates: 38°05′53″S 144°21′56″E
- System: PTV regional and Journey Beyond inter-city rail station
- Owner: VicTrack
- Operator: V/Line
- Lines: Geelong Warrnambool (Warrnambool); The Overland (Western SG)
- Distance: 67.17 kilometres from Southern Cross
- Platforms: 3 (1 island, 1 side)
- Tracks: 7
- Train operators: V/Line; Journey Beyond
- Connections: Bus

Construction
- Structure type: Ground
- Parking: Yes
- Cycle facilities: Yes
- Accessible: Yes

Other information
- Status: Operational, unstaffed
- Station code: NSH
- Fare zone: Myki zone 3/4
- Website: Public Transport Victoria

History
- Opened: 15 April 1895; 131 years ago
- Rebuilt: 8 February 1959; 1991; May 1999
- Former names: Corio (1909-1913); Pivot (proposed)

Passengers
- 2013-2014: 34,237
- 2014-2015: 38,363 ▲12.05%
- 2015-2016: 45,401 ▲18.34%
- 2016-2017: 50,852 ▲12%

Services
Preceding station	V/Line	Following station
Corio towards Southern Cross	Geelong line	North Geelong towards Geelong or Waurn Ponds
Lara towards Southern Cross	Geelong line Some weekday peak services	North Geelong towards Geelong or Waurn Ponds
Corio towards Southern Cross	Warrnambool line One service per night	North Geelong One-way operation
Preceding station	Journey Beyond	Following station
Ararat towards Adelaide	The Overland	Melbourne Terminus
Location
- Location within Victoria

North Shore railway station is a regional railway station operated by V/Line on the Geelong and Warrnambool lines, part of the Victoria rail network. It serves the northern Geelong suburb of North Shore, in Victoria, Australia. The station opened on 15 April 1895, with the current platform provided in February 1959, the shelters on the island platform provided in 1991 and a shorter Platform 3 for The Overland provided in May 1999.

North Shore is a ground-level unstaffed station, featuring three platforms, one island platform with two faces and one side platform. Platforms 1 and 2 are used for regular broad gauge V/Line services and the shorter Platform 3 is used for The Overland passenger service to Adelaide and Western standard gauge line for freight trains to Adelaide.

This station was renamed two times. When it first opened in 1895, it was named North Shore. It was renamed Corio on 27 September 1909 before again being named North Shore on 1 December 1913.

North Shore is the junction for the Western standard gauge line to Adelaide and the Warrnambool line.

== History ==
Although some references say the station opened on 15 April 1895, an 1857 map shows a station named Cowies Creek on the current site which, by the 1880s was called North Shore. The level crossing at the station was protected by hand-operated gates until the mid-1890s, when the gatekeeper was withdrawn as an economy measure. The gatekeeper's cottage was retained as a residence for other railway employees.

In 1909, the station was briefly renamed Corio, reverting to North Shore in 1913. In the 1920s, various other names, related to the industrial expansion in the area, were suggested for the station, including Jelbart, Pivot and Ford. In 1930, the Minister for Railways announced that the station's name would change to Pivot, but the name changed never proceeded.

In 1939, flashing light signals were provided at the Station Street level crossing, located nearby in the down direction from the station, with boom barriers provided on in 1984.

In the early 1950s, the station was reduced to being staffed by a caretaker, responsible to the stationmaster at Corio. In February 1959, the former single line was duplicated from North Geelong to Corio, and North Shore was re-built as an island platform, 200 metres to the north of the old station. The previous group of standard country railway buildings was replaced by a small wooden office and waiting room. After being damaged by fire in 1990, the building was replaced by two metal bus shelters.

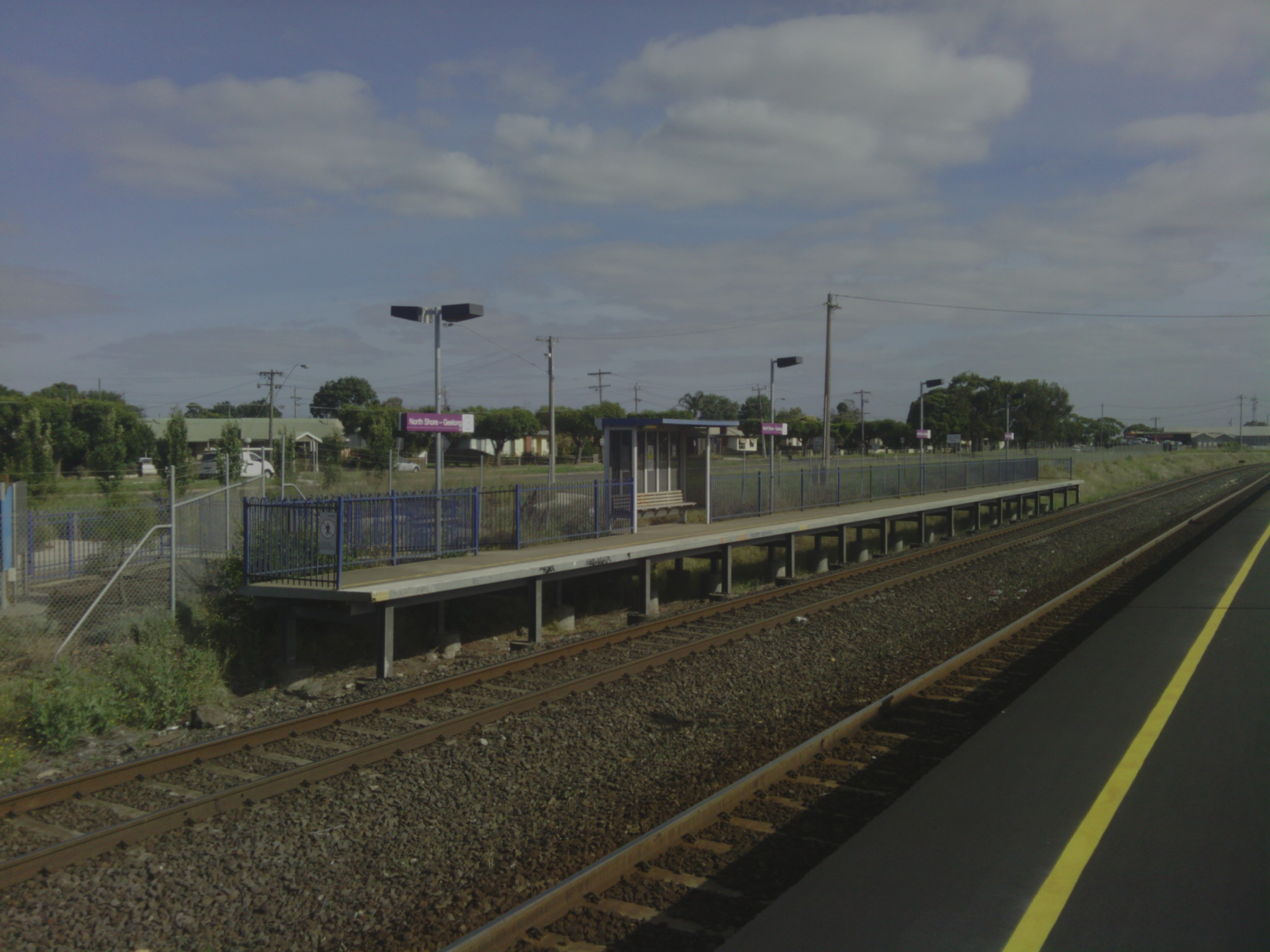
North-west bound view of Platform 3, on the Western standard gauge line, January 2015

In 1995, the Western standard gauge line was built to the west of the station, and is mostly used by freight trains to and from Adelaide. In May 1999, a short platform was provided for The Overland passenger service to Adelaide.

A kilometre south of North Shore, the North Geelong Loop, first opened in 1903, connects the Melbourne – Geelong and Geelong – Ballarat lines.

In 2016, the station gained minor notoriety after it was revealed that an amateur porn video had been shot at the location by two Geelong teenagers. Station operator V/Line became aware of the film, entitled ''Trainline Tramp'', in November, and a spokesman condemned the film makers' actions in the strongest possible terms.

== Platforms and services ==
North Shore has one island platform with two faces on the broad gauge lines, and one side platform on the Western standard gauge line. It is served by V/Line Geelong line services and one Warrnambool line service to Southern Cross (each night) on the broad gauge lines. It is also serviced by Journey Beyond The Overland services on the standard gauge line.

North Shore platform arrangement
Platform	Line	Destination	Via	Notes
1	Geelong line Warrnambool line	Southern Cross	Wyndham Vale	
2	Geelong line	Geelong, South Geelong, Marshall, Waurn Ponds	Geelong	Services to South Geelong and Marshall only operate on weekdays.
3	The Overland	Melbourne - Southern Cross		
3	The Overland	Adelaide	Ararat	

== Transport links ==
CDC Geelong operates three bus routes via North Shore station, under contract to Public Transport Victoria:

- 1 : to Deakin University Waurn Ponds Campus
- 22 : to Geelong station
- 23 : Corio Shopping Centre – North Shore
