= North Geelong railway station =

Railway station in Geelong, Victoria, Australia

North Geelong
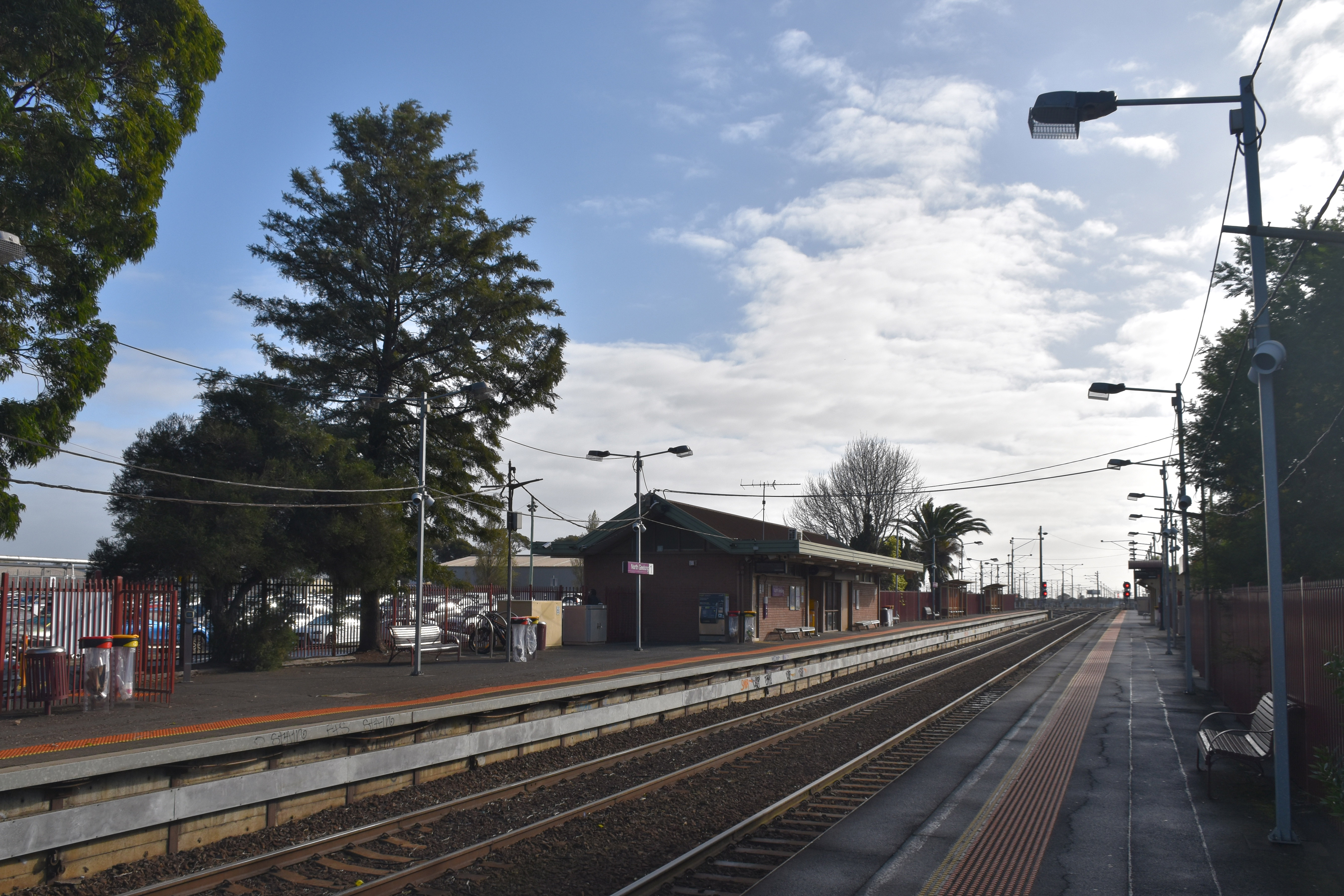
- Northbound view from Platform 2, August 2023

General information
- Location: Princes Highway, North Geelong, Victoria 3215; City of Greater Geelong; Australia
- Coordinates: 38°07′20″S 144°21′09″E
- System: PTV regional rail station
- Owner: VicTrack
- Operator: V/Line
- Lines: Geelong Warrnambool (Warrnambool)
- Distance: 69.98 kilometres from Southern Cross
- Platforms: 2 side
- Tracks: 2
- Connections: Bus

Construction
- Structure type: Ground
- Parking: 486
- Cycle facilities: Yes
- Accessible: Yes

Other information
- Status: Operational, staffed part-time
- Station code: NOG
- Fare zone: Myki zone 3/4
- Website: Public Transport Victoria

History
- Opened: 1 August 1883; 143 years ago
- Rebuilt: 8 August 1990; 2008
- Former names: West Geelong (1883-1885)

Passengers
- 2013-2014: 267,572
- 2014-2015: 276,464 ▲3.32%
- 2015-2016: 295,937 ▲7.04%
- 2016-2017: 308,516 ▲4.25%

Services
Preceding station	V/Line	Following station
North Shore towards Southern Cross	Geelong line	Geelong towards South Geelong or Waurn Ponds
Footscray One-way operation	Warrnambool line One weekday evening service	Geelong towards Warrnambool
North Shore towards Southern Cross	Warrnambool line One service per night	Geelong One-way operation
Location
- Location within Victoria

North Geelong railway station is a regional railway station operated by V/Line on the Geelong and Warrnambool lines, part of the Victoria rail network. It serves the northern Geelong suburb of North Geelong, in Victoria, Australia. North Geelong is a ground-level part-time staffed station, featuring two side platforms. The station opened on 1 August 1883, with the current station building on Platform 1 provided in 1990 and a metal shelter on Platform 2 provided in 2008.

Initially opened as West Geelong, the station was given its current name on 1 January 1886.

The station is the junction of the Geelong–Ballarat and Warrnambool lines. The North Geelong rail yards are north of the station.

== History ==
After a rearrangement of the Ballarat line junction in 1907, the platform on the west side was removed, and all trains used the one platform. A further reorganisation in 1920 saw the second platform restored.

In 1973, the former Victoria Street level crossing, which was at the down (southern) end of the station, was replaced by the Margaret Street overpass and a pedestrian underpass. In 1976, both platforms were extended by over 60 metres, and the platforms and platform facings were renewed in 1979. The main station building on Platform 1 was opened on 8 August 1990 and, in 2008, the smaller building on Platform 2 was replaced by a metal shelter.

In January 2019, the North Geelong "C" signal box, one of the few remaining mechanical signal boxes in Victoria, was abolished, and a project was begun to automatically signal the lines it formerly controlled.

== Platforms and services ==
North Geelong has two side platforms and is served by V/Line Geelong line services, as well as selected Warrnambool line services.

North Geelong platform arrangement
Platform	Line	Destination	Stopping Pattern	Notes
1	Geelong line Warrnambool line	Southern Cross	All stations and limited express services	
2	Geelong line Warrnambool line	Geelong, South Geelong, Marshall, Waurn Ponds, Warrnambool	All stations and limited express services	Services to Geelong, South Geelong and Marshall only operate on weekdays.

== Transport links ==
CDC Geelong operates two bus routes via North Geelong station, under contract to Public Transport Victoria:

- 20 : Geelong station – Corio Shopping Centre
- 24 : to Geelong station
