= Corio railway station =

Railway station in Geelong, Victoria, Australia

Corio
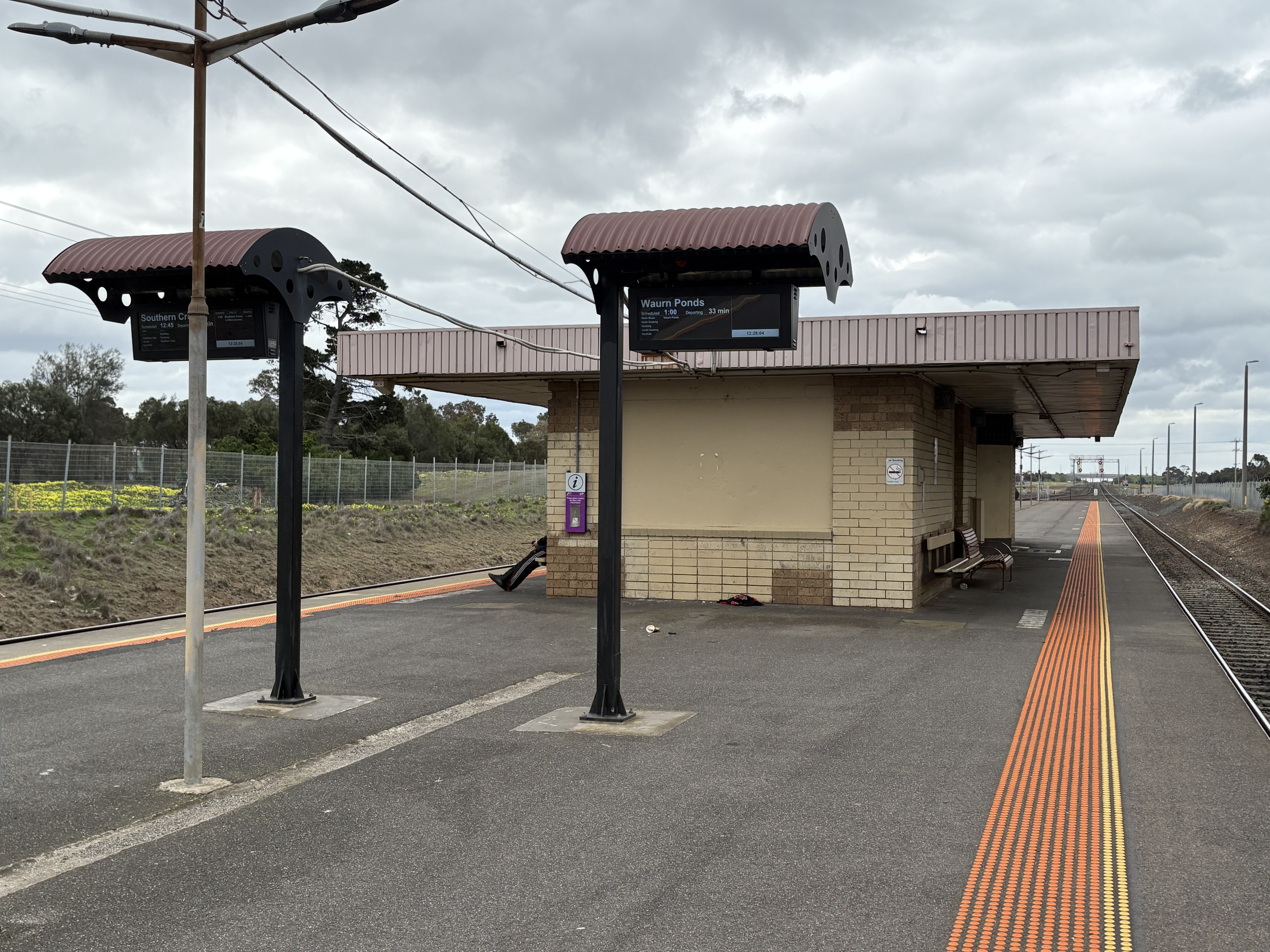
- Northbound view from Platform 2, September 2025

General information
- Location: School Road, Corio, Victoria 3214; City of Greater Geelong; Australia
- Coordinates: 38°04′19″S 144°22′48″E
- System: PTV regional rail station
- Owner: VicTrack
- Operator: V/Line
- Lines: Geelong Warrnambool (Warrnambool)
- Distance: 63.94 kilometres from Southern Cross
- Platforms: 2 (1 island)
- Tracks: 2

Construction
- Structure type: Ground
- Parking: Yes
- Cycle facilities: Yes
- Accessible: Yes

Other information
- Status: Operational, unstaffed
- Station code: COR
- Fare zone: Myki zone 3/4
- Website: Public Transport Victoria

History
- Opened: 15 September 1890; 136 years ago
- Rebuilt: 8 January 1914; 9 September 1981
- Former names: Cowie's Creek (1890-1904); Cowie (1904-1913)

Services
Preceding station	V/Line	Following station
Lara towards Southern Cross	Geelong line	North Shore towards Geelong or Waurn Ponds
Lara towards Southern Cross	Warrnambool line One service per night	North Shore One-way operation
Location
- Location within Victoria

Corio railway station is a regional railway station operated by V/Line on the Geelong and Warrnambool lines, part of the Victoria rail network. It serves the northern Geelong suburb of Corio, in Victoria, Australia. Corio is a ground-level unstaffed station, featuring an island platform with two faces. The station opened on 15 September 1890, with the current station provided in September 1981.

Initially opened as Cowie's Creek, the station was renamed two times. It became Cowie on 9 May 1904, and was given its current name on 1 December 1913.

The Western standard gauge line to Adelaide runs immediately west of the station.

Although located in Corio, the station is situated about a kilometre from the nearest residential developments in the area.

== History ==
A siding just north of the School Road level crossing was opened in April 1912, and a tramway was constructed from there to the new Corio site of Geelong Grammar School, to facilitate the carting of building materials. At the end of 1913, the station was moved 400 metres down the line, in conjunction with the establishment of a crossing loop on the single track. The relocation of Geelong Grammar School to its new site on 8 January 1914 helped to increase the station's importance. A station-master's residence was constructed, and a station-master and assistant station-master were appointed.

In the early 1950s, Corio's role was boosted by the construction of the Shell Geelong refinery, with its associated sidings, immediately adjacent to the station. In February 1959, the line from North Geelong to Corio was duplicated. When duplication was extended to Lara on 9 September 1981, a new island platform and station building were provided.

In 1964, flashing light signals were provided at the School Road level crossing, located nearby in the up direction of the station, with boom barriers provided later on in 1981.

On 4 January 2001, Corio was de-staffed.

== Platforms and services ==
Corio has one island platform with two faces and is served by V/Line Geelong line and selected Warrnambool line trains.

Corio platform arrangement
Platform	Line	Destination	Stopping Pattern	Notes
1	Geelong line Warrnambool line	Southern Cross	All stations and limited express services	
2	Geelong line	Geelong, South Geelong, Waurn Ponds	All stations and limited express services	Services to Geelong and South Geelong only operate on weekdays.
