= Panmure railway station, Victoria =

Former railway station in Victoria, Australia

Coordinates: 38°20′33″S 142°43′13″E

Panmure

General information
- Line: Warrnambool
- Platforms: 1
- Tracks: 1

Other information
- Status: Closed

History
- Closed: 4 October 1981

Former services
Preceding station	V/Line	Following station
Terang towards Southern Cross	Warrnambool line	Allansford towards Warrnambool
List of closed railway stations in Victoria
Location

Panmure was a railway station in the town of Panmure, on the Warrnambool railway line in Victoria, Australia. The station was one of 35 closed to passenger traffic on 4 October 1981 as part of the New Deal for Country Passengers.
