= Panmure railway station =

Panmure railway station may refer to:

- Panmure railway station, Auckland, on the Eastern Line of the Auckland railway network in New Zealand
- Panmure railway station, Victoria, closed 1981, on the Warrnambool line in Australia
