= Geelong Racecourse =

Horse racing venue in Geelong, Victoria, Australia

Coordinates: 38.1743°S 144.3757°E

The Geelong Racecourse is a major regional horse racing venue in Geelong, Victoria, Australia. The current racecourse dates to 1908. The annual Geelong Cup is held at the course every October, as well as a number of other race meetings through the year.

== History ==
The first race meeting in Geelong was on 1 May 1841, at Corio. Three races were held on the day. The next race meeting was held at "Airey's Flat", on the banks the Moorabool River near Fyansford. In 1849, a start was made on a proper racecourse, with 727 acres (2.94 km^{2}) of land beside the Barwon River at Marshalltown chosen. Situated close to Lake Connewarre, the land was subject to frequent flooding.

The Geelong Racing Club was formed in 1866, and held its first race meeting on 18 and 19 January 1866. 23 February 1872 saw the first Geelong Cup held at the Marshalltown course, where a new grandstand was opened. A railway branch line was provided to the course in 1878.

In 1907, it was decided to relocate the Geelong Racecourse and the Geelong Showgrounds to their current site on Breakwater Road, East Geelong. The first race meeting was held at the new venue in March 1908, with the first Geelong Racing Club meeting being held there on 12 December 1908. A makeshift rail platform for racegoers was provided on the Queenscliff railway line, but the railway authorities vetoed its use after a year or so. As an alternative, the Geelong Racecourse railway station was constructed on the Warrnambool line. The Geelong Racing Club, the Geelong Agricultural Society and the Hibernian Society together paid the Victorian Railways £1000 to have the station built.

The course itself has seen a number of upgrades, the most recent being the provision of a third grandstand and improvements to the track itself.
