= Geelong Racecourse railway station =

Former railway station in Breakwater, Victoria

Geelong Racecourse
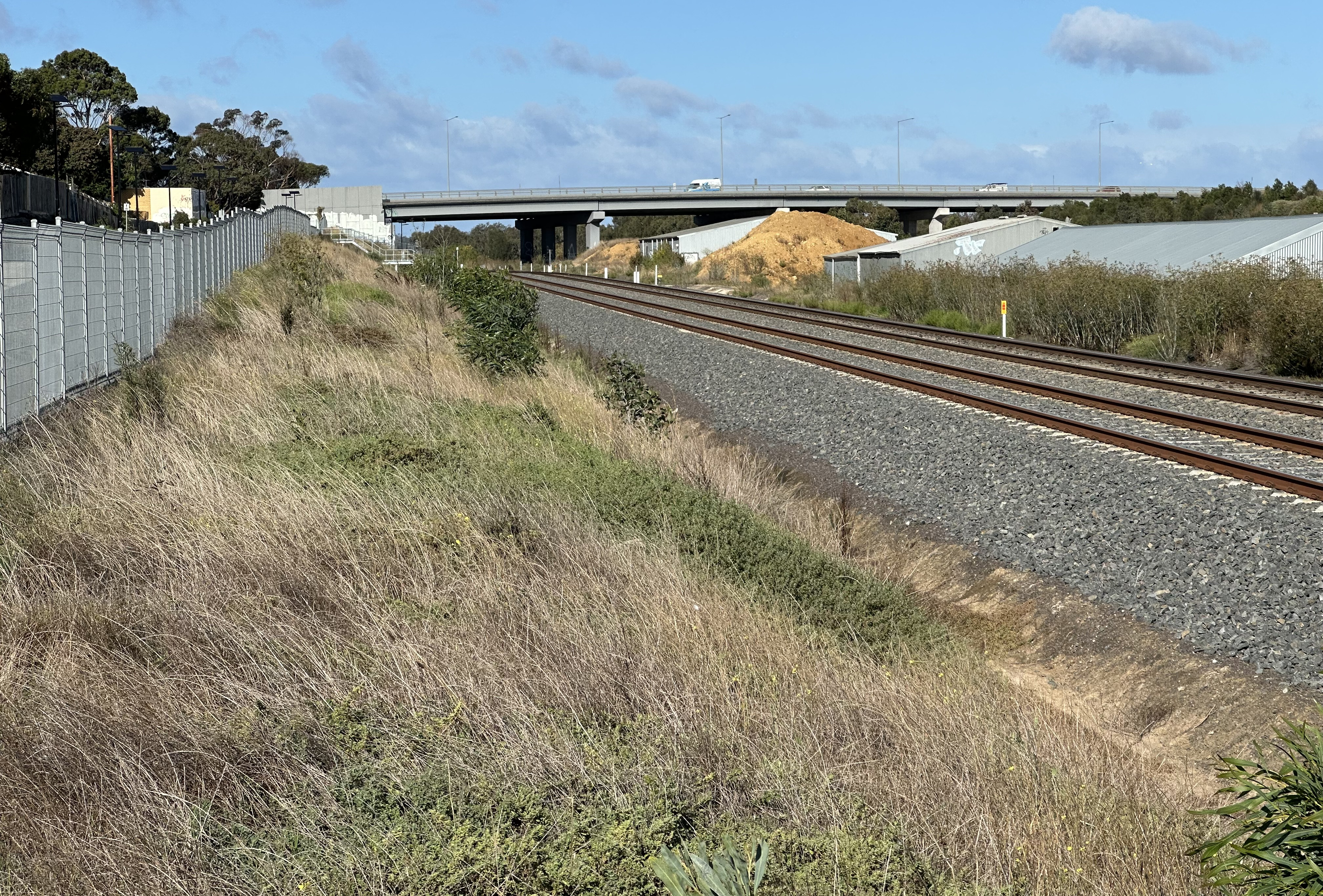
- Southbound view at former station site in April 2026

General information
- Other names: Geelong Showgrounds (1910–1915)
- Coordinates: 38°10′35″S 144°22′05″E
- Lines: Geelong, Warrnambool
- Platforms: 1
- Tracks: 2

Other information
- Status: Closed

History
- Opened: 14 December 1910
- Closed: 1 March 2011

Services
Preceding station	V/Line	Following station
South Geelong towards Southern Cross	Geelong line	Marshall Terminus
Location

Geelong Racecourse (sometimes stylised as Geelong Race Course and also known as Breakwater) was a railway station on the Geelong-Warrnambool railway line in the Geelong suburb of Breakwater, Victoria. It was located on a loop siding off the main line and was only used for special events at the nearby Geelong Racecourse.

== History ==
In 1910, the Geelong Racing Club, the Geelong Agricultural Society and the Hibernian Society together paid the Victorian Railways £1000 to have the station built. It was first used for the race meeting held on Wednesday 14 December of that year. The new station replaced one on the Queenscliff railway line, which was further from the racecourse. When it first opened, it was known as Geelong Showgrounds. It was renamed Geelong Racecourse in March 1915.

By the start of 1918, an electric staff instrument was provided. In 1942, a dead-end extension at the down end of the station was abolished, and in 1956, the electric staff instrument and a switching facility was abolished. In 1962, all signals at the station were abolished.

By December 2001, the loop was booked out of service, and was only booked back in service once a year, for the Geelong Cup. The last V/Line service to stop there was for the 2005 Geelong Cup. In 2005, the points from the main line were spiked, preventing trains from accessing the platform. In May 2007, a small timber hut, which was the only building on the platform, was demolished.

In February 2011, the loop siding was disconnected from the main line, in conjunction with the re-sleepering of the main line. On 1 March of that year, the loop siding was abolished, effectively closing the station.

== See also ==
- List of closed railway stations in Victoria
- Werribee Racecourse railway station
- Williamstown Racecourse railway station
