= Pirron Yallock =

- Town
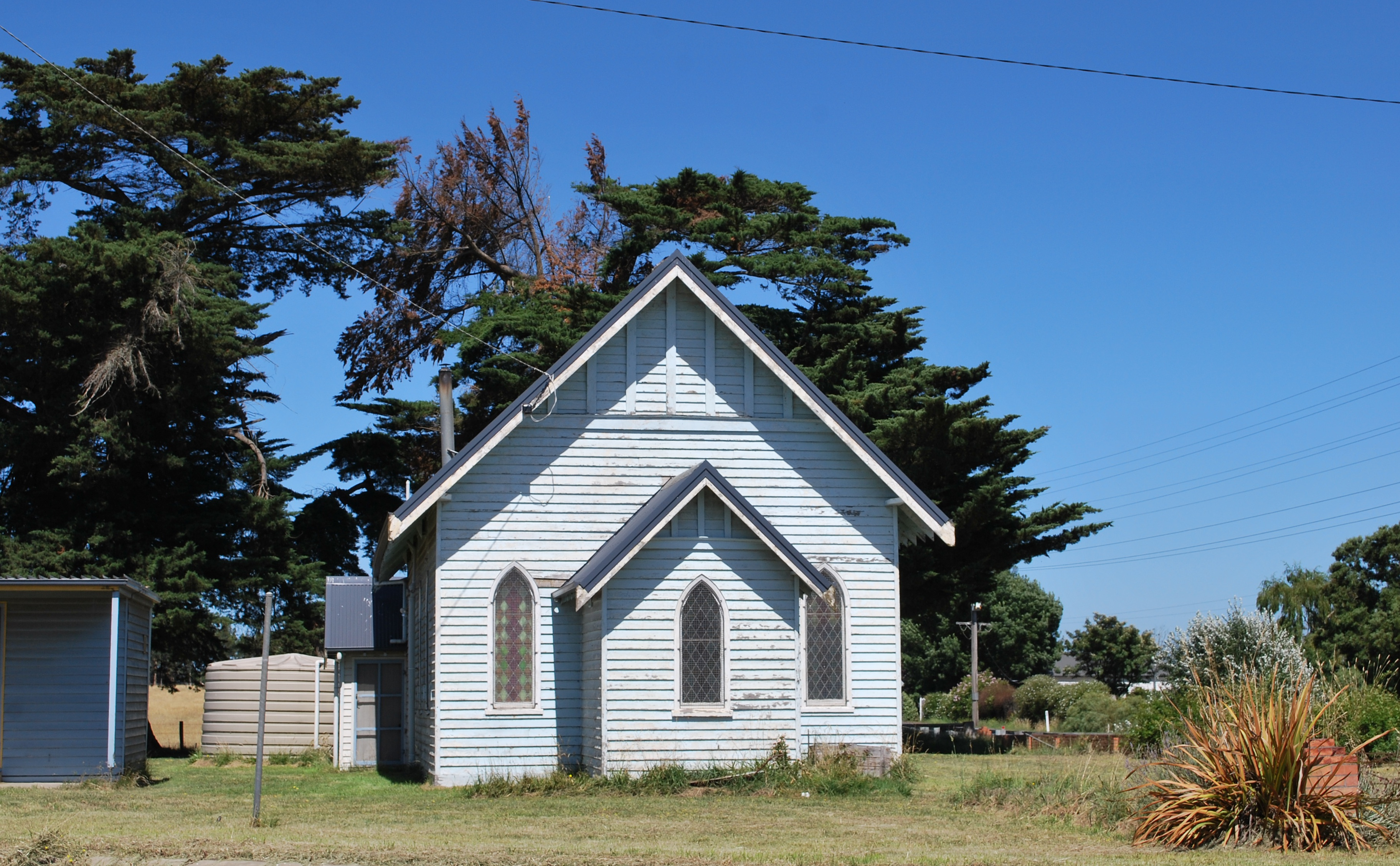
- A church in Pirron Yallock

- Coordinates: 38°20′12″S 143°23′31″E
- Country: Australia
- State: Victoria
- LGAs: Colac Otway Shire; Corangamite Shire

Government
  - State electorate: Polwarth
  - Federal division: Wannon

Population
  - Total: 113 (2016 census)

Pirron Yallock is a town in western Victoria, Australia. It is located on the Princes Highway (route A1), where route C163 branches off towards Timboon and Nullawarre. Pirron Yallock is on the banks of Pirron Yallock Creek, which flows into Lake Corangamite.

Pirron Yallock state school celebrated its centenary in 1974.

Pirron Yallock was served by the Pirron Yallock railway station on the Warrnambool railway line, until the station was closed in 1981.

Pirron Yallock Post Office opened on 12 July 1872, was renamed Pirron Yaloak on 21 June 1965, and closed on 31 October 1973.

The Pirron Yallock racecourse was the first place in Victoria to legally operate a totalizator, at the race meeting on 2 May 1931.
