= Geelong Showgrounds =

Coordinates: 38.1705°S 144.3744°E

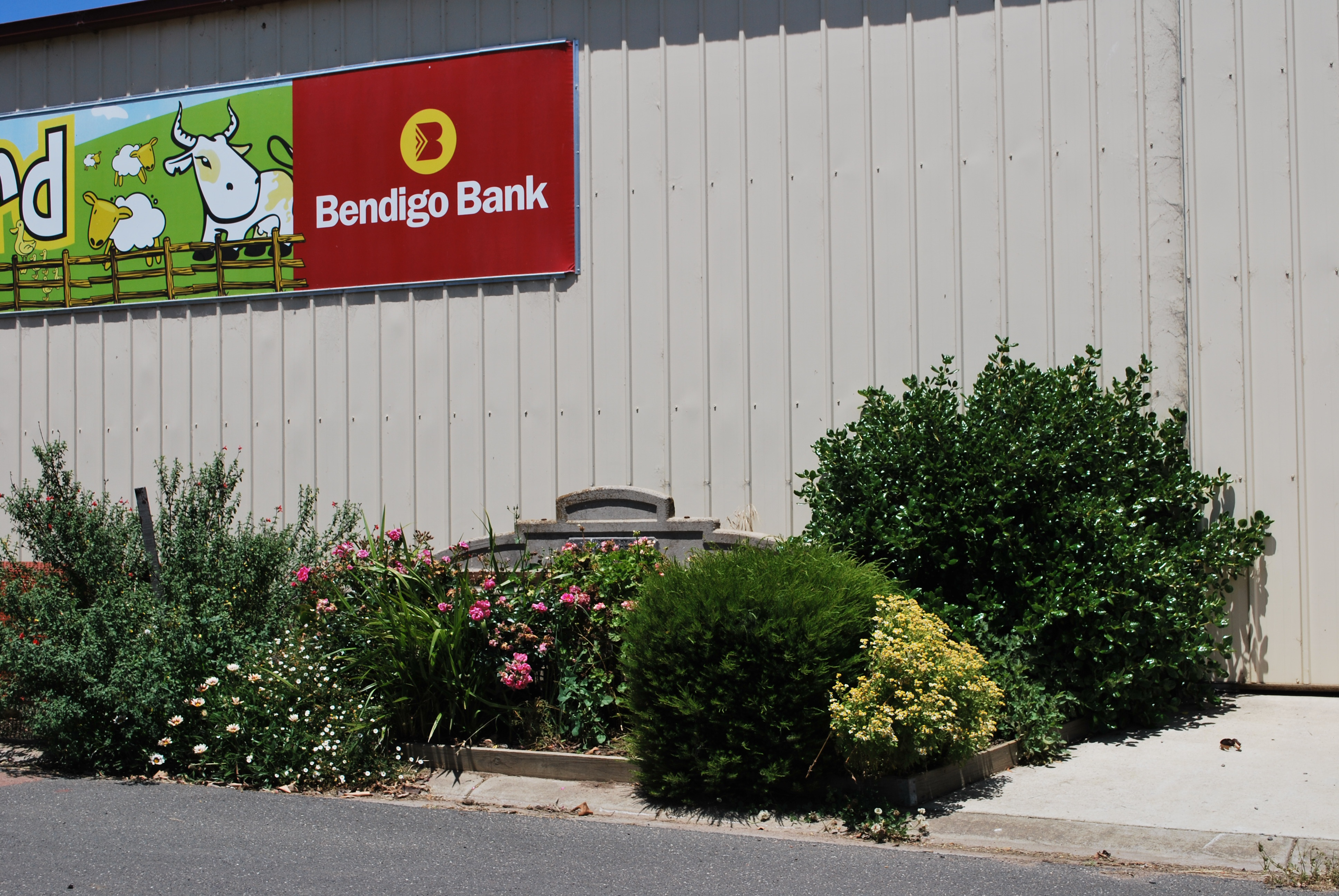
A Bills horse trough at the showgrounds

The Geelong Showgrounds in Geelong, Victoria, Australia, are the home of the Royal Geelong Show, an agricultural show held every year since 1855. The current showgrounds are located in the suburb of Breakwater.

The focus of the Royal Geelong Show is the display of rural industry, including livestock and produce, with associated competitions and awards. The show also features amusement rides, a sideshow alley, and showbags, carry bags full of goodies produced by various commercial enterprises.

== History ==
The Geelong and Western District Agricultural and Horticultural Society was formed in February 1855. The first showgrounds site was in East Geelong, south of Eastern Park. It was bounded by Ryrie, Garden, Myers and Normanby Streets. The second showgrounds opened in October 1891, on a new site that ran south from Ormond Road to St Albans Road. A 40-metre-long wooden grandstand was provided.

In 1907, the showgrounds were again moved, this time to the new Geelong Racecourse. On 14 April 1907, Messrs McCoy and Son transported the grandstand from the old site. Weighing 100 tonnes, it was moved across the Queenscliff railway line by a traction engine, after being placed on 52 large rollers. The stand remained at the current racecourse until at least the early 1990s.

The agricultural society shared the Geelong Racecourse until 1954, when it moved to the current site.
