= Grovedale railway station =

Grovedale

General information
- Coordinates: 38°12′39.88″S 144°20′19.23″E
- Line: Port Fairy
- Platforms: 1
- Tracks: 1

Other information
- Status: Closed

History
- Opened: 25 November 1876
- Closed: 1 January 1954
- Former names: Germantown
Location

Grovedale was a railway station on the outskirts of Geelong, located on the Warrnambool railway line in Victoria, Australia. Located near the current Torquay Road (Surfcoast Highway) level crossing, the station opened in 1876 as Germantown and was renamed Grovedale in February 1916.

== Reuse of name ==
In the early 2000s the Victoria State Government used the 'Grovedale' name when proposing a new railway station to serve the southern suburbs of Geelong. In December 2003 Marshalltown Road was selected as the site, with the name of the station being changed in September 2004 to Marshall, for the station that was originally located on the site. This station opened to passengers as 'Marshall' in 2004.

In April 2013 the State Government used the Grovedale name to announce an additional railway station in southern Geelong, this time located in the suburb of Waurn Ponds. The name of the future station being changed in July 2014 to Waurn Ponds, and it opened to passengers as 'Waurn Ponds' in October 2014.
