= Warrnambool line =

Passenger rail service in Victoria, Australia

Warrnambool

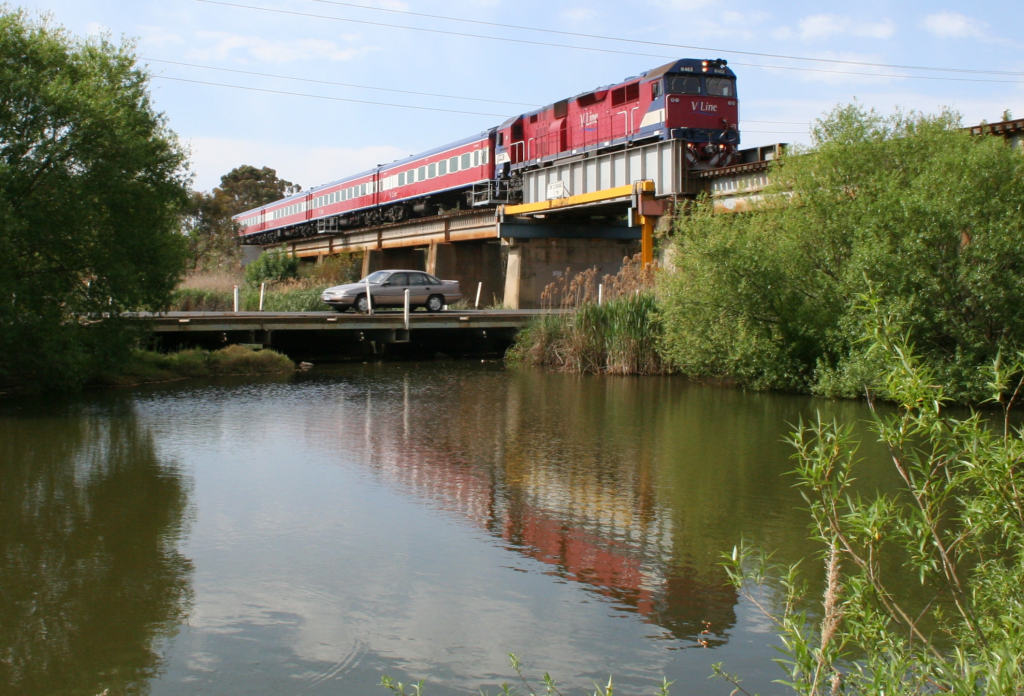
- V/Line train crossing the Barwon River in Geelong

Overview
- Service type: Regional rail
- System: Victorian railway network
- Status: Operational
- Locale: Victoria, Australia
- Predecessor: Winchelsea (1876–1877); Colac (1877–1883); Camperdown (1883–1887); Terang (1887–1890); Port Fairy (1890–1977); The Flyer ^ (1927–c. 1967); The Westcoaster (1987–c. 2004)^ outbound only
- First service: 25 November 1876; 149 years ago
- Current operator: V/Line
- Former operators: Victorian Railways (VR) (1876–1974); VR as VicRail (1974–1983); STA (V/Line) (1983–1989); PTC (V/Line) (1989–1993); West Coast Railway (1993–2004); V/Line Passenger (2004–2010)
- Annual ridership: 182,950 (2024-25)

Route
- Termini: Southern Cross; Warrnambool
- Stops: 21
- Distance travelled: 267.3 km (166.1 mi)
- Average journey time: 3 hours 37 minutes
- Service frequency: 5 express services weekdays; 3 express services weekend; 1 local service weekend
- Lines used: Serviceton, Deer Park–West Werribee, Port Fairy

On-board services
- Disabled access: Yes
- Seating arrangements: 2+2
- Baggage facilities: Overhead racks, dedicated luggage storage areas.

Technical
- Rolling stock: VLocity
- Track gauge: 1,600 mm (5 ft 3 in)
- Track owner: VicTrack

The Warrnambool line is a long-distance regional rail service in Victoria, Australia. Operated by V/Line, it is the state's fourth longest railway line at 267.3 kilometres (166.1 mi). The line runs from Southern Cross station in central Melbourne to Warrnambool station in the south-west, serving 21 stations via Wyndham Vale, Geelong, Waurn Ponds, and Colac. The line has five return services each weekday and four return services on weekends. Trains on the Warrnambool service run with three-car Vlocity units.

The service was taken over by V/Line after the closure of West Coast Railway in 2004. The track that the service operates on was originally built to connect Melbourne with the rural towns of Geelong, Colac, Warrnambool, and Port Fairy, amongst others. Sections of the Port Fairy line opened as early as 1857, with the line fully extended to Warrnambool in February 1890. A section of the line between Warrnambool and Port Fairy was closed in 1977 due to limited demand. Today V/Line only operates as far as Warrnambool.

Since the 2010s, there have been a number of upgrades to the line to improve the speed, accessibility and frequency of the service, including the Regional Rail Link, the Regional Rail Revival, and the planned Geelong Fast Rail project.

== History ==
=== 19th century ===
The line to Geelong was originally built by the Geelong and Melbourne Railway Company and opened on 25 June 1857, with the line being sold to the Victorian Railways in 1860. The line was designed by English engineer Edward Snell, and built as a single track. The line was later extended south-west, to Winchelsea in 1876, Colac in 1877, Camperdown in 1883, Terang in 1877, and finally Warrnambool, Dennington, and Port Fairy in 1890. The line is now closed beyond Warrnambool, with the last train leaving Port Fairy in September 1977.

=== 20th century ===
In the early 20th century, a similar service named "The Flyer" was introduced as an extension of the Geelong Flier to Port Fairy. The service shaved 90 minutes off the whole journey, compared with the schedule of its predecessors. This service was operated by the longer-distance E-class carriages and lasted until about 1967.

Whilst the track beyond Waurn Ponds station is mostly single with some passing loops, many duplication projects have occurred along the Geelong section of the line. The section from North Geelong to Geelong was duplicated late April 1922. 37 years later in 1959, the section of track from Corio to North Geelong was duplicated. In 1979 the track from Werribee to Little River was duplicated and the sections from Little River to Lara and Lara to Corio in 1981. The Regional Rail Revival project will duplicate the track from South Geelong to Waurn Ponds in late 2024.

In September 1977, the line beyond Warrnambool was closed, with the final service to Port Fairy being hauled by a Victorian Railways B75 locomotive on 12 September.

In the 1980s the Victorian Railways decided to give names to its flagship services, to follow on from the previously named "Vinelander" & "Gippslander", and "The Westcoaster" was born. It had buffet facilities on board and shaved minutes off the journey time

West Coast Railway was formed in 1993 when the Kennett government privatised long-distance country rail services previously run by the government-owned operator V/Line to private operators. Bids were lodged in February 1993 with West Coast Railway being announced as the successful tender on 30 April of the same year. The initial franchise was for eight years with operations commencing on 19 September 1993. The service continued using the name "The Westcoaster" until services were returned to V/Line operation and the name fell into disuse.

=== 21st century ===
In August 2001, Connex purchased a 50% shareholding of West Coast Railway. In 2003, Connex sold its shareholding to Australian Public Trustees. West Coast Railway continued to operate the line until 2004 when the contract was handed back the government with V/Line resuming operation of the line.

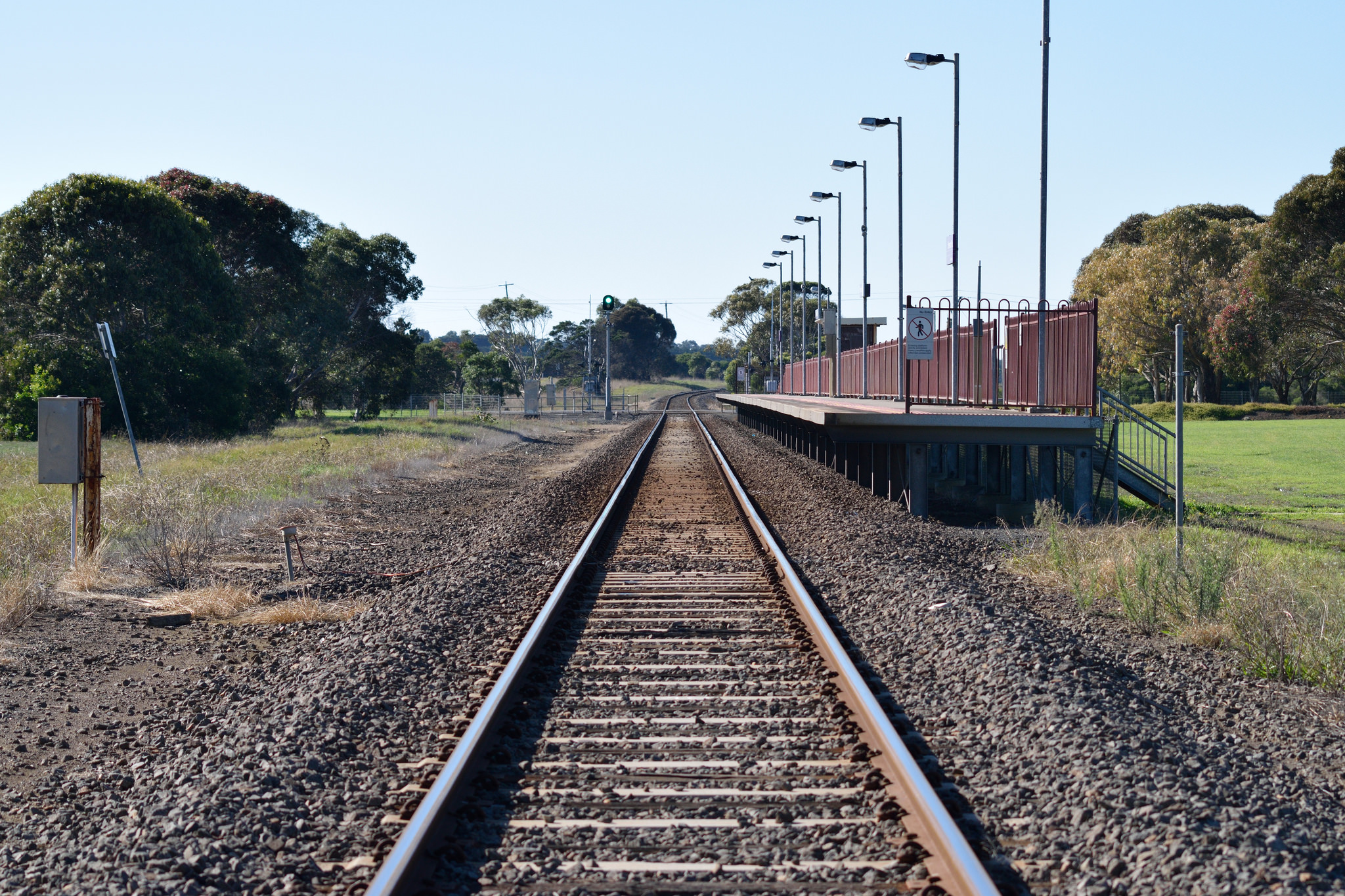
Sherwood Park station was one of 2 new stations to open in the early 2000s

Since transfer to V/Line, five new stations have opened on the line: Marshall station in 2004, Sherwood Park station, near Warrnambool, in 2006, Waurn Ponds station in 2014, and Tarneit and Wyndham Vale in 2015.

From 29 January 2017, V/Line started running a fourth service return service on weekdays with Sunday road coach services being replaced by trains. This meant that three Sunday train services ran in both directions instead of two. Following the timetable change in late August 2017, weekday Warrnambool trains no longer serve Wyndham Vale or Tarneit stations. In December 2018, due to a lack of available rolling stock, H carriages were used on the line past Geelong for the first time. H carriages are no longer used on the Warrnambool service.

From 31 March 2023, the cost of V/Line rail tickets were capped to the same fare as metropolitan services, with daily fares being capped at $9.20 or $4.60 for concession. These changes are expected to bring a large rise in patronage, with fears of overcrowding on V/Line services.

==== Regional Rail Link ====
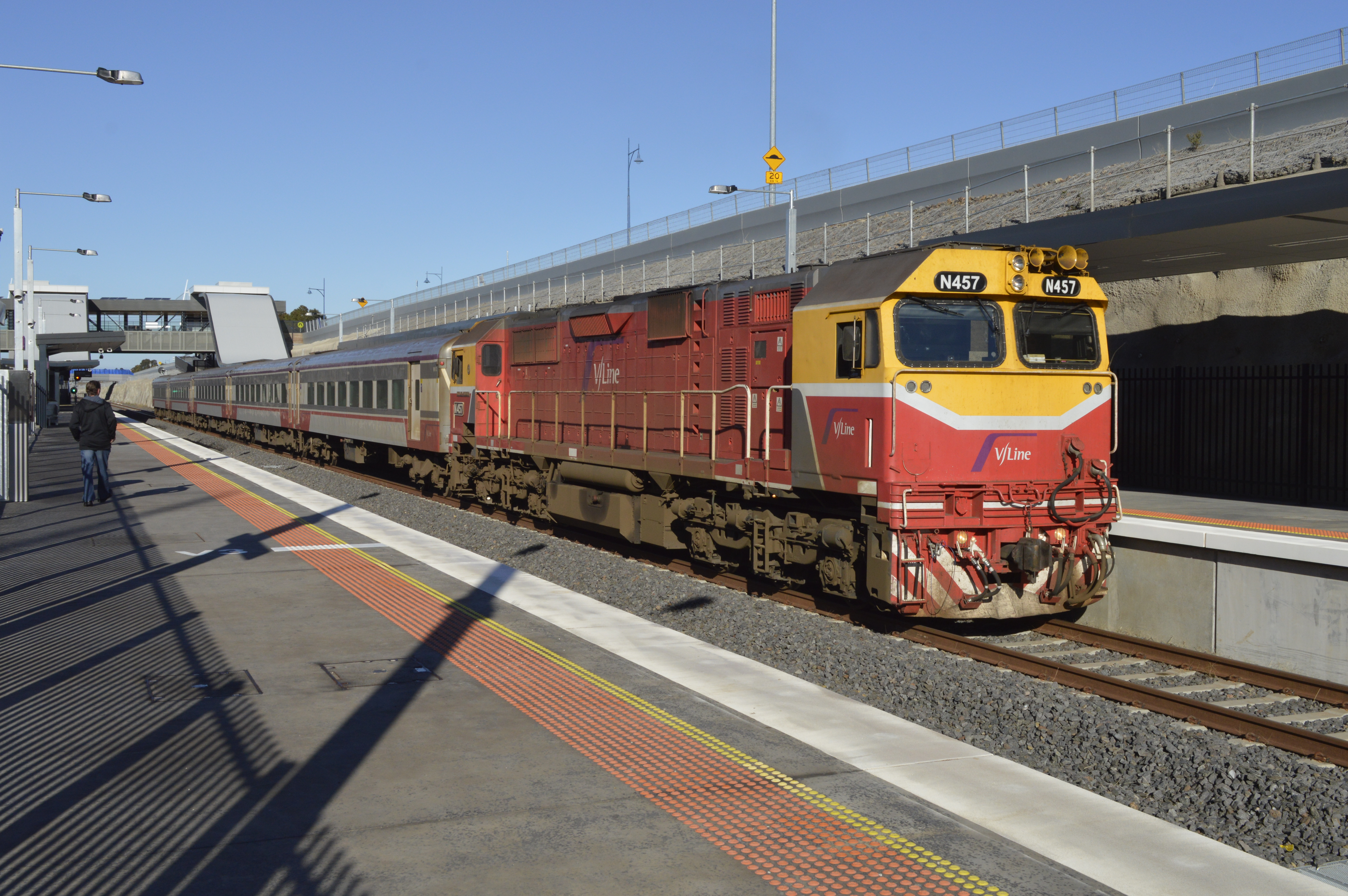
The Regional Rail Link delivered two new stations, including Wyndham Vale (pictured here).

Due to an increase in congestion on the Werribee line where Metro and V/Line services have to share tracks, a proposal was created to construct a separate line for regional trains called the "Tarneit Link". The project was expanded and re-branded as the Regional Rail Link when announced as part of the Brumby Government's Victorian Transport Plan in December 2008. The project was revised to separating all regional trains between Southern Cross and Geelong, Ballarat, and Bendigo, from suburban rail movements, with the proposed route beginning at Southern Cross, travelling through Sunshine and Tarneit to West Werribee.

In December 2013, the first section of the upgrade works were completed and the Warrnambool service could no longer stop at North Melbourne station. On 21 June 2015, the Deer Park–West Werribee railway line opened. Consequently, Warrnambool trains began to run via Wyndham Vale and Tarneit stations, rather than via Werribee and Newport stations on the Werribee Line.

==== Level crossing removals ====
The Level Crossing Removal Project removed 3 level crossings in the area surrounding Deer Park in 2022 and 2023. The crossing at Robinsons Road was removed by constructing a road tunnel underneath the rail line, with the project being completed in September 2022. Another crossing was removed at Mt Derrimut Road via the construction of an elevated rail bridge. This removal also included a newly elevated Deer Park station, car-parking, and public open space. The final crossing that was removed was the one at Fitzgerald Road in neighbouring suburb of Ardeer. This crossing was removed in April 2022 via the construction of a road bridge over the line. Despite a large number of remaining crossings on the line, there are no more scheduled to be removed by the Level Crossing Removal Project.

=== Regional Rail Revival ===
In 2017, the Regional Rail Revival program was announced which included an upgrade to the Warrnambool service. The first stage was aimed at allowing a fifth return service to be introduced and involved:

- Signalling upgrades including the construction of trenches, cabling, and additional infrastructure
- A new 2.2 km crossing loop at Boorcan
- 12 level crossing upgrades between Waurn Ponds and Warrnambool with boom gates, flashing lights, bells, and more advanced train detection technology

Stage 1 of the upgrade was completed in December 2022 with a fifth weekday return service introduced between Melbourne and Warrnambool. In September 2021, a second stage of upgrades aimed at allowing VLocity trains to operate on the line was announced with a completion date of late 2024. This second stage included:

- Upgrades to train detection technology at more than 50 public level crossings
  - Installation of boom gates, bells, and flashing lights at 17 of those crossings
- The upgrade of stabling facilities at Warrnambool Station
- Track upgrades to replace old wooden sleepers

Following the project's completion, there are now no unprotected public level crossings on the line, with all protected by boom gates and flashing lights. Additionally, following this project's completion, VLocity trains began operation, and after March 2025, VLocity trains ran all services, with the final Locomotive-Hauled service being the 7:45am service from Warrnambool to Melbourne on March 30th 2025, operated by N Class locomotive N473 & N-Type carriage set VN12

== Future ==
=== Geelong Fast Rail ===
The Western Rail Plan is a plan that aims to improve the quality of rail services in Melbourne's western suburbs through infrastructure upgrades on a range of metropolitan and regional lines. Geelong Fast Rail was one project identified in the Western Rail Plan as a matter of priority, as it would allow for Geelong and Warrnambool services to travel back via the Werribee line, cutting travel time and allowing electrification of other corridors to occur which are currently being served exclusively by V/Line trains. Phase 1 of Geelong Fast Rail will consist of the following projects aimed at cutting travel times by 15 minutes:

- New track between Werribee and Laverton dedicated to regional services
- Upgrades and widening of bridges over main roads, creeks, and rivers
- Upgraded stations at Werribee and Laverton
- Signalling and train control system upgrades

Construction on the project expected to get underway in 2023, with the Australian and Victorian governments committing $2 billion each to the project which is expected to create 2800 new jobs. Although as of October 2026, construction has not begun and the project has been pushed back until the 2030s.

On 8 October 2026, representatives from Greater Geelong and Wyndham City Councils came together and announced their desires for select services on the Geelong and Warrnambool Lines to be routed once more via Werribee as a trial. Both councils argued that such a service would help Geelong and Werribee locals alike, also calling for a measurement on patronage during a trial. Both leaders also stated that such a trial would be "to begin improving connections while longer term plans are considered."

== Network and operations ==
=== Services ===
Since April 2025, the line has five services per day in each direction. All Warrnambool-bound services operate express between Waurn Ponds and Southern Cross, stopping only at Geelong and Footscray, with the exception of one weekday evening service that additionally stop at North Geelong. Four of the five Melbourne-bound services also operate express in a similar manner in the other direction. The fifth and last Melbourne-bound service of the day (in the evening and night) operates all stations along the line, except on weekends when it runs express through and do not stop at Little River.

Train services on the line are also subjected to maintenance and renewal works, usually on selected Fridays and Saturdays. Shuttle coach services are provided throughout the duration of works for affected commuters.

==== Stopping patterns ====
Legend — Station status

- ◼ Premium Station – Station staffed from first to last train
- ◻ Host Station – Usually staffed during morning peak, however this can vary for different stations on the network.

Legend — Stopping patterns

- ● – All trains stop
- ◐ – Some services do not stop
- ▲ – Only inbound trains stop
- ▼ – Only outbound trains stop
- | – Trains pass and do not stop

Warrnambool Services
Station	Express	All stops
◼ Southern Cross	●	▲
◼ Footscray	●	▲
Deer Park	|	▲
West Tarneit	|	▲
◼ Tarneit	|	▲
◼ Wyndham Vale	|	▲
Little River	|	◐
◻ Lara	|	▲
Corio	|	▲
North Shore	|	▲
◻ North Geelong	▼	▲
◼ Geelong	●	▲
◼ South Geelong	|	▲
◻ Marshall	|	▲
◼ Waurn Ponds	●	▲
◻ Winchelsea	●	▲
Birregurra	●	▲
◻ Colac	●	▲
◻ Camperdown	●	▲
Terang	●	▲
Sherwood Park	●	▲
◼ Warrnambool	●	▲

=== On-board amenities ===
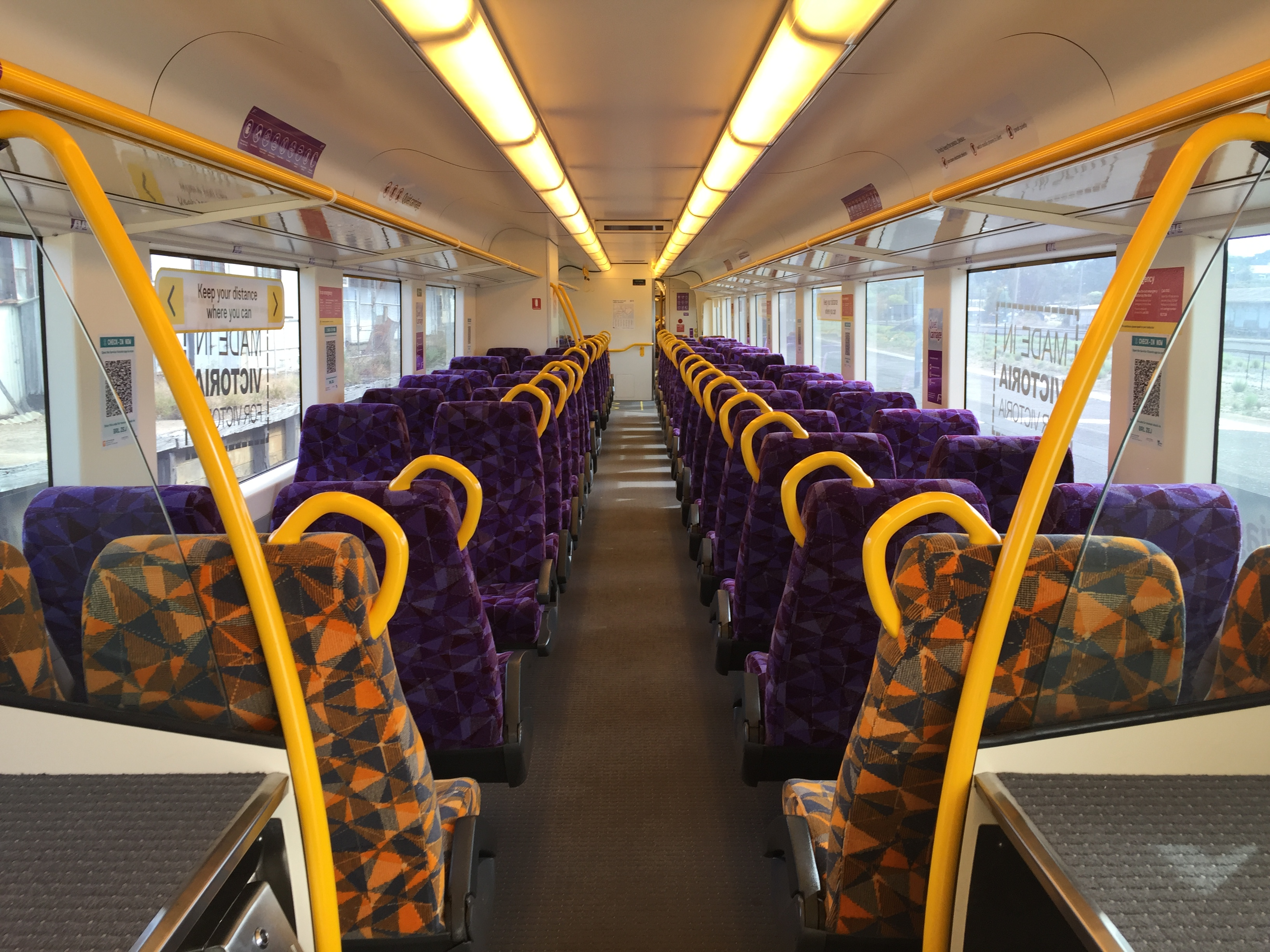
The interior of a VLocity carriage in 2022

The Warrnambool service is classified by V/Line as a long-distance service. Standard on all V/Line services, toilets and luggage racks are available in addition to other amenities. Quiet carriages are available on all services.

=== Operators ===
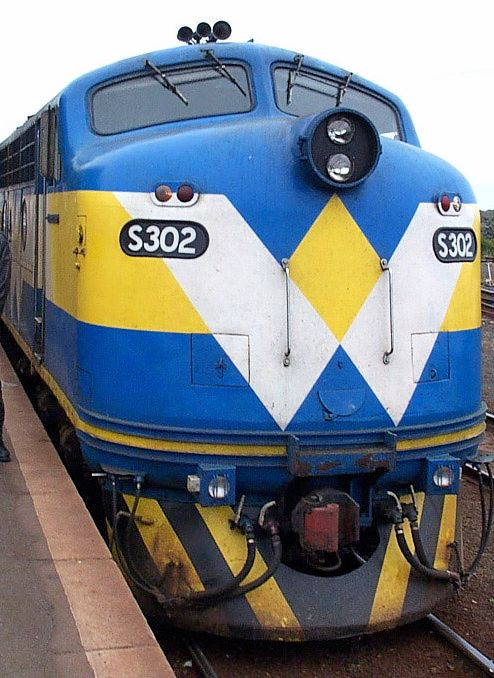
West Coast Railway operated the line for 11 years from 1993 to 2004.

Prior to V/Line taking back operation of the Warrnambool service from West Coast Railway in 2004, there had been 3 previous operators. The majority of operations on the line have been government run, with these operators including the Victorian Railways, the State Transport Authority, and the Public Transport Corporation.

Operator	Assumed operations	Ceased operations	Length of operations
Victorian Railways	1876	1983	107 years
State Transport Authority (V/Line)	1983	1989	6 years
Public Transport Corporation (V/Line)	1989	1993	4 years
West Coast Railway	1993	2004	11 years
V/Line Passenger	2004	2010	6 years
V/Line	2010	incumbent	16 years (ongoing)

=== Route ===
Interactive map of the Warrnambool service in south western Victoria.

The Warrnambool line forms a somewhat curved route from the Melbourne central business district to its terminus. The route is 267.3 kilometres (166.1 mi) long and is doubled tracked up until Waurn Ponds where it narrows to one track. Exiting the city, the Warrnambool line traverses somewhat flat country. Past Waurn Ponds the line begins to curve due to the natural terrain. On track constructed as part of the Regional Rail Link, there are numerous cuttings and embankments designed to eliminate new level crossings. After Wyndham Vale, the line has many level crossings especially past Waurn Ponds station.

The line follows the same alignment as the Geelong line until Waurn Ponds where the Geelong line terminates and the Warrnambool line continues onto Warrnambool. The track up to Waurn Ponds primarily travels through built-up suburbs, industrial areas, and some farm land. After Waurn Ponds, the line travels through open countryside and through small regional towns. The portion of the line before Waurn Ponds is one of Melbourne and Victoria's main growth corridors, where farmland is being replaced with housing and commercial developments, leading to a rise in patronage.

=== Stations ===
The line serves 21 stations across 267.3 kilometres (166.1 mi) of track. The stations are a mix of lowered and ground level designs. The only station that is not at ground level is Wyndham Vale which was constructed in a lowered fashion as part of the Regional Rail Link in 2015.

Station	Accessibility	Opened	Terrain	Train connections	Other connections
Southern Cross	Yes—step free access	1859	Ground level	27 connections: Alamein line; Albury line; Ararat line; Ballarat line; Belgrave line; Bendigo line; Craigieburn line; Cranbourne line; Echuca line; Flemington Racecourse line; Geelong line; Gippsland line; Glen Waverley line; Hurstbridge line; Lilydale line; Maryborough line; Mernda line; NSW TrainLink Southern; Pakenham line; Seymour line; Shepparton line; Sunbury line; Swan Hill line; The Overland; Upfield line; Werribee line; Williamstown line	Trams Buses Coaches SkyBus
Footscray	Yes—step free access	1859	Ground level	10 connections: Ararat line; Ballarat line; Bendigo line; Echuca line; Geelong line; Maryborough line; Sunbury line; Swan Hill line; Werribee line; Williamstown line	Trams Buses
Deer Park	Yes—step free access	1884	Elevated	4 connections: Ararat line; Ballarat line; Geelong line; Maryborough line	Buses
Tarneit	Yes—step free access	2015	Ground level	1 connection: Geelong line	Buses
Wyndham Vale	Yes—step free access	2015	Lowered	1 connection: Geelong line	Buses
Little River	Yes—step free access	1857	Ground level	1 connection: Geelong line	
Lara	Yes—step free access	1856	Ground level	1 connection: Geelong line	Buses
Corio	Yes—step free access	1890	Ground level	1 connection: Geelong line	
North Shore	Yes—step free access	1895	Ground level	2 connections: Geelong line; The Overland	Buses
North Geelong	Yes—step free access	1883	Ground level	1 connection: Geelong line	Buses
Geelong	Yes—step free access	1856	Ground level	1 connection: Geelong line	Buses Coaches
South Geelong	Yes—step free access	1856	Ground level	1 connection: Geelong line	Buses
Marshall	Yes—step free access	2004	Ground level	1 connection: Geelong line	Buses
Waurn Ponds	Yes—step free access	2014	Ground level	1 connection: Geelong line	Buses
Winchelsea	No—steep ramp	1876	Ground level		
Birregurra	No—steep ramp	1877	Ground level		
Colac	Yes—step free access	1877	Ground level		Buses
Camperdown	Yes—step free access	1883	Ground level		Coaches
Terang	Yes—step free access	1877	Ground level		Coaches
Sherwood Park	No—steep ramp	2006	Ground level		Buses
Warrnambool	No—steep ramp	1890	Ground level		Buses Coaches

Station histories
Station	Opened	Closed	Age	Notes
Southern Cross	17 January 1859		167 years	Formerly Batman's Hill; Formerly Spencer Street
Footscray	24 September 1900		126 years	
Sunshine	7 September 1885		141 years	Formerly Braybrook Junction
Deer Park	2 April 1884		142 years	Formerly Kororoit Creek
Tarneit	15 June 2015		11 years	
Wyndham Vale	15 June 2015		11 years	
Wyndham Vale South Sidings	?			Future Black Forest Road station site
Manor	2 February 1911	1 November 1970	59 years	
Mambourin	November 1888	1893	5 years	Formerly Pearce's Bros Siding
Little River	1 January 1957		69 years	Formerly Little River; Formerly Bulban
Lara	1 November 1856		170 years	Formerly Duck Ponds
Elders IXL Siding	12 March 1986	2010	24 years	
Geelong Grammar Siding	24 May 1955		114 years	
Corio	15 September 1890		136 years	Formerly Cowies Creek; Formerly Cowie
Distillers Siding	14 February 1928	c. 21 February 1987	Approx. 59 years	
North Shore	15 April 1895		131 years	Formerly North Shore; Formerly Corio
Harbour Trust Sidings	8 March 1909		117 years	
North Geelong Yard	28 January 1885		141 years	
North Geelong	1 August 1883		143 years	Formerly West Geelong
Geelong Locomotive Depot	20 May 1917		109 years	
Cunningham Pier	?	?		Formerly Railway Pier
Geelong	1 November 1856		170 years	
South Geelong	1 November 1883		143 years	
Geelong Racecourse (2nd)	1 January 1911	19 October 2005	94 years	Formerly Geelong Showgrounds
Breakwater	28 December 1889	6 March 1895	5 years	
Breakwater	25 June 1895	12 August 1898	3 years	
Marshall	14 July 1879	17 February 1964	84 years	Formerly Connewarra
Marshall	26 April 2005		21 years	
Geelong Racecourse (1st)	26 January 1877	c. January 1878	Approx. 11 months	On main line
Geelong Racecourse (1st)	22 January 1878	13 January 1906	27 years	On branch
Grovedale	c. 25 November 1876	1954	Approx. 77 years	Formerly Germantown
Duneed	c. 25 November 1876	26 July 1921	Approx. 44 years	
Waurn Ponds	12 October 2014		12 years	
Waurn Ponds Cement Siding	22 March 1963	31 May 2021	58 years	
Waurn Ponds Stabling Sidings	27 February 2023		3 years	
Pettavel	?	22 August 1952	?	Formerly Pettavel Road
Moriac	1 October 1877	5 October 1982	105 years	Formerly Mount Moriac
Buckley	?	17 October 1955	?	Formerly Buckley's Road
Winchelsea	25 November 1876		149 years	
Armytage	24 August 1911	12 November 1956	45 years	
Birregurra	13 March 1877		149 years	
Warncoort	13 March 1877	22 August 1958	81 years	
Irrewarra	1 October 1877	22 August 1958	80 years	
CRB Siding	1927	?	?	
Shell Oil Company	?	December 1975	?	
Colac	27 July 1877		149 years	Was originally Colac Beach
Larpent	?	?	?	
Pirron Yallock	?	5 October 1982	?	
Stoneyford	?	17 October 1955	?	
Pomborneit	?	14 August 1978	?	
Weerite	?	22 July 1975	?	
Camperdown	2 July 1883		143 years	
Boorcan	23 April 1887	5 October 1982	95 years	
Terang	23 April 1887		139 years	
Garvoc	?	30 January 1966	?	
Panmure	4 February 1890	5 October 1982	92 years	
Cudgee	?	26 September 1960	?	
Allansford	?	5 October 1982	?	
Sherwood Park	19 February 2006		20 years	
Warrnambool Caltex Oil Sidings	27 November 1946	1966	19 years	
Warrnambool Pier	c. 1890	?	?	
Warrnambool	4 February 1890		136 years	
Briquette Siding	?	?	?	
Westvic Siding	?		?	

== Infrastructure ==
=== Rolling stock ===
Upon the completion of Stage 2 of the Warrnambool line upgrade as part of the Regional Rail Revival project from 1 November 2024, the Warrnambool service has used VLocity trains. VLocity trains operate in a three-car configuration (with the ability to be configured up to 6 cars or 9 (on select segments only)) with two doors per side on each carriage and a seating capacity of 222 seats per three car set in a 2+2 configuration. There are two types of interior layouts: commuter (with seating, toilets, and luggage racks) and long distance (with seating, toilets, a kiosk style cafe, and luggage racks). Only commuter VLocities are available for use on broad gauge, with all long-distance VLocities currently on Standard Gauge. Unlike existing long distance locomotive hauled trains, first class isn't available on board the VLocity trains. Commuter and Long Distance VLocity's are currently in operation on all other long-distance lines to some extent, with more progressively being delivered. The trains have been continuously built at Alstom's Dandenong factory in Melbourne's south-east since 2004. From 1 December 2024, Vlocity services were introduced on all except overnight stabling services to Warrnambool, with only two services in each direction on weekdays and one on weekends still being locomotive hauled. On 30 March 2025, the last locomotive-hauled train ran on the Warrnambool line, meaning all services to Warrnambool will be operated by Vlocity trains.

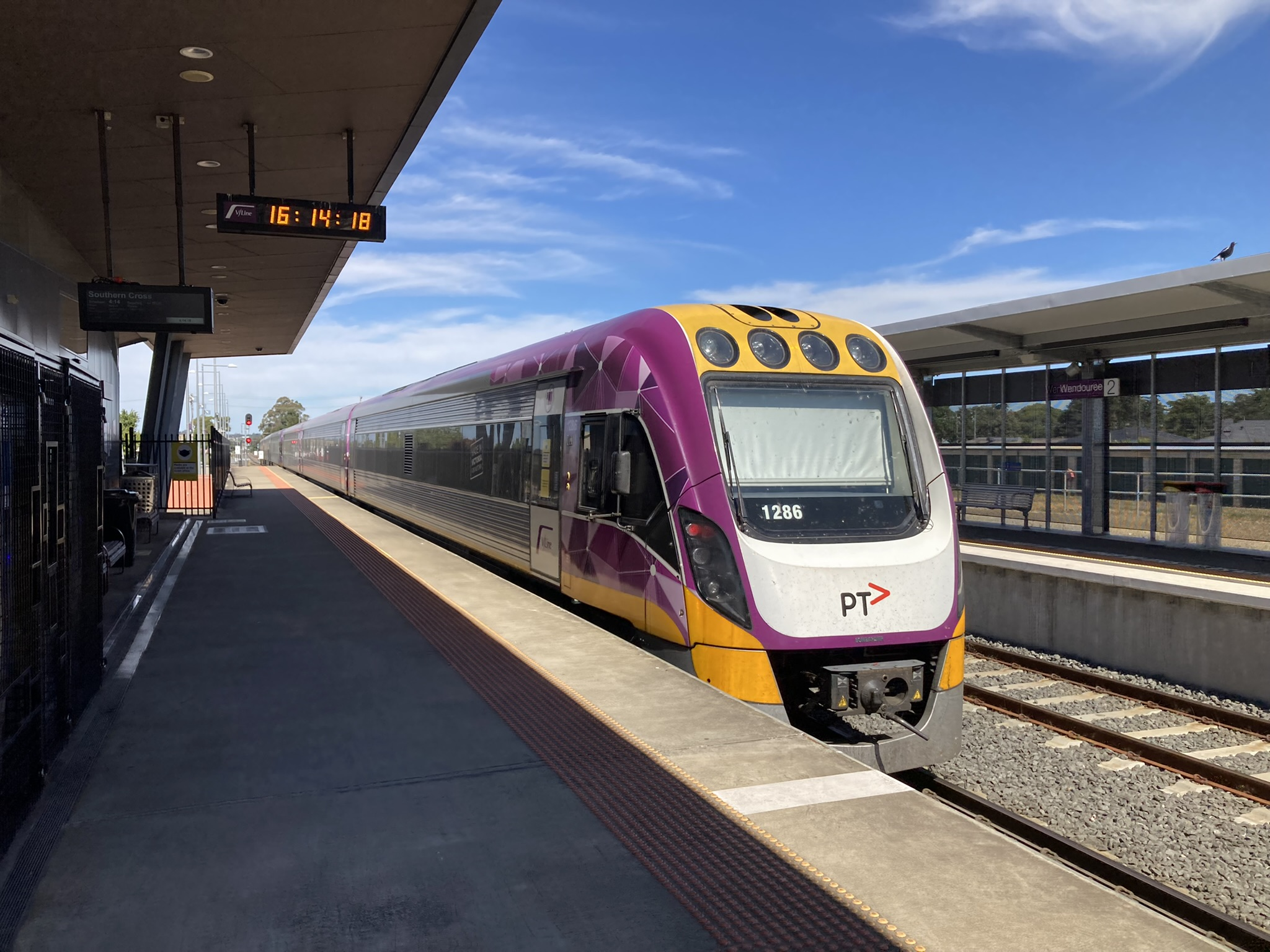
V/Line VLocity railcars run on the Warrnambool line

Alongside the passenger trains, Warrnambool line tracks and equipment are maintained by a fleet of engineering trains. The two types of engineering trains are: the shunting train, designed for moving trains along non-electrified corridors and for transporting other maintenance locomotives; and the infrastructure evaluation carriage designed for general infrastructure evaluation including track and electrical infrastructure (if travelling along electrified corridors). Most of these trains are repurposed locomotives previously used by V/Line, Metro Trains, and the Southern Shorthaul Railroad.

=== Accessibility ===
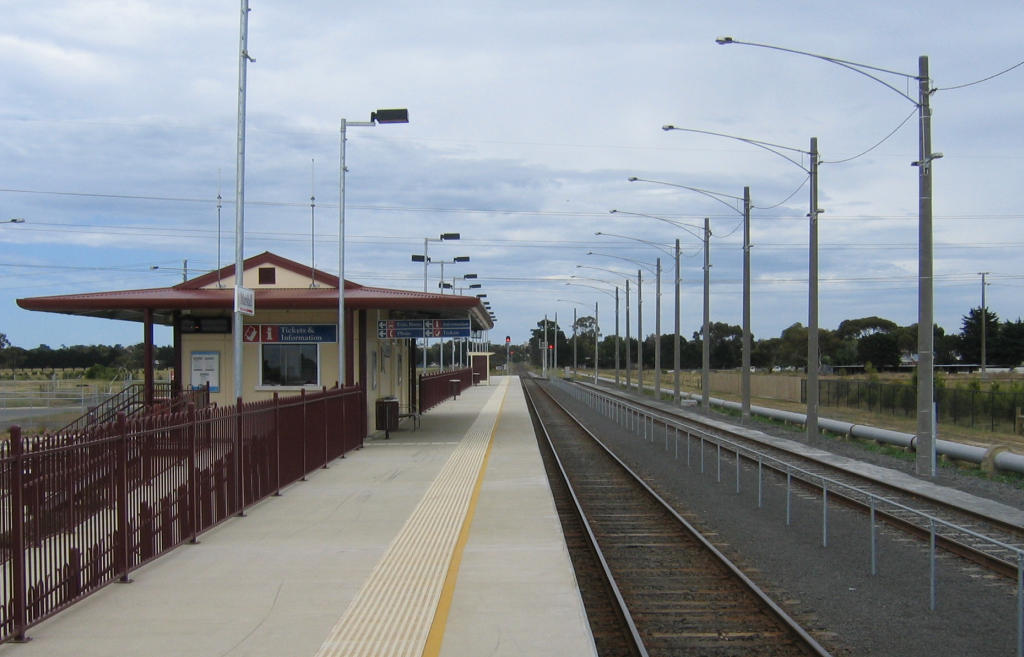
Marshall station has accessible features including tactile boarding indicators and ramps that have a gradient less than 1 in 14.

In compliance with the Disability Discrimination Act of 1992, all stations that are new-built or rebuilt are fully accessible and comply with these guidelines. The majority of stations on the corridor are fully accessible, however, there are some stations that haven't been upgraded to meet these guidelines. These stations do feature ramps, however, they have a gradient greater than 1 in 14. Stations that are fully accessible feature ramps that have a gradient less than 1 in 14, have at-grade paths, or feature lifts. These stations typically also feature tactile boarding indicators, independent boarding ramps, wheelchair accessible myki barriers, hearing loops, and widened paths.

Projects improving station accessibility have included the Regional Rail Revival (RRL) program, which involves station rebuilds and upgrades. These works have made significant strides in improving network accessibility, with more than 80% of the stations on the line classed as fully accessible. This number is expected to grow within the coming years as works progress on the RRL.

=== Signalling ===
The Warrnambool line uses a combination of different signalling types due to the length of the line. The line is generally Automatic and Track Control, with Automatic Block Signalling between North Geelong and Geelong, and between Sherwood Park and Warrnambool.

== See also ==
- West Coast Railway (Victoria)
- The Flyer
