= Sherwood Park railway station =

Railway station in Victoria, Australia

Sherwood Park
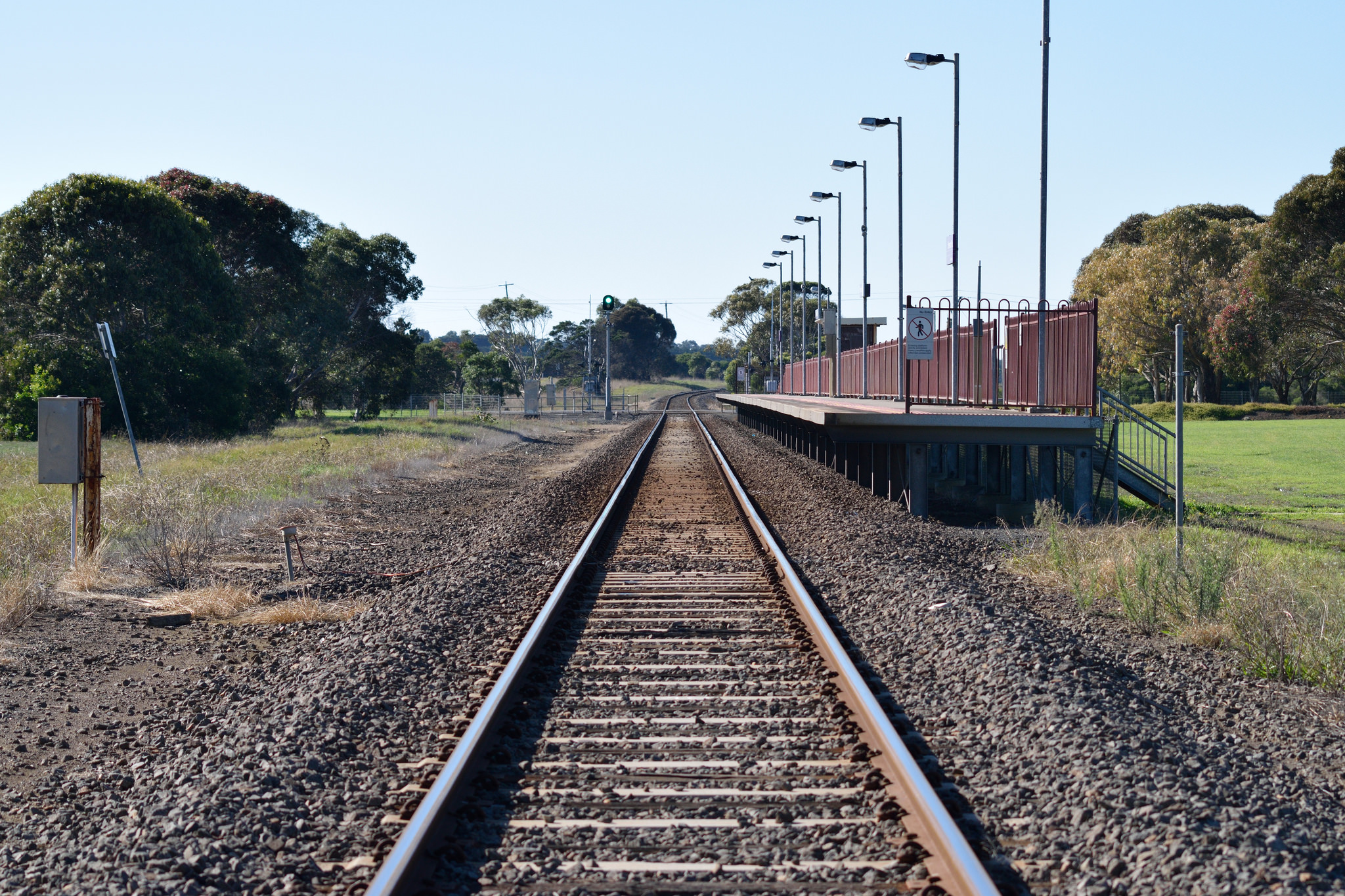
- Eastbound view of the station platform, April 2016

General information
- Location: Aitken Drive, Warrnambool, Victoria 3280; City of Warrnambool; Australia
- Coordinates: 38°23′13″S 142°32′22″E
- System: PTV regional rail station
- Owner: VicTrack
- Operator: V/Line
- Line: Warrnambool (Warrnambool)
- Distance: 261.39 kilometres from Southern Cross
- Platforms: 1
- Tracks: 1
- Connections: Bus

Construction
- Structure type: Ground
- Accessible: Yes

Other information
- Status: Operational, unstaffed
- Fare zone: Myki zone 22
- Website: Public Transport Victoria

History
- Opened: 19 February 2006; 20 years ago

Services
Five services in each direction on weekdays
Three services in each direction on weekends
Preceding station	V/Line	Following station
Terang towards Southern Cross	Warrnambool line	Warrnambool Terminus
Location
- Location within Victoria

Sherwood Park railway station is a regional railway station on the Warrnambool line, part of the Victorian railway network, opening on the 19th of February 2006.

This railway station is also the least patronised station on the Warrnambool line, and one of the least-used in Victoria. Patronage data showed that only 1,814 passengers used the station in 2016–2017, an average of five a day.

== History ==
Before Sherwood Park existed, the Port Fairy line opened from Terang to Warrnambool on the 4th of February, 1890.

The intention to build Sherwood Park was first announced during the 2002 Victorian state election. Eventually in 2006, Sherwood Park opened on the 19 February to serve the adjacent Warrnambool campus of Deakin University.

In November 2023, the adjacent level crossings at Tooram Road and Jubilee Park Road were upgraded to boom barriers, as part of the Warrnambool Line Upgrade.

== Platforms and services ==
Sherwood Park has one platform and is served by V/Line Warrnambool line trains to Southern Cross and nearby Warrnambool. The station has limited usage due a lack of residential development within close proximity, and limited pedestrian access.

Sherwood Park platform arrangement
Platform	Line	Destination
1	Warrnambool line	Southern Cross, Warrnambool

== Gallery ==
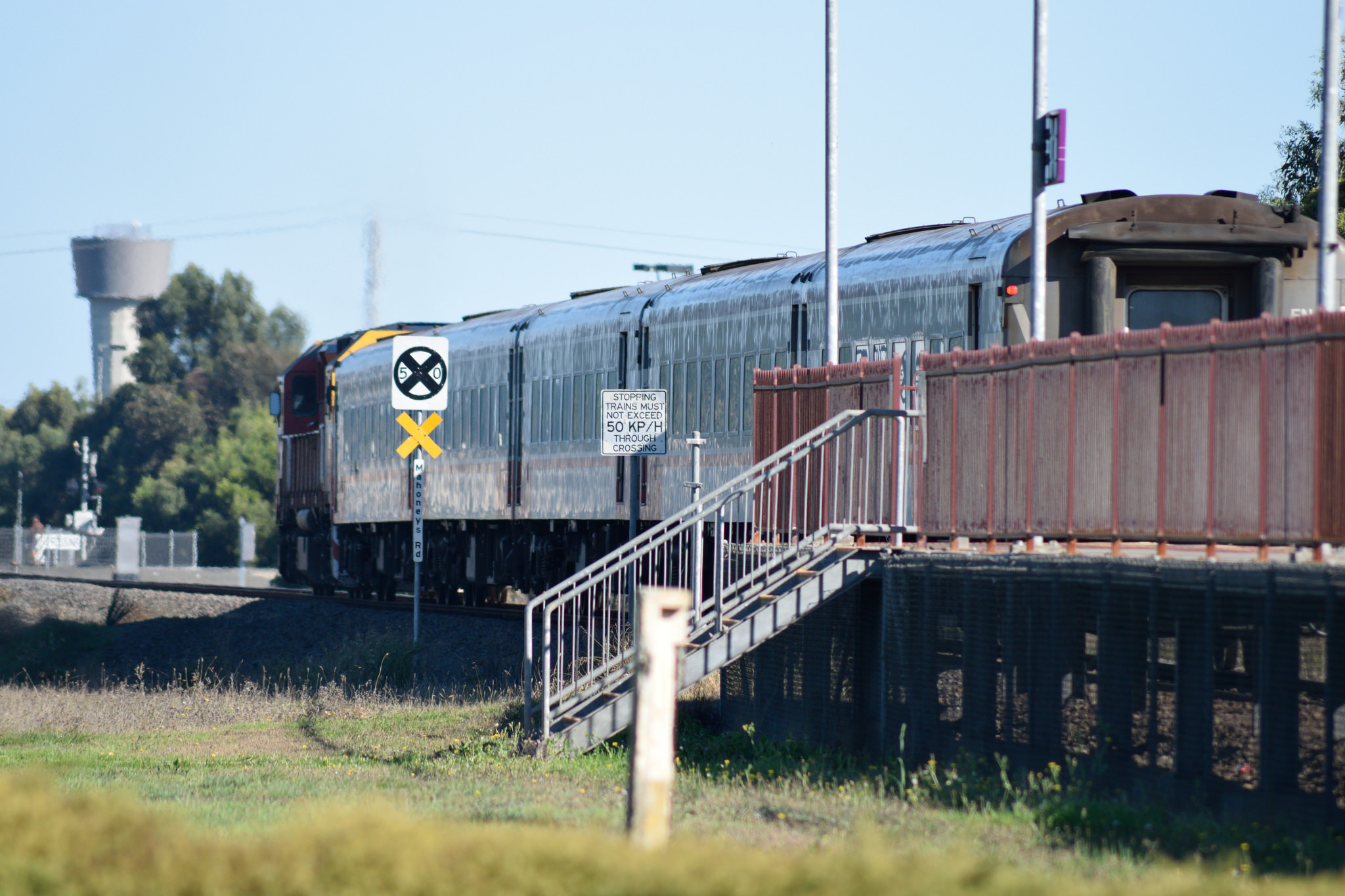
Warrnambool-bound train departs Sherwood Park station, April 2016
