= Terang railway station =

Railway station in Victoria, Australia

Terang
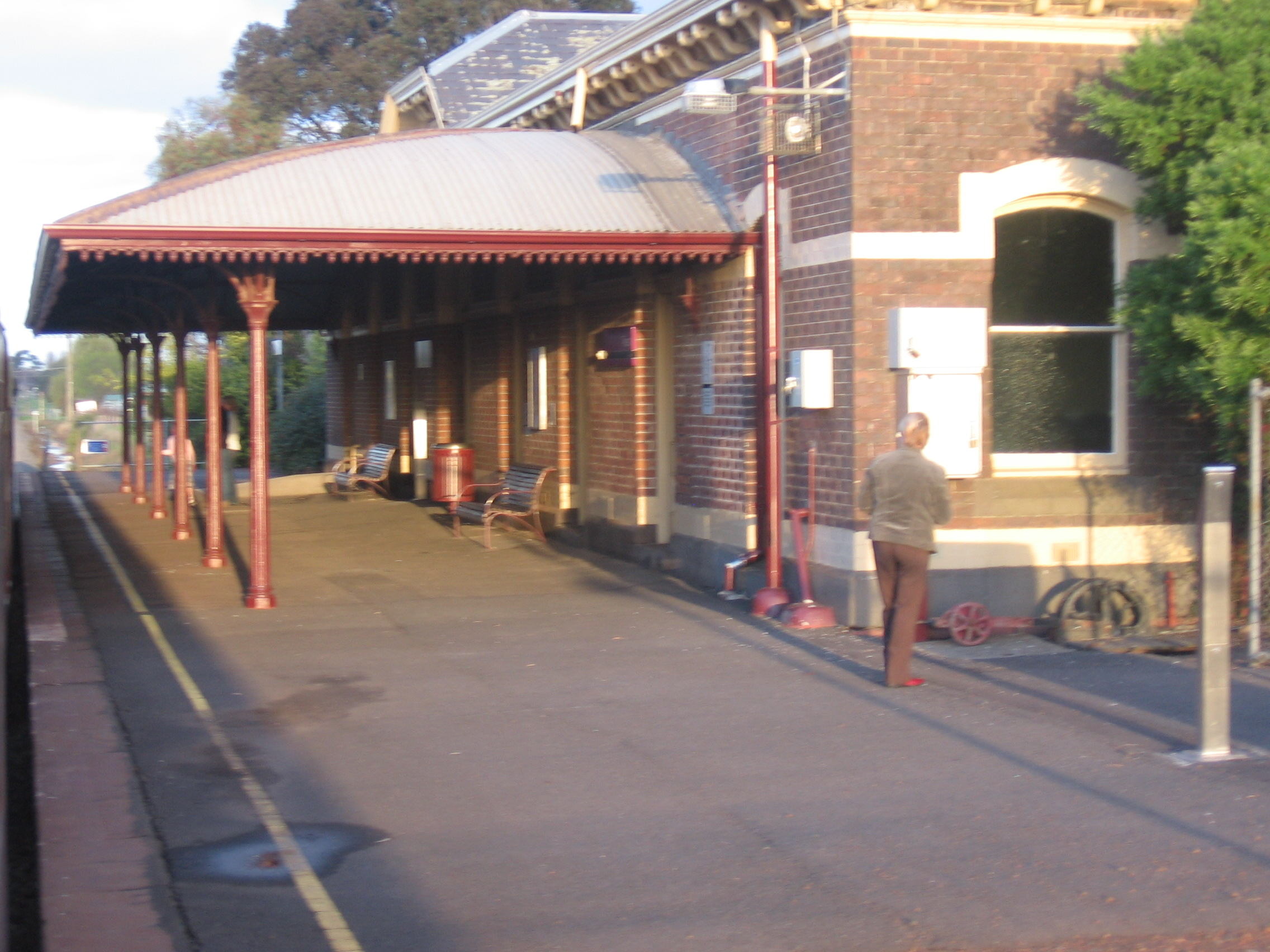
- Eastbound view of the station building, September 2008

General information
- Location: Lyons Street, Terang, Victoria 3264; Shire of Corangamite; Australia
- Coordinates: 38°14′11″S 142°54′41″E
- System: PTV regional rail station
- Owner: VicTrack
- Operator: V/Line
- Line: Warrnambool (Warrnambool)
- Distance: 220.79 kilometres from Southern Cross
- Platforms: 1
- Tracks: 2

Construction
- Structure type: Ground
- Parking: Yes
- Accessible: Yes

Other information
- Status: Operational, unstaffed
- Station code: TER
- Fare zone: Myki zone 18
- Website: Public Transport Victoria

History
- Opened: 23 April 1887; 139 years ago

Services
Five services in each direction on weekdays
Three services in each direction on weekends
Preceding station	V/Line	Following station
Camperdown towards Southern Cross	Warrnambool line	Sherwood Park towards Warrnambool
Location
- Location within Victoria

Terang railway station is a regional railway station on the Warrnambool line, part of the Victorian railway network. It serves the town of Terang, in Victoria, Australia. Terang station is a ground level unstaffed station, featuring one side platform. It opened on 23 April 1887.

== History ==
Terang opened as the terminus of the line from Camperdown. On 4 February 1890, the line was extended to Warrnambool. During the first year of operation, the station sold 11,510 tickets to Camperdown, for a total revenue of £11,157. At the peak of operations, the station had a four road yard. Today, it has a single dead end siding.

The station was once the junction for the Mortlake line. It opened in 1890, and closed on 1 August 1978.

The building itself consists of a single level. Notable features include round arched windows, tall octagonal chimney stacks, cream brick dressings and a gambrel roof to the porch. The station represents an intact example of a station building design stemming from the Victorian Government Railway Construction Act 1884. As a result, the station is heritage listed and holds a historical significance to south-west Victoria.

A number of track alterations took place at the station in 1982, including the removal of No. 4 road, the dock road and a dead end extension of No. 2 road.

In 2007, points at the down end of the station were abolished, and was replaced with a straight section of track. This effectively left Terang straight-railed.

As part of the Regional Rail Revival project, a passing lane is to be constructed at Boorcan, located between Terang and Camperdown stations, to allow an increase of passenger services on the line. The project is due to be completed in mid-2022.

== Platforms and services ==
Terang has one platform. It is serviced by V/Line Warrnambool line services.

Terang platform arrangement
Platform	Line	Destination
1	Warrnambool line	Southern Cross, Warrnambool
