= Camperdown railway station =

Railway station in Victoria, Australia

Camperdown
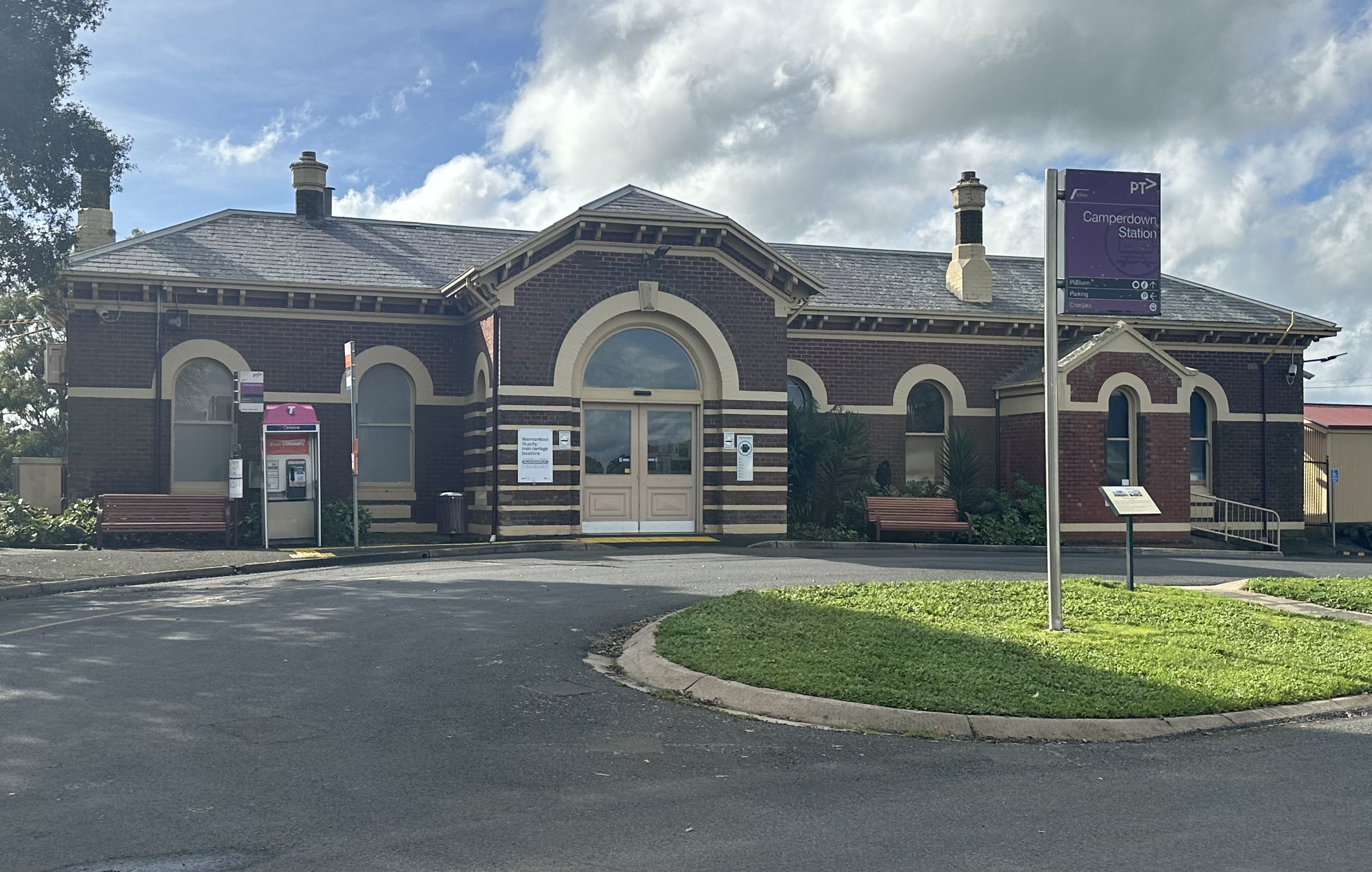
- Entrance to Camperdown station in July 2026

General information
- Location: Pike Street, Camperdown, Victoria 3260; Shire of Corangamite; Australia
- Coordinates: 38°13′43″S 143°09′03″E
- System: PTV regional rail station
- Owner: VicTrack
- Operator: V/Line
- Line: Warrnambool (Warrnambool)
- Distance: 198.50 kilometres from Southern Cross
- Platforms: 1
- Tracks: 2

Construction
- Structure type: Ground
- Parking: Yes
- Accessible: Yes

Other information
- Status: Operational, staffed part-time
- Station code: CPD
- Fare zone: Myki zone 16
- Website: Public Transport Victoria

History
- Opened: 2 July 1883; 143 years ago
- Original company: West Coast Railway (19 September 1993 - 31 August 2004)

Services
Five services in each direction on weekdays
Three services in each direction on weekends
Preceding station	V/Line	Following station
Colac towards Southern Cross	Warrnambool line	Terang towards Warrnambool
Location
- Location within Victoria

Camperdown is a railway station located on the Warrnambool line in Victoria, Australia. It opened on 2 July 1883 and serves the town of Camperdown.

== History ==
When Camperdown station opened, it was the terminus of the line from Colac. On 23 April 1887, the line was extended to Terang.

The station was once the junction for the Timboon line, which branched off at the western or down end of the station. All signalling and safeworking equipment at the junction had been abolished by September 1987.

By May 1969, the former turntable at the station was removed, and in March 1976, the refreshment room closed. Passenger facilities were refurbished in late 1984 and early 1985. It was also in 1985 that the former freight centre closed, and the freight office had been demolished by August of that year.

In September 1988, the former No. 2 and No. 4 roads were abolished, as were the sidings provided for Shell and Mobil, and the locomotive and works sidings. A number of signal posts were also removed, along with a ground lever frame. In 1991, No. 3 road was abolished.

The Warrnambool freight train crosses the weekday morning up passenger train to Southern Cross station in Melbourne, at the remaining crossing loop on the line. However, with services scheduled to increase to five per weekday from 2022, as part of the Regional Rail Revival project, and the construction of a crossing loop at Boorcan, between Camperdown and Terang stations, its possible that the crossing loop at Camperdown (No. 2 road) will be decommissioned.

== Platforms and services ==
Camperdown has one platform. It is served by V/Line Warrnambool line trains. The station building comprises a waiting room, a ticket and customer service desk, and toilets.

Camperdown platform arrangement
Platform	Line	Destination	Service Type	Notes
1	Warrnambool line	Southern Cross, Warrnambool		
