= Marshall railway station =

Railway station in Geelong, Victoria, Australia

Marshall
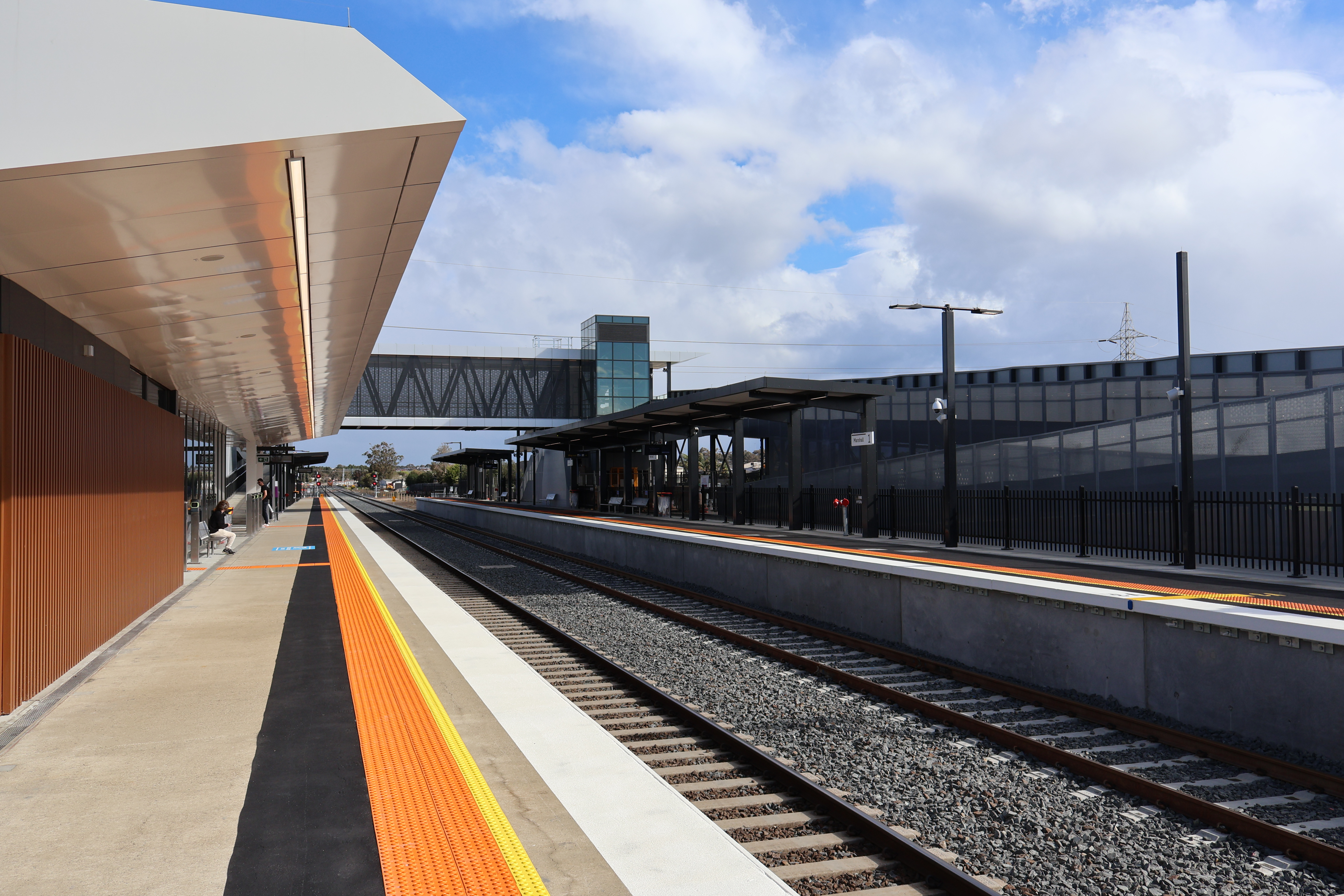
- Southbound view from platform 2 with the station upgrade complete. September 2024

General information
- Location: Marshalltown Road, Marshall, Victoria 3216; City of Greater Geelong; Australia
- Coordinates: 38°11′56″S 144°21′18″E
- System: PTV regional rail station
- Owner: VicTrack
- Operator: V/Line
- Lines: Geelong Warrnambool (Warrnambool)
- Distance: 79.60 kilometres from Southern Cross
- Platforms: 2 side
- Tracks: 2 (main-line plus run-around loop)
- Connections: Bus

Construction
- Structure type: Ground
- Parking: Yes
- Cycle facilities: Yes
- Accessible: Yes

Other information
- Status: Operational, staffed part-time
- Station code: MSL
- Fare zone: Myki zone 4
- Website: Public Transport Victoria

History
- Opened: 14 July 1879; 147 years ago
- Closed: 14 October 1957
- Rebuilt: 26 April 2005; 26 August 2024 (Regional Rail Revival)
- Former names: Connewarre (1879-1907); Grovedale (during planning stage in 2002/2003)

Passengers
- 2013-2014: 233,410
- 2014-2015: 231,806 ▼0.85%
- 2015-2016: 202,362 ▼12.55%
- 2016-2017: 190,704 ▼5.94%

Services
Preceding station	V/Line	Following station
South Geelong towards Southern Cross	Geelong line	Waurn Ponds Terminus
South Geelong towards Southern Cross	Warrnambool line One service per night	Waurn Ponds One-way operation
Location
- Location within Victoria

Marshall railway station is a regional railway station on the Warrnambool line, part of the Victorian railway network. It serves the southern suburb of Marshall, in Geelong, Victoria, Australia. Marshall station is a ground level premium station, featuring two side platforms, connected by an accessible footbridge and concourse. It opened on 14 July 1879 and was rebuilt in 2024 as part of the Regional Rail Revival project. The station was initially closed on 14 October 1957, then reopened on 26 April 2005.

The former Geelong Racecourse station was located between Marshall and South Geelong.

== History ==
=== Original Marshall station (1879-1957) ===
A previous station on the site, named Connewarre, opened on 14 July 1879, and was renamed Marshall on 1 April 1907. That station was closed to passengers on 14 October 1957, and the platform had been removed by 22 July 1958. The station was closed to all traffic on 17 February 1964.

=== Current Marshall station (2005-Present) ===
During the 2002 Victorian state election, the State Government promised that a new station would be provided in the vicinity to serve the rapidly expanding southernmost suburbs of Geelong, with the exact site to be determined. During the planning stages, the station was named Grovedale. In December 2003, it was announced that the new station would be built adjacent to the Marshalltown Road level crossing, on the site of the former Marshall station. Following a naming competition, it was revealed in September 2004 that the new station would be called Marshall.

The station was reopened on 26 April 2005, and was initially served by Warrnambool line trains only. From September 2005, Geelong line services were extended from South Geelong, and Marshall became the terminus for most Geelong-line trains. Following its opening in October 2014, Waurn Ponds station became the terminus for the majority of Geelong line services.

As part of Regional Rail Revival, the railway line between Waurn Ponds and South Geelong was duplicated, with a new second platform added to the station. The platform and station building closed on 15 June 2024 and were demolished. On 26 August 2024, the rebuilt station opened to passengers. The rebuilt station included a new station building on Platform 1 with an upgraded waiting room, a new second platform provided, a new pedestrian overpass, a new forecourt, upgraded car parking spaces, upgraded bus interchange, upgraded lighting, upgraded platform shelters and CCTV. The duplication of the railway line was also completed on the same day.

== Platforms and services ==
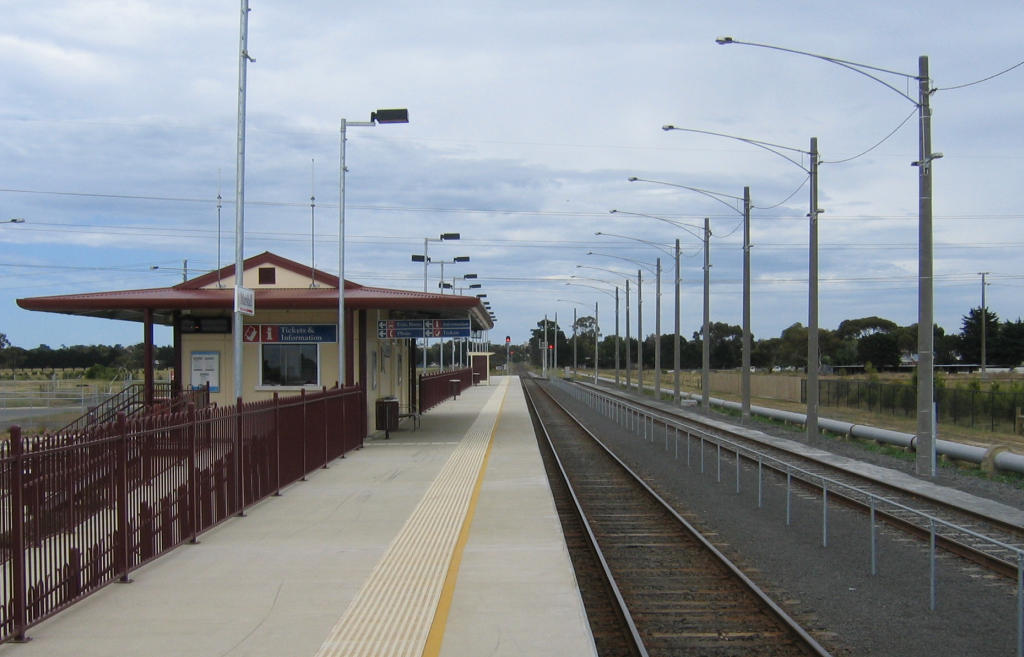
Southbound view from the station platform, showing the former station building to the left, December 2005

Marshall has two side platforms. It is served by V/Line Geelong line trains and one Warrnambool line service towards Southern Cross each night.

Marshall platform arrangement
Platform	Line	Destination	Notes
1	Geelong line Warrnambool line	Southern Cross	One Warrnambool line service from Warrnambool every night
2	Geelong line	Waurn Ponds	

== Transport links ==
McHarry's Buslines operates four routes via Marshall station, under contract to Public Transport Victoria:

- 40 : Geelong station – Deakin University Waurn Ponds Campus
- 50 : Geelong station – Jan Juc
- 52 : Geelong station – Jan Juc
- 55 : Geelong station – Ocean Grove
