= Waurn Ponds railway station =

Railway station in Geelong, Victoria, Australia

Waurn Ponds
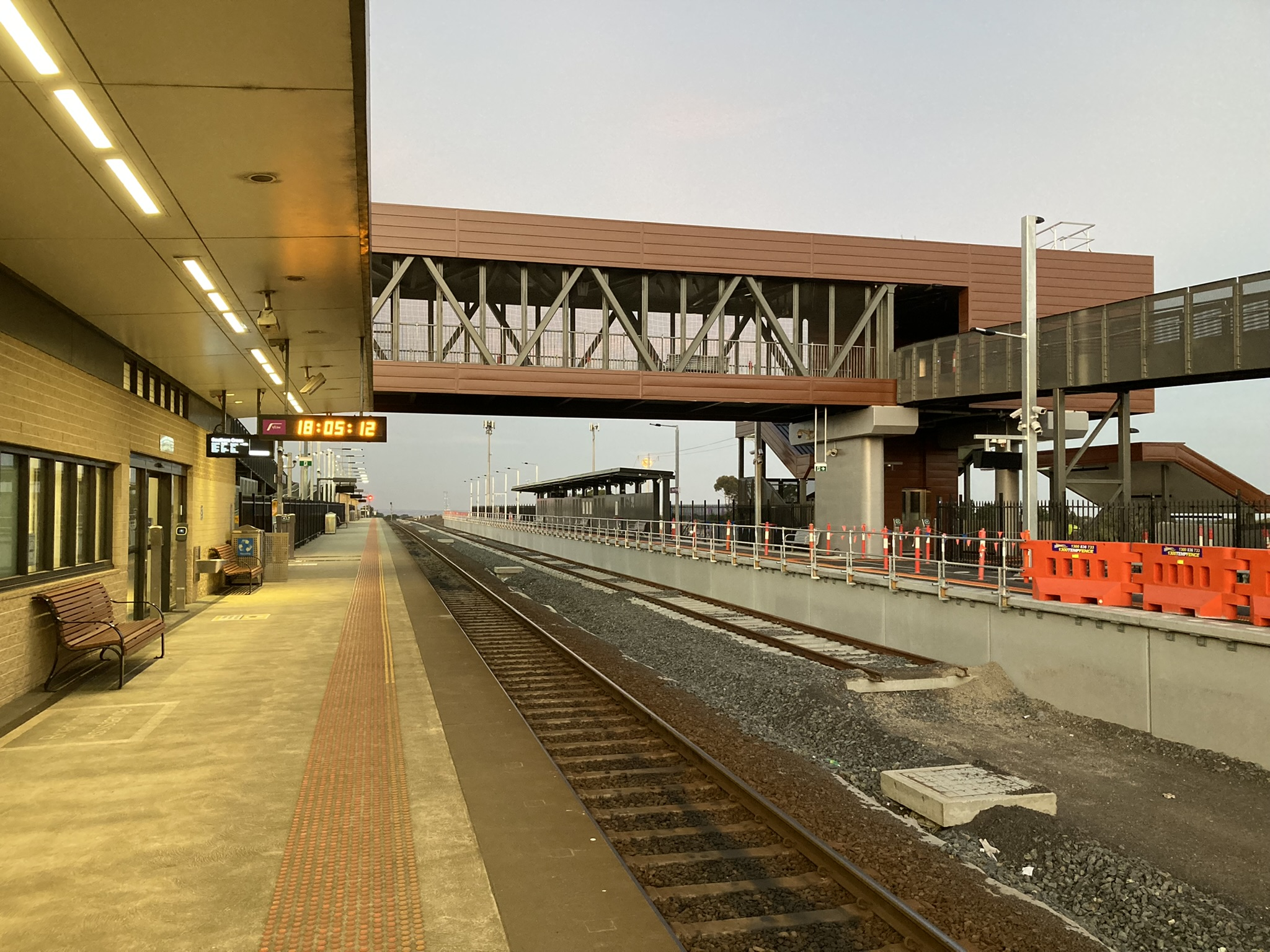
- Eastbound view from Platform 1, with Platform 2 under construction, April 2022

General information
- Location: Sugargum Drive, Waurn Ponds, Victoria 3216; City of Greater Geelong; Australia
- Coordinates: 38°12′39.88″S 144°20′19.23″E
- System: PTV regional rail station
- Owner: VicTrack
- Operator: V/Line
- Lines: Geelong Warrnambool (Warrnambool)
- Distance: 84.90 kilometres from Southern Cross
- Platforms: 2 side
- Tracks: 2
- Connections: Bus

Construction
- Structure type: Ground
- Parking: Yes
- Cycle facilities: Yes
- Accessible: Yes

Other information
- Status: Operational, staffed
- Station code: WPD
- Fare zone: Myki zone 4
- Website: Public Transport Victoria

History
- Opened: 12 October 2014; 11 years ago
- Rebuilt: 31 May 2022 (Regional Rail Revival)
- Former names: Grovedale (provisionally)

Passengers
- 2014-2015: 84,323
- 2015-2016: 179,836 ▲113.09%
- 2016-2017: 225,053 ▲25.69%

Services
To Melbourne: Approximately every 20 minutes.
To Warrnambool: 5 services daily per direction
Preceding station	V/Line	Following station
Marshall towards Southern Cross	Geelong line	Terminus
Geelong towards Southern Cross	Warrnambool line	Winchelsea towards Warrnambool
Marshall towards Southern Cross	Warrnambool line One service per night	Winchelsea One-way operation
Location
- Location within Victoria

Waurn Ponds railway station is a regional railway station on the Warrnambool line, part of the Victorian railway network. It serves the southern Geelong suburb of Waurn Ponds, in Victoria, Australia. Waurn Ponds station is a ground level premium station, featuring two side platforms. It opened on 12 October 2014, with the current station provided in 2022.

== History ==
Waurn Ponds is the terminus for many V/Line's Geelong line services. Located between Oakwood Crescent and Rossack Drive, the station was initially to be named Grovedale, but was renamed Waurn Ponds before opening.

In April 2013, the Victorian Government announced that a new station would be built at Waurn Ponds, to serve the nearby suburbs of Grovedale and Armstrong Creek. The station was budgeted at $25.9 million, with $9.4 million for planning and land acquisition, and $16.5 million for a single platform with passenger amenities, booking office and toilets, bus bays, bicycle storage, and parking for 200 cars.

Contracts for the construction of the station were awarded in February 2014. In July 2014, the name of the station was changed to Waurn Ponds, and the size of the planned car park was increased to 292 spaces, along with overflow parking for a further 100 to 150 vehicles. The new station opened on 12 October 2014.

In 2020, the State Government announced an upgrade to the station, as part of the Regional Rail Revival project. The project included the construction of a new platform to the south of the existing platform, a new pedestrian overpass, an upgraded car park and upgraded lighting and CCTV. As part of those works, the railway line between Waurn Ponds and South Geelong is being duplicated, as well as the construction of a new maintenance and stabling facility. Major works at the station were completed in January 2022, with all station upgrades, including the second platform, in use by 31 May of that year.

The Waurn Ponds name was also used by V/Line's Network Access Division, to refer to the former Victorian Portland Cement Company sidings at the Blue Circle Southern Cement plant, two kilometres west of the passenger station. On 31 May 2021, the sidings were officially abolished.

== Platforms and services ==
Waurn Ponds has two side platforms and is served by V/Line Geelong and Warrnambool line trains.

Waurn Ponds platform arrangement
Platform	Line	Destination
1	Geelong line Warrnambool line	Southern Cross, Warrnambool
2	Geelong line Warrnambool line	Southern Cross, Warrnambool

== Transport links ==
McHarry's Buslines operates three routes via Waurn Ponds station, under contract to Public Transport Victoria:

- 41 : Geelong station – Deakin University Waurn Ponds Campus
- 42 : Geelong station – Deakin University Waurn Ponds Campus
- 45 : Armstrong Creek – Waurn Ponds Shopping Centre

== Gallery ==
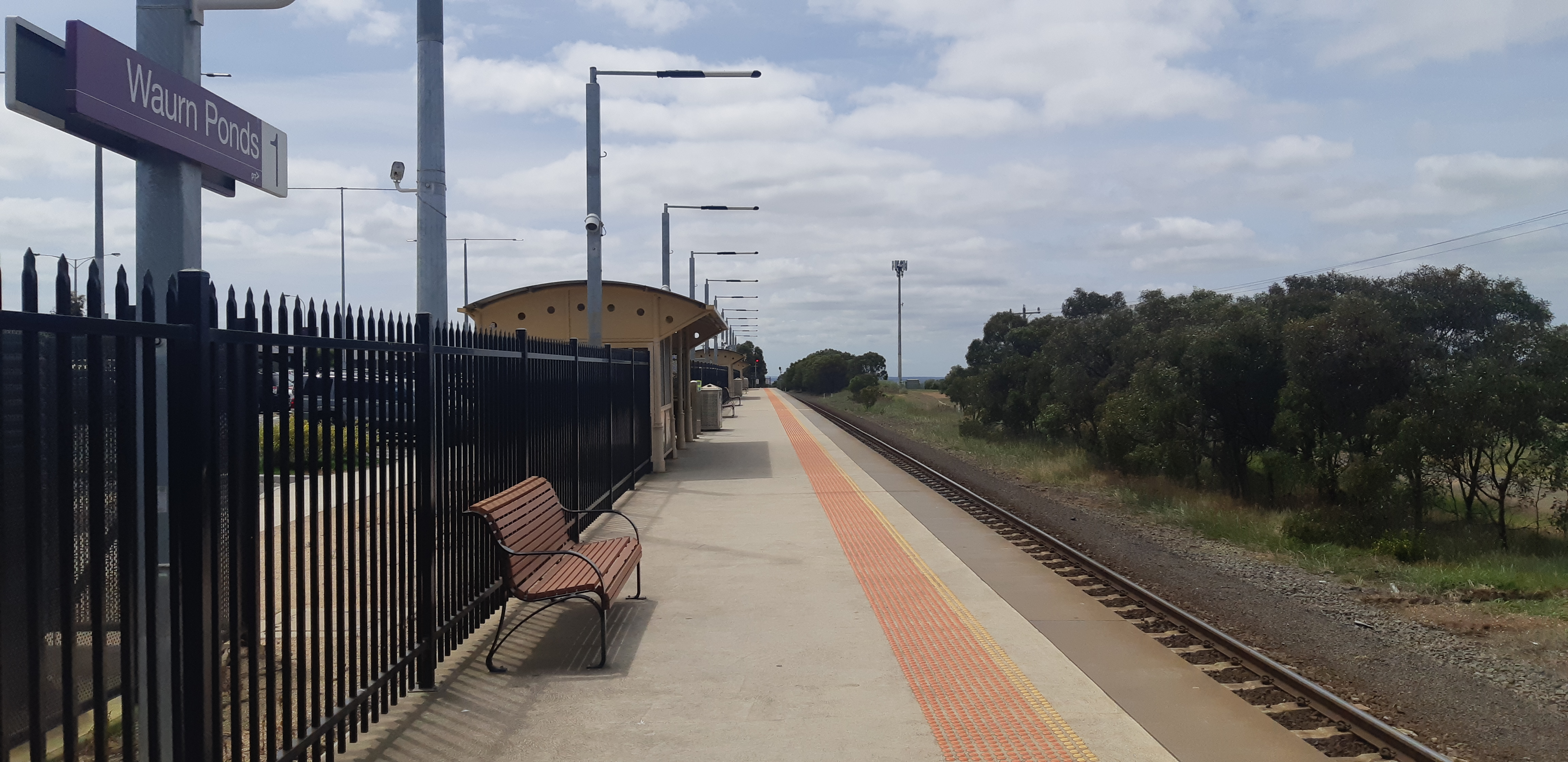
Eastbound view from the station platform, November 2019
