= Warrnambool railway station =

Railway station in Victoria, Australia

Warrnambool
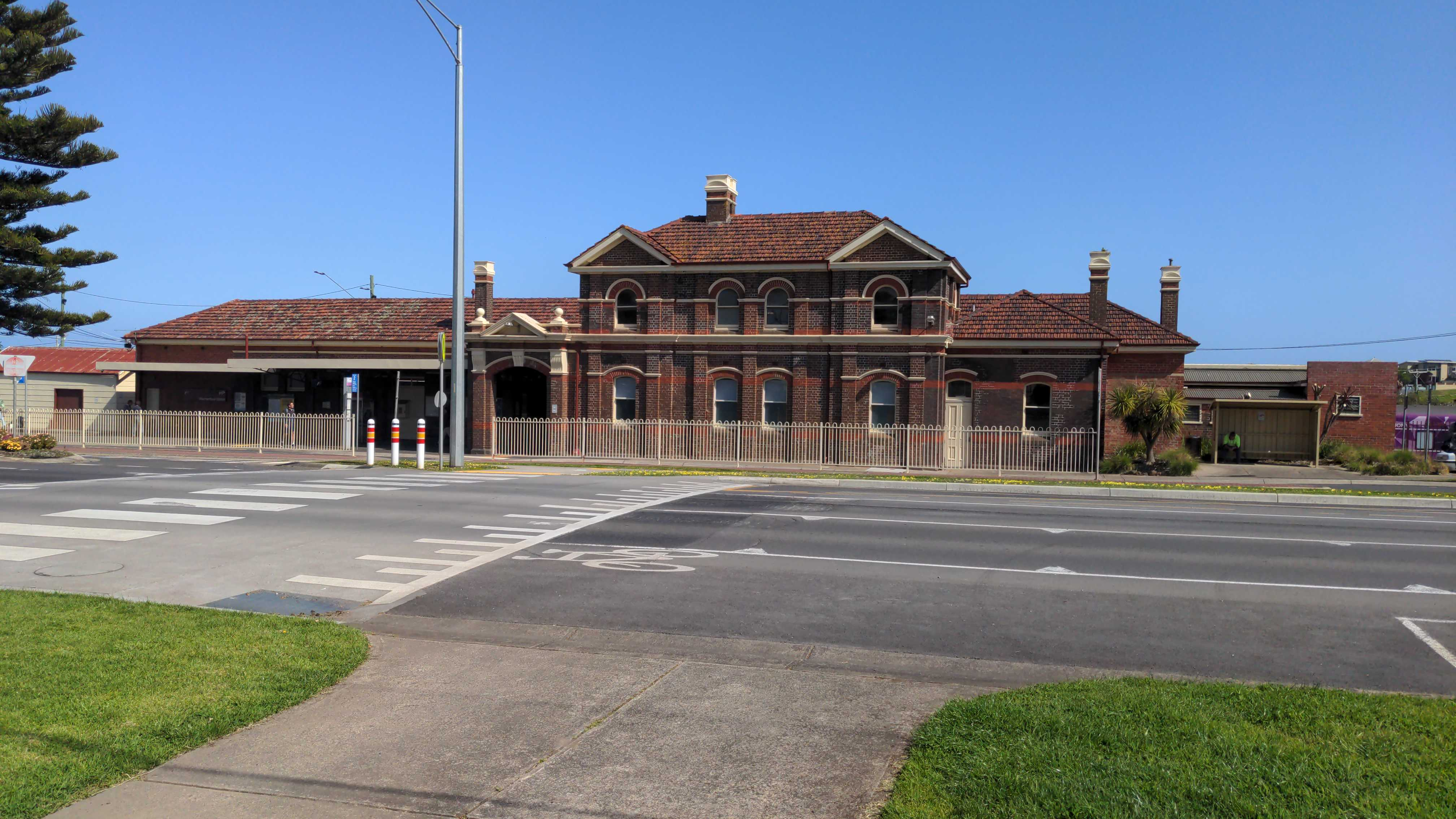
- Heritage station building and entrance, September 2023

General information
- Location: Merri Street, Warrnambool, Victoria 3280; City of Warrnambool; Australia
- Coordinates: 38°23′06″S 142°28′32″E
- System: PTV regional rail station
- Owner: VicTrack
- Operator: V/Line
- Line: Warrnambool (Warrnambool)
- Distance: 267.30 kilometres from Southern Cross
- Platforms: 1
- Tracks: 4
- Connections: Bus; Coach

Construction
- Structure type: Ground
- Parking: Yes
- Accessible: No

Other information
- Status: Operational, staffed
- Station code: WNB
- Fare zone: Myki zone 22
- Website: Public Transport Victoria

History
- Opened: 4 February 1890; 136 years ago
- Original company: West Coast Railway (19 September 1993 - 31 August 2004)

Services
Five return journeys per weekday to Southern Cross
Three return journeys per weekend to Southern Cross
Preceding station	V/Line	Following station
Sherwood Park towards Southern Cross	Warrnambool line	Terminus
Location
- Location within Victoria

Warrnambool railway station is a regional railway station and the terminus of the Warrnambool line, part of the Victorian railway network. It serves the city of Warrnambool, in Victoria, Australia. Warrnambool station is a ground level premium station, featuring one side platform. It opened on 4 February 1890.

It is the southernmost passenger railway station on the Australian mainland that is still in use today. Some lines during the Victorian Railways era, such as the Timboon and Crowes lines, did venture further south however none are in existence today.

Beyond the station, the line continues for a further five kilometres to Dennington, and is used by freight trains.

== History ==
On 26 April 1988, that section officially changed to being worked as a siding, and the train staff previously used for train movements between Warrnambool and Dennington was abolished. Beyond Dennington, the line used to continue for a further 37 kilometres to Port Fairy. That section was closed in November 1977.

On 14 July 2008, the siding serving the freight shed at the eastern (up) end of the station was booked out of use, and the track was removed. The goods shed itself was demolished in August 2018, due to its poor structural condition.

As part of the Regional Rail Revival project, passenger services on the line are set to increase to five per weekday from 2022, after upgrade works along the line are completed and the commissioning of a passing lane at Boorcan, located between Camperdown and Terang stations. As part of this project, stabling facilities are also to be upgraded at Warrnambool, to allow VLocity trains to stable.

Announced as part of a $21.9 million package in the 2022/23 Victorian State Budget, Warrnambool Station, alongside others, will receive accessibility upgrades, the installation of CCTV and platform shelters. The development process will begin in late 2022 or 2023, with a timeline for the upgrades to be released once construction has begun.

== Platforms and services ==
Warrnambool has one platform. It is serviced by V/Line Warrnambool line services.

Warrnambool platform arrangement
Platform	Line	Destination
1	Warrnambool line	Southern Cross

== Transport links ==
Transit South West operates three routes via Warrnambool station, under contract to Public Transport Victoria:

- 1 : Warrnambool – Dennington
- 5 : to Warrnambool (loop service via Lake Pertobe)
- 6 : Warrnambool – Merrivale

V/Line operates contracted road coach services from Warrnambool station to:

- Geelong station (via the Great Ocean Road)
- Ballarat station (via Ararat and Hamilton)
- Mount Gambier station (via Koroit, Port Fairy and Portland)

== Gallery ==
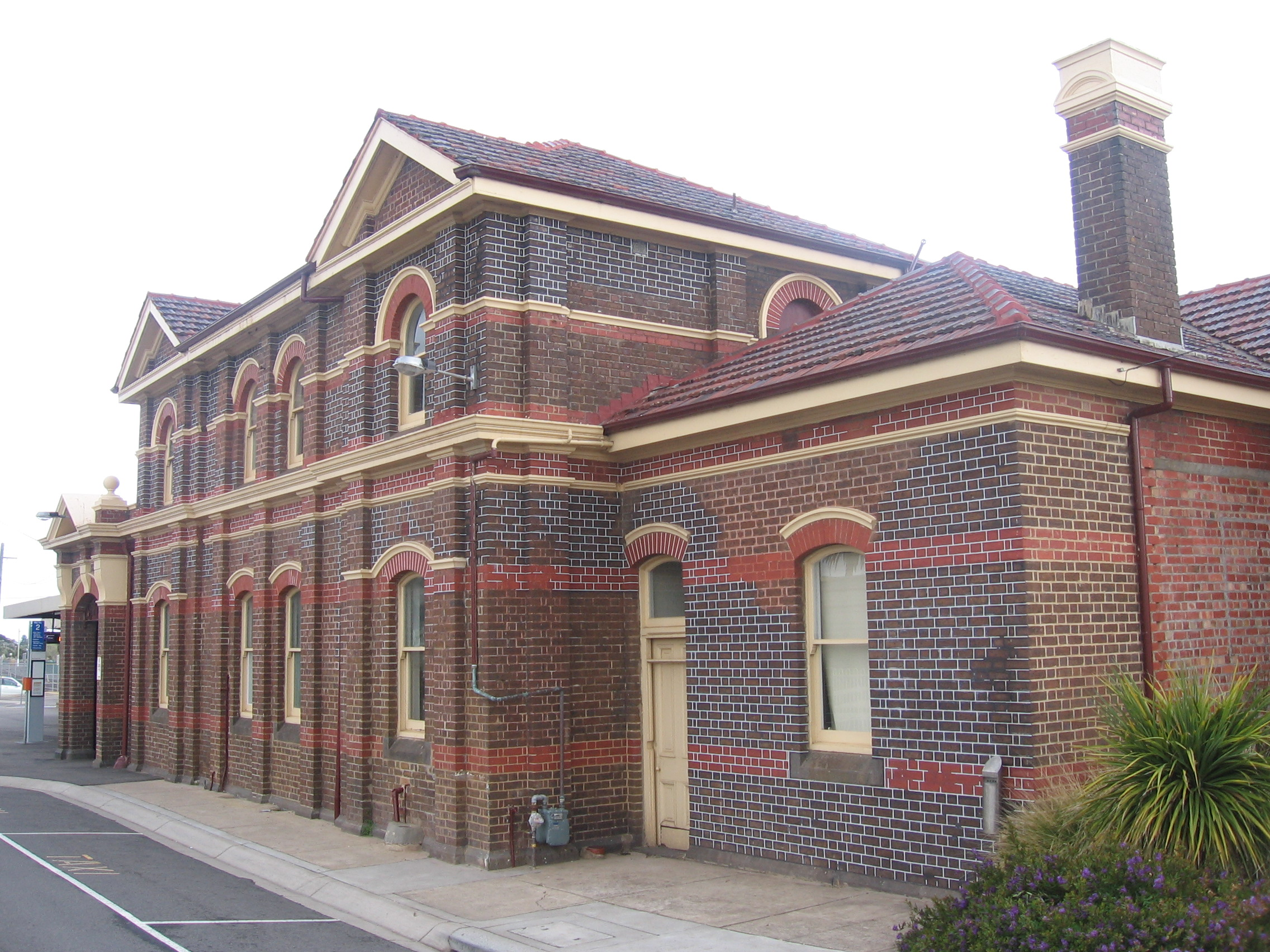
Station building and entrance, September 2008

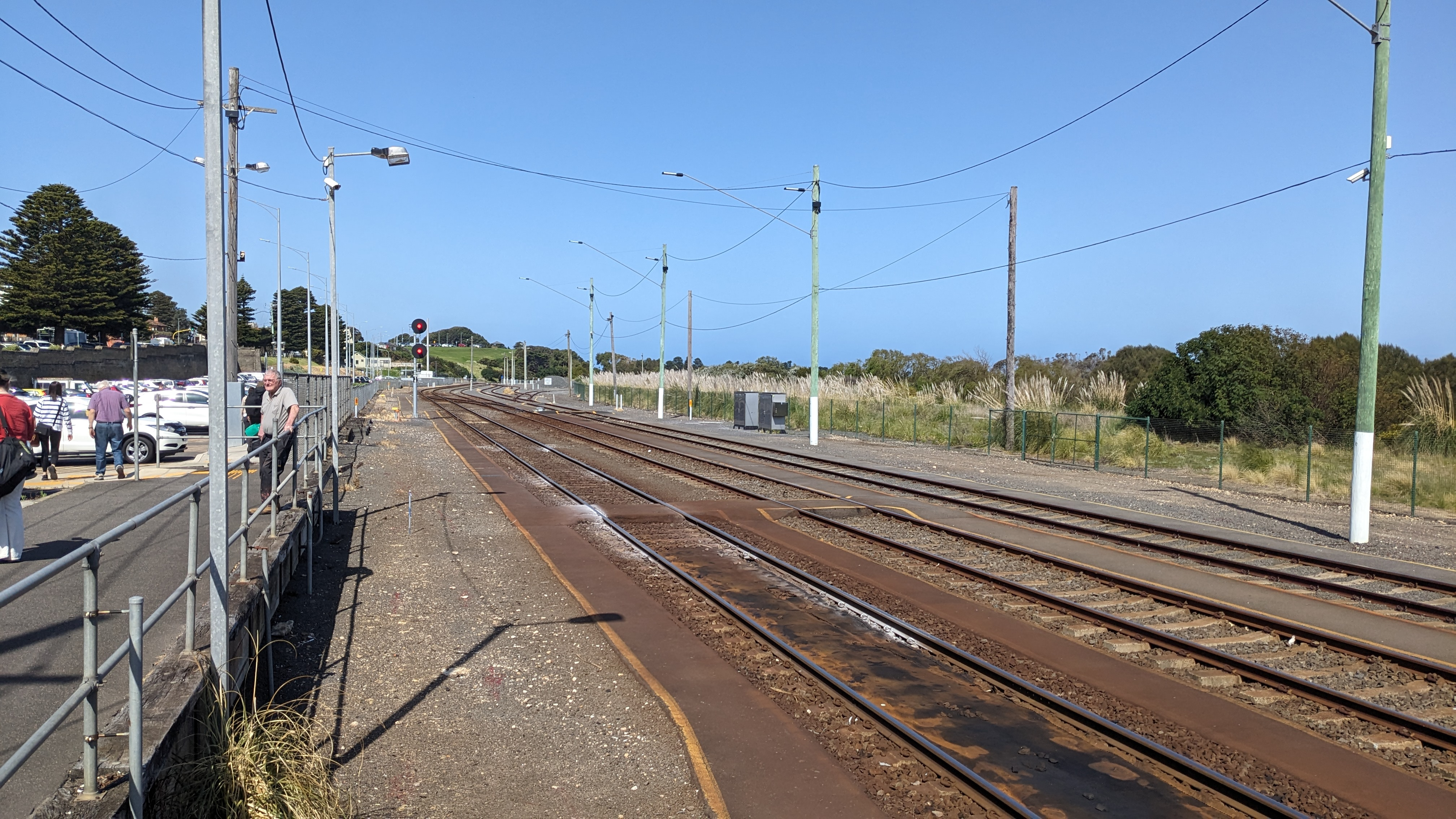
The train tracks at Warrnambool station, September 2023

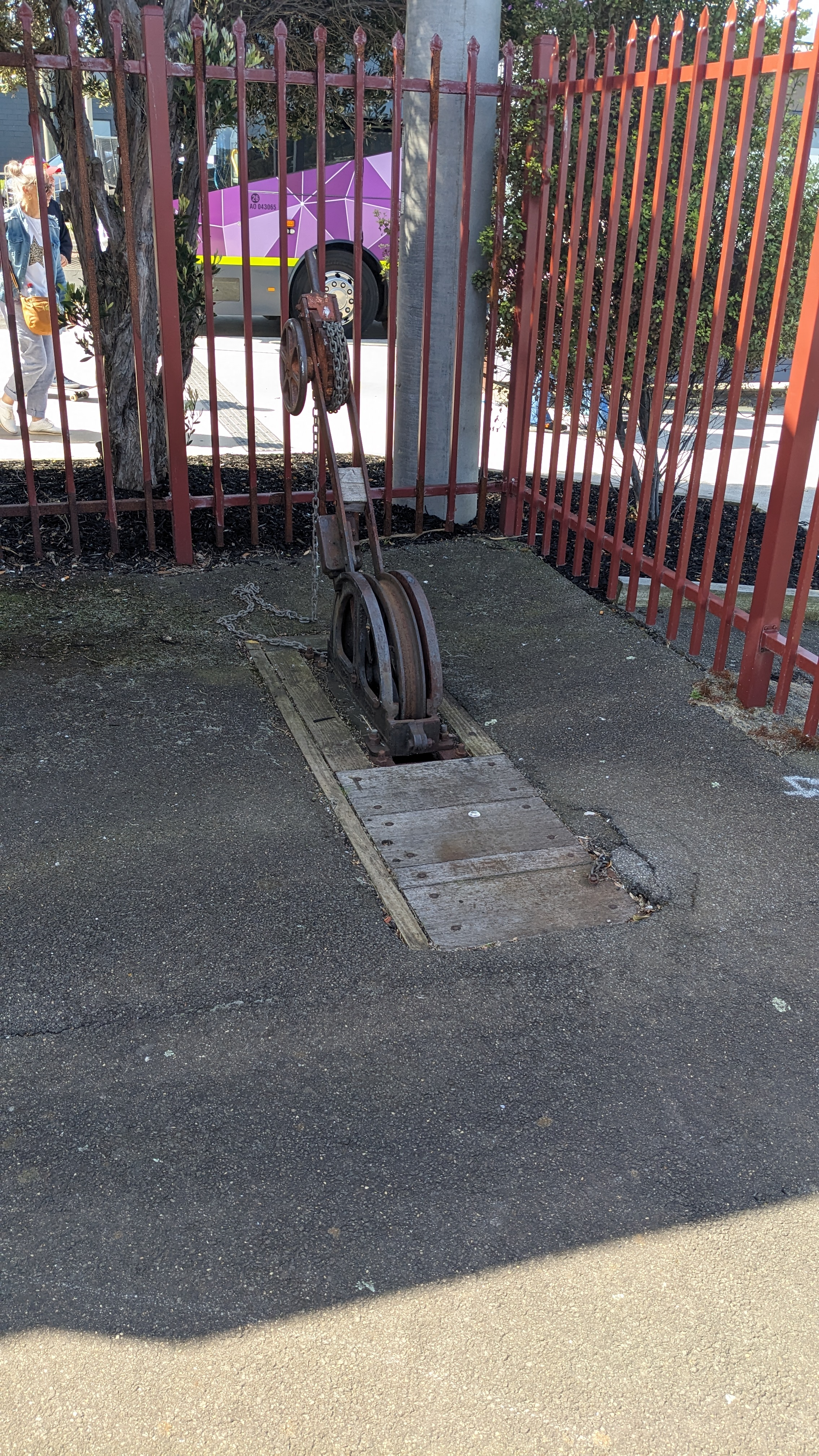
The old signalling equipment at the end of the station platform, September 2023

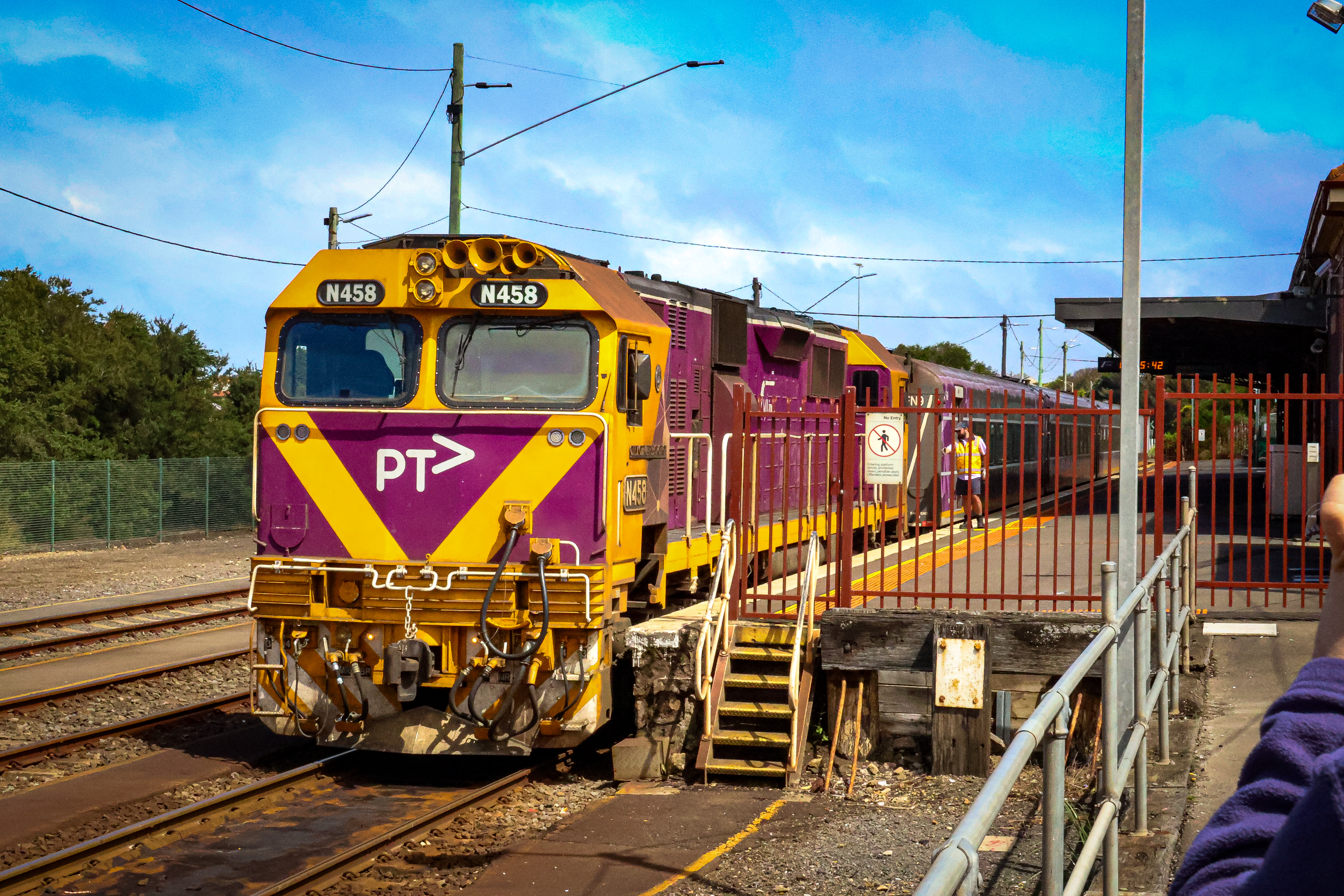
N Class locomotive N458 couples to carriages at Warrnambool.
