= Lonie Report =

Rail review in Victoria, Australia

The Victorian Transport Study, better known as the Lonie Report, was an extensive study of freight and passenger transport within the state of Victoria, Australia. The study was set up on 13 June 1979 by the Government of Victoria, and the report was published on 26 September 1980.

Murray Lonie, a retired executive of General Motors and BHP, was appointed to head the study, and the secretary was the head of the Country Roads Board, Robin Underwood.

== Scope and aims ==
In the words of the authors, the Lonie Report aimed to:

institute a study into all freight and passenger transport within Victoria, and to and from Victoria, in order to produce a co-ordinated transport system capable of meeting the needs of all residents of Victoria, having particular regard to the effect of transport on the balanced development of the State.

To some extent, the Lonie Report followed on from the Bland Report, a 1972 inquiry into land transport in Victoria by Sir Henry Bland, but was extended to cover a much greater number of topics, including, but not limited to, ports and air transport. There were special sections for the transport of certain important commodities, including cement and grain.

== Study and recommendations ==
Between June and December 1979, 41 individuals, 21 government agencies, and 28 of the (then) 211 Victorian local government areas, wrote submissions to the study, as did a large number of lobby groups representing various positions on the question of transport planning.

The writing of the report was done between December 1979 and its final publication in September 1980. It was presented to Transport Minister, Rob Maclellan, and was released as a total of twenty-five volumes and a final report, containing recommendations on every topic covered.

The Lonie Report argued that, despite the immense change in demand for various modes of transport since the beginning of the twentieth century, the system was still run by methods that dated from the nineteenth century. It argued for large-scale deregulation of transport markets, especially by the removal of the current restrictions on the carriage by road of such goods as cement, sawn timber, fertilisers and grain.

The report was particularly concerned about the operating losses made by the railway system, due to significant declines in patronage, and large increases in car ownership. The report argued that it would be much too expensive to upgrade the rail system to be competitive with the car, or even with buses, and therefore:

- all country passenger rail services, except from Melbourne to Geelong, should be replaced by buses
- trains on the suburban Port Melbourne, St Kilda, Altona, Williamstown, Alamein, Upfield and Sandringham lines should be replaced by buses, as should the Hurstbridge line beyond Eltham.
- trams from the city to South Melbourne Beach, South Melbourne and St Kilda Beach, Camberwell and West Maribyrnong, Kew/Cotham Road to St Kilda Beach, North Richmond to Prahran (and, by default, North Richmond to St Kilda Beach) and Footscray to Moonee Ponds should be replaced by buses
- all night-time and weekend rail services be replaced by buses or multi-hire taxis
- fares should be increased more frequently to eliminate public subsidies as soon as possible
- already-closed rural freight lines should remain closed and be dismantled to recycle the sleepers and steel
- small-volume freight should be shifted from rail to road
- a multi-modal public transport fare system be developed
- a system of multi-hire taxis be instituted to provide public transport in new suburbs

The report stated that because of increasing demand, Victoria's major highways should be duplicated. It also argued for the reservation of land to allow the construction of road bypasses around major towns on those highways. Within Melbourne, it argued for extensions to the Eastern and South Eastern Freeways, for the linking of the West Gate Freeway to Port Melbourne, and for the building of a ring road around the city, claiming that those increases in road capacity were needed to meet the predicted demand for road transport. It also advocated a road bypass of Lilydale on the Maroondah Highway, and argued for the introduction of clearways on main suburban streets to speed up road traffic.

Another recommendation of the report was the staggering of school and work hours to spread out the demand on public transport services, which it said would reduce the overcrowding on those services during peak periods, and the number of under-used services at other times. The report argued that be done through employers being encouraged by government to develop more flexible hours.

== Influence ==
The release of the Lonie Report by the government of Rupert Hamer led immediately to severe criticism, particularly from the large number of people who used the rail services that the report recommended eliminating. As a result of public protests in the last three months of 1980, the Hamer Government was forced to reject a number of the report's recommendations. All tram services were retained, and the $115 million New Deal for Country Passengers, a plan for the reorganisation and revitalisation of country passenger rail services, was unveiled in February 1981.

The following country passenger rail lines were closed:

- Lilydale - Healesville: 1 March 1981
- Donald to Ballarat: March 1981
- Toolamba to Echuca: 2 March 1981
- Numurkah - Cobram: 27 April 1981
- Baxter - Mornington: 20 May 1981
- Frankston - Stony Point: June 1981
- Dandenong - Leongatha - Yarram: 6 June 1981
- Portland to Ararat: 12 September 1981

Some of those lines remained open for freight. Passenger services to Cobram, Stony Point and Leongatha were reinstated by the incoming Labor government. The Baxter to Mornington line became a heritage railway. The Cobram and Leongatha passenger services were closed again by the Kennett Government. Kennett himself publicly endorsed the Lonie Report.

The Hamer Government's plans to close several suburban rail lines were halted because of strong protests. However, the St. Kilda and Port Melbourne lines were converted to light rail a few years later. Late-night services on the Upfield Line were eliminated (they were restored in 1997) and a multimodal fare system was introduced that, unpredicted by the Report, boosted patronage to such an extent that historians believe it has been responsible for the survival of the system.

Despite those changes, the Lonie Report proved influential in transport planning, especially after the election of Jeff Kennett as premier. Indeed, the report could be seen as providing the basis for the "Linking Melbourne" project carried out during Kennett's seven years as Premier, and also for the elimination of the large number of regulatory mechanisms that governed transport in Victoria before the 1980s, which culminated in the privatisation of public transport in the 1990s. Some of the report's recommendations were carried out before Kennett became Premier, such as the linking of the South Eastern Freeway to the Mulgrave Freeway.

== Criticism ==
The Lonie Report has been heavily criticised since it was released. Professional transport planners generally believed that it only considered direct financial cost in making its recommendations. It has been faulted for not understanding that building additional road capacity induces demand for further major road construction by encouraging people to drive more often, thereby negating any benefit from building the road. The Public Transport Users Association argued that the report did not consider that further public transport service reductions would cause a vicious circle of greater declines in patronage, poorer cost recovery, and even larger deficits.

The fact that the Lonie Report was written by people with a vested interest in increasing road transport has also led transport academics to question its assumptions and conclusions. The 1991 Russell Report, written by Professor Bill Russell, claimed that the benefits of freeway building, which had been propagated by governments before and since the Lonie Report, were overstated.

Indeed, the Lonie Report could be seen as evidence for the relatively recent claims by academic Guy Pearse that car, mineral and fossil fuel lobby groups have long written government policy on energy and transport in Australia (see Greenhouse Mafia).

Perhaps more potent than criticisms based upon the alleged involvement of vested interests, the Lonie Report had, as an underlying assumption, falling levels of public transport patronage. It failed to foresee Melbourne's rapid population growth and increasing population density, due to immigration.

The Lonie Report noted the rapidly increasing levels of government subsidy to public transport. According to the report, cost recovery through fares was 53% for the Melbourne & Metropolitan Tramways Board and 49% for VicRail, both of which would now be considered high rates of cost recovery. Increasing subsidy levels has been a feature of public transport economics in more recent years, apparently acceptable to governments as a means of encouraging people to shift to public transport. The Lonie Report seems to have been predicated upon a view that high levels of subsidy would be unacceptable to government and voters alike, which has not proven to be the case.

== See also ==
- Ashworth Improvement Plan
- Operation Phoenix
- 1969 Melbourne Transportation Plan
- New Deal
- Regional Fast Rail project
- Victorian Transport Plan
- List of Victoria Government Infrastructure Plans, Proposals and Studies
