= 1969 Melbourne Transportation Plan =

State planning in Victoria, Australia

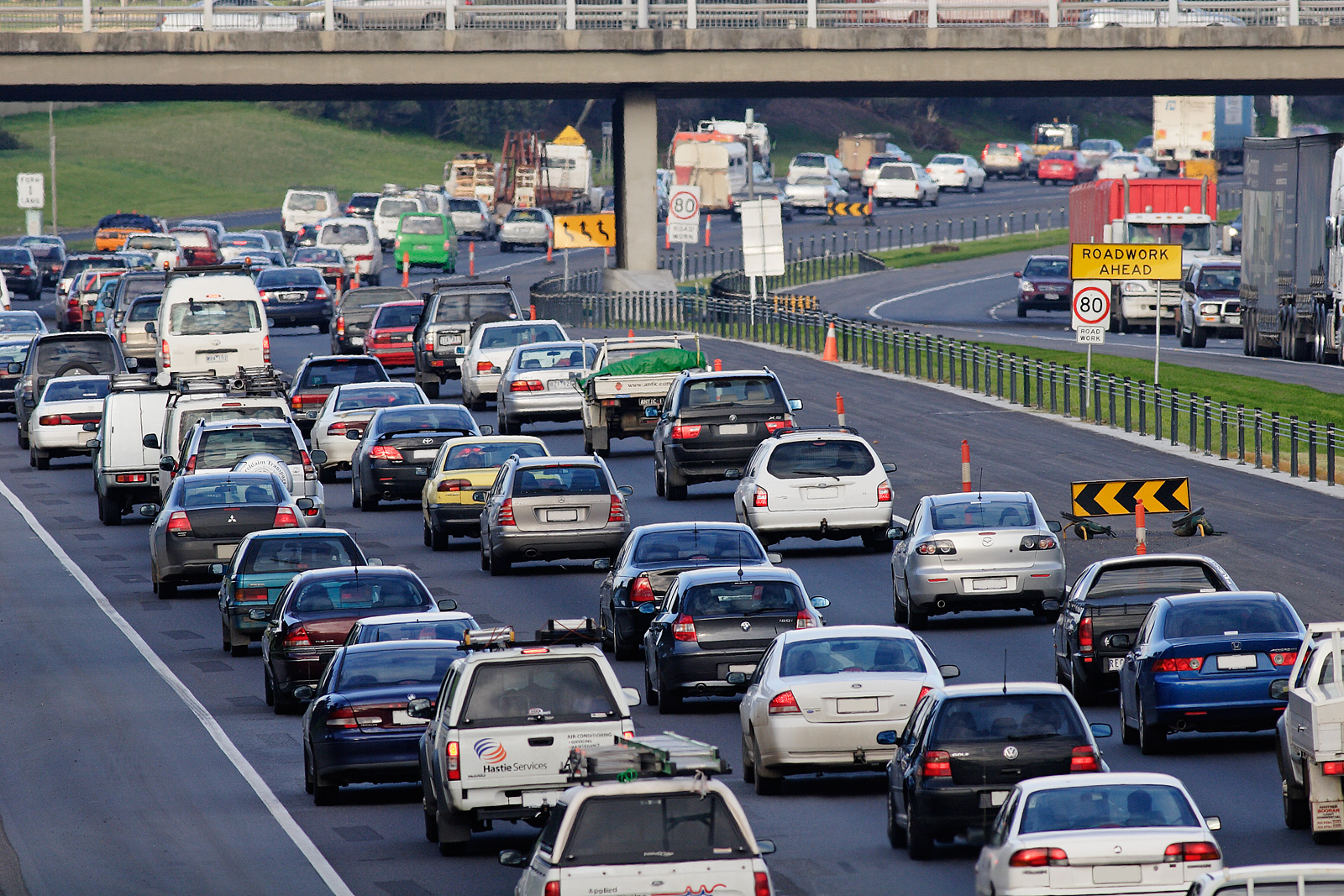
Congestion on the Monash Freeway

The 1969 Melbourne Transportation Plan was a road and rail transport plan for Melbourne, the state capital of Victoria, Australia, instituted by Henry Bolte's state government. Most prominently, the plan recommended the provision of an extensive freeway network, much of which has since been built.

Despite the majority of the printed material being devoted to non-car transport, 86 per cent of the projected budget was devoted to roads and parking, with only 14 per cent to other forms of transport. The plan recommended 510 kilometres (320 mi) of freeways for metropolitan Melbourne, as well as a number of railways. Of the latter, only the City Underground Loop was constructed. Proposed lines to Doncaster and Monash University (now Clayton Campus), and between Dandenong and Frankston, were never built.

The plan was described by J.M. Thompson in Great Cities and their Traffic as "clearly ... a highway plan, not – as it is called – a comprehensive transport plan", and by historian Graeme Davison as "the most expansive and expensive freeway experiment in Australian history".

In 1973, some freeway plans were pruned, especially those proposed for the inner city, with State Premier Rupert Hamer cancelling all the road reservations for the unbuilt urban freeways in 1976.

Some significant outer suburban freeway projects, under new branding, were built by subsequent governments, including CityLink (by the Kennett government in the 1990s), EastLink (by the Bracks government in the 2000s), Peninsula Link (by the Brumby and Baillieu governments in the 2000s and 2010s) and the Mordialloc Bypass (by the Andrews government in the 2020s).

== Background ==
The plan consisted of three volumes:

- Survey – completed for the Melbourne Transportation Committee by Wilbur Smith & Associates and Len T Frazer & Associates
- Parking – completed for the Melbourne Transportation Committee by Wilbur Smith & Associates and Len T. Frazer & Associates
- The Transportation Plan – completed by the Melbourne Transportation Committee.

The scope of the plan specified surveys of vehicular and personal travel, transport facilities, goods movement by road and rail, and central city parking. It built on the previous major Melbourne Transport Plans:

- 1929 Plan of General Development, Melbourne by the Metropolitan Town Planning Commission, and
- 1954 Melbourne Metropolitan Planning Scheme by the Melbourne Metropolitan Board of Works

and the minor

- 1961 Metropolitan Street Service Study by Traffic Commission Victoria.

=== Goals ===
The goals of the plan were to:

- ensure safe, comfortable and efficient movement of people and goods throughout the design area
- maintain a proper balance between public and private transport
- make maximum use of the existing facilities and plans and the commitments already embodied in these plans
- provide a transport service matched to the expectant demand throughout the design area
- provide a system that could be adapted to meet changing conditions and be expanded beyond the design year
- provide a transport network which could be implemented with as little interference to the commercial and community structure as possible

=== Funding ===
The costs of the development of the plan were shared by the four participating authorities:

- Melbourne & Metropolitan Board of Works
- Victorian Railways Commissioners
- Melbourne & Metropolitan Tramways Board
- Country Roads Board

Minor contributions were provided by Melbourne City Council and the Transport Regulation Board.

=== Methodology ===
The process adopted was:

- Inventory of transport facilities, travel and developmental features of the study area
- Forecast of 1985 travel requirements (estimated population of 3.7 million)
- Evaluation of tentative 1985 plan
- Periodic review

=== Organisation ===
The organisation required to develop the plan included:

- Metropolitan Transportation Committee – a statutory body established in 1963 to advise government on all transport factors (and produce the third volume of the plan)
- Technical Committee – consisting of senior representatives of transportation and other authorities on the main committee, its job was to oversee all technical matters arising during surveys and preparation of the plan
- Consultants – Wilbur Smith and Associates (from New Haven, Connecticut) and Len T Frazer and Associates (Melbourne)
- Study Group – engineers who were assigned from participating authorities to be trained by the consultants and assist in data collection and analysis This group was expanded to include economists responsible for costing the final plan

== Road ==
The plan proposed a budget of:

- $1.675 billion for freeways
- $64 million for divided arterial roads
- $28 million on new arterial roads
- $359 million on widening existing roads and bridges
- $95 million for road/rail 80 grade separations

=== Major radial ===
- F4 West Calder Freeway - Built 1970–present
- F9 West Lower Yarra Freeway (Now known as the West Gate Freeway), Built 1971-1978
- F14 East Southeastern Freeway (Now known as the Monash Freeway), Built 1972-2003
- F14 West Tullamarine Freeway - Built 1965-1979
- F19 Eastern Freeway - Partly built 1977-1997

=== Minor radial ===
- F1 Collingwood Freeway (Originally to connect the F9 Freeway at Southbank to the F19 Freeway at Fitzroy, passing through East Melbourne and Collingwood) - Abandoned
- F2 North Hume Freeway (Originally to connect the Dingley Freeway to the now Hume Freeway at Thomastown) - Northern section partly built connecting Hume Freeway & Metropolitan Ring Road. Southern section - Abandoned
- F2 South Dingley Freeway - Partly built 1994–present, but not of freeway standard (Dandenong Bypass, South Road Extension and Westall Road Extension are part of the Dingley Arterial Project)
- F4 East Calder Freeway (Originally passing through the Pascoe Vale Road Alignment to the F7 Freeway at Templestowe) - Abandoned
- F5 East Greensborough Freeway - Partly built, but not of freeway standard (Greensborough Highway)
- F5 West Metro Ring Road (Originally to pass through Essendon, Maribyrnong, East Sunshine and Footscray) - Partly built as the Western Ring Road
- F6 North Chandler Freeway (Originally to connect the F5 Ring Road at Lalor to the F9 Freeway at Glen Iris) - Abandoned
- F6 South Nepean Freeway (Originally to connect the F9 Freeway at Glen Iris to the F35 Freeway at Frankston) – Partly built as the Mornington Peninsula Freeway 1975–present
- F9 East Healesville Freeway - Not built
- F12 Freeway (Originally through the Ballarat Road Alignment) - Abandoned
- F18 Freeway (Originally to connect the Northern Ring Road at Greensborough to the Eastern Freeway at Manningham) - Abandoned (See North East Link)
- F35 South Frankston Freeway - Built 1962-1973

=== Inner city bypasses ===
- F9 Southern Bypass (Now known as CityLink), Built in 1997
- F14 Western Bypass (Now known as CityLink), Built in 1997

=== Ring roads ===
- F3/F5 Western Ring Road - Built 1992-1997
- F5/F7 Northern Ring Road (Now known as the Metropolitan Ring Road), Partly Built 1996-1999
- F35 North Scoresby Freeway/Eastern Ring Road (Now known as Eastlink), Built in 2008

A North East Link between the eastern and northern ring roads was originally designed but construction has begun as of 2020 with major works to begin mid 2021.

=== Parking ===
The plan included a proposed budget of $40 million for improvements in parking in the Melbourne central business district.

== Buses ==
The plan included a proposed budget $58 million for bus improvements:

- $50 million for 2,540 new buses
- $8 million for new bus depots

== Rail ==
Diagram showing Melbourne's rail network, including former and planned lines

The forecast budget for railway projects was $242 million. Planned rail projects included:

- Melbourne Underground Rail Loop (estimated at $80 million and opened in stages from 1981)
- Three new railway alignments and one extension (budgeted for $60 million):
  - Victoria Park - East Doncaster line (not built; now part of the PTV Network Development Plan)
  - Huntingdale - Ferntree Gully extension - Rowville Line (not built; now part of the PTV Network Development Plan)
  - Dandenong - Frankston line (not built)
  - Altona - Westona extension (built as part of the Altona - Laverton extension, opened 1985)
- $8 million for extension of suburban electric service along existing lines to Werribee (completed 1983), Rockbank (electrification to Melton to come), Sunbury (completed to Sydenham in 2002, and Sunbury in 2012), Craigieburn (completed in 2007), Coldstream (line now closed), Hastings (not done) and Mornington (line now closed)
- $42 million for route capacity improvements on existing lines (upgrades to automatic signalling, duplication of 19 miles (31 km) of single track and 33 miles (53 km) of new express tracks in existing rights of ways)
- $2 million for new stations to be built on existing lines
- $35 million on additional suburban trains
- $15 million on modal interchanges (substantial increase in car and bus parking at suburban railway stations)

== Trams ==
The plan included a proposed budget $55 million for 910 new trams.

== See also ==
- Transport in Melbourne
- Ashworth Improvement Plan
- Operation Phoenix
- Lonie Report
- New Deal
- Regional Fast Rail project
- Victorian Transport Plan
- List of Victoria Government Infrastructure Plans, Proposals and Studies

Adelaide:

- Metropolitan Adelaide Transport Study - analogous 1968 transport plan.

Hobart:

- Hobart Area Transportation Study - Urban transport plan for Metropolitan Hobart area, published in 1965.
