= Rail transport in Victoria =

Overview of rail transport in Victoria, Australia

Railways of Victoria

- Victorian railway network as at 2014, passenger lines in colour, freight only lines in grey

Overview
- Locale: Victoria, Australia
- Dates of operation: 1854–present

Technical
- Track gauge: 1,600 mm (5 ft 3 in) broad gauge, 1,435 mm (4 ft 8 1/2 in) standard, some 1,067 mm (3 ft 6 in) and 762 mm (2 ft 6 in) narrow gauge
- Length: 1712 km passenger, 4140.2 km total.

Rail transport in the Australian state of Victoria is provided by a number of railway operators who operate over the government-owned railway lines. The network consists of 2,281.4 km of Victorian broad gauge (1,600 mm (5 ft 3 in)) lines, and 1,805.5 km of standard gauge (1,435 mm (4 ft 8 1/2 in)) freight and interstate lines; the latter increasing with gauge conversion of the former. Historically, a few experimental 762 mm (2 ft 6 in) gauge lines were built, along with various private logging, mining and industrial railways. The rail network radiates from the state capital, Melbourne, with main interstate links to Sydney and to Adelaide, as well as major lines running to regional centres, upgraded as part of the Regional Fast Rail project and the Regional Rail Revival project.

The government-owned VicTrack owns all railway and tram lines, associated rail lands and other rail-related infrastructure in Victoria, which it leases to Public Transport Victoria which then sublets assets and infrastructure as appropriate to rail and tram operators. The state has four railway networks:

- Metro Trains Melbourne operates Melbourne's electrified metropolitan network providing passenger services with Electric Multiple Units,
- V/Line operates the country passenger network with diesel trains,
- Australian Rail Track Corporation leases from VicTrack the standard gauge tracks from Melbourne to Albury and to Serviceton to operate the interstate Melbourne-Adelaide and Melbourne-Sydney services, and
- the grain network in the north west of the state, connected to the ports at Geelong and Portland. Freight services are operated by Southern Shorthaul Railroad, Pacific National and SCT Logistics (interstate and intrastate), and Qube Logistics (intrastate).

Victoria does not have a dominant mining base as with other states, and has traditionally been more dependent on agriculture for rail freight traffic. By the 1990s road transport had captured most general freight traffic, with an average of only 6.1 million tonnes of intrastate freight carried each year between 1996 and 1998; containers being the major cargo, followed by cement, logs, quarry products and steel.

== History ==
The first railway lines in Victoria were built in the 1850s, and were privately owned and operated. These started having financial problems and were taken over by the Government Railway Department (Victorian Railways), which was established by the Colonial Government and became a vertically integrated government service. This structure remained until corporatisation began in the 1970s, followed by privatisation in the 1990s.

The rail network reached a peak in 1942 but steadily declined, as branch and cross country lines were closed until the 1980s.

=== First lines ===
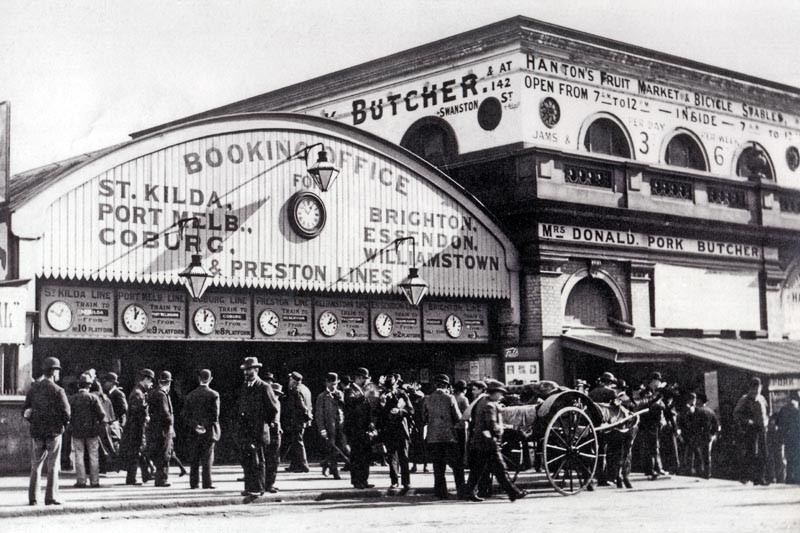
Pre 1910 Flinders Street station building

Australia's first steam-operated railway was a 4 km (2.5 mi) broad gauge line between the Melbourne (or City) Terminus (on the site of modern-day Flinders Street station) and Sandridge (now Port Melbourne). It was constructed by the Melbourne and Hobson's Bay Railway Company and opened in September 1854. The first country line in Victoria was from Melbourne to Geelong, which was opened in 1857 by the Geelong and Melbourne Railway Company. In the early years, the lines were constructed by private companies.

The suburban network expanded to the east from Princes Bridge to Richmond in 1859, then later to Brighton and Hawthorn by the early 1860s. The initial suburban lines were all built by different private companies centred on Flinders Street, which amalgamated into the Melbourne and Hobson's Bay United Railway Company by 1865; public ownership did not occur until 1878. In 1862, Victorian Railways lines had reached the great gold rush towns of Bendigo and Ballarat, and in 1864, railways were extended to the Murray River port of Echuca. In the 1870s, the Government Railway Department (Victorian Railways) started to build its own lines.

In 1883, the first connection to another colony's rail system was made, when the Albury-Wodonga line was completed to join the New South Wales Government Railways network at Albury, requiring a break-of-gauge to New South Wales' 1,435 mm (4 ft 8 1/2 in) (standard gauge). It was then followed in 1887 by a connection with the broad gauge South Australian Railways at Serviceton, with the Intercolonial Express (now The Overland) to Adelaide running between the capitals. Additional trunk lines were also built though the 1870s, with rails extended to Sale, Portland and Colac; and the first branch lines built. It was a time of improved train safety, with the first interlocking of railway signalling to protect trains provided in 1874, and tests of continuous train brakes carried out in 1884.

In 1884, Colonial Parliament passed The Railway Construction Act, which authorised fifty-nine new lines to almost every corner of the colony, and thus became known as the Octopus Act. The proposed lines would serve both new agricultural towns and support suburban land speculation. It was also this decade that the first narrow gauge line was opened from Wangaratta to Whitfield, with three other lines following by 1910. The South Gippsland line was also opened from Dandenong to Leongatha by 1891. However, by the late 1890s, the majority of the colony was now covered in railways, with the exception of the Mallee country in the north west of the colony which saw further line openings, such as the Mildura line in 1903.

=== The 20th Century ===
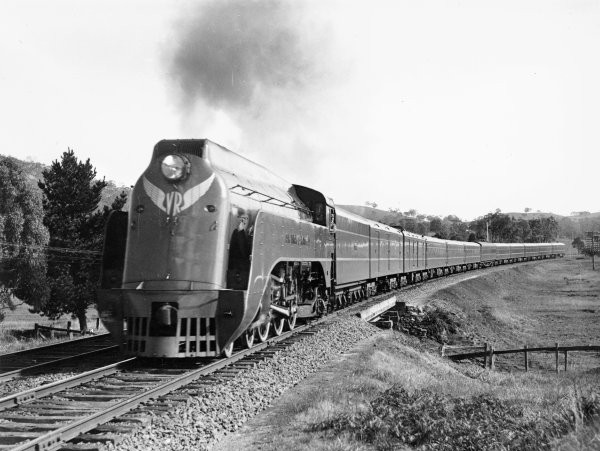
The Spirit of Progress headed by locomotive S301 Sir Thomas Mitchell near Kilmore East in 1938

In 1907, the A2 class steam locomotive was introduced. There were 185 locomotives in this class, and they were Victorian Railway's main passenger locomotive until the arrival of the diesel-electric B class in 1952. On 20 April 1908, the Sunshine train disaster occurred, killing 44 passengers in the worst Victorian railway accident.

Electrification of the Melbourne suburban network was also carried out, with the first train running in 1919. By 1924, 210,000 passengers passed through the main city terminal of Flinders Street station per weekday. St Kilda was Melbourne's busiest suburban station with 4½ million journeys, followed by Footscray with almost 4 million, then Elsternwick, Ascot Vale, Essendon and Balaclava. Technology advancements continued, with 3 position automatic signals introduced in 1915, the conversion of screw couplings to knuckle couplers from 1924, and the first remote controlled signalling provided in 1925. The first level crossing flashing lights were installed at Mentone on Moorabbin Road in 1932.

Despite World War I, significant extensions of rail lines were carried out, particularly in the wheat-growing areas in the north-west and west. The new lengthy parallel lines were considered to be cheaper to operate than the numerous short spurs such as those in the Goulburn Valley. By 1930, the railway map of Victoria was largely complete, with the best land settled and the remaining land marginal for agriculture, with several lines built across the state border into the Riverina of NSW. In November 1937, the first run of the Spirit of Progress was made, a streamlined all air-conditioned train run between Melbourne and Albury, led by the matching S class steam locomotives.

From 1924 to 1935, the Better Farming Train made 38 tours promoting improved agricultural practices.

The Victorian Railways biggest steam locomotive H 220 Heavy Harry entered service in 1941, at a time when the railways were struggling with the needs of the war effort. In 1943, the Victorian Railways employed 25,450, had 577 steam locos and 12 electric locos on register along with 19,823 goods wagons and 1,499 passenger cars, running along 4,758 miles (7,657 km) of lines. The network reached its largest extent in 1942, covering 7668 route kilometres.

=== Post war rebuilding ===
After World War II, the railways were run down, with Operation Phoenix unveiled in 1950, involving the expenditure of £80 million over 10 years. Works included electrification to Traralgon, new Harris suburban trains, the Walker railmotors, and approximately 3,000 new goods wagons.

On 14 July 1952, the Victorian Railways (VR) entered the diesel era, with the delivery of the first B class mainline locomotive, with the commissioning of the first mainline electrification scheme in Australia in July 1954 to Warragul. March 1954 saw Queen Elizabeth II tour Victoria by Royal Train, the first time a reigning monarch had travelled on the VR, 1954 also saw the last steam locomotive to enter service, J class 559, as well as the last four wheeled open wagons being built. The fifties also saw the loss of a number of short branch lines, particularly country where the only traffic had been timber or livestock.

In the 1960s, the break of gauge at Albury was eliminated, with the opening of the North East standard gauge line in 1962. The new line aided freight traffic between the state capitals, and enabled through passenger trains, such as the Southern Aurora and the Intercapital Daylight. At the same time, the sixties was also the end of steam, with the demolition of the massive North Melbourne Locomotive Depot on 20 January 1961.

1965 saw the Victorian Railways produce a £193,727 surplus, but by 1973, increasing costs and declining revenue resulted in a $86,086,361 deficit. On 20 July 1976, the Laverton derailment occurred, killing one passenger, in what was the last railway passenger fatality not involving a road vehicle. By the late seventies, roadside goods and country railmotor services had been replaced by road transport, and branch lines outside the grain producing areas were now virtually non-existent. The Lonie Report delivered in 1980 recommended the closure of all country passenger service except that to Geelong, elimination of a number of suburban railways, and moving small-volume freight from rail to road.

=== New deal ===
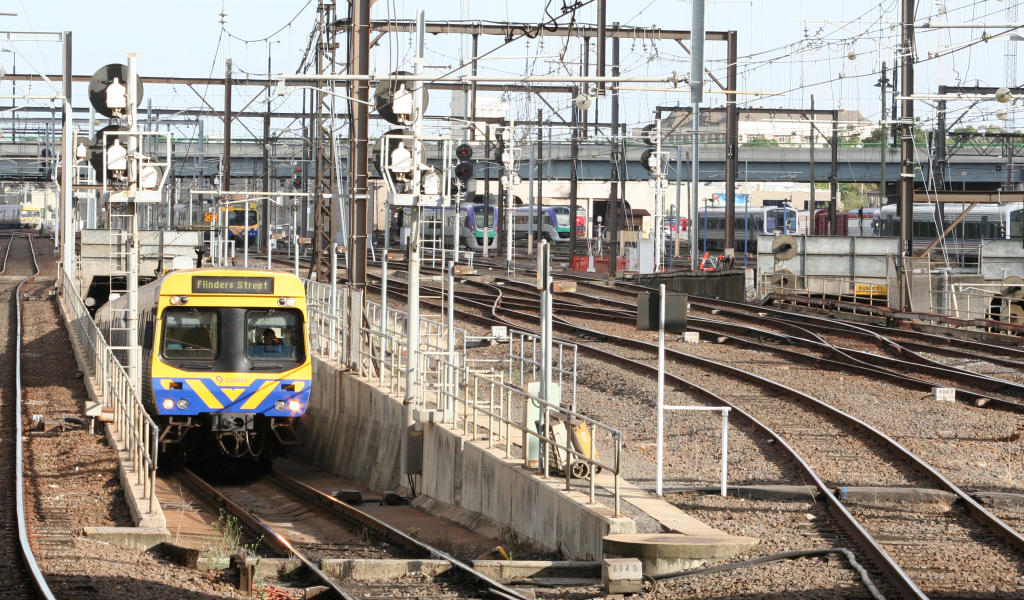
Train exiting the Melbourne underground loop

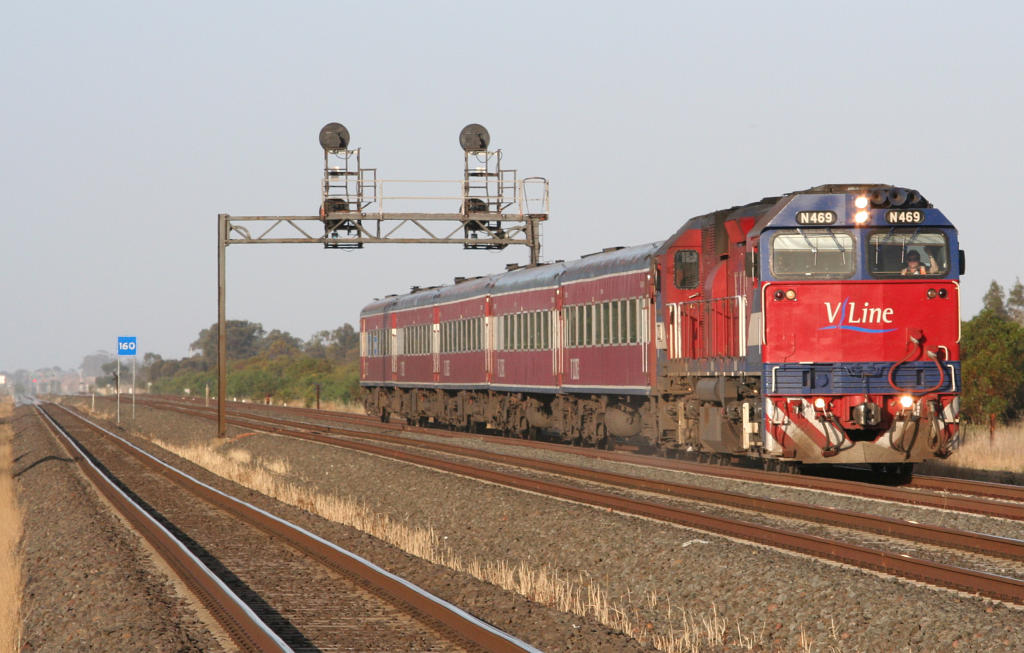
N class locomotive with N type country passenger carriages.

The 1980s saw corporatisation of the Victorian Railways carried out, with the railway commissioners replaced by VicRail and later government authorities. New liveries on trains were unveiled, as elderly "red rattlers" were replaced by new trains.

1981 saw the Melbourne underground loop open in January, followed by the new air conditioned Comeng suburban trains and "N" type country passenger carriages in September the same year. Country services were also sped up under the New Deal by the closure of 35 of small wayside stations. Country passenger services saw the last of the non-air-conditioned wooden bodied passenger cars withdrawn from service in 1986, replaced by new "H" set carriages. Trials were also carried out for further upgrades, with locomotive A85 re-geared for 160 km/h operation in a series of test runs between Glenorchy and Lubeck in the state's west in July 1986.

It was also the end of an era, with freight trains having their guards vans and guards abolished from 1985, and the carriage of livestock ended in 1986. The last run of the Spirit of Progress and Southern Aurora passenger trains were also made in 1986, on 3 August. Working practices were also altered, with through working of C class locomotives introduced between Melbourne and Adelaide in 1982. Previously Victorian locomotives were detached at the state borders, and replaced by locomotives from the next state. New locomotive were also introduced, with the G and N classes enabling the retirement of many of the 1st generation diesels.

Cuts continued to the rail network, with larger centralised silos in the north western area of the state, and replacement of traditional safeworking systems by systems that required no local staff caused further stations to be subsequently de-staffed.

=== Privatisation ===
The 1990s saw costs further reduced on the rail network. Guards were removed from passenger trains in 1989, and driver only suburban trains commenced running in 1993, with the last suburban train crewed by a guard running in November 1995. In 1994, the National Rail Corporation was established, taking profitable steel, and intermodal trafficks from V/Line; and the Melbourne to Adelaide standard gauge line was opened in 1995, removing the break of gauge.

Moves towards privatisation began in 1997, with V/Line split into V/Line Passenger and V/Line Freight and in 1998 Melbourne services operated by the Public Transport Corporation split into Bayside Trains and Hillside Trains. V/Line Freight was sold to Freight Victoria in 1999, followed by National Express taking over Bayside Trains and V/Line Passenger in 2000, with Connex Melbourne taking over Hillside Trains.

=== End of private lease ===
Victorian Premier Steve Bracks negotiated a premature end to the "under-rail" Victorian country Broad Gauge network lease just minutes before the caretaker mode began before the state election of November 2006. This cost around $125 million. In May 2008, Premier John Brumby arranged a 45-year lease to the Australian Rail Track Corporation of the single track Seymour-Albury section. Part of the negotiation involved Victoria contributing money for the track to be upgraded and standardised and for Wodonga to be bypassed.

Today, the state consists of four networks: the electrified metropolitan system operated by Metro Trains Melbourne, the country passenger network operated by V/Line and upgraded as part of the Regional Fast Rail project, the standard gauge interstate lines to Adelaide and Sydney, and the grain network in the north west of the state, connected to the ports at Geelong and Portland.

== Future expansion and upgrades ==
=== Regional Rail Revival ===
In 2017, the State Government under Premier Daniel Andrews initiated work on the Regional Rail Revival program, which allocated $1.75 billion to upgrade Victoria's regional railways and provide more reliable and frequent passenger services. The program was largely funded by the Federal Government, through the Commonwealth's asset-recycling fund.

The project allocated $518 million for upgrades to the Ballarat line, including 18 km of duplicated track between Deer Park West and Melton stations, new passing loops, new train stabling, upgraded stations and more car parking along the corridor. The Geelong line will see a new platform and track added to Waurn Ponds station and the investigation of a rail line to Armstrong Creek. The Gippsland line will have its signalling upgraded, some track duplicated, a new stabling facility built and platforms added to some stations. The North East, Shepparton and Warrnambool lines will see upgrades to allow VLocity trains to run on those corridors. The project will also include track speed and signalling upgrades to the Bendigo-Echuca line, with all projects aimed to be completed by 2022.

=== Faster rail ===
There have been numerous proposals for higher-speed passenger rail to regional Victoria. In 2018, the State Government allocated $50 million to plan for a high speed rail line to Geelong, and appointed a Fast Rail Reference Group of technical advisors. The Government suggested trains could run to Geelong and Ballarat at speeds up to 250 km/h, an increase on the 160 km/h limit of current VLocity trains. In 2019, the Federal Government pledged $2 billion for a fast rail line to Geelong, promising a travel time of 32 minutes. Business cases for faster rail to Albury-Wodonga and Greater Shepparton are currently being prepared for the National Faster Rail Agency, a federal body established in 2019.

== Infrastructure ==
Route-kilometres of open railway (December 2024)
Gauge	Electrified	Non-electrified
1067 mm (narrow)	0 km	0 km
1435 mm (standard)	0 km	1805.5 km
1600 mm (broad)	377.2 km	1904.2 km
Dual (standard/broad)	0 km	53.3 km

The trunk railway lines of Victoria are double track, some built as such, and others duplicated later on. Early sections of the suburban network were double track, with later additions being single track that were later duplicated.

The Bendigo and Geelong–Ballarat mainlines were both built as double track in the 1860s, but were singled in the 1930s and first decade of the 21st century respectively. The north-east line to Seymour was duplicated in the mid-1880s and remains so today, the Gippsland line to Moe was duplicated in the 1950s in conjunction with increased briquette traffic, and the busiest country line in the state to Geelong was progressively duplicated from 1959 to 1981.

Few railway tunnels exist in Victoria, with the exception of the Melbourne City Loop. The longest tunnel before the opening of the loop was on the Fyansford Cement Works Railway (near Geelong), where a 1300-metre-long tunnel existed on a narrow gauge quarry railway. Of those open today the longest is the single track 422-metre long Geelong Tunnel, followed by the double track 385-metre Elphinstone and the 390-metre-long Big Hill Tunnels on the Bendigo line. A 154-metre-long tunnel also exists on the Healesville line, as well as three tunnels on the suburban Hurstbridge line, and another on the freight lines under Footscray station.

On the interstate railway corridors, there are independent sections of track due to the use of both broad and standard gauges in the state, these sections being from Melbourne to Seymour and on to Albury (constructed in the 1960s), and Melbourne to Geelong (completed in 1995). The gauge issue also sees dual gauge track used, in areas including Maryborough, North Geelong, and various freight terminals in Melbourne.

The maximum speed of suburban electric multiple units and locomotive hauled trains is 115 km/h, with diesel multiple units permitted up to 130 km/h on the same track, and up to 160 km/h on specified lines. The maximum axle loading of freight wagons is 20 tonnes, with locomotives of up to 22 tonne axle loading operating. Train lengths are limited to 1200 metres, except on the main interstate lines where 1500 metre long trains are permitted.

=== Track gauge ===
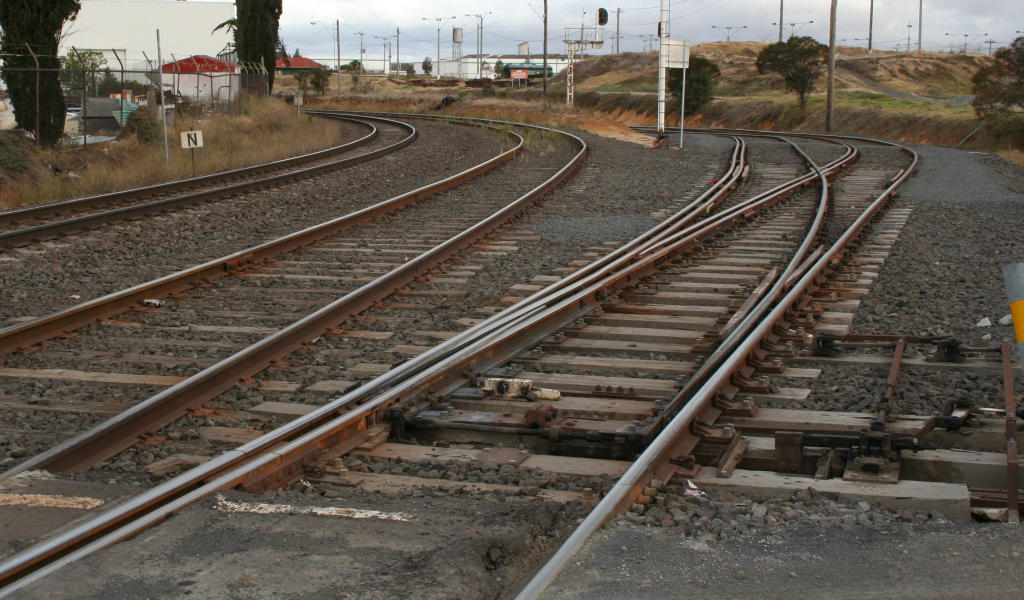
Dual gauge (broad and standard) track work

The majority of the railways of Victoria are of 1,600 mm (5 ft 3 in) broad gauge, presenting break-of-gauge difficulties when connections were made with New South Wales which uses 1,435 mm (4 ft 8 1/2 in) standard gauge. In addition, the Victorian Railways experimented with four short narrow gauge lines of 762 mm (2 ft 6 in) in the early 20th century. Efforts to eliminate the gauge issue were proposed many times in the intervening years, with a Royal Commission in 1921 deciding "that the gauge of 4-ft. 8.5-in. be adopted as the standard for Australia; that no mechanical, third rail, or other device would meet the situation, and that uniformity could be secured by one means only, viz., by conversion of the gauges other than 4-ft. 8.5-in."

By the 1950s, interstate traffic was suffering from the break-of-gauge at the New South Wales state border, and a parallel standard gauge line was opened from the Melbourne to join the New South Wales system in 1962, along with a bogie exchange depot to allow wagons to operate across the broad and standard gauge networks. The second interstate link from Victoria to Adelaide (the oldest single-gauge inter-capital line dating from 1887) was converted from broad to standard gauge in 1995 enabling rail traffic from Victoria to access the rest of the nation without disruption.

Today, the standard gauge network consists of the two main interstate lines, and a number of branch lines in the far west of the state. Gauge conversion of 2000 kilometres of track was announced in May 2001 by the Victorian Government under the Linking Victoria program, but did not proceed due to the difficulty of achieving any agreement with then track manager, Freight Australia. The works would have covered 13 lines, including the Mildura line via Geelong, Ballarat, and Maryborough; the north western Victorian grain network; and the lines centred upon Seymour and Benalla in the north east. Conversion of the regional and suburban passenger networks is not envisioned. In 2008, the conversion of the North East line was announced, with the conversion of 200 kilometres (120 mi) of broad gauge track to standard gauge between Seymour and Albury providing double track along the section.

The Murray Basin Rail Project, commenced in 2014, aimed to convert the Mildura, Manangatang, and Sea Lake lines to standard gauge, in order to allow the grain traffic in the state's north-west to access the ports of Portland, Geelong, and Melbourne, and to enable other freight on the lines to access the national standard gauge network. The converted Mildura line reopened in 2018, but standardisation of the Sea Lake and Manangatang lines was deferred until 2020 due to the collapse of the major works contract.

=== Loading gauge ===
The Victorian loading gauge for vehicles is sized between that of British and American practices. Wagons may be up to 22.85 metres (75.0 feet) long, 2.97 metres (9 feet 9 inches) wide, and carry loads up to 4.27 metres above the rail height. Double stacking of container wagons is not possible under these limits, with 2,655 mm (8 ft 8.5 in) high containers the largest permitted, with the exception of 3,200 mm (10 ft 6 in) high containers on some routes. Trials were made with the 4D double deck passenger train on some suburban lines, requiring alterations to overhead bridges and structures, but no double deck trains are used today.

=== Signalling ===
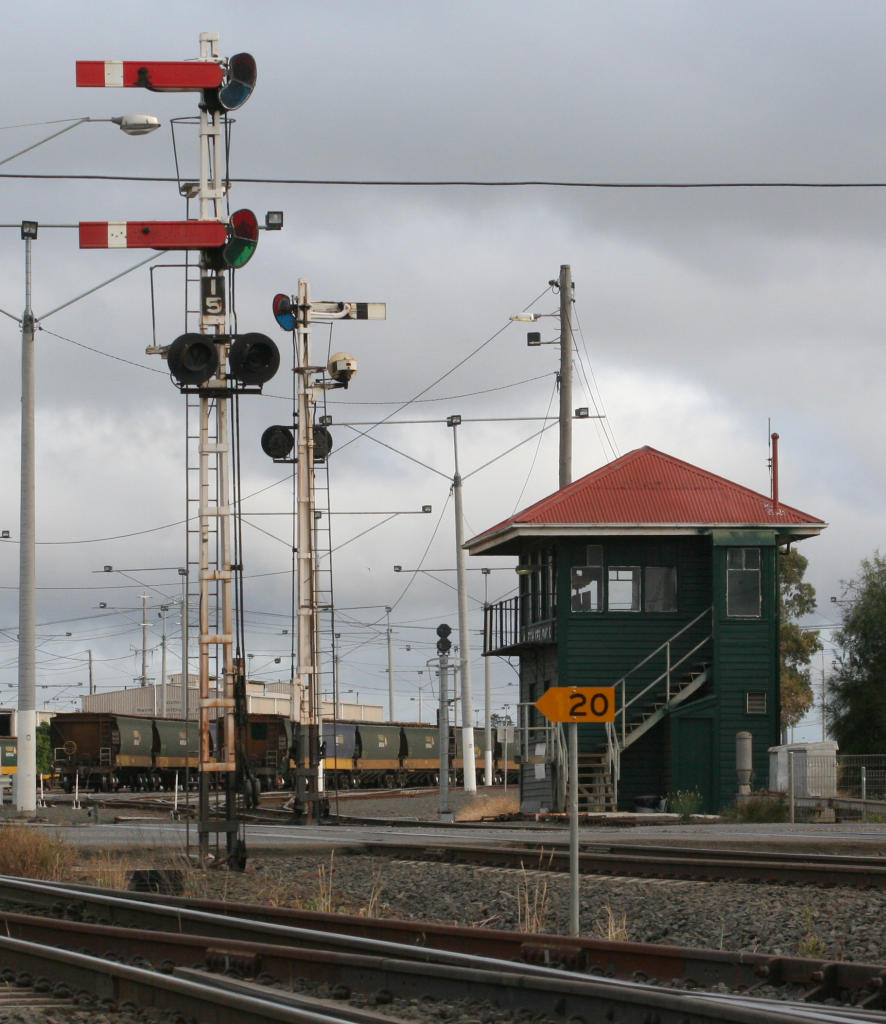
Former mechanical two-position semaphore signalling at North Geelong

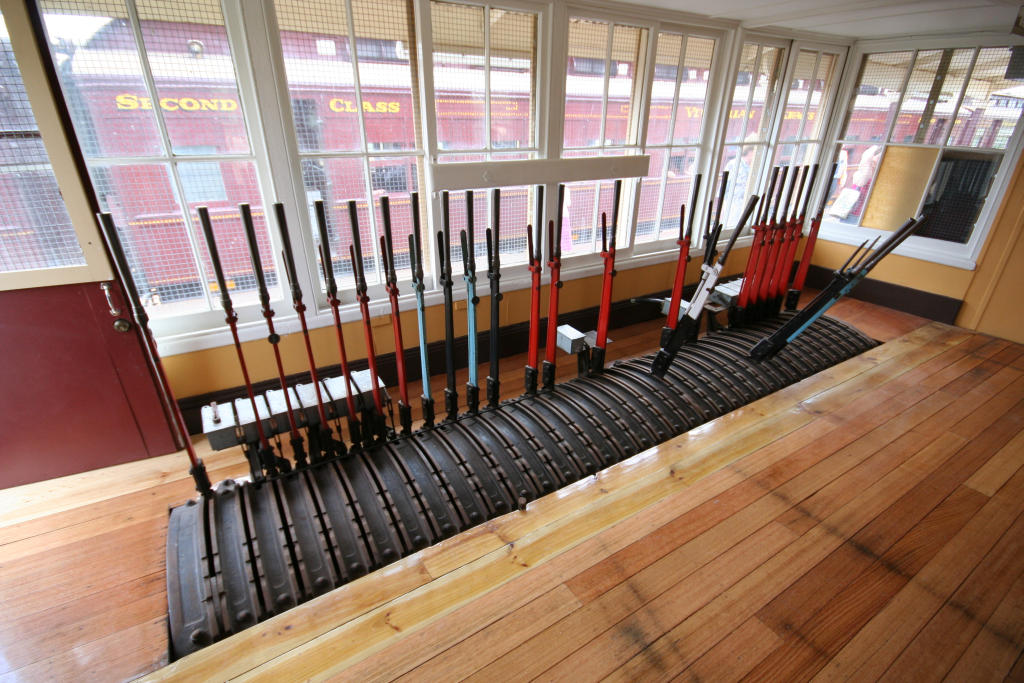
Former mechanical interlocking frame for signal control at Avenel

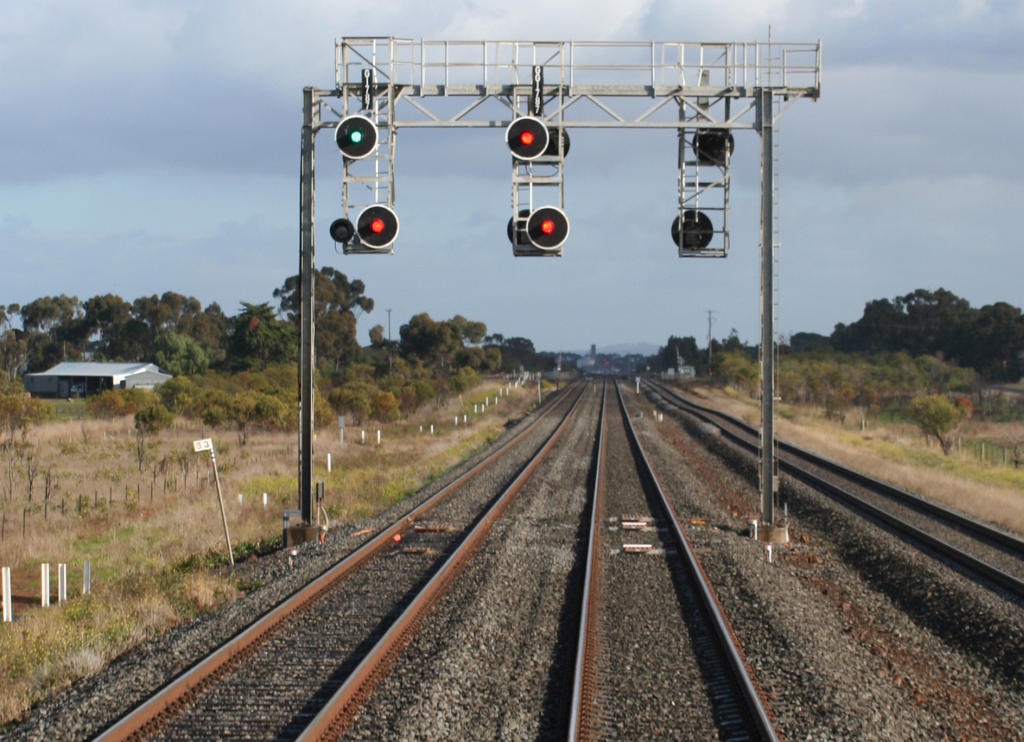
Modern LED colour light 3 position signalling

Victoria uses a mix of railway signalling practices: British route signalling with home and distant signals (2 position signalling) and American speed signalling (3 position signalling).

Semaphore signals were used on the very first railway lines, but only a bare minimum were provided as the time interval system being relied upon instead. The first interlocking of signals to protect trains was provided in 1874, as before this time conflicting moves could be made. The design of the signals also progressed, with the disc type siding signals first introduced in 1885, and the lower quadrant somersault type main line signals adopted in 1887, both of which are still in use today. Green was not adopted as the All Right colour until 1898, with white being used before this time. Red was the usual colour of all signal arms, until yellow was chosen as the colour for distant signals in 1926, with full adoption made in 1930. Colour light signals first appeared in 1918, and by 1924 they were the standard for new installations.

The safeworking of trains between stations on the early lines was time interval working, where a train would be allowed to leave a given time after the train before it. With heavier traffic this method became unsafe, with Staff and Ticket working on single lines adopted from 1873, and telegraph block working from 1878 on double lines. Both of these systems ensured that only one train would be in a section of track at one time. Telegraphic block working was then replaced with Winters Block working between 1883 and 1888, a system that is a predecessor of the Double line Block system which is still used today. Later years saw variations made to the Staff and Ticket system, with busier lines provided with Electric Staff working which provided greater safely when more trains ran.

Heavier suburban traffic on the Melbourne network saw a greater strain on the block working then used, which required a large number of staffed signal boxes to enable trains to run close together. As a result, it was decided to adopt power signalling under the Automatic Block System (ABS) of safeworking, where the presence of trains automatically control the signals after them, providing a safe distance between trains. Introduced from 1915, the system was based on American speed signalling practice with GRS2A upper quadrant mechanical signals with two arms able to indicate up to 5 different speed aspects to train drivers. These signals were later replaced by colour light signals which are the standard today, but the old mechanical style remained until 2001.

A variant of the Automatic Block System, Automatic and Track Control (ATC) has since been introduced, which provides the same benefits as ABS on single lines of track, while still ensuring only one train in a section at a time. Centralised Traffic Control was also introduced in the 1960s on the new standard gauge line to Albury, and then on the main interstate line to Adelaide, allowing trains to be directed from a distance.

Today, little mechanical signalling remains, with local signal boxes controlling signals abolished from many areas as part of the Regional Fast Rail project. The suburban network and busier regional lines use variants of Automatic Block Signalling, while quieter lines use the Train Staff and Ticket or Train Order systems of safeworking. Train protection has also progressed, with the Train Protection & Warning System also introduced on major passenger lines as part of the Regional Fast Rail project.

== Rolling stock ==
Rollingstock in Victoria has used air braking since tests of continuous train brakes were carried out in 1884. Initially, screw couplings were used to connect wagons, but from 1924, automatic knuckle couplers were introduced, with buffers removed from freight wagons by 1960.

=== Locomotives ===
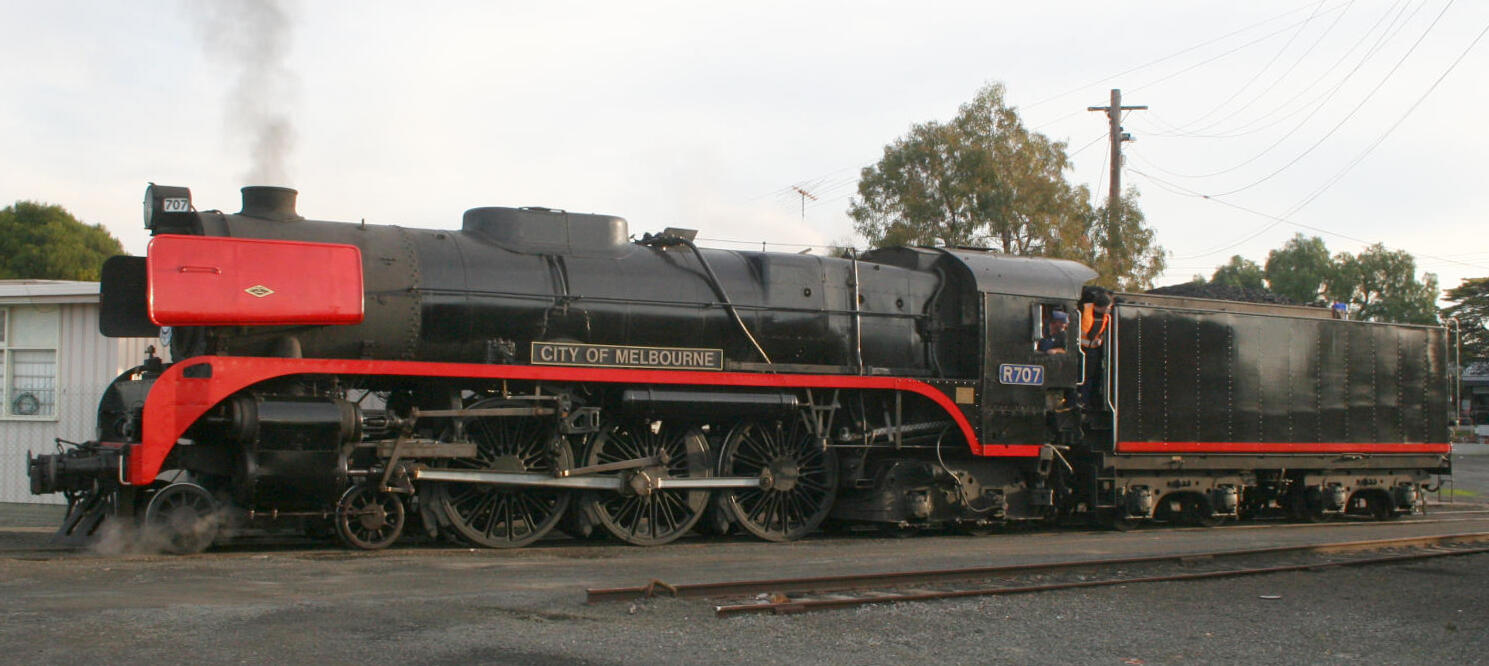
Preserved R class steam locomotive

In Victoria, groups of locomotives of the same design are classed together by letter, in a system introduced in 1886. Initially, low letters were given to passenger classes, and high letters for goods classes, but from about 1916, this pattern was discarded. Within classes locomotives are individually numbered, in a continuous number block which is unique to the class. In some cases, locomotives have been renumbered to keep number blocks continuous, and in some cases there is no correlation between the number blocks used for the steam and diesel locomotives of the same class letter. In addition, some classes start the number series with a 0, while others start with a 1.

The first locomotives used in the state were small steam locomotives, and by the end of the 19th century 0-6-0 tender engines were used on goods, and 4-4-0 configurations for passenger workings. The majority of locomotives were imported from Britain, from companies such as Beyer, Peacock & Company, Robert Stephenson & Company, R & W Hawthorn and George England and Co. The Williamstown Workshops also built locomotives locally, as did the Phoenix Foundry in Ballarat.

As the size of trains increased, so did the locomotives. The 4-6-0 wheel arrangement became popular for passenger and mixed traffic work with the D3 and A2 classes, and the 2-8-0 arrangement on goods with the K, J and C classes lasting into the 1960s. These were then followed by the 4-6-2 S class Pacifics for the Spirit of Progress express, and the single 4-8-4 H class locomotive H220, the biggest Victorian Railways steam locomotive. The final steam locomotives built for the Victorian Railways were the 4-6-4 R class and 2-8-0 J classes. Although they were of more modern design, their advantages were overshadowed by the simultaneous arrival of the first diesels.

Electric locomotives were first acquired with the electrification of the suburban railways, the E class suburban engines acquired in 1923 and 1928–29, followed by the L class from 1953 when the mainline to Traralgon was electrified for briquette traffic.

Dieselisation occurred from 1951 with the F class shunter, but the B and S classes of 1952 and 1957 revolutionised main line operations. They were then followed by the T and Y classes in 1955 and 1963 which displaced steam from the branch lines and yards. Apart from the F class, Clyde Engineering has had a monopoly on Victorian diesel-electric locos. as the Australian licensee of General Motors EMD engines and traction motors, fitting them into locally designed bodies. By the 1980s the first generation locomotives were approaching the end of their lives, with the electric locomotives withdrawn by 1988, and the modern N and G classes allowing the withdrawal of lower power T and Y classes.

Today, the former Victorian Railways locomotive fleet has been split into two, with the N class utilised by V/Line on passenger services, with the remainder with Pacific National or other private operators in freight use. No new passenger locomotives have been built since the 1980s, with Diesel Multiple Units being acquired instead. Freight operations have seen the re-powering of the G and X classes, as well as the restoration to service of stored locomotives, now up to 50 years old.

=== Passenger ===
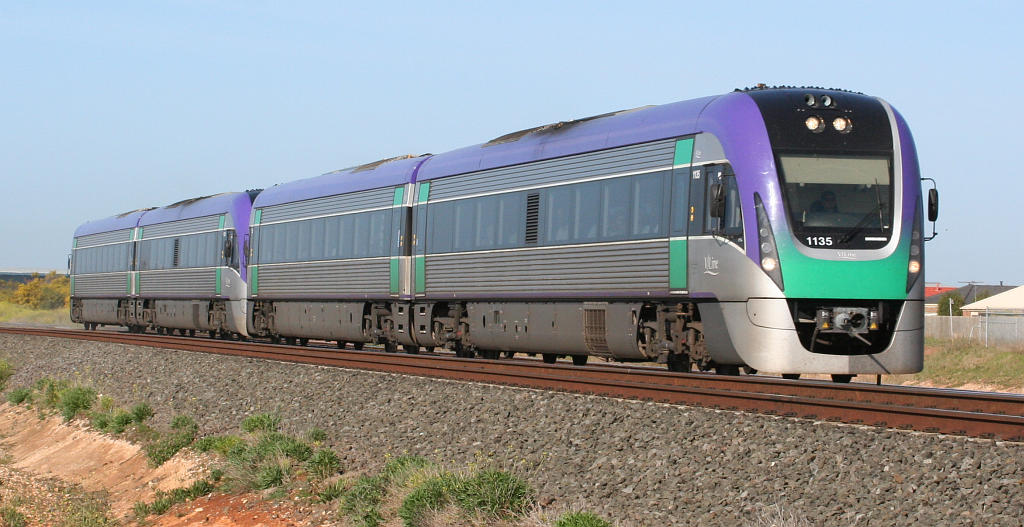
Modern V/Line VLocity diesel train purchased for the Regional Fast Rail project

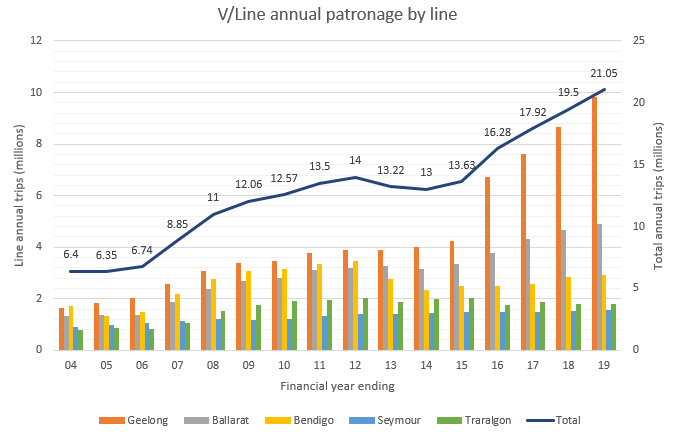
V/Line rail passenger totals by line from 2004 to 2018.

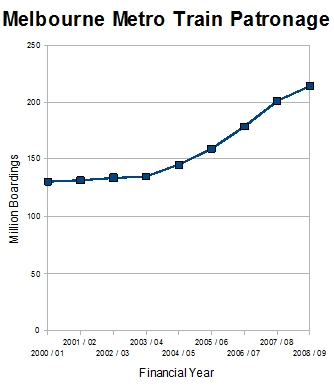
Metropolitan train patronage 2000–2009 based on official state government figures.

Early passenger services were operated with 4 and 6 wheeled "dogbox" passenger carriage with small compartments and no side corridors. Later years saw the provision of side corridors to provide access down the train, and onboard toilets. Sleeping carriages was first introduced in 1887, and dining cars from 1908.

Larger bogie rollingstock started to appear from the turn of the 20th century, with the E type carriage stock introduced on The Overland, and smaller W type carriage stock on intrastate trains. The first air conditioned carriage was introduced in 1935, when one of the E type carriages was fitted. All steel carriages came to the Victorian Railways in 1927, with the construction of the "Avoca" and "Hopkins" dining cars, followed by the S type carriage stock for the new Spirit of Progress in 1937.

On the Melbourne suburban network, Electric Multiple Units were introduced speeding up services. Experiments were also made with various diesel and petrol railcars for use smaller branch lines, with the DERM being the most successful, remaining in service from 1928 to 1991. A fleet of Walker railcars was also introduced in the 1950s, along with Z type saloon carriage stock for both intra and interstate trains.

By the 1980s, country passenger services were run down, and older wooden rolling stock was now approaching their use by date. As a result, the N type carriages were introduced from 1981, followed by the converted H type stock from 1984. Since then, diesel multiple units have become the norm for new purchases, with the Sprinter introduced in 1992, and the VLocity from 2005.

=== Freight ===
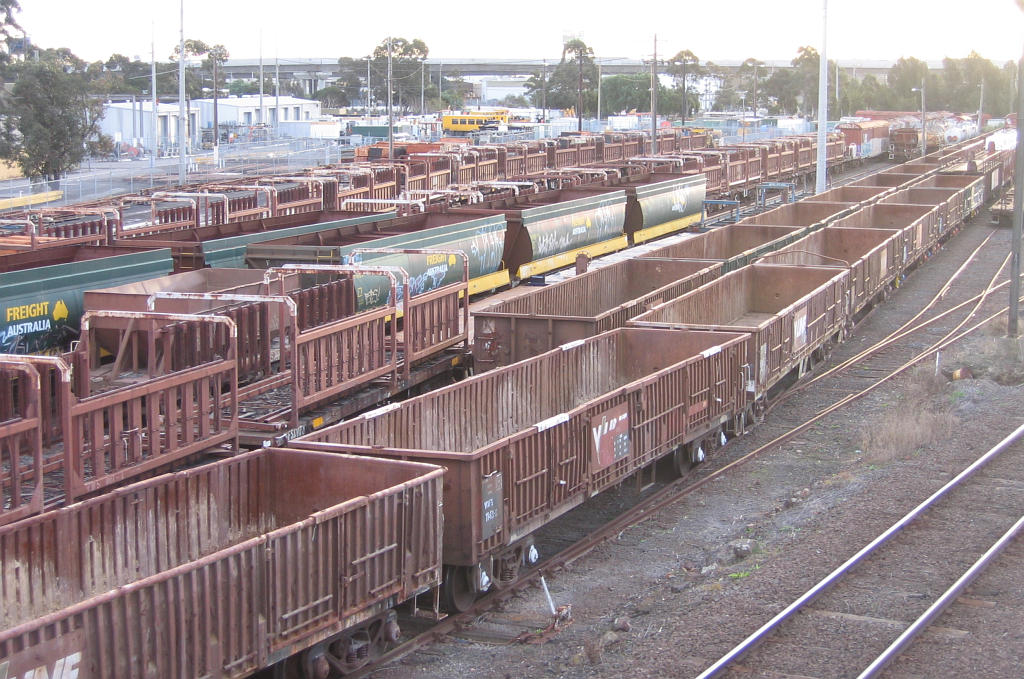
Various Victorian bogie wagons

Early wagons were of all-wood construction, followed by wooden bodies on steel underframes, then all-steel wagons. They were built on four-wheeled underframes, but in 1871 bogie vehicles began to appear. Groups of wagons of the same design are classed together by a multiple character alphabetical code, initially in a system restricted to Victoria only, but from 1979, the Railways of Australia four letter coding was introduced. Under this system, the first letter represents the owner of the wagon, the second represents the general type of wagon, the third separates different classes of the same general type, and the fourth letter indicates the maximum running speed.

The last four-wheeled open wagons were built in 1958, but were not scrapped in large numbers until the 1980s, when new bogie wagons replaced them. In 1987, the bogie wagon fleet numbered about 5000: approximately 700 grain hoppers, 800 container flats, 1000 louvred vans, 700 open wagons, 400 tank cars, and 300 flat wagons. Today, the broad gauge intrastate fleet numbers about 2600, with large numbers of louvred vans, open and flat wagons, and tank cars stored or scrapped due to the transfer of traffic to road following years of apathy by Governments.

== Operations ==
=== Commodities ===
Commodity	Percentage of freight traffic (see notes)		
Year	1987 (Note: Percentages for 1987 are calculated by freight tonnes consigned to the V/Line network.)	2018 (Note: Percentages for 2018 are calculated by Gross Tonne Kilometres (GTKs) of freight train traffic on the V/Line network, which excludes interstate operations.)	2018 (Note: Percentages for 2018 are calculated by Gross Tonne Kilometres (GTKs) of freight train traffic on the V/Line network, which excludes interstate operations.)
Bulk grain	31.4%	50.8%	51.9%
Containers	10.6%	19.6%	44.3%
Freight forwarders	9.5%	N/A	3.8%
Mining & quarry products	7.9%	14.7%	3.8%
Cement	6.8%	4.9%	3.8%
Iron & steel	6.3%	N/A	3.8%
Petroleum	4.4%	3.2%	0%
Percentages are indicative only and not directly comparable.

Victoria does not have a dominant mining base as in other states, and has traditionally been more dependent on agriculture for rail freight traffic. In the early 20th century, rail was a "common carrier" and was required to carry almost any freight offered. After World War I, road competition increased, until in 1933, legislation was passed to regulate road vehicles competing with rail on specific routes. From 1974 to the 1980s, intrastate road freight was deregulated, and the Victorian Railways' "common carrier" obligations were removed, resulting in the loss to road of much non-bulk freight. In 1987, 10.51 million tonnes of freight was carried by rail, with bulk grain being the main commodity, consisting of 31.4% of traffic.

By 2016, the only remaining general containerised freight services on the intrastate network were operated to Warrnambool, to Dooen, to Merbein and Donald, and to Tocumwal, all originating from the Port of Melbourne and running between three and five times per week. Other intrastate rail traffic was primarily specialised bulk freight, including mineral sands between Hopetoun, Hamilton and Portland in the state's west; export rice between Deniliqiun and the Port of Melbourne; paper between Australian Paper Mills in Maryvale and Melbourne; and steel to BlueScope steel plants at Hastings and Somerton.

=== Companies ===
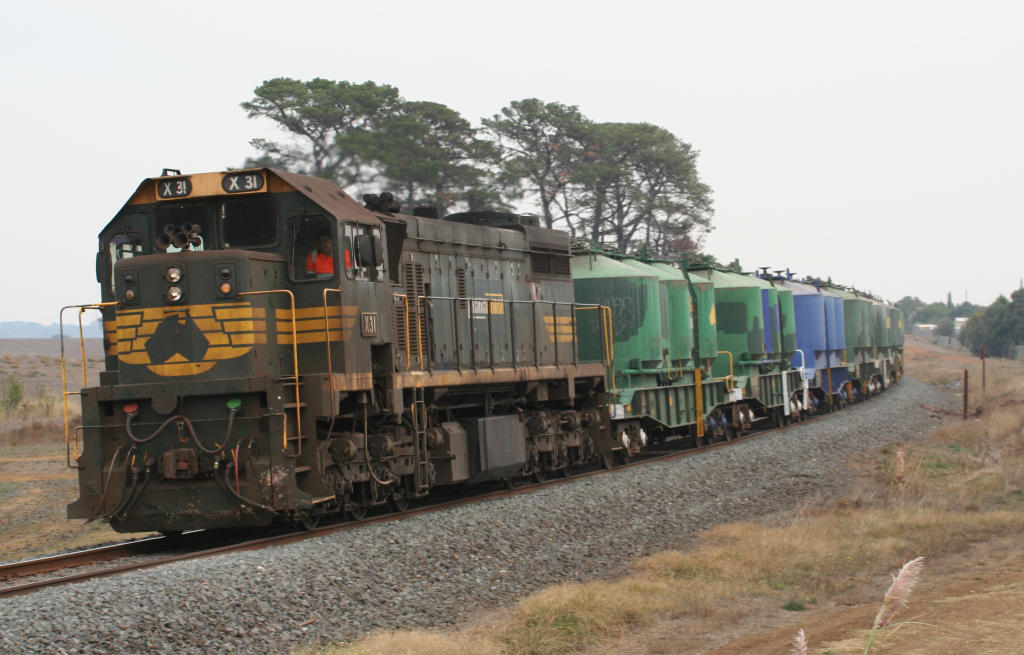
Pacific National operated freight train

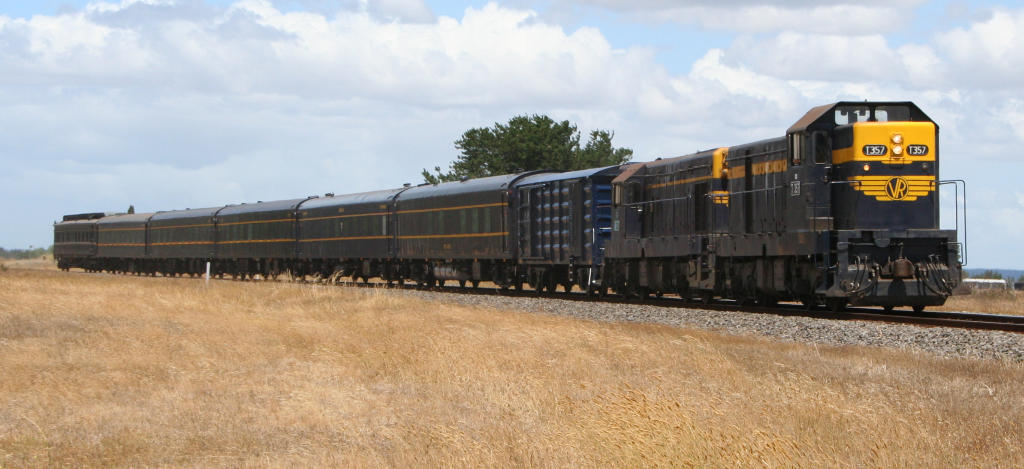
Heritage train in the Victorian Railways livery

The first railways in Victoria were operated by private companies, but when the companies failed or defaulted, the state government took over. The government agency was known as the "Department of Railways" from 1856 to 1883, when the Victorian Railways Commissioners Act established the Victorian Railways. In 1973 the Railways (Amendment) Act 1972 passed management of the Railways from the Victorian Railways Commissioners to a Victorian Railways Board. In 1976 the railways were rebranded as VicRail.

In 1983, VicRail was split into the State Transport Authority for country rail and road, passenger and freight services under the V/Line brand; and the Metropolitan Transit Authority, taking over suburban passenger operations. In 1989, these authorities were merged into the Public Transport Corporation and suburban services were rebranded as "The Met".

In 1993, long-distance country rail services previously run by the government-owned operator V/Line were offered to private operators. Several rail services were replaced by road coach services. The first private operator in Victoria was the West Coast Railway, which successfully tendered to operate the railway to Warrnambool. In 1993 Professor Fred Hilmer presented the findings of the National Competition Policy Review Committee, known as the Hilmer Report, leading to the introduction of a National Competition Policy in 1995. One effect was to allow new rail freight operators to establish operations in Victoria. Specialised Container Transport began operating trains to Perth in 1995 and Great Northern Rail Services started intrastate operations.

Privatisation of the Public Transport Corporation commenced under the Kennett Government of the 1990s. V/Line was split into separate freight and passenger divisions, and "The Met" was divided into Hillside Trains and Bayside Trains. These separate bodies were all sold separately in 1999: V/Line Freight and the rural intrastate network to Freight Victoria, a consortium led by American operator RailAmerica; Hillside Trains and track lease to Connex Melbourne; and V/Line Passenger and Bayside Trains, renamed M>Train and with its track lease, to British operator National Express.

On 16 December 2002, National Express announced their intention to withdraw financial support from their rail operations in Victoria, including V/Line Passenger and M>Train. The government temporarily resumed control of its systems through receivers and decided to retender the metropolitan rail network to a single operator; Connex won the contract and took control of the entire metropolitan system in February 2004. Meanwhile, in July 2003, the government announced its intention to retain V/Line Passenger in public ownership, and set up the state-owned V/Line Corporation, which bought the operator out of receivership on 1 October 2003.

16 August 2004 saw the Freight Victoria business and rural track lease was purchased by Pacific National, but by November 2006 they entered into an agreement to sell the track lease back to the Victorian Government for $133.8 million, with the sale completed on 7 May 2007 and V/Line becoming track manager.

In December 2007, Pacific National announced plans to sell or close its grain transport and Portlink rural container business operations in Victoria. The decision has been criticised as it will force grain growers to use higher cost road transport to transport the annual grain harvest from rural silos to the ports. The decision has seen many commentators accuse Pacific National of only acquiring the operations of Freight Australia in 2004 for the purposes of asset stripping and eliminating competition in rail freight. In 2008 El Zorro took over the Warrnambool – Melbourne container service from Pacific National, and moved into broad gauge grain services, while Aurizon has taken over the Melbourne – Horsham container service.

== Lines ==
Victoria's first railway was a 4 km Victorian broad gauge line between the Melbourne (or City) Terminus (on the site of modern-day Flinders Street station) and Sandridge (now Port Melbourne), constructed by the Melbourne and Hobson's Bay Railway Company and opened in September 1854. Today, Melbourne's suburban railway network consists of 16 electrified lines, the central City Loop subway, and 218 stations, with a total length of 377.2 km of the electrified lines, operated by Metro Trains Melbourne under franchise to the Government of Victoria.

In Gippsland, the Orbost line was constructed as an extension of suburban lines between 1877 and 1888 to Bairnsdale, and extended eastwards to Orbost in 1916. The line between Dandenong and Traralgon was electrified in 1954, but electrification was cut back progressively to Pakenham between 1987 and 2001. V/Line passenger trains now run as far as Bairnsdale.

The South Gippsland line was opened from Dandenong to Cranbourne, Leongatha and Port Albert between 1888 and 1892. A number of branch lines were also built, with almost all closed in stages between the early 1970s and 1994, except for part has since been electrified and re-opened as part of the suburban network, and between Nyora and Leongatha where the South Gippsland Tourist Railway operated heritage services, until they folded in 2016. The entirety of the line is now closed beyond Cranbourne, with the section beyond Nyora fully dismantled

The North East line originated from a suburban line to Essendon in 1860, being extended to Wodonga by 1873, connecting with the New South Wales Government Railways at Albury at a break-of-gauge in 1883. A standard gauge track was completed parallel with the broad gauge track from Albury to Melbourne in 1962. The broad gauge track has been converted to standard gauge between Seymour and Albury.

The Shepparton line was built from Mangalore to Shepparton in 1880 and extended to the New South Wales Government Railways at Tocumwal at a break-of-gauge in 1908. V/Line passenger services run as far as Shepparton.

The Bendigo line was completed in 1862, with extensions were opened to Echuca in 1864, and Swan Hill in 1890, followed by a number of lines throughout the north-west corner of the state. Only these lines continue to see V/Line services, with other lines in the region only seeing freight traffic.

The Main Western line had its beginnings in the first railway line from Melbourne to Ballarat, the Geelong-Ballarat line that opened in 1862. The line extended from Ballarat to Ararat between 1874 and 1875, but it was not until 1889 that the direct line between Melbourne and Ballarat was opened, built from both ends in stages until they met at Ballan. Further branch lines followed to Portland and other western towns. The line formed the first intercolonial railway line in Australia, when it was extended to the South Australian Railways at Serviceton in 1887. Up until the 1990s, the Ballarat line was on the main route between Melbourne and Adelaide, as well as The Overland services to Adelaide, until the One Nation Program rerouted the main interstate line via Geelong and Maroona as standard gauge.

The Warrnambool line was started when the Geelong and Melbourne Railway Company opened the Geelong line to Newport in 1857, being extended to Spencer Street station in 1859. The line was taken over by Victorian Railways in 1860 and a line was opened from Geelong to Ballarat in 1862, and later extended south-east from 1876, reaching Warrnambool and Port Fairy in 1890. Branch lines also existed to Queenscliff, Beech Forest, and a number of other towns.

== Private railways ==
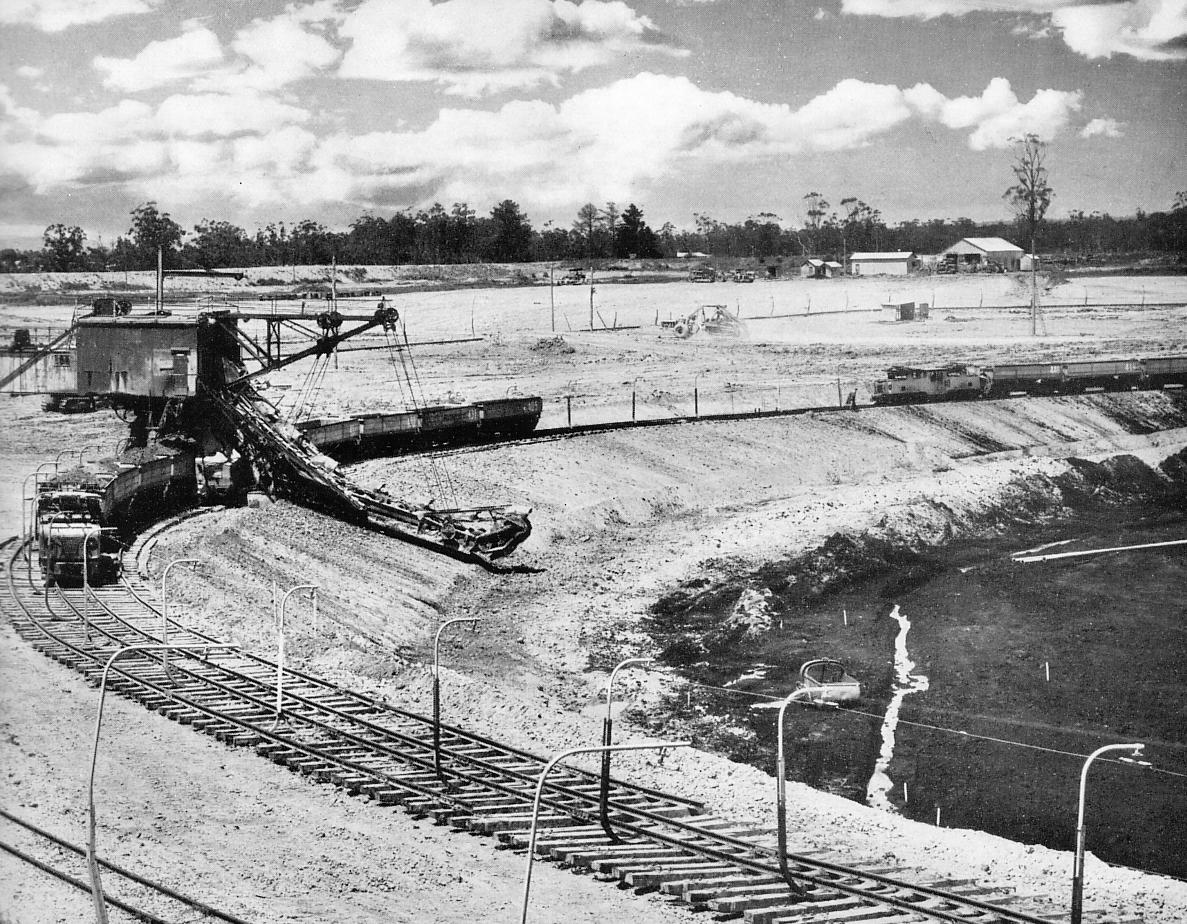
Trains on the Yallourn 900mm Railway

A small number of private railways have also existed at various times. Some, such as the Geelong and Melbourne Railway Company, and the Melbourne and Suburban Railway Company, Melbourne and Hobson's Bay Railway Company, Melbourne and Essendon Railway Company and St Kilda and Brighton Railway Company were acquired by the Victorian Railways and made part of the core state network in 1860 and 1878 respectively. Other country branch lines were also built by private companies: namely the Kerang-Koondrook Tramway and the Deniliquin and Moama Railway, both not being acquired until the 20th century.

In addition to the main Victorian rail network of the Victorian Railways and successors, a number of narrow gauge private railways and tramways have also existed for logging and mining purposes. These included the Yallourn 900mm Railway in the Latrobe Valley open cut coal mines, the Fyansford Cement Works Railway near Geelong, the Tyers Valley Tramway at Mount Baw Baw, and the Powelltown Tramway from Yarra Junction.

Most logging tramways operated in the Otway Ranges, Gippsland, and the inner east of the Great Dividing Range; primarily between the 1850s and the 1950s, with only one surviving into the 1960s. They were primarily of 3 ft 6 in (1,067 mm) or 3 ft (914 mm) gauge, with 2 ft (610 mm), 2 ft 6 in (762 mm), 4 ft (1,219 mm), 5 ft 3 in (1,600 mm) and variants also used.

Melbourne and Hobson's Bay Railway Company (1853–1865)
Geelong and Melbourne Railway Company (1853–1860)
Melbourne, Mount Alexander and Murray River Railway Company (1853–1856)
Victorian Railways (1856–1983)
Melbourne and Suburban Railway Company (1857–1862)
MRC
St Kilda and Brighton Railway Company (1857–1862)
Melbourne and Essendon Railway Company (1859–1867)
Melbourne Railway Company (1862–1865)
Melbourne and Hobson's Bay United Railway Company (1865–1878)
Deniliquin and Moama Railway Company (1874–1923)
← Only train (14 November 1888)
Rosstown Railway (1875–1904~1916)
?? (Grampians railway line) (1882–1905)
VR
Altona Beach Estates (1887–1923)
Shires of Swan Hill/Kerang (Kerang–Koondrook Tramway) (1889–1952)
Yarrawonga Shire Council (Katamatite Tramway) (1890–1892)
│
1853
│
1863
│
1873
│
1883
│
1893
│
1903
│
1913
│
1923
│
1933
│
1943
│
1953
First 100 years
No operations · Operations · Operations by another company

== Railway preservation ==
Organised railway preservation commenced in Victoria with the formation of the Puffing Billy Preservation Society in 1955, and operating under the Emerald Tourist Railway Board from 1977. Formed to operate the narrow gauge 2 ft 6 in (760 mm) gauge railway in the Dandenong Ranges near Melbourne, the group continues to operate the railway today.

The demise of the last of the steam locomotives in Victoria commenced in the 1960s, with the Australian Railway Historical Society and Association of Railway Enthusiasts working with the Victorian Railways to have a number of locomotives preserved for the future. In 1962 the Australian Railway Historical Society Museum was established at Williamstown North to house static exhibits, and Steamrail Victoria was formed in 1965 to assist in the restoration of locomotives and carriages for use on special trains.

By the 1980s, a number of heritage railways had been established in Victoria on closed branch lines. These railways serve both as tourist attractions, and to preserve the railway past. The work of railway preservation groups has since expanded to retired railway carriages, electric multiple units, rail motors, and diesel locomotives. In 2006, heritage railways carried 542,000 patrons over 161 km of track; with 28 operational steam locomotives, 47 diesels, 14 railmotors, and 192 carriages.

Heritage Railways and Operators include:

- 707 Operations, Newport
- Puffing Billy Railway, Belgrave
- Bellarine Railway, Queenscliff
- Daylesford Spa Country Railway, Daylesford
- Victorian Goldfields Railway, Maldon
- Mornington Railway, Mornington
- Seymour Railway Heritage Centre, Seymour
- Steamrail Victoria, Newport
- Walhalla Goldfields Railway, Walhalla
- Yarra Valley Railway, Healesville
- South Gippsland Railway, Leongatha
- Tramway Museum Society of Victoria, Bylands

== Rail trails ==
Victoria's tourist railways
Bellarine Railway
Daylesford Spa Country Railway
Mornington Railway
Puffing Billy Railway
Victorian Goldfields Railway
Walhalla Goldfields Railway
Yarra Valley Tourist Railway
Former tourist railways
South Gippsland Railway

A number of former rail lines in Melbourne and regional Victoria have been converted into rail trails, for walking, cycling and horse riding. These make excellent tracks for beginners as the lines were originally designed to avoid steep gradients. Most lines are still in public ownership. Some sections of the track are specially leased to neighbouring farmers for stock grazing. This reduces maintenance costs.

Trails around Melbourne include:

- Inner Circle (Rushall to Royal Park)
- Outer Circle (Fairfield to Hughesdale)
- Rosstown (Hughesdale to Elsternwick)
- Hawthorn to Kew
- Red Hill (Merricks to Red Hill)
- Lilydale to Warburton Rail Trail

Trails around Victoria include:

- East Gippsland (Bairnsdale to Newmeralla)
- The Beechy (Colac to Beech Forest)
- Crater to Coast (Camperdown to Timboon)
- Ballarat–Skipton
- Murray to the Mountains (Wangaratta to Beechworth and Bright)
- Great Victorian Rail Trail (Tallarook to Alexandra and Mansfield)
- Great Southern Rail Trail (Leongatha–Foster, future extension to Yarram)
- Bass Coast Rail Trail (Anderson–Wonthaggi, future extension to Nyora)
- Port Fairy to Warrnambool Rail Trail

== Legislation, governance and access ==
=== Key statutes ===
The prime rail statute in Victoria is the Transport Integration Act 2010 (No. 6 of 2010). The act establishes the Department of Transport, Planning and Local Infrastructure as the integration agency for Victoria's transport system. The act also establishes and sets the charters of the state agencies charged with providing public transport rail services and managing network access for freight services, namely the Director of Public Transport and V/Line. In addition, the act creates VicTrack which owns the public rail network and associated infrastructure. Another important statute is the Rail Management Act 1996 which confers powers on rail operators and provides for a rail access scheme for the state's rail network. As a result of recent changes to the Transport Integration Act 2010, the responsibilities of the Director of Public Transport are being progressively assumed by the new Public Transport Development Authority, a major initiative of the Bailieu government.

=== Safety ===
==== Regulation ====
The safety of rail operations in Victoria is regulated by the Rail Safety Act 2006 which applies to all commercial passenger and freight operations as well as tourist and heritage railways. The act creates a framework containing safety duties for all rail industry participants and requires rail operators who manage infrastructure and rolling stock to obtain accreditation prior to commencing operations. Accredited rail operators are also required to have a safety management system to guide their operations.

Sanctions applying to the safety scheme established under the Rail Safety Act 2006 are contained in the Transport (Compliance and Miscellaneous) Act 1983. The safety regulator for the rail system in Victoria is the Director, Transport Safety (trading as Transport Safety Victoria) whose office is established under the Transport Integration Act 2010.

==== Investigation ====
Rail operators in Victoria can also be the subject of no-blame investigations conducted by the Chief Investigator, Transport Safety or the Australian Transport Safety Bureau (ATSB). The Chief Investigator is charged by the Transport Integration Act 2010 with conducting investigations into rail safety matters including incidents and trends. ATSB, on the other hand, claims jurisdiction over the same matters where they occur on the Designated Interstate Rail Network.

=== Ticketing and conduct ===
Ticketing requirements for public transport in Victoria are mainly contained in the Transport (Ticketing) Regulations 2006 and the Victorian Fares and Ticketing Manual. Rules about safe and fair conduct on trains and trams in Melbourne are generally contained in the Transport (Compliance and Miscellaneous) Act 1983 and the Transport (Conduct) Regulations 2005.

=== Tourist and heritage railways ===
Tourist and Heritage Railways in Victoria are governed by provisions in the Tourist and Heritage Railways Act 2010 which commenced on 1 October 2011.

== See also ==
- Dandenong railway line triplication
- Narrow gauge lines of the Victorian Railways
- Railway accidents in Victoria
- Railways in Melbourne
- Regional Rail Link
- Victorian broad gauge
- Bradshaw's Guide to Victoria (Australia)
