= Bland Report =

Rail projects review in Victoria, Australia

The 'Bland Report' officially titled Report of the Board of Enquiry into the Victorian Land Transport System - Victoria 1971-72, was a report prepared by Sir Henry Bland (1909–1997) for the Victorian Government in 1972.

The Bland Report recommended major changes to Victorian Railway operations including closure of many of the less profitable branch lines, opening railways to competition from road transport operators, on a market basis, introduction of contract road buses, rationalisation of freight operations and creation of regional freight centres. A substantial reduction in the number of railway employees resulted from these changes. In both its scope and consequences, the Bland Report was similar to the Beeching Review in Britain.

A major outcome of the report was the Railways (Amendment) Act 1972 which passed the management and operation of the railways from the Victorian Railways Commissioners to a Victorian Railways Board made up of up to seven members, with six initially appointed with A.G. Gibbs as the first chairman. The Board was in turn replaced in 1983 when the Transport Act 1983 was passed.

== See also ==
- Ashworth Improvement Plan
- Operation Phoenix
- 1969 Melbourne Transportation Plan
- New Deal
- Victorian Transport Plan
