= Ashworth Improvement Plan =

Melbourne railway improvement plan, 1940-1947

The Ashworth Improvement Plan was a report that recommended a number of improvements to be made to the electrified suburban railways of inner city Melbourne, Australia. It was produced in 1940 by a committee headed by John Marmaduke Ashworth, the Victorian Railways Chief Engineer for Way and Works. In order to meet projected future needs, the report recommended duplication of lines, terminal improvements and underground railway connections.

== Background ==
Melbourne had been a city dominated early on by suburban railways, with the system reaching its peak early in 1891 on the back of a number of speculative lines. In the early twentieth century, Melbourne easily had the best public transport in Australia. In 1907 both trams and trains carried about 62 million passengers per year. Electric operation of the suburban railways began in 1919, and patronage grew by 63.4% over just six years, from 96,797,783 in 1917–18 to 158,194,558 in 1923–24. What was not apparent to the public was that the electrification project had not been accompanied by any other works, cutting costs by putting limitations on growth.

By 1937-38 patronage had grown to 135,329,598 but the pattern of suburban rail travel was changing. People were living further from the inner city, and the average distance travelled by commuters changed from 9.0 kilometres (5.6 mi) in the early 1930s to 10.4 kilometres (6.5 mi) by the end of the decade. The Victorian Railways Commissioners established a committee in 1938 to study the impact of the increase of long distance suburban traffic. It consisted of three officers headed by Ashworth.

At the time the report was commissioned, Melbourne consisted of 173 route miles (278 km) of railways (owned by the Government of Victoria), 140 route miles (225 km) of tramways (vested in the Melbourne and Metropolitan Tramways Board) and 57 route miles (92 km) of bus routes, whilst private individuals or companies operated approximately 350 bus route miles (563 km) over 105 routes.

== The report ==
Proposed 1940 Melbourne Railway Extension Projects

The report was released in 1940. The Commissioners wrote that the report covered works that would provide transport facilities for years to come, but at a cost of several million pounds. The works would need to be spread over several years, not just for funding reasons, but to avoid disruption of existing services.

Recommendations included:

- Additional platforms at the Flinders Street/Princes Bridge station complex, involving tracks on two levels and a connection to an underground City Railway to distribute passengers closer to their places of work.
- Extensive roofing over of Jolimont Yard, permitting rental income to fund the program.
- Track duplication on the single track Glen Waverley line between Heyington and Eastmalvern (since renamed East Malvern).
- Track duplication on the Ashburton line between Camberwell and Ashburton.
- Track duplication on the Hurstbridge line between Alphington and Heidelberg.
- The addition of a new track pair from Flinders Street to South Yarra, including a new Cremorne Bridge over the Yarra River.
- Track quadruplication from Flinders Street to Hawthorn.
- Rebuild Richmond railway station with ten tracks in lieu of six. (Notably, the diagram in the report shows it as one side, four islands and the Up Caulfield Through track without a platform.)
- Construct a line to Doncaster as an extension to the line from Hawthorn to Kew.
- Connection of the Ashburton line to the Glen Waverley line at East Malvern, via the 1895 Outer Circle route.

The report also recommended that there was an urgent need for effective co-ordination of all transport facilities to reduce the anomalies with wasteful competition in some localities.

== Actions ==
Very few of the recommendations were able to be carried out immediately due to the ongoing war effort. Only one of the elements was undertaken during this period - the flyover at Burnley station that permitted down Glen Waverley line trains to cross those headed towards Hawthorn. It was completed in August 1943. In 1944 work began on rebuilding the Cremorne Bridge across the Yarra River at South Yarra, which was completed in 1947 with only four tracks, with the provision for two more to be added later.

The rest of the works were not carried out, but some were revisited later. Much of the track amplification was carried out as part of the 1950s Operation Phoenix and a variant of the City Railway was built as the City Loop that started in 1970 and was completed in 1985.

== See also ==
- Railways in Melbourne
- Operation Phoenix
- 1969 Melbourne Transportation Plan
- Lonie Report
- New Deal
- Regional Fast Rail project
- List of proposed Melbourne rail extensions
- List of Victoria Government Infrastructure Plans, Proposals and Studies
