= William Funnell (public servant) =

Australian public servant (1891–1962)

William Funnell ISO

Secretary of the Department of Labour and National Service
- In office 8 March 1946 – 30 January 1952

Personal details
- Born: 8 June 1891 Goulburn, New South Wales
- Died: 25 October 1962 (aged 71) Castlecrag, Sydney, New South Wales
- Occupation: Public servant

William Funnell ISO (8 June 1891 – 25 October 1962) was a senior Australian public servant, best known for his time as head of the Department of Labour and National Service between 1946 and 1952.

== Life and career ==
Funnell was born 8 June 1891 in Goulburn, New South Wales to parents William Funnell and Jessie Anne Funnell, née Worchurst. He attended South Goulburn Public School before joining the New South Wales Government Railways and Tramways office in 1906 as an apprentice clerk.

In March 1946, Funnell was appointed as Secretary of the Department of Labour and National Service.

Funnell died on 25 October 1962 in Castlecrag, Sydney.

== Awards ==
Funnell was made a companion of the Imperial Service Order in June 1954 in recognition of his public service.

Government offices
Preceded by Roland Wilson	Secretary of the Department of Labour and National Service; 1946 – 1952	Succeeded by Henry Bland
