= Earle Hackett =

Dr Earle Hackett (26 April 1921 – 5 April 2010) was an Irish-born pathologist and haematologist who migrated to Australia, where he held several responsible administrative positions. He is best remembered as a radio broadcaster on medical subjects, particularly on The Body Program for ABC which he wrote and presented from 1971 to 1982. He was the author of a number of books based on those programmes, and several biographies for the Australian Dictionary of Biography.

== History ==
Hackett was born in Cork, Ireland, son of a successful general practitioner. He was the founding chairman of the Irish National Blood Transfusion Service.

He migrated to Adelaide, South Australia in 1958 to take up a position as deputy director of the Institute of Medical and Veterinary Science (IMVS) at the University of Adelaide.

== Broadcasting ==
As a distraction from his administrative duties, he sent some scripts to Dr. Peter Pockley, director of science programs for the ABC, which resulted in five talks on "blood" for the radio science program Insight commencing January 1967. His weekly "The Body Program" running from 1971 to 1982, was well received, with its amalgam of medical information, poetry, wit, irreverence and bawdiness, all delivered with Hackett's friendly cultured voice. Scripts from many of these programs have formed the basis of several books published by the ABC and elsewhere. An mp3 download of his final broadcast is available here Science Show tribute. He had resigned from the IMVS to further his interests in broadcasting and other ventures, including a (failed) private blood bank.

== Other interests ==
He was at various times chairman of the board of the Art Gallery of South Australia, chairman of the Crafts Council of South Australia and president of the College of Pathologists of Australia.

He was appointed to the ABC board in 1973, became deputy chairman in 1974, then acting chairman on 10 November 1975, when Professor Richard Downing died of a heart attack. This was the day before the overthrow of the Whitlam government and Hackett was to prove a staunch defender of the ABC in the face of budget cuts by the succeeding Fraser Coalition government. His stint as acting chairman lasted only six months: he was summarily dismissed and replaced by Sir Henry Bland.

== Personal life ==
Hackett married a nurse, Eileen Carroll, born in Swaziland of Irish parents. They had three children, Jane, Susan and Johnjames. He was survived by his three children, his second wife, Karin Lemercier and a brother, Ronald, in County Cork.

== Bibliography ==
- Insight on Blood; five talks broadcast in the ABC radio program about science, Insight Australian Broadcasting Commission, 1968
- More Insight on Blood Australian Broadcasting Commission, 1968.
- Organ Voluntaries and Other Insights Collins/ABC 1972 ISBN 0-00-217308-5
- Blood or Blood the Paramount Humour Jonathan Cape, London 1973 ISBN 978-0-224-00631-6
- Farts and Fevers: prescriptions from the Body Programme of the ABC Collins/ABC 1984 ISBN 0-00-217308-5
- Lady Bones Collins/ABC 1984 ISBN 0-00-217307-7
- All Gustos Great and Small Collins/ABC 1985 ISBN 0-00-217499-5
- Devils, Drugs and Doctors: A Wellcome History of Medicine, Australia 1986–87 National Gallery of Australia, ISBN 0-642-09877-8
- The doctor's liberty (alternative title Utopian medicine – 1975 Stirling lecture to University of Adelaide) held by National Library of Australia Bib. ID 266029
- de Crespigny, Philip Champion (1850–1927) and de Crespigny, Sir Constantine Trent Champion (1882–1952), (almost identical) entries in the Australian Dictionary of Biography
- Extracts from The Body Program (audio) published by National Library of Australia details and availability
