= Operation Phoenix (railway) =

Operation Phoenix logo

Operation Phoenix was a post-World War II rehabilitation program carried out by the Victorian Railways (VR) in Australia. The program commenced in 1950 and was originally planned to take 10 years and cost £80 million. Operation Phoenix was named after the bird from Egyptian mythology.

== Background ==
During the 1930s and 1940s, the Victorian Railways had deteriorated significantly due to years of economic depression, the demands of the war effort, and material shortages, leading to a general decline. It was anticipated that a railway the size of VR should have been constructing 25 locomotives, 30 to 40 carriages, and 500 wagons annually, in addition to relaying 60 miles of track. However, in reality, VR was only able to produce an average of 4 locomotives and 200 wagons per year, and any progress made was offset by long-overdue scrappings.

When World War II erupted, the VR had little opportunity for reconstruction, as resources were redirected towards the war effort. Consequently, only patch-up work and essential maintenance could be undertaken. Additionally, passenger travel was constrained by government restrictions and further curtailed due to fuel shortages, resulting in longer train journeys and the removal of buffet carriages. However, despite these challenges, in 1948-49, country passenger business witnessed a 76 percent increase compared to the levels of 1938–39, which were considered the peak pre-war years. Suburban traffic also saw a notable uptick of 22 percent. Furthermore, goods traffic surged by 53 percent, with more goods being handled than during any of the war years.

After the end of the war, rebuilding work began in a small way, with new steel, air-conditioned carriages built, as well as new sleeping-cars for The Overland. However, the growth in patronage was due to a lack of alternate transport, with wartime petrol rationing still in force. Passengers were unimpressed with the service provided, and were looking for someone to blame. In 1949 a review of the Victorian Railways was commissioned by transport minister Kent Hughes, and was carried out by British Railways Chief Executive John Elliot. The report found much to admire in the management and staff, but criticised the run-down locomotives, rolling stock, and track and predicted a "final breakdown of rail transport" in ten years if nothing was done. The ideas of the report were not new, the Victorian Railways had been making plans for modernisation of their operations, but did not have the money or political will to implement them.

== Works ==
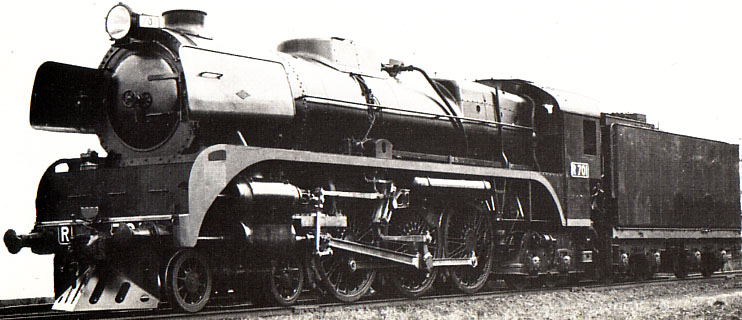
R class steam locomotive

Operation Phoenix was conceived to address these issues, and it took 18 months of planning before it was publicly released. As a whole the program would cost £83 million, with £40 million to be spent on rolling stock, including:

- 350 steam and diesel locomotives
- 30 railcars
- 290 steel passenger cars
- 280 suburban passenger carriages
- 9000 goods wagons
- 300 goods vans

Capital works took up the other £43 million, and were planned to cover:

- An underground railway between a new Richmond station and North Melbourne via the north of the Melbourne CBD (not realised until the City Loop of the 1980s)
- track modernisation, rebuilding, regrading and duplication of existing lines
- replacement of timber bridges to permit heavier trains
- modernisation of locomotives depots and workshops
- reconstruction and expending Melbourne Yard and associated goods sheds

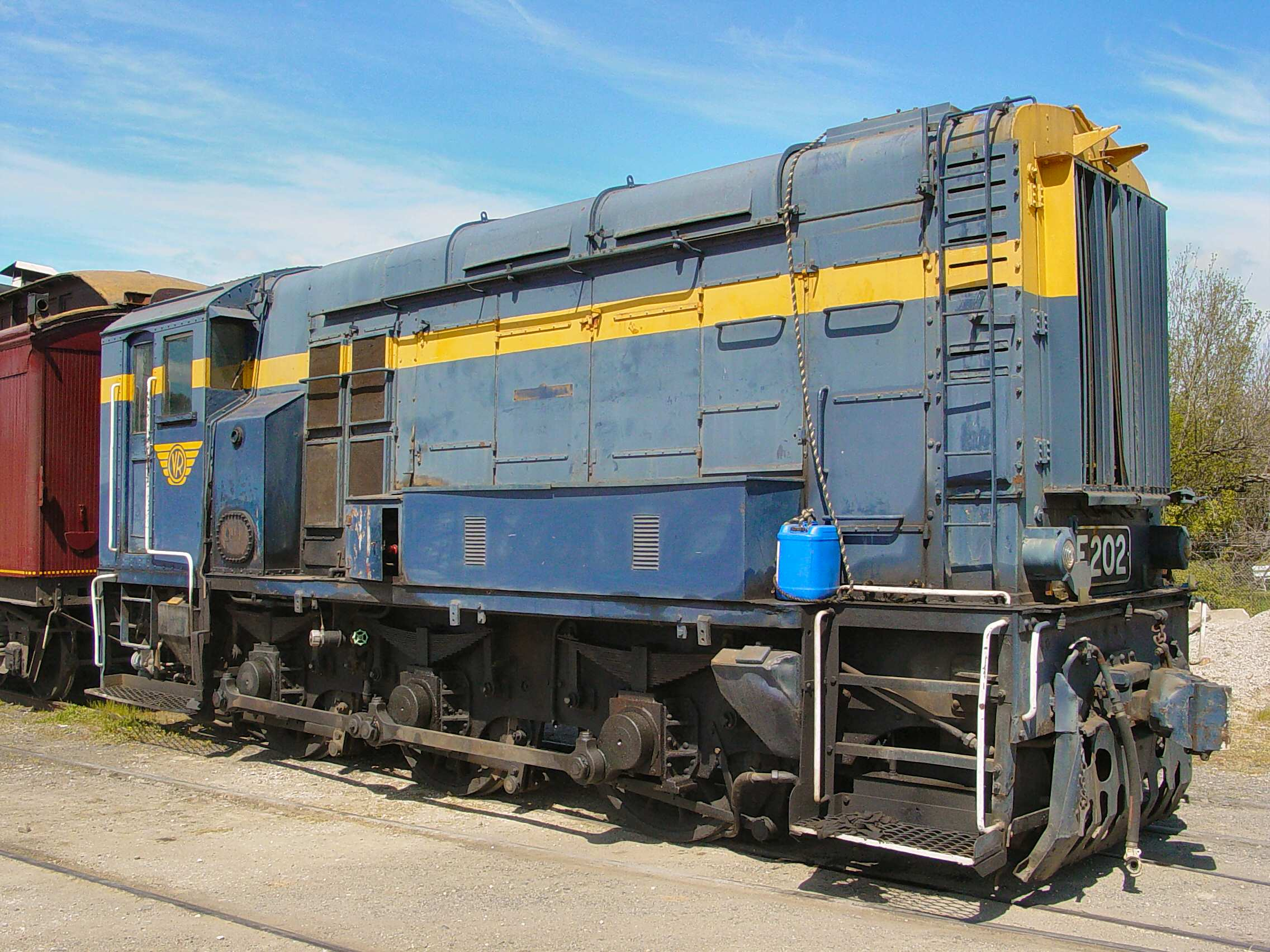
F class diesel shunting locomotive

Initial projects included:

- 100 steam locomotives
- 17 diesel electric locomotives
- 10 diesel electric shunting locomotives
- 30 self-propelled railcars
- 1000 goods wagons
- Electrification, regrading and duplication of the main Gippsland line from Dandenong to Traralgon, to cope with demand for Morwell brown coal and to reduce the dependence on New South Wales coal.
- importation of electric locos
- new substations on the suburban railway lines

To ensure the earliest possible delivery, the construction of the steam locomotives, railcars, and half of the wagons was contracted to British firms, with 18 of the railcars had already been completed by 1950. The major components for the mainline diesel electric locomotives were to be imported from the United States, dependent on the allocation of foreign exchange funds from the federal government.

The remainder of the new rolling stock was constructed by the VR's own workshops, including 20 of the "N class" steam engines, 14 new air-conditioned passenger cars, and 2 new suburban trains.

== Funding difficulties ==
After the 1951-52 financial year, the Victorian Railways were almost £6 million in deficit. Freight rates and passenger fares were increased, but the VR still did not expect to make ends meet. The program of works for 1952-53 was intended to be £12.5 million, and was intended to cover the duplication of the Alamein line between Camberwell and Ashburton, track amplification between Flinders Street and South Yarra, a new Richmond station, importation of 1500 precut houses from England for railway staff, and the purchase of equipment for the use of pulverised brown coal in steam locomotives.

However loans became difficult to negotiate due to money market issues, and so the budget for Operation Phoenix was cut back to £6.8 million. Capital works were slowed, with the loss of employment for many men, and hundreds of thousands of pounds of material were held in storage. Works on the Gippsland electrification was to be completed to Warragul station by 1953, but due to the funding cuts the time line was revised to 1954. 500 of the precut houses were cancelled, the Victorian contribution to joint carriage stock for use on The Overland was cut to 6 sitting cars, and work at Newport Workshops building locomotives, carriages and livestock trucks was suspended. Outside rolling stock contractors were also told to slow down, and to defer claims for progress payments until the 1953-54 financial year.

By June 1952 the rolling stock situation was:

- All 50 of the N class steam locomotive order in service
- 64 of the 70 strong R class steam locomotive order in service
- 60 J class steam locomotives on order
- 10 F class diesel shunting locomotives delivered
- 26 B class main line diesels on order
- 25 L class electrics on order
- All 30 of the Walker railcars in service
- DERM fleet refurbished
- 137 goods wagons built by the VR workshops
- 1825 open wagons built by outside contractors

By the end of that year five of the B class diesels and five more R classes were in service.

== Outcomes ==
By 1953 the new mainline diesels were running 3,000 miles (4,800 km) a week, four times as far as the best steam locomotives. An hour had been cut from long-distance passenger trains to Adelaide, Bairnsdale, Warrnambool, Mildura, and others were also sped up with the delivery of further locomotives. Electrification of the Gippsland line was completed to Warragul in 1954 and to Traralgon in 1956 at a total cost of £6.3 million, but electrification did not spread to the other country railways as originally intended by Operation Phoenix, as the new diesel locomotives were more cost effective than the electrics. Dieselisation of the Victorian Railways continued, with the T class branchline locomotives delivered from 1955. Operation Phoenix was also the peak of capital spending on the Victorian railways, the expenditure during 1950-51 was not exceeded until 1984–85.

== See also ==
- Rail transport in Victoria
- Ashworth Improvement Plan
- 1969 Melbourne Transportation Plan
- Lonie Report
- Bland Report
- New Deal
- Regional Fast Rail project
