= Henry Bland (public servant) =

Australian public servant

Sir Henry Bland
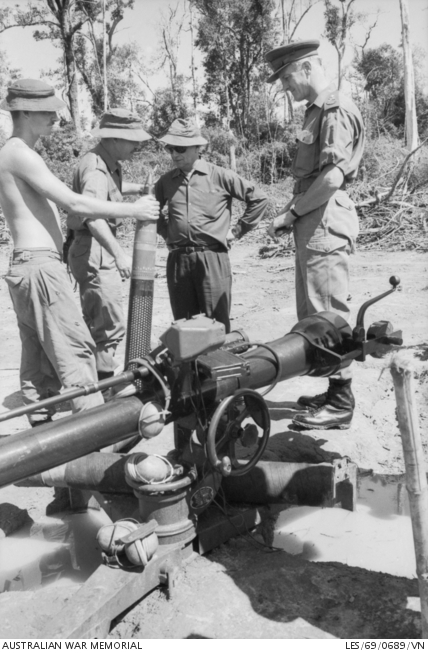
- Sir Henry Bland (3rd from left) is shown a 106mm recoilless rifle at Fire Support Base Diggers' Rest, October 1969

Secretary of the Department of Defence
- In office 1 May 1968 – 1970
- Preceded by: Sir Ted Hicks
- Succeeded by: Sir Arthur Tange

Secretary of the Department of Labour and National Service
- In office 1952–1968
- Preceded by: William Funnell
- Succeeded by: Hal Cook

Personal details
- Born: 28 December 1909 Randwick, New South Wales
- Died: 8 November 1997 (aged 87)
- Spouse(s): Rosamund Nickal (m. 1933–97; his death)
- Parent: Francis Bland
- Education: University of Sydney, LLB (Hons)
- Occupation: Public servant

Sir Henry Armand Bland (28 December 1909 – 8 November 1997) was a senior Australian public servant. He was Secretary of the Department of Defence from 1968 to 1970.

== Life and career ==
Bland was born in Randwick, Sydney on 28 December 1909, the son of Francis Bland. Bland's mother died from septicaemia soon after he was born. In 1925 and 1926, Bland attended Sydney Boys High School.

He studied law at the University of Sydney, graduating with honours, and was admitted as a solicitor of the NSW Supreme Court in 1935. In 1940 and 1941, he was official secretary to the NSW Agent-General in London, and acted as Agent-General himself for some months. On return to Australia he advised the NSW and Commonwealth governments on civil defence.

Bland commenced his Australian Public Service career in 1942, as Principal Adviser to the Director-General of Manpower. In 1946 he was appointed Assistant Director of Employment in the Department of Labour and National Service. Between 1952 and 1967, Bland was Secretary of the Department of Labour and National Service. In the role, he was the main architect of the Commonwealth Employment Service.

Bland was appointed Secretary of the Department of Defence in 1968, but he stayed in the role just two-years, retiring in 1970. During his short time as head of the department, Bland initiated a broad and intense program of administrative reform, including a "rolling" five year defence program that intended to make allowances for Australian defence needs over a five-year period, expecting to shorten the waiting time for hardware by having service departments make submissions for their needs earlier than in the past.

In 1971-2, he undertook a review of land transport in Victoria for the state government, which resulted in the Bland Report recommending closure of many Victorian Railways branch lines and passenger services.

In July 1976 Bland was appointed Chairman of the ABC, a position in which Dr. Earle Hackett had been acting since the death of Prof Richard Downing in November 1975. He resigned after only five months, following clashes with both staff (who resented his appointment as what they called "Malcolm Fraser's hatchet man") and the Fraser government itself, which backed down on its intention to remove the position of Staff Commissioner on the ABC Board. The position was held by Marius Webb, who had been at loggerheads with Bland from the start.

== Awards ==
Bland was honoured as a Knight Bachelor in 1965.

Government offices
Preceded by William Funnell	Secretary of the Department of Labour and National Service; 1952–1968	Succeeded by Hal Cook
Preceded by Sir Ted Hicks	Secretary of the Department of Defence; 1968–1970	Succeeded by Sir Arthur Tange
Media offices
Preceded by Richard Downing	Chairman of the Australian Broadcasting Commission; 1976	Succeeded by John D Norgard
