= Melbourne tram route 69 =

Tram route in Melbourne, Australia

Route 69
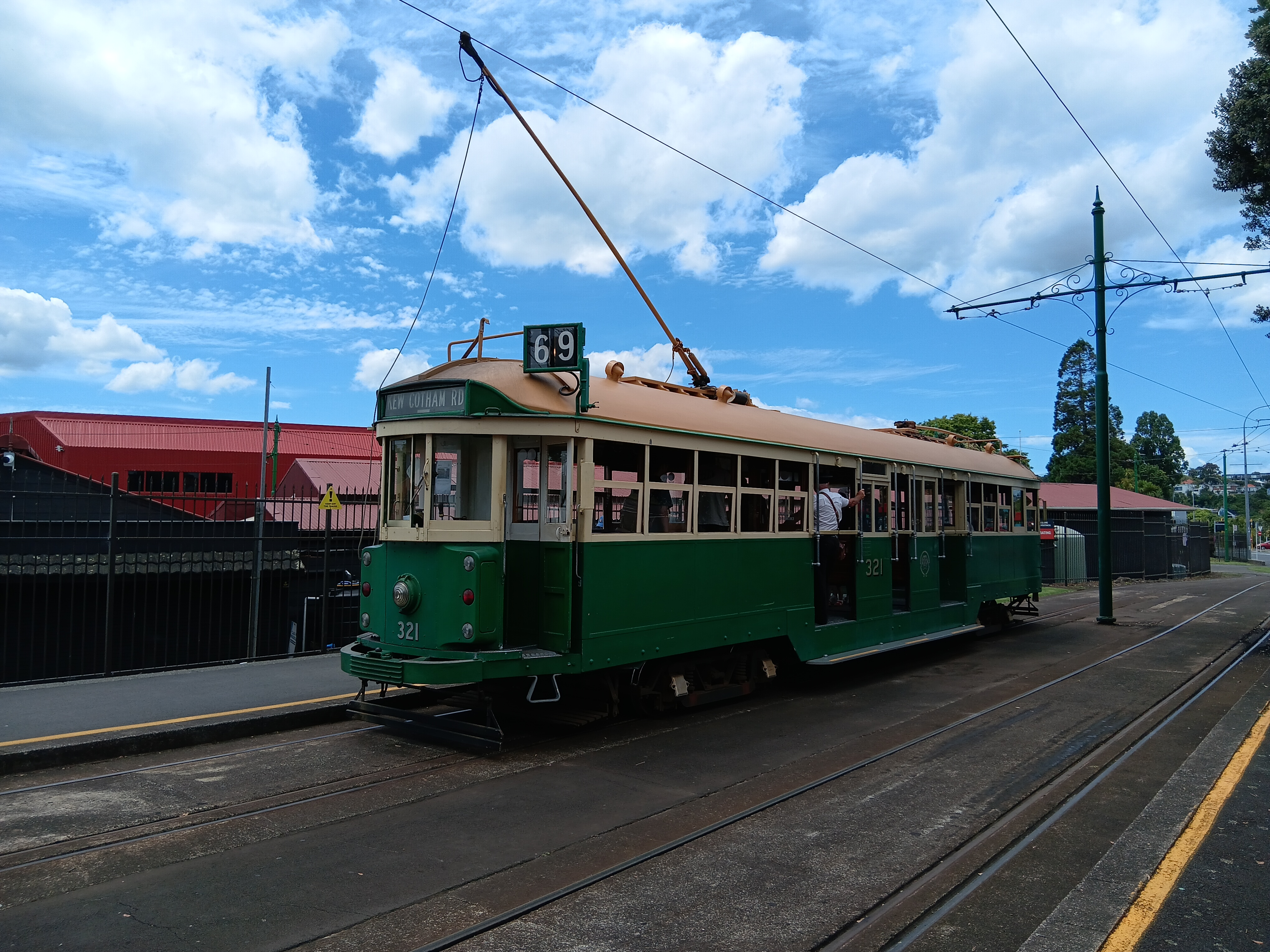
- A preserved W2 Class displaying a Route 69 destination

Overview
- System: Melbourne
- Operator: Yarra Trams
- Depot: Malvern
- Vehicle: Z class B class D1 class
- Began service: 24 June 1934
- Ended service: 15 October 2004

Route
- Start: St Kilda
- Via: The Esplanade; Balaclava Road; Glenferrie Road
- End: Kew

Melbourne tram route 69 was operated by Yarra Trams on the Melbourne tram network from Kew to St Kilda The route was operated out of Malvern Depot with Z, B and D class trams. It ceased operating on 15 October 2004 as the route was merged to form an extended Route 16

== History ==
Route 69 was opened in stages between 1910 and 1913 and was originally operated by the Prahran and Malvern Tramways Trust. During the PMTT era, Route 69 was known as the Route 12. It ran from Cotham Road to St Kilda Road via Kooyong Station.

The PMTT was dissolved in 1920, with its assets, including the Route 69 passing into operations of the Melbourne & Metropolitan Tramways Board.

The Route 69 number was not adopted until 1934, this was because previous models of trams did not feature number boards. The Route 69 number was officially adopted on 24 June 1934.

Route 69 would remain largely unchanged after the beginning of route numbers, seeing only infrastructure improvements and rolling stock upgrades. As part of the privatisation and splitting of Melbournes tram network in 1997, Route 69 passed into the ownership of M-Tram.

On 11 December 2000, all Route 69 services on weekdays were abolished with the route being merged with the Route 16. The Route 69 however remained separate on weekends only.

M-Tram was merged with the operator of the other half of tram network, Yarra Trams in April 2004, with all M-Tram routes, including the Route 69 passing into the ownership of Yarra Trams.

Route 69 was discontinued on 15 October 2004. The Route 69 was abolished completely and was replaced by the Route 16 which was extended to cover the former Route 69 fulltime.

== Operation ==
Routes 69 was operated out of Malvern Depot with Z, B and D class trams.
