= Victorian Railways W type carriage =

Victorian Railways W type carriage may refer to:

- Victorian Railways Short W type carriage
- Victorian Railways Long W type carriage
