= New Deal for Country Passengers =

Rail timetable in Victoria, Australia

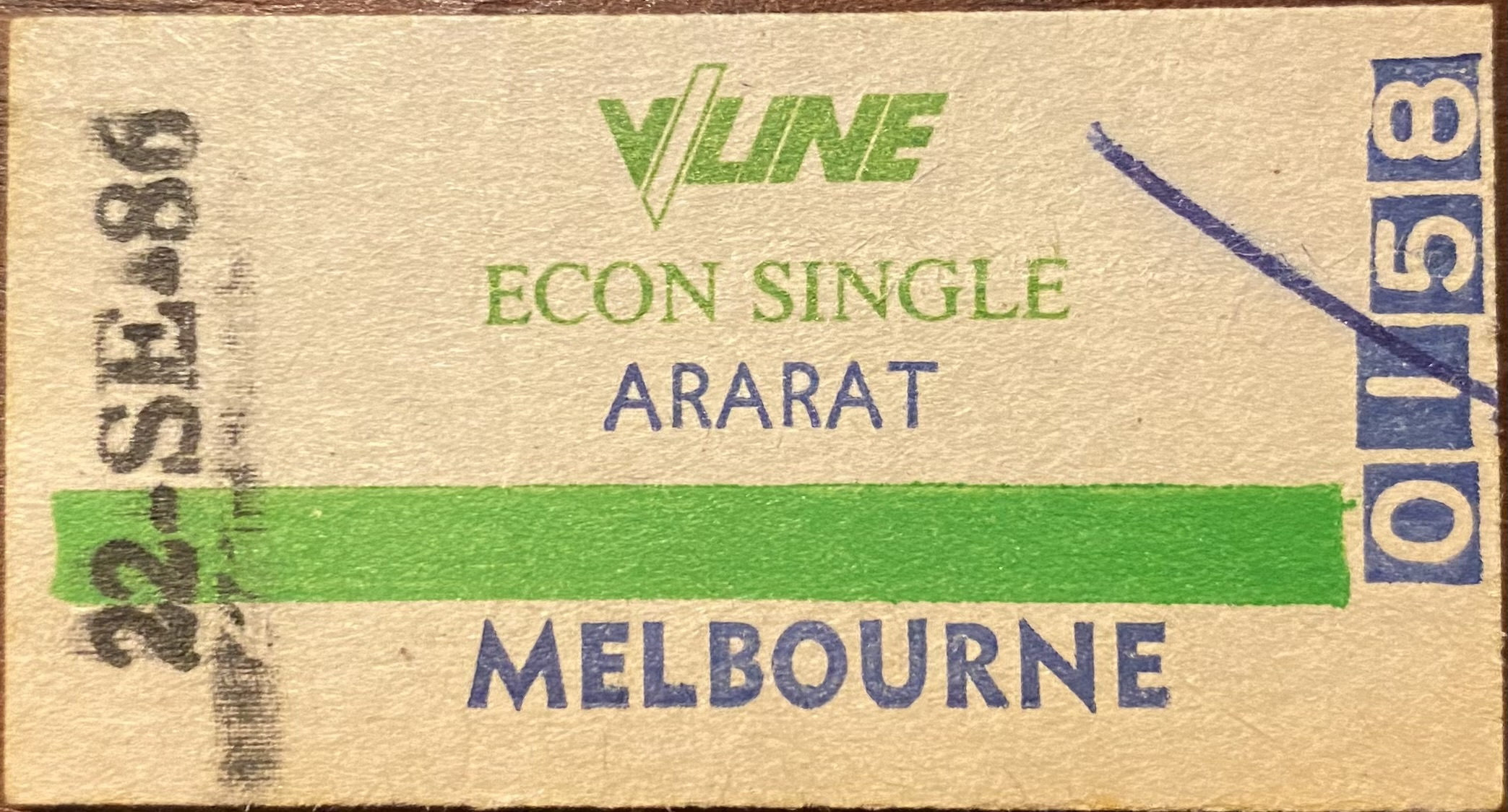
- V/Line ticket for the Ararat line in 1986

Overview
- Locale: Victoria, Australia

Service
- Ridership: ▲5.6 million (1990–91)

History
- Work began: 4 October 1981

The New Deal for Country Passengers was a rail timetable that significantly restructured regional passenger railway services in Victoria, Australia. It was introduced on 4 October 1981 and resulted in the closure of thirty-five little-used passenger stations, the improvement of rolling stock utilisation, and the introduction of new rolling stock.

The timetable and associated service changes resulted in an average patronage growth of 8.7% per year, from 3 million in 1981 to 5.6 million passengers in 1990–91.

== Political background ==
The Victorian Railways had been stuck in something of a "time warp" for a number of decades. The Bland Report of 1972 recommended the restructuring of railway management, the closure of uneconomic branch lines, and the replacement of most country rail passenger services with road coaches. By the start of the 1980s, passenger numbers had fallen to around 3 million per year, due to ageing rolling stock, unattractive timetables operating at poor frequencies, and the attractiveness of private motoring. After the Lonie Report of 1980 recommended further cuts to the network, many people called for the State Government to maintain a viable rail system.

Alan Reiher became Chairman of the Victorian Railways Board in July 1980, with the Victorian Railways having by then been re-branded as VicRail. By February 1981, Reiher's lobbying had resulted in a $115 million commitment from the Hamer Government to revitalise country rail passenger services in Victoria, the concept of which originated within the Planning Branch of VicRail.

VicRail pushed hard for the new timetables to be introduced by October 1981 so they would operate throughout the summer before the 1982 Victorian election. The Thompson Government, which had succeeded Hamer's ministry in June 1981, lost the 1982 election and was replaced by the Cain Government. However, the New Deal proved to have bi-partisan political support, and was further expanded by incoming Transport Minister Steve Crabb.

== Planning ==
Before the new timetable could be introduced, stopping patterns and running times were scrutinised to maximise the utilisation of locomotives and rolling stock. The majority of the country timetable had not been revised since the steam era of the 1950s, with excessive turn around times at termini and excessive numbers of stops at little-used stations. The research found that 30% to 50% more services could be run with a new timetable but with fewer carriages.

== Elements ==
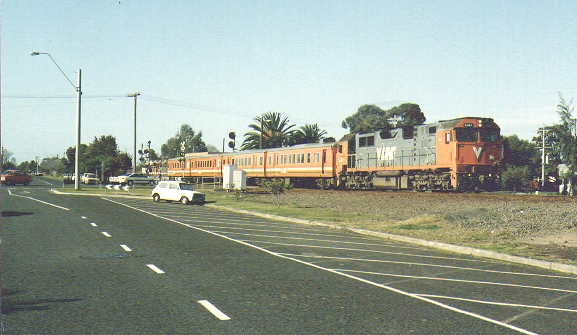
N class locomotive with H type carriages, wearing the 1980s V/Line livery

The railways went through a period of flux between 1980 and 1983, as the concept of the New Deal evolved.

As of February 1981, the initial elements of the 1981 New Deal included:

- Rebuilding of the four DRC railcars
- Rebuilding of six DERM railmotors with twice power, using 75 ft Harris carriages as new trailers to replace the MT series.
- Planned rebuilding 26 B class locomotives with new power plants and traction equipment, later known as the A class
- 4 6-carriage interurban electric sets for the Traralgon line, likely similar to the Comeng suburban trains then under construction
- Refurbishing 27 of the late 1930s-late 1950s S and Z type carriages
- Extending the 30/36-car order to 54, later 57 air conditioned steel bodied passenger cars, formed into 18/19 3-car N sets
- Elimination of older non-airconditioned wooden bodied carriage stock (including the E and W type carriages)
- A new timetable incorporating faster and more frequent services
- Changes in work practices onboard trains
- Operation of trains as fixed consists, instead of the previous labour-intensive practice of shunting and altering train sizes continually
- Introduction of a new computer seat reservation system VICRES
- Replacement of most branchline railcar services with road coach services

The new timetables were fairly successful, with adjustments made as the engines proved better timekeeping with lighter loads and as the fixed-set policy simplified shunting at Spencer Street station.

However, one of the sticking points was the lack of reliability from the railmotor fleet; by mid 1982 none of the DRC railcars were in good condition, and the DERM fleet was only achieving 38% availability; this required 'scratch' sets of between 2 and 4 older wooden carriages hauled by locomotives as replacements. VicRail looked into the costs of buying a new fleet of railmotors and found the cost for a 2-carriage airconditioned railmotor to be in the range of $1.6-2.5 million each. An alternative, cheaper proposal was to rebuild the DRC's electrical systems, and to replace other railmotor rosters with T class locomotives and refurbished Harris carriages. The proposed consist at the time was H-H-T-H-H, with the outer H carriages fitted with driving controls and all cars fitted with multiple-unit cabling.

Further improvements were carried out under the Cain Government from 1982:

- Ten N class diesel locomotives were ordered (later extended to 25, and the B class to A class conversions were cut back from 26 to 11)
- Thirteen T class locomotives were rebuilt into the P class incorporating Head End Power
- Former Harris suburban electric train carriages were converted into the H type carriages for Interurban services

By April 1983, the proposals to rebuild the DERM fleet had been dropped, and instead four 60 ft Harris carriages were to be rebuilt to complement the DRCs. The electric interurban sets had been dropped in late 1982; by this point the order for suburban Comeng vehicles had been nearly doubled (due to failures in refurbishing the Harris suburban fleet for continued electric network operation), so the interurban Comeng fleet wouldn't have been delivered until late 1986.

=== Timetable ===
The passenger network was recast, with Intercity routes from Melbourne to Albury, Bairnsdale, Bendigo, Dimboola, Mildura, Numurkah, Swan Hill and Warrnambool. Road coach services connected from Intercity train to towns no longer serviced by rail. Within the 'Intercity' network an 'Interurban' (commuter rail) was set up with more frequent services to Ballarat, South Geelong, Kyneton, Seymour and Traralgon.

The new timetable came into operation on 4 October 1981. Each Intercity service was accelerated by a large margin, up to 50 minutes in some instances. Unlike the Regional Fast Rail project of the early 2000s, no track or signalling improvements were carried out in order to speed up the services. Instead 35 little used stations were closed to passenger traffic, sectional running times were revised, higher powered locomotives allocated to services, and stops at railway refreshment rooms removed due to the introduction of on train catering. Turnaround times at country termini were also cut through the use of the twin cab B, A and N class locomotives, which did not need to use a turntable.

Interurban services were not sped up to the same degree, but more regular departure times were introduced, and the service frequencies increased. Some Melbourne – Ballarat services were routed via North Shore to ease track congestion at peak times on the route via Ballan.

=== Rolling stock ===
The A class rebuild contract was let in January 1983 to Clyde Engineering in Rosewater, South Australia. The first entered service in May 1984, but the project was abandoned in mid 1985 after rising costs due to structural fatigue. The 11th rebuild was delivered in August 1985. The N class were a new-build locomotive, mechanically similar to the A class. The major difference was the addition of head end power units, as it was believed this was a more efficient way of supplying power for air-conditioning and lighting than power vans or axle driven generator sets under carriages.

Passenger train operations were revolutionised, with fixed consist working (as in Europe) introduced to eliminate the need to shunt between services. This saw the end of a long-standing Victorian Railways tradition that the guard's van be at the end of the train. An order for 36 N type carriages was placed in 1977 for operation on the Geelong and Ballarat lines, but was extended under the New Deal to 54 carriages in 1981 and subsequently to 57 carriages, with the last being delivered in 1984. The carriages were part of a plan to remove 350 unheated and non air-conditioned wooden carriages (up to 70 years old) from service. The H type carriage conversion contract was placed in March 1983 with Clyde Engineering for 43 carriages, later progressively extended to 59 carriages. The new timetable required around 180 carriages, and by 1985 the majority of the fleet was made up of air conditioned steel bodied cars.

==== Fleet Transitions ====
As of 1981, the typical country passenger train consist included a van and three carriages, at least one of those a steel airconditioned type. As the N sets were gradually introduced the existing sets were shuffled around with older timber carriages withdrawn, with the intent to complete the transition by the end of 1983. The cars were intended to operate on the Warrnambool, Horsham, Shepparton, Geelong and Bendigo corridors, with all other services provided by the earlier airconditioned steel fleet and supplemented with the airconditioned E type carriages; a separate fleet of Comeng-styled country electric multiple units were to be built for long-distance services to Traralgon.

Carriages with corridors were rotated as necessary to put those corridors on the south side when running through Flinders Street Station; this ensured the new seat-booking system correctly identified window seats and direction of travel. Cars in sets were lettered A through D for the four-car sets, and if multiple sets were used on a single train then the west-end cars would be relettered to suit. For example, an eight-car train through Flinders Street station would have been labelled cars H through A from west end. Sets were constructed to have roughly equal capacity where possible, with the ABE to BE conversions and the long-type BW cars used in Z sets to boost capacity.

The October 1981 timetable required a handful of the older railmotors to stay in service, with two of the unreliable Tulloch DRC and four of the worn-out DERM types. These were run with one of the ex-W-type MT trailers, or if the railmotor failed then it would be replaced with a loco-hauled train using one of each type of the railmotor trailers, i.e. one MT-ex-W and one MT-ex-DERM fleet.

By February 1982, two N sets were in service as ACN-BN-BN, having entered service on Monday 5 October 1981. On weekdays, both sets ran on the 6:50am train from South Geelong to Melbourne; then one set ran a return Horsham then to Geelong, and the other set a return Ballarat then to South Geelong and shunt back to Geelong for overnight stabling. On weekends, one set ran to Horsham, the other ran four return Geelong trips. On Sundays one of the sets ran Geelong to Spencer Street, then a return to Swan Hill, and finally back to Geelong. The other set was undergoing rostered maintenance. Around this time, the expectation was that by end of 1983, all country services would be provided by steel airconditioned carriages and a small fleet of railmotors and EMUs.

===== As of February 1982 =====
- Z sets: 37 cars to form 8x 4-car sets with 5 spare; AS to BS or MBS (as code BRS had not yet been coined). Remainder of fleet constructed with E, W and some PL cars.

Locomotives:

- B Class locomotives used on medium-length runs
- L Class locomotives used Spencer Street to Traralgon, even on Sundays where traditionally the overhead power supply was switched off.
- S Class locomotives ran to Dimboola and some Shepparton/Numurkah runs, pending B Class rebuilding for higher power.
- T Class locomotives used on Werribee runs, beyond Traralgon, and on railmotor replacement runs.
- X (2nd series) Class locomotives ran Albury, Swan Hill, Dimboola and some Shepparton/Numurkah runs, pending B Class rebuilding for higher power.

Long-distance stock:

- 3x CE-AZ-MBS-BZ-BS for Albury and Swan Hill runs
- 1x CE-AZ-BE-BE-BE for Dimboola (BE cars to be replaced with MBS – BS – BS in short term)
- 2x CE-AZ-MRS-BZ-BS for the Vinelander to Mildura
- 2x BCE-AZ-Buffet-BE^{Aircon}-BE for Geelong to Sale or Bairnsdale. Buffet cars were Taggerty and Moorabool.

Commuter stock:

- 2x ACN-BN-BN for Geelong, Horsham and on Sundays, Swan Hill
- 4x CE-AE-BE-BW for Geelong
- 5x CE-AS-BE^{Aircon}-BW for Warrnambool, Ballarat and Shepparton
- 2x CE-AS-BE-BE for Bendigo and Numurkah
- 1x CE-AE-BE-BE-BW for Bacchus Marsh, running to Shepparton on Saturdays and Numurkah on Sundays
- 1x BCPL-BPL-BPL-BPL-BPL for Bacchus Marsh
- 1x BCE-AS-BE-BE-BE for Kyneton and Bendigo
- 1x CW-AE-BE-BW-BW for Warragul and Traralgon
- 1x CW-AE-BE-BE-BW for Warragul and Traralgon
- 2x CW-AS-BE-BW-BW for Warragul and Traralgon
- 3x CW-AW-BW-BW for Kyneton and Seymour as a railmotor replacement set
- 2x BCPL-BPL-BPL-BPL for Werribee
- 1x BCPL-BW-BCPL-BCPL-BPL-BW for Werribee
- 1x BCE-BE-BE for Sunbury

=== Service withdrawals ===
1981 also saw a number of passenger services withdrawn, including:

- Lilydale – Healesville: 1 March
- Ballarat – Donald: March
- Toolamba – Echuca: 2 March
- Numurkah – Cobram: 27 April
- Baxter – Mornington: 20 May
- Melbourne – Leongatha – Yarram: 6 June
- Frankston – Stony Point: June 1981
- Ararat – Portland: 12 September

Thirty-five passenger stations were closed on existing lines, or eighty-two stations when those on closed lines were included.

On existing lines, the closed stations were

- Western & Southwestern District: Moriac, Pirron Yallock, Boorcan, Panmure, Allansford, Gordon, Bungaree, Warrenheip, Wendouree, Trawalla, Buangor, Great Western, Glenorchy, Lubeck, Clunes, Talbot, Dunolly, Bealiba, Lascelles & Tempy
- Northern District: Carlsruhe, Elphinstone, Harcourt, Golden Square, Raywood, Prairie, Mitiamo, Macorna & Lake Boga
- Northeastern District: Mangalore, Longwood & Glenrowan
- Eastern District: Darnum, Fernbank, Lindenow

=== Services later re-introduced ===
- The Numurkah service was extended to Cobram from August 1983
- Leongatha line service was re-instated in December 1984
- Stony Point line service was re-instated from Frankston in September 1984

The Cobram and Leongatha services were later again withdrawn by the Kennett Government in August 1993.

=== Refreshment Room closures ===
A number of railway refreshment rooms were also closed, due to the introduction of on-train catering.

- Colac – Warrnambool line: 24 April 1983
- Ballarat – Dimboola line: 18 December 1981
- Ararat – Dimboola line: 4 October 1981
- Horsham – Dimboola line: 30 October 1982
- Seymour – Albury line: 4 October 1981
- Warragul – Bairnsdale line: 4 October 1981

== Outcomes ==
Although the total cost of the New Deal eventually topped $100 million, the new services were far cheaper to operate and were far more attractive. By April 1983, VicRail General Manager R. J Gallacher claimed that country passenger traffic had increased by around 20% in the eighteen months since the New Deal had begun. By 1989 the strong growth in Interurban travel had led V/Line and the Government to look at the need to acquire further rolling stock, deliberations that would ultimately result in the introduction of the 130 km/h (81 mph) Sprinter railcar.

The strong foundations laid in the 1981 New Deal undoubtedly led to further massive investment in Country Rail Passenger services in Victoria in the early 2000s which resulted in the total re-building of Spencer Street station (Melbourne) as Southern Cross station. Also the four Inter-urban routes to Geelong, Ballarat, Bendigo and Traralgon were upgraded to allow a new generation of V/Locity trains to operate at up to 160 km/h. This program was known as the Regional Fast Rail project upgrade. From 1980/81 to 2007/08, patronage grew from 3 million trips to 12 million.

Further patronage increases and expansion of the V/Locity train fleet led to the need to provide separate tracks within the Inner Melbourne area for V/Line trains to access Southern Cross from the South Western, Western and Northern lines. The Regional Rail Link project included a new route to Geelong via Wyndham Vale that opened in June 2015.

== See also ==
- Rail transport in Victoria
- Operation Phoenix
- Regional Fast Rail project
