= List of Victorian Government infrastructure plans, proposals and studies =

Australian state infrastructure overview

== 1929 Metropolitan Town Planning Commission Plan ==
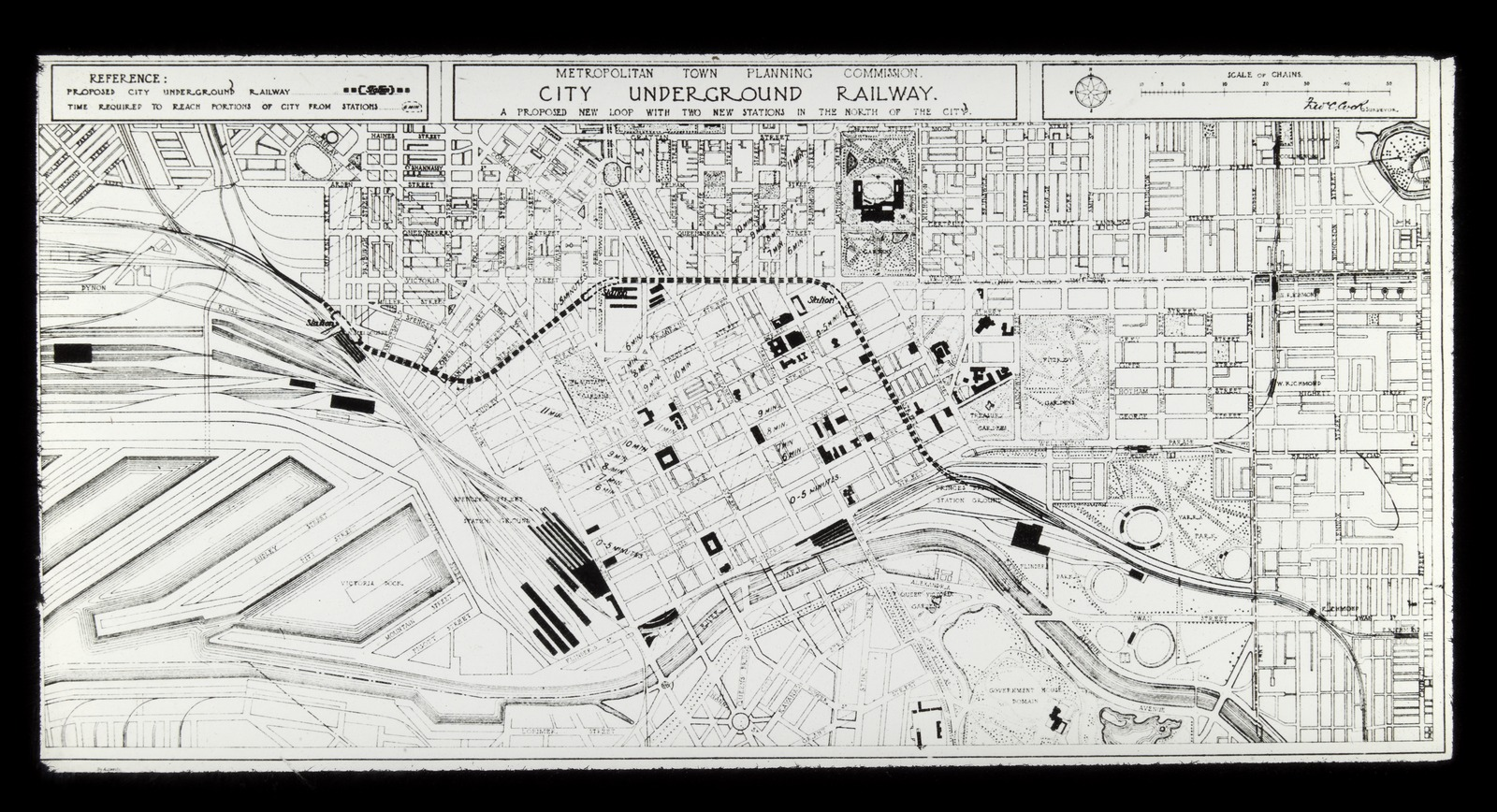
Map by the Metropolitan Town Planning Commission of a proposed underground railway c.1930-50. This plan eventually became the City Loop, completed in 1981.

The Metropolitan Town Planning Commission, established in 1922 by the Victorian state government, produced a report in 1929 that recommended a new underground railway in central Melbourne running via Exhibition and Victoria streets to reduce congestion at Finders Street station. The plan also proposed:

- A rail loop in Fishermans Bend
- A rail line to Doncaster via tunnel beneath Kew and Kew East
- A rail extension from Malvern East to Glen Waverley
- A bridge connecting Spencer Street station and the Port Melbourne and St Kilda lines

== 1940 Ashworth Improvement Plan ==
Proposed extensions to Melbourne's rail network, 1940.

A 1940 report by the Victorian Railways' Chief Engineer for Ways and Works recommended a number of rail improvement works, including an underground city railway, a line to Doncaster via the Kew spur, and the connection of the Alamein line to the Glen Waverley line at Malvern East.

== 1954 Melbourne Metropolitan Planning Scheme Report ==
A 1954 strategy released by the Melbourne & Metropolitan Board of Works recommended changes to Melbourne's land-use planning, an extensive network of freeways and a park system. It also recommended some expansions to the rail network, including an underground CBD rail line with three stations beneath Lonsdale Street. It also called for:

- A new rail loop in the industrial Fishermans Bend precinct with seven new stations to transport workers
- A new north–south rail link and bridge connecting Spencer Street station with the Port Melbourne line, with a new station in Southbank
- A branch of the Hurstbridge line from Alphington to East Preston to serve Northcote, Preston and Heidelberg, running alongside Darebin Creek
- A branch of the Frankston line between Moorabbin and Highett stations to beachside suburb Beaumaris
- A new Mornington railway line from Frankston to Mornington via Mount Eliza

The report recommended against a line to Doncaster due to the high cost of tunnelling.

== 1969 Melbourne Transportation Plan ==
A major plan released by the Victorian state government of Henry Bolte called for the creation of 510 kilometres of freeways, and a number of new rail lines. The plan proposed:

- An underground rail loop in central Melbourne
- A line to Doncaster connecting with the network at Victoria Park station
- A line to Monash University Clayton
- An extension from Altona to Westona
- An extension from Huntingdale to Ferntree Gully
- A new line connecting Dandenong and Frankston
- Several extensions of suburban electric service along existing lines to Werribee, Rockbank, Sunbury, Craigieburn, Coldstream, Hastings and Mornington

None of these proposed lines were ever built, except for the underground rail loop which began construction in 1971 and progressively opened between 1981 and 1985. The lines to Werribee, Sunbury and Craigieburn were also eventually electrified.

== 1979 Lonie Report ==
In the words of the authors the Lonie Report aimed to: institute a study into all freight and passenger transport within Victoria, and to and from Victoria, in order to produce a co-ordinated transport system capable of meeting the needs of all residents of Victoria, having particular regard to the effect of transport on the balanced development of the state.

The study suggested reducing public transport services and increasing fares to reduce subsidies. They also suggested that Victoria's major highways should be duplicated and the reservation of land to allow the construction of road bypasses around major towns on these highways. In Melbourne, it was recommended that many freeways needed to be built and extended

== 1999 Linking Victoria ==
A strategy launched in 1999 by the state government of Steve Bracks called for an airport rail link to Melbourne Airport and the reopening of several regional railway lines.

== 2002 "Melbourne 2030" ==
Melbourne 2030 is a strategic planning policy framework for the metropolitan area of Greater Melbourne, intended to cover the period 2001–2030. During this period the population of the metropolitan area is expected to grow by a million people to over 5 million. Population projections now predict Melbourne's population could reach 7 million by that time and the State Government has since changed its strategy on the policy, abandoning the urban growth boundary in the north and west of Melbourne and compromising green wedges.

== 2006 Meeting our Transport Challenges ==
The Meeting our Transport Challenges was a plan from the Steve Bracks Labor Government, it was a plan to address issues around the transport network and growing suburbs

Some Proposals in the project were:

Upgrades to the SmartBus network, and to busses in the Doncaster Area

Multiple rail Duplication and Triplication including a 3rd track from Caulfield to Dandenong

Rail extensions including the South Morang Line (proposed to be built in 2016) and the Somerton link,

The Deer Park Bypass

Transit Cities: in the areas of Box Hill, Broadmeadows, Dandenong, Ringwood, Epping, Footscray, Frankston, Sydenham and Werribee. and in regional areas of Geelong, Ballarat, Bendigo and the Latrobe Valley.

== 2008 Victorian Transport Plan ==
The government of John Brumby responded to a major increase in rail patronage by releasing a plan in 2008 that called for a number of rail extensions, including the Regional Rail Link from west of Werribee to Southern Cross station, a new inner-city rail tunnel called the Melbourne Metro Rail Project, and electrification of the rail network to South Morang (completed in 2011), Sunbury (completed in 2012), Melton and Cranbourne East.

== 2013 Network Development Plan: Metropolitan Rail ==
New government agency Public Transport Victoria (PTV) released a detailed 20-year rail development plan in 2013 under the government of Denis Napthine. The report outlined a major expansion of the metropolitan rail network in Melbourne over a number of stages, with the goals of introducing a 'metro-style system' and extending the reach of the network. Significant projects identified for construction included the Metro Tunnel, the Airport rail link, a line to Doncaster, a line to Rowville, a second underground inner-city rail tunnel, and many rail electrification and duplication projects.

== 2014 Plan Melbourne 2014 ==
The plan outlines the growth of Melbourne to the year 2050 and becoming a "global city"

The plan had 9 Strategic Principles for the plan to follow,

- Principle 1: A distinctive Melbourne
- Principle 2: A globally-connected and competitive city
- Principle 3: Social and economic participation
- Principle 4: Strong communities
- Principle 5: Environmental resilience
- Principle 6: A polycentric city linked to regional cities
- Principle 7: Living locally – a ‘20-minute’ city
- Principle 8: Infrastructure investment that supports city growth
- Principle 9: Leadership and partnership

The plan also had 7 Outcomes and Objectives

- Delivering jobs and investment
- Housing choice and affordability
- A more connected Melbourne
- Liveable communities and neighbourhoods
- Environment and water
- A state of cities
- Implementation: Delivering better governance

== 2014 Project 10,000 ==
In the lead up to the 2014 Victorian state election the Victoria Labor Party came out with the Project 10,000 plan. This plan included projects to:

- Get 5,000 trucks a day off the West Gate Bridge
- Guarantee $2 billion for country and suburban roads
- Create 10,000 construction jobs
- Remove 50 of the worst level crossings
- Build Melbourne Metro Tunnel

== Plan Melbourne 2017 - 2050 ==
Plan Melbourne is a planning document for the metropolitan Melbourne for the period 2017-2050.
