= Manor railway station =

Former railway station in Victoria, Australia

Coordinates: 37°55′56.4″S 144°34′38.1″E

Manor
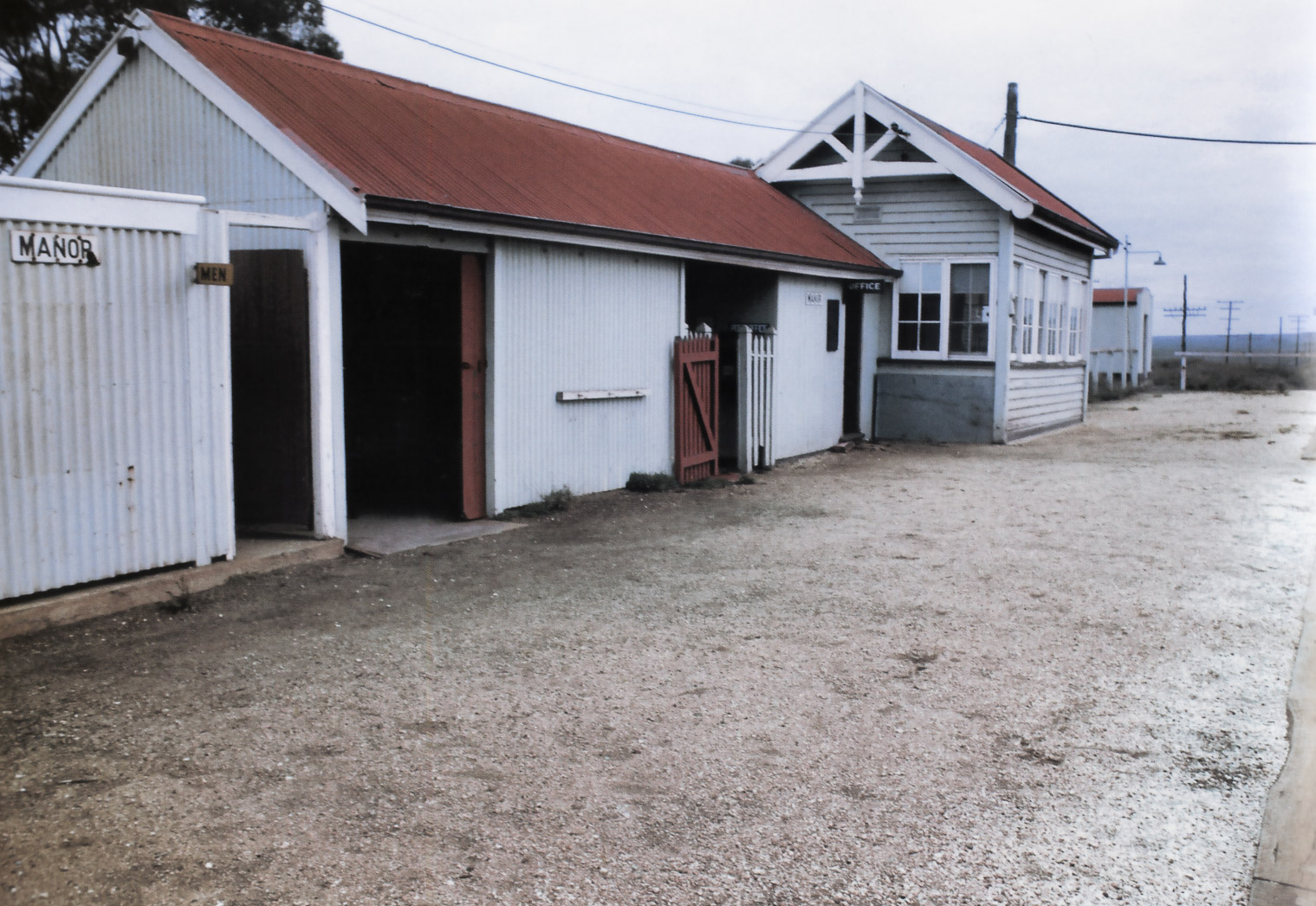
- Manor station platform and building in its final years

General information
- Line: Geelong
- Platforms: 1
- Tracks: 1 (plus crossing loop)

Other information
- Status: Closed

History
- Opened: 2 February 1911; 115 years ago
- Closed: 1 November 1970; 55 years ago

Passengers
- 1949–1950: 1,249

Former services
| Preceding station | V/Line | Following station |
|---|---|---|
| Werribee Racecourse towards Southern Cross | Warrnambool line | Little River towards Warrnambool |
List of closed railway stations in Victoria
Location

Manor is a closed railway station which was located about halfway between Werribee and Little River stations on the Geelong line in Victoria, Australia.

A signal box was opened at the site in February 1911, controlling a new crossing loop on the single line between Werribee and Little River. Passenger and goods facilities were provided in August 1914. At the start of the 1920s, the Victorian Railways opened a bluestone quarry 1.5 kilometres south of the station, to provide track ballast. The quarry was served by a long siding, parallel with the main line, leading from station yard. The quarry probably ceased operating in the 1930s.

Manor was closed in November 1970 when the line between Werribee and Little River was duplicated, making the crossing loop redundant. The buildings and platform were demolished shortly afterwards.

A crossing loop with the same name, located slightly to the north of the station site, was provided on the parallel Western standard gauge line when it opened in 1995. Manor is also where the Regional Rail Link branches from the direct Geelong-Melbourne rail line.
