= Werribee Racecourse railway station =

Former railway station in Victoria, Australia

Werribee Racecourse
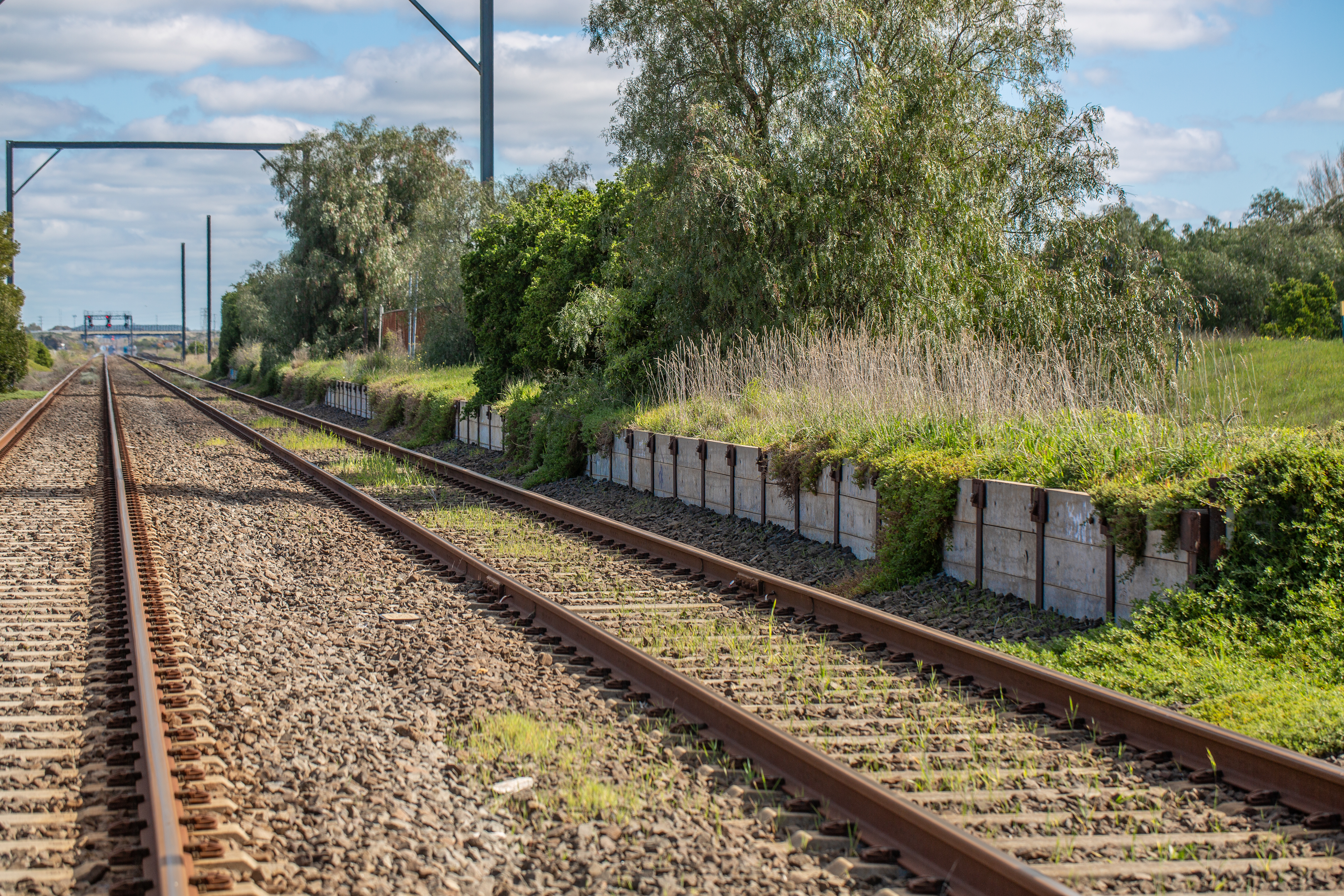
- Remains of the platform in August 2026

General information
- Coordinates: 37°54′26″S 144°38′29″E
- System: Closed commuter rail station
- Operator: V/Line
- Line: Geelong
- Distance: 33.72 kilometres from Southern Cross
- Platforms: 1
- Tracks: 3

Other information
- Status: Closed
- Station code: WRC

History
- Opened: 1884; 142 years ago
- Closed: March 1995; 31 years ago

Former services
Preceding station	V/Line	Following station
Werribee towards Spencer Street	Geelong line	Little River towards South Geelong
List of closed railway stations in Melbourne
Track layout
Location

Werribee Racecourse (sometimes stylised as Werribee Race Course) is a closed railway station that was operated by V/Line on the Geelong line. It opened in 1884 and served the Werribee Racecourse in the Melbourne suburb of Werribee until its closure in 1995. It is a ground level station, featuring one side platform.

Tangerine-coloured V/Line signage remained on the platform until sometime between February 2026 and late August 2026. The station is listed on the Victorian Heritage Register.

== History ==
Wyndham Racecourse and Recreation Reserve was gazetted on 22 April 1861. In 1884, a railway platform was constructed opposite to the racecourse's entrance gates for the convenience of patrons.

The racecourse closed during the 1890s. After this point, the railway platform remained, but it is unclear if trains continued to stop at the racecourse. The station appears in recreated Victorian Railways maps from 1900 and 1910. Cattle pits replaced hand gates at the level crossing near the station by 2 October 1911.

Horse racing returned to Werribee in 1912, when the Werribee Racing Club was established. In May 1915, the Werribee Shire Council approached the Victorian Railways Commissioners with a request to construct a new station platform next to Werribee Racecourse. Work began twelve years later in June 1927, with the station officially opened on 7 September 1927. The rebuilt platform continued to be located opposite to the racecourse's entrance gates.

During World War II, the Returned Sailors and Soldiers Imperial League of Australia (RSSILA) requested to make Werribee Racecourse a stopping place on visiting days to the local military camp.

Houses along the railway line next to the station (when it was operational) are believed to have been the residences of Victorian Railways officers.

The line between Werribee and Little River, which included Werribee Racecourse, was duplicated in 1970.

When the line from Newport to Werribee was electrified in the 1980s, Werribee Racecourse station was originally to be part of the system. Overhead stanchions were built along one track as far as the station, but they were never wired. The safeworking system used on the line does not permit a train to terminate and reverse once inside a signalling section, so without modifications to the signalling system, electric trains going to Werribee Racecourse station could not have returned to Werribee.

=== Closure ===
In March 1995, the Western standard gauge line was built to the west of the platform. This made it impossible to get to Werribee Racecourse station from the racecourse without crossing the standard gauge track, leaving the station unused.

V/Line services on the Geelong line continued to pass the station until the opening of the Deer Park–West Werribee line on 21 June 2015, when services were separated from Metro's Werribee line. Trains running on the standard gauge line continue to pass the station.

Although there have been some calls to reopen the station, this has not occurred.

== Platforms and services ==
The V/Line station at Werribee Racecourse had one platform. It was served by V/Line Geelong line trains travelling from Spencer Street station (now known as Southern Cross).

Werribee Racecourse platform arrangement
Platform	Line	Destination	Notes
1	Geelong	Spencer Street	Was only used during special events.
1	Geelong	South Geelong	Was only used during special events.

== Transport links ==
CDC Melbourne operates a bus route near the former site of Werribee Racecourse station, under contract to Public Transport Victoria:

- 192 : to Werribee station

== See also ==
- List of closed railway stations in Melbourne
- Geelong Racecourse railway station
- Williamstown Racecourse railway station
