= Tarneit railway station =

Railway station in Melbourne, Australia

Tarneit
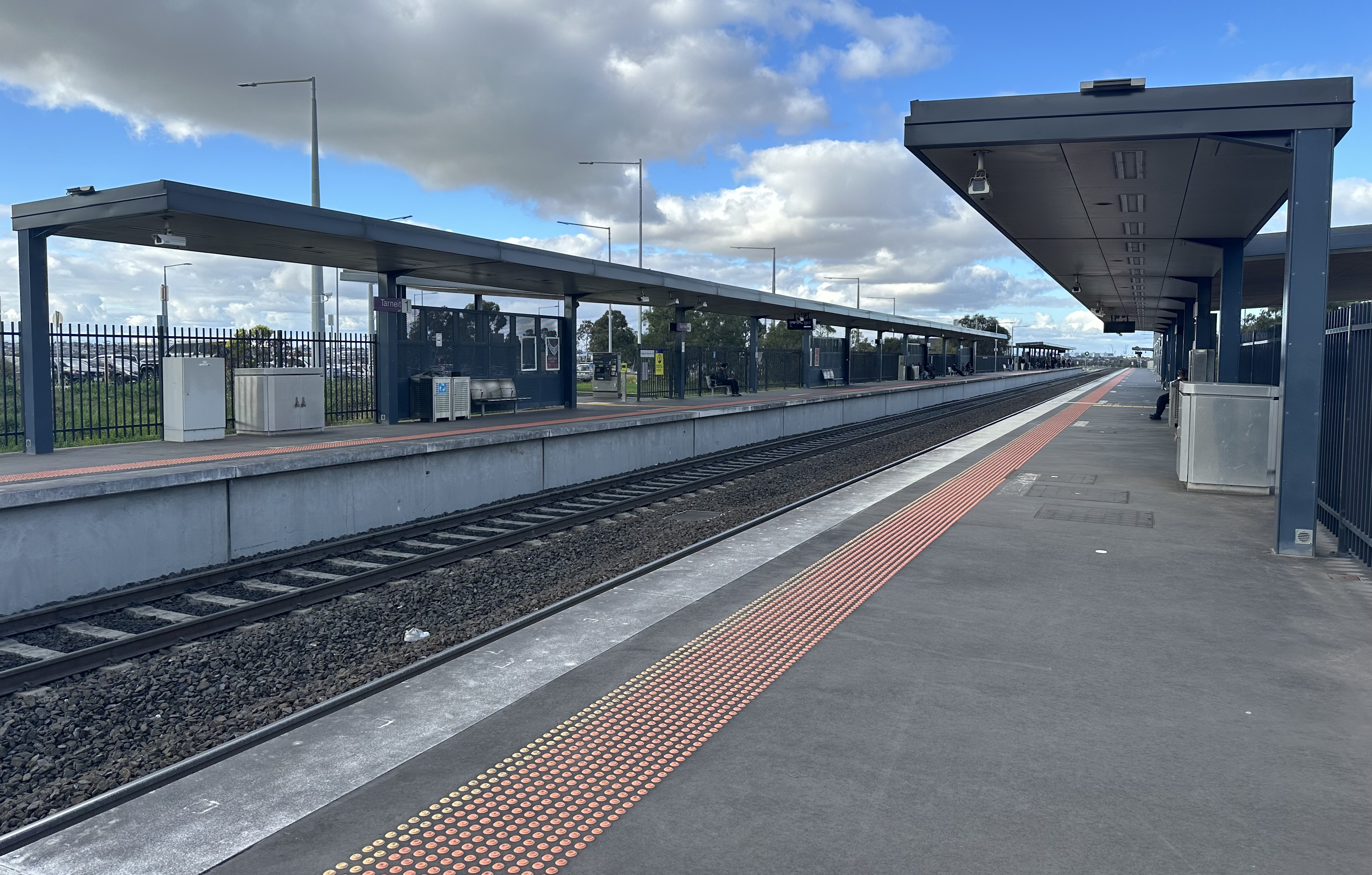
- Eastbound view from Platform 2 in July 2026

General information
- Location: Derrimut Road, Tarneit, Victoria 3029; City of Wyndham; Australia
- Coordinates: 37°49′56″S 144°41′43″E
- System: PTV regional rail station
- Owner: VicTrack
- Operator: V/Line
- Lines: Geelong Warrnambool; (Deer Park–West Werribee)
- Distance: 29.50 kilometres from Southern Cross
- Platforms: 2 side
- Tracks: 2
- Connections: Bus

Construction
- Structure type: Ground
- Parking: Yes
- Cycle facilities: Yes
- Accessible: Yes

Other information
- Status: Operational, staffed
- Station code: TNT
- Fare zone: Myki Zone 2
- Website: Public Transport Victoria

History
- Opened: 14 June 2015; 11 years ago

Passengers
- 2014–2015: 16,000
- 2015–2016: 0.713 million ▲4356.25%
- 2016–2017: 0.888 million ▲24.54%

Services
| Preceding station | V/Line | Following station |
|---|---|---|
| Deer Park towards Southern Cross | Geelong line | West Tarneit towards South Geelong or Waurn Ponds |
| Deer Park towards Southern Cross | Warrnambool line One service per night | West Tarneit One-way operation |
Track layout
Location

Tarneit railway station is a regional railway station operated by V/Line on the Geelong, Warrnambool and Deer Park-West Werribee line, part of the Victoria rail network. It serves the western suburb of Tarneit, in Melbourne, Victoria, Australia. Tarneit is a ground-level premium station, featuring two side platforms. The station opened on 14 June 2015.

Forming part of the Regional Rail Link project, the station was officially opened by the Victorian Premier, Daniel Andrews, and the Commonwealth Minister for Infrastructure and Regional Development, Warren Truss, with services commencing on 21 June 2015. It quickly became the second-busiest station on the V/Line network after Southern Cross.

Part of the southern car park at the station permanently closed in May 2023 to make way for the construction of a new bus interchange. Both the northern and southern car parks have been expanded, with the additional spaces in the northern car park opening in October 2022. The new bus interchange opened on 19 November 2023.

== Platforms and services ==
Tarneit has two side platforms. It is served by V/Line Geelong line trains and one Warrnambool line service towards Southern Cross each night.

Tarneit platform arrangement
| Platform | Line | Destination | Via | Notes | Source |
|---|---|---|---|---|---|
| 1 | Geelong line Warrnambool line | Southern Cross | Sunshine | | |
| 2 | Geelong line | Wyndham Vale, Geelong, South Geelong, Marshall, Waurn Ponds | Wyndham Vale | Services to Wyndham Vale, Geelong, South Geelong & Marshall only operate on weekdays. | |

== Transport links ==
CDC Melbourne operates nine bus routes and one FlexiRide service to and from Tarneit station, under contract to Public Transport Victoria:

- 150 : to Williams Landing station
- 151 : to Williams Landing station
- 152 : to Williams Landing station
- 154 : to Laverton station
- 160 : to Hoppers Crossing station
- 167 : to Hoppers Crossing station
- 170 : to Werribee station
- 180 : to Werribee station
- 182 : to Werribee station
- 186 : to West Tarneit station
- FlexiRide Tarneit North
