= Little River railway station =

Railway station in Victoria, Australia

Little River
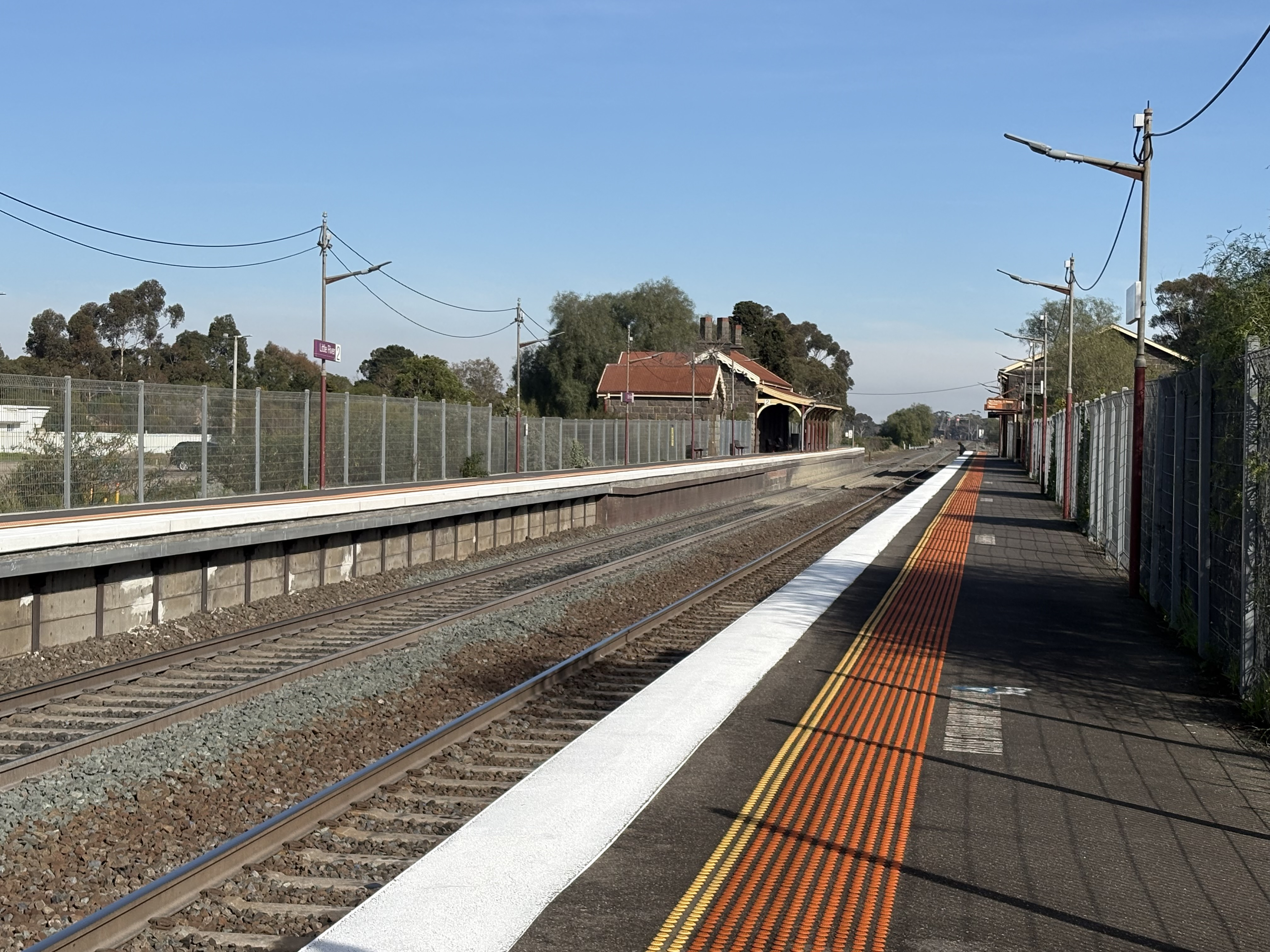
- South-west bound view from Platform 1, July 2026

General information
- Location: Edgars Road, Little River, Victoria 3211; City of Wyndham; Australia
- Coordinates: 37°57′46″S 144°29′56″E
- System: PTV regional rail station
- Owner: VicTrack
- Operator: V/Line
- Lines: Geelong Warrnambool (Warrnambool)
- Distance: 47.56 kilometres from Southern Cross
- Platforms: 2 side
- Tracks: 3

Construction
- Structure type: Ground
- Parking: Yes
- Cycle facilities: Yes
- Accessible: Yes

Other information
- Status: Operational, unstaffed
- Station code: LTR
- Fare zone: Myki zone 2
- Website: Public Transport Victoria

History
- Opened: 1 January 1857; 169 years ago
- Rebuilt: 25 July 1981
- Former names: Bulban (1910-1912)

Services
Preceding station	V/Line	Following station
Wyndham Vale towards Southern Cross	Geelong line	Lara towards Geelong or Waurn Ponds
Former services until 2015
Preceding station	V/Line	Following station
Werribee towards Southern Cross	Geelong line	Lara towards Geelong or Waurn Ponds
Location
- Location within Victoria

Little River railway station is a regional railway station operated by V/Line on the Geelong and Warnambool lines, part of the Victoria rail network. It serves the town of Little River, in Victoria, Australia. Little River is a ground-level unstaffed station, featuring two side platforms. The station opened on 1 January 1857, with the current double track layout provided in July 1981.

Initially opened as Little River, the station was renamed two times. It was renamed to Bulban on 2 May 1910, then was renamed back to its original and current name of Little River on 9 December 1912.

== History ==
When the Geelong and Melbourne Railway Company constructed the line, it proposed that the station be built on the northern side of Little River. However, the company had trouble negotiating with the relevant land owner, so the first station was located on the south side of the river. The former platform mound of that station was finally removed in 1994, when the Western standard gauge line was being constructed.

The buildings and adjoining goods shed of the current station, on the north side of the river, are some of the earliest station buildings in Victoria. They are constructed of bluestone, to an original design by Frederick Kawerau, for the Geelong and Melbourne Railway Company, and were completed by the Victorian Railways in 1864. Features of note include the basement holding cells and the Victorian Railways plaques on the station gables. The buildings layouts have changed over the years, as shown in the State Library drawings, and they are listed on the Victorian Heritage Register.

On 25 October 1970, the newly duplicated the line from Werribee to Little River was opened, and the goods siding closed. In 1972, a crossover at the up end of the station was abolished. On 4 June 1981, the newly duplicated line to Lara was opened, and a second platform (Platform 1) was provided.

In 1995, the Western standard gauge line opened, passing to the north and west of the station. The line is primarily used by freight trains, as well as The Overland passenger service to and from Adelaide. However, it does not stop at the station.

In 2010, the goods shed had started to crumble. Infrastructure owner VicTrack conducted an inspection of the shed, which revealed its doors and windows had been forced open, and, in liaison with the lessee V/Line, VicTrack undertook work to ensure the shed was secured as quickly as possible from further damage.

Disused station Werribee Racecourse is located between Little River and Werribee, as was the now-demolished station Manor.

=== In music ===
Little River Band included some scenes shot at Little River station in the music video for their 1978 single, "Shut Down Turn Off".

== Platforms and services ==
Little River has two side platforms. It is serviced by V/Line Geelong line services, as well as one Warrnambool line service to Southern Cross every weekday night.

Little River platform arrangement
Platform	Line	Destination	Stopping Pattern	Notes
1	Geelong line Warrnambool line	Southern Cross	All stations and limited express services	
2	Geelong line	South Geelong, Marshall, Waurn Ponds	All stations and limited express services	Services to South Geelong and Marshall only operate during weekday peaks.
