= Lara railway station =

Railway station in Victoria, Australia

Lara
- Northbound view of station building in October 2026

General information
- Location: Hicks Street, Lara, Victoria 3212; City of Greater Geelong; Australia
- Coordinates: 38°01′19″S 144°24′53″E
- System: PTV regional rail station
- Owner: VicTrack
- Operator: V/Line
- Lines: Geelong Warrnambool (Warrnambool)
- Distance: 57.50 kilometres from Southern Cross
- Platforms: 2 (1 island)
- Tracks: 4
- Connections: Bus

Construction
- Structure type: Ground
- Parking: Yes
- Cycle facilities: Yes
- Accessible: Yes

Other information
- Status: Operational, staffed part-time
- Station code: LAR
- Fare zone: Myki zone 2/3/4
- Website: Public Transport Victoria

History
- Opened: 1 November 1856; 170 years ago
- Rebuilt: 1981
- Former names: Duck Ponds (1856-1875)

Services
| Preceding station | V/Line | Following station |
|---|---|---|
| Little River towards Southern Cross | Geelong line | Corio towards Geelong or Waurn Ponds |
| Little River towards Southern Cross | Warrnambool line One service per weekday night | Corio One-way operation |
| Wyndham Vale towards Southern Cross | Warrnambool line One service per weekend night | Corio One-way operation |
Location
- Location within Victoria

Lara railway station is a regional railway station operated by V/Line on the Geelong and Warrnambool lines, part of the Victoria rail network. It serves the town of Lara, in Victoria, Autralia. Lara is a ground-level part-time staffed station, featuring an island platform with two faces. The station opened on 1 November 1856, with the current station provided in 1981 and waiting room provided in 1999.

Initially opened as Duck Ponds, the station was given its current name of Lara on 30 June 1875.

The Western standard gauge line to Adelaide runs immediately west of the station.

== History ==
When Lara station opened, it was the temporary terminus of the Geelong – Melbourne line. The present station building was constructed in the 1920s, and the existing single platform on the east side of the line was converted into an island platform in June 1981, when the line from Lara to Little River was duplicated. In September of that year, the line to Corio was duplicated.

In 1973, a signal panel was provided at the station, and in 1981, it relocated into the station building. It was abolished in January 2006. No.2 road (loop siding) was also extended in 1973, providing a crossing loop. The loop siding is generally used by trains serving the Avalon Airshow, which terminate at Lara.

In 1962, flashing light signals were provided at the McClelland Avenue level crossing, located nearby in the down direction of the station, with boom barriers provided later on in 1981.

In 1993, No.2 siding was abolished, along with a dwarf signal. In 1999, the station waiting room received an upgrade, including the installation of glass sliding doors.

== Platforms and services ==
Lara has one island platform with two faces. It is serviced by V/Line Geelong line services, as well as one Warrnambool line service to Southern Cross each night.

Lara platform arrangement
| Platform | Line | Destination | Notes |
|---|---|---|---|
| 1 | Geelong line Warrnambool line | Southern Cross | One Warrnambool line service from Warrnambool every night. |
| 2 | Geelong line | Geelong, South Geelong, Marshall, Waurn Ponds | |

== Transport links ==
CDC Geelong operates three routes to and from Lara station, under contract to Public Transport Victoria:

- 10 : to Corio Shopping Centre via Lara South
- 12 : to Lara West
- 18 : to Avalon Airport
