= Deer Park–West Werribee railway line =

Railway line in Melbourne, Australia

Deer Park–West Werribee line
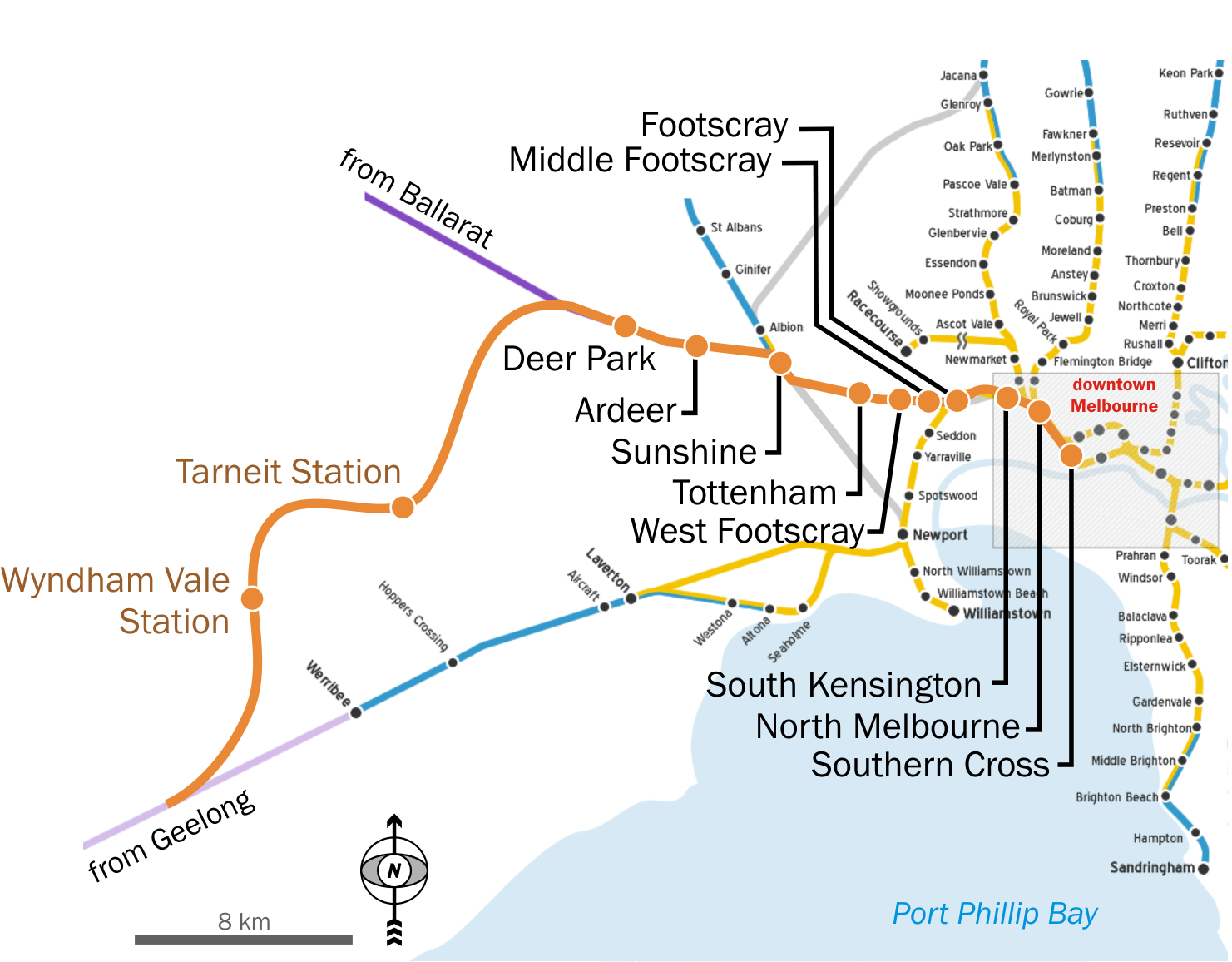

Overview
- Status: Operational
- Owner: VicTrack
- Locale: Melbourne, Victoria, Australia
- Termini: Southern Cross; Wyndham Vale
- Stations: 4

Service
- Services: Geelong; Warrnambool
- Operator: V/Line

History
- Work began: June 2012
- Opened: 21 June 2015
- Completed: October 2014

Technical
- Line length: 28 km (17 mi)
- Num of tracks: 2
- Track gauge: 1,600 mm (5 ft 3 in)
- Electrification: Unelectrified

The Deer Park–West Werribee railway line is a 28 km (17 mi) non-electrified rail line in the outer-western suburbs of Melbourne, Victoria. The line was constructed as part of the Regional Rail Link project between June 2012 and October 2014, and opened in June 2015, with the goal of separating V/Line's Geelong line services from Metro's Werribee line services. It runs from a junction site near Manor to another junction site near Deer Park, where it joins the rest of the Regional Rail Link towards the line's terminus at Southern Cross.

The full route of the line carries the Geelong V/Line rail service, which now also serves the three stations built on the line to serve growth areas in Melbourne's western suburbs: Tarneit, West Tarneit and Wyndham Vale. One more station is currently planned for construction in Truganina.

Ballarat services join the line at Deer Park, while Bendigo services do not use the line at all, instead using the other part of the Regional Rail Link from Sunshine − Southern Cross.

== History ==
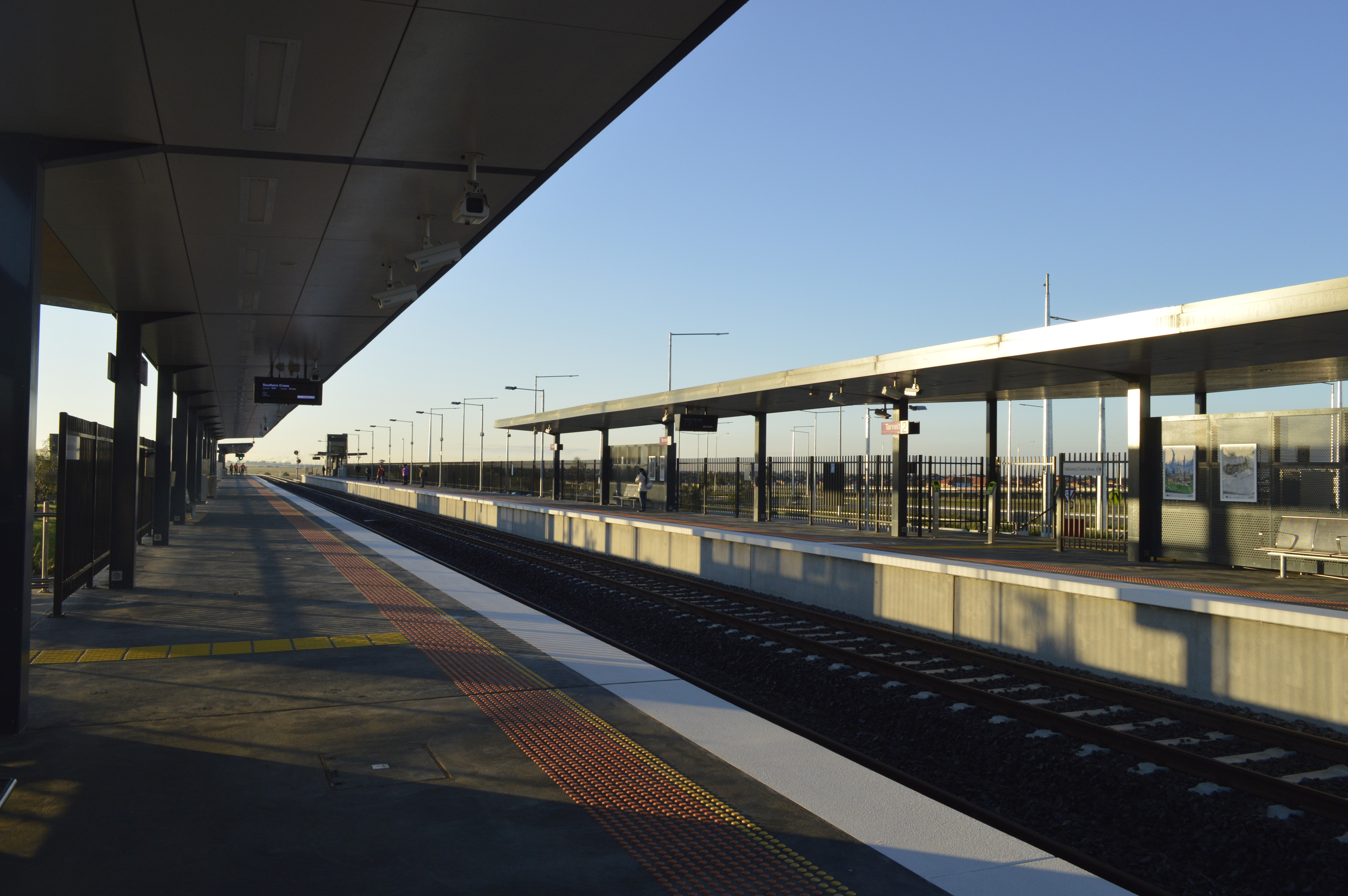
The new Tarneit station before opening in June 2015

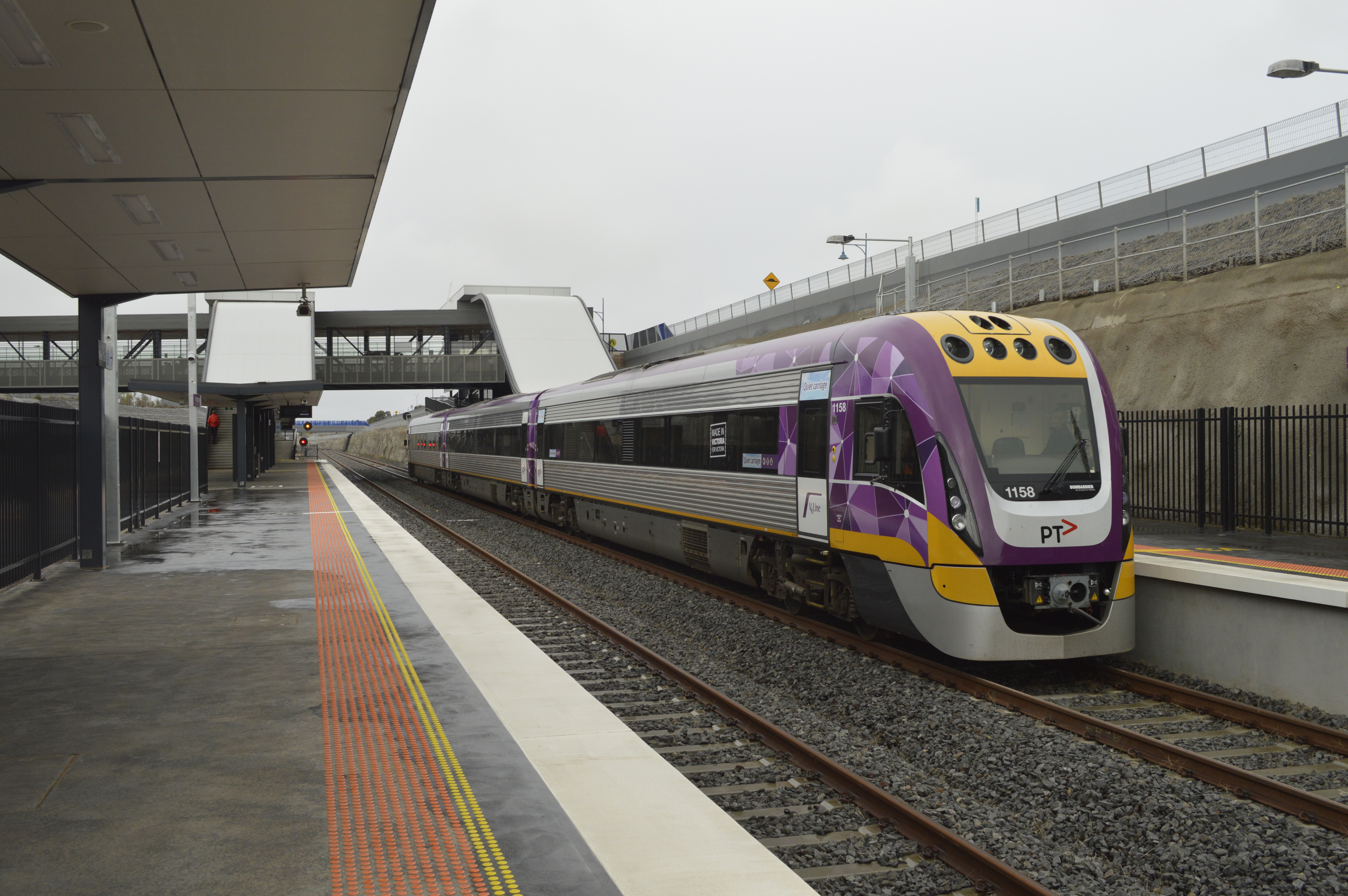
The new Wyndham Vale station before opening in June 2015

The Deer Park–West Werribee railway line was built as part of the Regional Rail Link project, with the aim of increasing capacity on the rail network by separating regional and suburban passenger services in Melbourne's west. The line runs from Manor junction (on the Warrnambool line) to a junction site approximately three kilometres west of Deer Park railway station (on the Serviceton line), where it joins a new pair of tracks also dedicated for regional services, bypassing several stations on the Sunbury line. The double-track line had two stations built on it, Tarneit and Wyndham Vale, to housing estates in those areas.

The Geelong V/Line rail service was rerouted to use the line, no longer sharing tracks with Werribee line services operated by Metro Trains. Ballarat services only join the alignment at Deer Park, and Bendigo services do not use this line at all; they instead join the other part of the Regional Rail Link at Sunshine.

Test trains began operating upon completion of the line in October 2014 and passenger services started on 21 June 2015.

The station at Tarneit West opened as West Tarneit on 13 September 2026.

== Future expansion ==
In 2018 the Andrews Government announced the Western Rail Plan, which included electrification and quadruplication of the line. In 2023, it was reported that the Western Rail Plan no longer included quadruplication and there are no concrete plans to electrify the line.

During the 2022 Victorian state election, in addition to the station at West Tarneit opened in 2026, the Andrews Government committed to building a new infill station on the corridor at Truganina.
