= West Tarneit railway station =

Railway station in Melbourne, Australia

West Tarneit
- Westbound view from Platform 2, September 2026

General information
- Location: Cnr Leakes and Davis Roads; Tarneit, Victoria 3029; City of Wyndham; Australia
- Coordinates: 37°49′38″S 144°39′46″E
- System: PTV regional rail station
- Owner: VicTrack
- Operator: V/Line
- Lines: Geelong Warrnambool; (Deer Park–West Werribee)
- Platforms: 2
- Tracks: 2
- Connections: Bus

Construction
- Structure type: At-grade
- Parking: Up to 400
- Cycle facilities: Bike hoops and storage
- Accessible: Yes

Other information
- Status: Operational, unstaffed
- Station code: WET
- Fare zone: Myki zone 2
- Website: engage.vic.gov.au

History
- Opened: 13 September 2026; 2 months ago

Services
| Preceding station | V/Line | Following station |
|---|---|---|
| Tarneit towards Southern Cross | Geelong line | Wyndham Vale towards South Geelong or Waurn Ponds |
| Tarneit towards Southern Cross | Warrnambool line One service per night | Wyndham Vale One-way operation |
Track layout
Location

West Tarneit railway station is a regional railway station operated by V/Line on the Geelong and Deer Park-West Werribee line, part of the Victoria rail network. It serves the western suburb of Tarneit, in Melbourne, Victoria, Australia. West Tarneit is a ground-level unstaffed station, featuring two side platforms. The station opened on 13 September 2026.

== History ==
=== Planning ===
The Regional Rail Link was opened on 21 June 2015, designed to remove V/Line services from the suburban Werribee line and to serve the growing developments around Tarneit and Wyndham Vale. The new rail line was built running through what would become the site of the station, however no station was built although provision was left for a station to be built in the future. Provisions for potential future stations were left at Truganina, Davis Road and Black Forest Road.

Funding for the construction of a new station at Davis Road was announced in October 2022. Funding included $200 million for the station at Davis Road, the beginning of planning for a potential future station at Truganina, four bays for bus services, and 400 spaces for commuter parking. The government cited that an additional station for Tarneit was needed as the existing Tarneit had only limited parking and even more limited accessible parking.

In spite of the government announcement, local residents called out the government, stating that the station was "years late", as the station had been promised years prior as part of the wider Western Rail Plan in 2017.

Federal funding for the station was allocated and confirmed in March 2025 by the Albanese government. This funding was part of a wider scheme of upgrading infrastructure such as level crossings along regional rail lines across Victoria.

The station was planned to be built by the Level Crossing Removal Project.

=== Construction ===
Site investigations at the site of the future station began in December 2024. The site investigations included soil testing around the future station and the future overall precinct. Investigations were completed by April 2025 with major station construction beginning shortly afterwards. The complete designs for West Tarneit were finalised and released to the public in September 2025.

As part of construction, the Geelong Line was closed between the city and Wyndham Vale for 14 days, between 10 January and 24 January 2026 to allow for the construction of the future station pedestrian underpass. As part of the shutdown, both of the station platforms as well as the steel frames for the platform shelters were built. In May 2026, the Geelong Line was closed to trains again to allow for the installation of new and updated signalling in order to allow for trains to run closer together and therefore more frequently between Wyndham Vale and Southern Cross. These works, alongside the construction and paving on the station car park and bus interchange were completed in July.

After the completion of the car park and bus interchange in July, concreting of the foot and bicycle paths began around the station. This included the paths through the pedestrian underpass and the paths into the station from the car park. The pedestrian paths at the station were completed in August. Bike locker facilities were built at the station as part of a wider scheme to improve cycling connectivity in and around Tarneit. As well as cycling amenities, the West Tarneit station precinct was developed to feature advanced lighting as well as separation between foot and cycling traffic around the station.

=== Opening ===
West Tarneit station, alongside a revamped Wyndham area bus network, opened on 13 September 2026, with regular Geelong Line services stopping at the station from first service. The first train to stop at the station was the 7:26am service to Waurn Ponds.

As part of the station's opening, a new bus route, the Route 186 was introduced, running between West Tarneit station and Tarneit station. The Route 182 was also altered to serve the station.

== Platforms and services ==
West Tarneit is operated by V/Line and served by the Geelong line and one Warrnambool line service towards Southern Cross each night. The station consists of two platforms in a side platform layout.

West Tarneit platform arrangement
| Platform | Line | Destination | Via | Stopping Pattern | Notes | Source |
|---|---|---|---|---|---|---|
| 1 | Geelong line Warrnambool line | Southern Cross | Sunshine | All stations | | |
| 2 | Geelong line | Wyndham Vale, Geelong, South Geelong, Marshall, Waurn Ponds | Wyndham Vale | All stations and limited express services | Services to Wyndham Vale, Geelong, South Geelong & Marshall only operate on weekdays. | |

== Transport links ==
CDC Melbourne operates two bus routes to West Tarneit station, under contract to Transport Victoria:

- 182 : Werribee station – Tarneit station
- 186 : to Tarneit station
