= Victorian Railways power vans =

Power Vans
- Manufacturer: Victorian Railways
- Built at: Newport Workshops, others
- Operators: Victorian Railways; South Australian Railways; New South Wales Government Railways & successors

Specifications
- Power supply: Diesel generators
- Track gauge: 5 ft 3 in (1,600 mm)

The Victorian Railways (VR) of Australia and successors have utilised a number of different types of railway carriages and wagons for the supply of head end power to passenger trains on the Victorian railway network.

When train travellers around the world began to enjoy such comforts as lighting, and heating and cooling, the Victorian Railways initially employed axle mounted generators], then progressed to more reliable head-end power (HEP) as a source for this equipment. In more recent times, vans have been specially built for the purpose of supplying HEP, or special generators are fitted to locomotives (the N and P classes)

== Victorian Railways, later V/Line ==
=== BP98 ===
From 1961 to 1963, a single van was fitted with a generator set to provide power to passenger trains running between Melbourne and Albury on the new standard gauge route. The van was numbered BP98 and painted in blue with gold stripes to match the carriages.

A video of the vehicle in service is available online, timestamp 2:31 to 2:44.

=== PH Vans ===
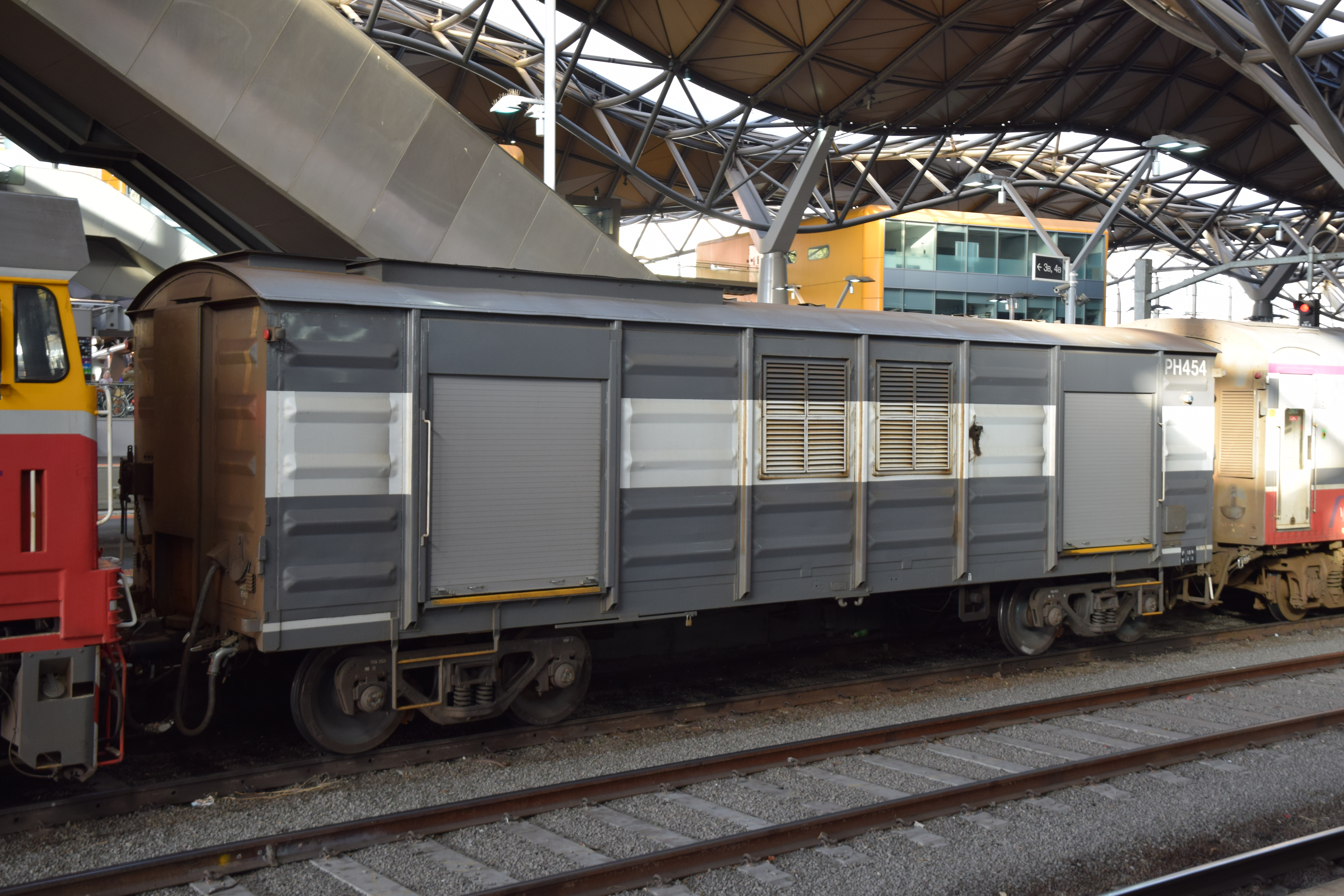
HEP Type Power generator car No.PH454 working with 4-car FN set No.FN19

By the mid-1980s, passenger trains within Victoria almost always required head-end power (HEP), as the wooden cars were phased out. While a number of trains had self-contained generator supplies, the majority required HEP from outside sources. The N and P class locomotives were fitted with HEP generators, but if another locomotive were to haul the train or if the locomotive's HEP generator failed, there would be no power supply for the carriages.

To this end, three louvre series vans were fitted with generator sets and cabling in 1984. The corrugated roofs were replaced with sheet metal. The vans were coded PH and numbered 451, 452 and 453. They were converted from VLPY freight wagons 139, 140 and 142 respectively, and appeared in a grey livery.

The first sighting of a PH van in use was on 26 September 1985, with a PH van on the rear of a consist SH-DH-BJ-SH; noting the intermediate Overland sitting carriage.

PH451 had Super Service bogies fitted by 1995, PH452 sometime between 1991 and 1995, and PH453 in mid-1995. These vans are all in service on the broad gauge today, in a plain, dark blue livery. In late 2009/early 2010, PH 454 was converted from DN 404, and painted grey with a white stripe.

By 18 March 2025, PH454 was officially removed from the V/Line rolling stock register. Steamranger in South Australia announced on their Facebook page that they had acquired six H type carriages from V/Line on 6 November 2024, and that asset transfer had included van PH454.

==== PHS purchases ====
In late 1993 or early 1994, before the cessation of the locomotive-hauled Sydney Express and its replacement with XPT trains, V/Line purchased two power vans from the State Rail Authority of New South Wales, PHS2294 and PHS2296, because their generator sets were very similar to those in use in the PH vans.

== Victorian & New South Wales Joint Stock ==
=== PHN vans ===
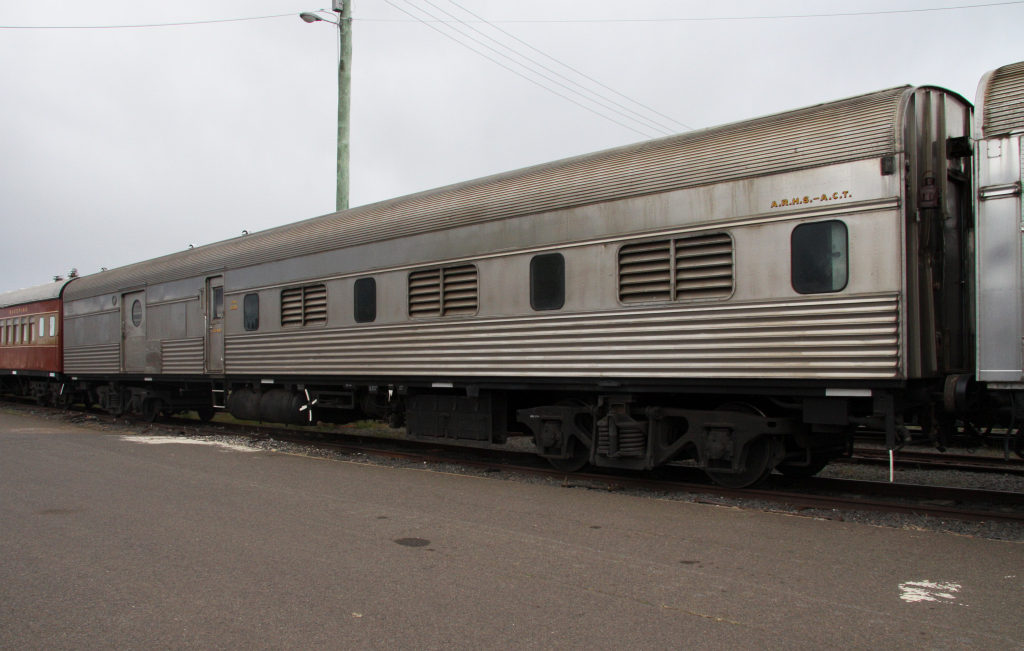
Standard Gauge Joint Stock van PHN 2381, preserved at the Canberra Railway Museum

The PHN class were Standard Gauge Joint Stock owned by the New South Wales Government Railways and VR. They were steel fluted sided vans, and ran between Melbourne and Sydney. Six were built from 1961 by Commonwealth Engineering, Sydney, three each for the Southern Aurora and Spirit of Progress numbered PHN 2361 - PHN 2363 and PHN 2369 - PHN 2371 respectively.

PHN 2370, destroyed in the Violet Town collision in 1969, was replaced by PHN 2381 built in 1970. In 1981, PHN 2362 and 2363 were renumbered 2862 and 2863 respectively.

In 2016, V/Line acquired NAM 2337 from the Hunter Valley Railway Trust, Rothbury for conversion to a fourth power van (with PCJ491, 492 and 493 ex PCO 1, 3 and 2) for standard gauge N set consists. V/Line did have the option of modifying an ex Overland CO luggage van, but that wasn't deemed practical. As of late 2016, the car is at Downer Rail's Newport Workshops being stripped and converted. (March 2017 Update: This Conversion of NAM2337 has reportedly now been stopped, but the interior has already been stripped out)
