= Wyndham Vale railway station =

Railway station in Melbourne, Australia

Wyndham Vale
- Southbound view from Platform 2, September 2026

General information
- Location: Manor Lakes Boulevard, Manor Lakes, Victoria 3024; City of Wyndham; Australia
- Coordinates: 37°52′20″S 144°36′32″E
- System: PTV regional rail station
- Owner: VicTrack
- Operator: V/Line
- Lines: Geelong Warrnambool; (Deer Park–West Werribee)
- Distance: 40.30 kilometres from Southern Cross
- Platforms: 2 side
- Tracks: 2
- Connections: Bus

Construction
- Structure type: Below Ground
- Parking: Yes
- Cycle facilities: Yes
- Accessible: Yes

Other information
- Status: Operational, staffed
- Station code: WVL
- Fare zone: Myki Zone 2
- Website: Public Transport Victoria

History
- Opened: 14 June 2015; 11 years ago

Services
Preceding station	V/Line	Following station
West Tarneit towards Southern Cross	Geelong line	Little River towards South Geelong or Waurn Ponds
West Tarneit towards Southern Cross	Geelong line	Terminus
West Tarneit One-way operation	Warrnambool line One service per weekday night	Little River towards Warrnambool
West Tarneit One-way operation	Warrnambool line One service per weekend night	Lara towards Warrnambool
Track layout
Location

Wyndham Vale railway station is a regional railway station on the Deer Park-West Werribee line, part of the Victorian railway network. It serves the western Melbourne suburb of Manor Lakes, which was part of Wyndham Vale until being gazetted as a separate suburb in March 2016, nine months after the station opened. Wyndham Vale station is a ground level premium station, featuring two side platforms. It opened on 14 June 2015.

Built as part of the Regional Rail Link project, it was officially opened on 14 June 2015 by Premier Daniel Andrews and the federal Minister for Infrastructure and Regional Development, Warren Truss, with services commencing on 21 June 2015.

A turnback siding is located between the two running lines just to the south of the station, used for peak hour terminating services from Melbourne. A stabling yard has also been built to the north of the station. Construction began in mid-2018, and the sidings were opened in April 2020.

Under the Western Rail Plan, announced by the Andrews State Government in 2018, the station will eventually become part of the metropolitan railway network.

== Platforms and services ==
The V/Line station at Wyndham Vale has two side platforms. It is served by V/Line Geelong line and one Warrnambool line service towards Southern Cross each night.

Wyndham Vale platform arrangement
Platform	Line	Destination	Via	Notes	Source
1	Geelong line Warrnambool line	Southern Cross	Sunshine		
2	Geelong line	Southern Cross	Sunshine	Weekday peaks only.	
2	Geelong line	Geelong, South Geelong, Marshall, Waurn Ponds	Lara	Services to Geelong, South Geelong & Marshall only operate on weekdays.	

== Transport links ==
CDC Melbourne operate five bus routes via Wyndham Vale station, under contract to Public Transport Victoria:

- 166 : to Hoppers Crossing station
- 190 : to Werribee station
- 191 : Werribee station – Jubilee Estate (Wyndham Vale)
- 192 : to Werribee station
- 194 : to Werribee station via Ison Road
