= Geelong line =

Passenger rail service in Victoria, Australia

Geelong

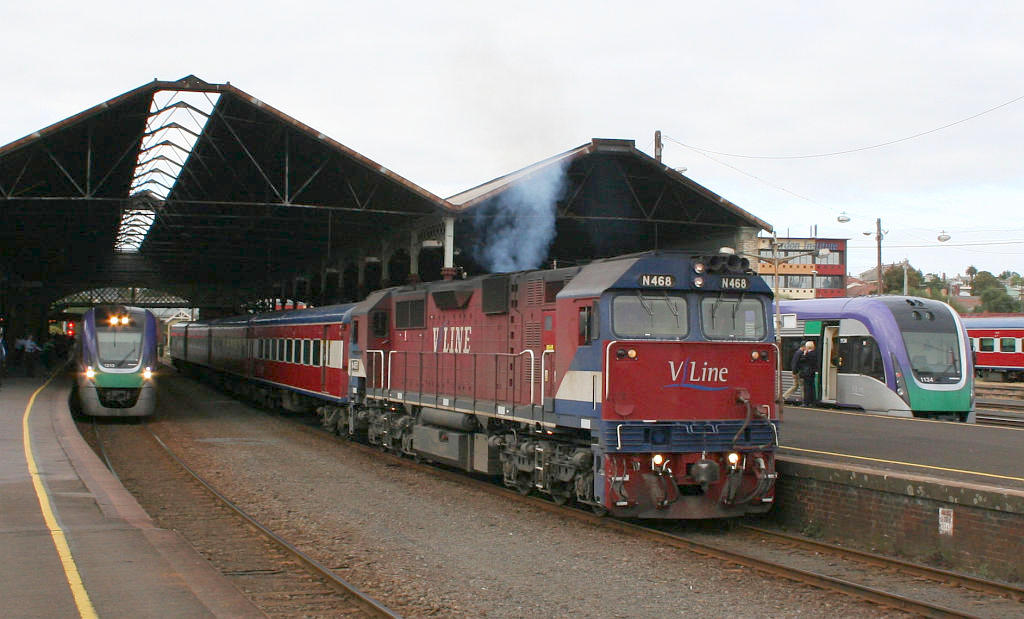
- V/Line trains at Geelong station, 2006

Overview
- Service type: Regional rail
- System: Victorian railway network
- Status: Operational
- Locale: Victoria, Australia
- Predecessor: Geelong Flier (1926–1927); The Flyer ^ (1927–c. 1967); The Flyer (c. 1967–?)^ outbound extended to Port Fairy
- First service: 25 June 1857; 169 years ago
- Current operator: V/Line
- Former operators: Geelong and Melbourne Railway (G&MR) (1857–1860); Victorian Railways (VR) (1860–1974); VR as VicRail (1974–1983); STA (V/Line) (1983–1989); PTC (V/Line) (1989–1995); PTC (V/Line Passenger) (1995–1998); V/Line Passenger (1998–2010)
- Ridership: 10.22 million (FY2023-2024)
- Website: V/Line Geelong on X

Route
- Termini: Southern Cross; Waurn Ponds
- Stops: 15
- Distance travelled: 93.0 km (57.8 mi)
- Average journey time: 1 hours 19 minutes
- Service frequency: Approx. every 20 minutes to Geelong Station lower frequency if travelling past Geelong Station
- Lines used: Deer Park–West Werribee, Warrnambool

Technical
- Rolling stock: VLocity
- Track gauge: 1,600 mm (5 ft 3 in)
- Track owner: VicTrack

The Geelong line is a regional passenger rail service operated by V/Line in Victoria, Australia. It serves 15 stations towards its terminus in Waurn Ponds, a southern suburb of Geelong, via the Regional Rail Link. It is the most used regional rail service in Victoria, carrying 10.22 million people in the 2023–2024 financial year.

Beyond Waurn Ponds, the service continues as the Warrnambool line to Warrnambool in the state's south-west.

== History ==
=== 19th and 20th centuries ===
The line to Geelong was originally built by the Geelong and Melbourne Railway Company and opened on 25 June 1857. The line was designed by English engineer Edward Snell, and originally built as a single-track railway.

The line was sold to the Victorian Railways in 1860. Following its sale, the line was progressively extended south-west, to Winchelsea in 1876, Colac in 1877, Camperdown in 1883, Terang in 1877, and lastly to Warrnambool, Dennington, and Port Fairy in 1890. The line is now closed beyond Warrnambool, with the last train leaving Port Fairy in September 1977.

In February 1959, the line from North Geelong to Corio was duplicated. Werribee to Little River was duplicated in October 1970, and Little River to Lara was duplicated in June 1981.

=== 21st century ===
There have long been calls to electrify the line, but plans were put on hold by the State Government in 2002, with diesel locomotives and railcars utilised instead.

==== Regional Fast Rail ====
Train services between Melbourne and Geelong received a package of upgrades under the Regional Fast Rail project, primarily focusing on upgrading the line to support 160 km/h running and the introduction of V/Line VLocity diesel multiple unit train sets. VLocity trains entered service on the line in 2006.

Construction of Waurn Ponds railway station was completed in 2014, with several Geelong line services being extended to terminate at Waurn Ponds.

==== Regional Rail Link ====
In the late 2000s and early 2010s, trains on the Geelong – Melbourne corridor were chronically late. As of March 2010, trains had officially run late for 44 consecutive months on the line. The poor performance of V/Line was well documented in the local Geelong press. Recurring issues on the line included poor communication, commuters worried about losing their jobs in Melbourne due to delays, and overcrowding.

In 2008 the Regional Rail Link project was announced, consisting of a new pair of tracks exclusively for V/Line services, avoiding the need to share tracks with Metro's electrified suburban services. The tracks begin west of Werribee, following an alignment up to Deer Park, then running into two new platforms at Southern Cross, completely bypassing Tottenham, West Footscray, Middle Footscray, South Kensington, and North Melbourne; but still stopping at Sunshine and Footscray at two platforms dedicated to V/Line services.

The main benefit of the project was for the Geelong line service, which used to run along the same tracks as Metro's Werribee line, resulting in significant congestion. Ballarat and especially Bendigo services benefited less, only being separated from Metro's Sunbury line service between Sunshine and Southern Cross. While the project was overall well-received for increasing service reliability, the choice to bypass North Melbourne was especially criticised.

The Regional Rail Link included two new stations to be served by Geelong V/Line trains: Tarneit and Wyndham Vale. Since its opening, overcrowding has become a persistent and chronic issue, especially at Tarneit, which is the most-used V/Line station other than Southern Cross.

==== Regional Rail Revival ====
The line received another significant package of works as part of the Regional Rail Revival project. Most notably, the line was duplicated from South Geelong to Waurn Ponds. To support this duplication, a new stabling facility was to be constructed at Waurn Ponds and three level crossings to be removed. These upgrades would allow 5 trains per hour during peak and 3 trains per hour off peak.

Between June and August 2024, the railway line was closed for duplication. The upgrades were completed on 26 August 2024, with new second platforms added to South Geelong and Marshall stations.

As of 1 December 2024, 68 new weekend services run to Waurn Ponds, 20 Wyndham Vale services have been extended to start/terminate at Waurn Ponds, 15 extra services a weekday "have been added" to Marshall station and 4 extra services per weekday "have been added" to Waurn Ponds station. all of which has been enabled by the duplication of the South Geelong to Waurn Ponds corridor.

== Network and operations ==
=== Services ===
The current V/Line timetable has services operating approximately every 20 minutes from Southern Cross to either South Geelong or Waurn Ponds.

Some peak hour services originate and terminate at Wyndham Vale, and also stops at West Tarneit and Tarneit stations. As a result, services to or from Geelong do not stop at these three stations.

The peak hours services to or from Geelong stops alternately at either Corio or North Shore. At other off-peak times, services stop alternately at either Corio or Little River.

All services run express through and do not stop at Ardeer, which is only served by Ballarat services.

Train services on the line are also subjected to maintenance and renewal works, usually on selected Fridays and Saturdays. Shuttle coach services are provided throughout the duration of works for affected commuters.

==== Stopping patterns ====
Legend — Station status

- ◼ Premium Station – Station staffed from first to last train
- ◻ Host Station – Usually staffed during morning peak, however this can vary for different stations on the network.

Legend — Stopping patterns

- ● – All trains stop
- ◐ – Some services do not stop
- ▲ – Only inbound trains stop
- ▼ – Only outbound trains stop
- | – Trains pass and do not stop

Geelong Services
Station	Local	Express	Marshall	South Geelong	Geelong	Wyndham Vale
◼ Southern Cross	●	●	●	●	●	●
◼ Footscray	●	●	●	●	●	●
◼ Sunshine	●	◐	●	●	◐	●
Deer Park	●	I	●	●	I	◐
◼ Tarneit	●	●	◐	●	◐	●
West Tarneit	●	I	◐	●	I	●
◼ Wyndham Vale	●	◐	●	●	◐	●
Little River	●	I	◐	◐	I	
◻ Lara	●	●	●	●	●	
Corio	●	I	◐	◐	●	
North Shore	●	I	●	●	◐	
◻ North Geelong	●	●	●	●	●	
◼ Geelong	●	●	●	●	●	
◼ South Geelong	●	●	●	●		
◻ Marshall	●	●	●			
◼ Waurn Ponds	●	●				

== Services ==
The current V/Line timetable has weekday services operating approximately every 20 minutes from Southern Cross to either South Geelong or Waurn Ponds in an alternating pattern. Some services originate and terminate at Wyndham Vale.

Weekday peak services towards Southern Cross typically originate at either South Geelong or Waurn Ponds in an alternating pattern, and most stop all stations.

Off-peak services to and from South Geelong usually run express through Corio, while off-peak services to and from Waurn Ponds run express through Little River.

Since 1 December 2024, weekend service frequency is approximately every 20 minutes, with all trains timetabled to originate and terminate at Waurn Ponds and alternating between stopping all stations except Little River and stopping all stations except Corio.

All Geelong services run express through Ardeer; it is only served by Ballarat services.

=== Rolling stock ===
All services are run using V/Line VLocity diesel multiple unit trains in either a 3- or 6-car configuration. Some services originating and terminating at Wyndham Vale are operated with a 9-car VLocity set. S type carriages were used until 2010 and H type carriages were used until 2024.

== Future ==
=== Electrification and quadruplication to Wyndham Vale ===
The 2018 Western Rail Plan identified a need to electrify the line up to Wyndham Vale, which would significantly resolve the overcrowding problem due to the fact Metro's trains can hold more people than V/Line's. The plan also featured quadruplication, avoiding the problem of a new electric service causing congestion for V/Line services along the corridor. In 2023, it was widely reported that track quadruplication was no longer part of the Western Rail Plan, and there is no concrete plan for electrification.

=== Geelong Fast Rail ===
Geelong services used to run on the same tracks as Metro's Werribee line until the Regional Rail Link was opened in 2015, diverting trains along a new alignment completely bypassing it. In 2020, the Geelong Fast Rail project was announced, which planned to reroute Geelong trains back to the Werribee corridor, this time with an express track exclusively for Geelong services between Werribee and Laverton, potentially reducing travel times by up to 15 minutes. In 2023, the Federal Government cut funding to various infrastructure projects, resulting in Geelong Fast Rail being shelved.

== Gallery ==
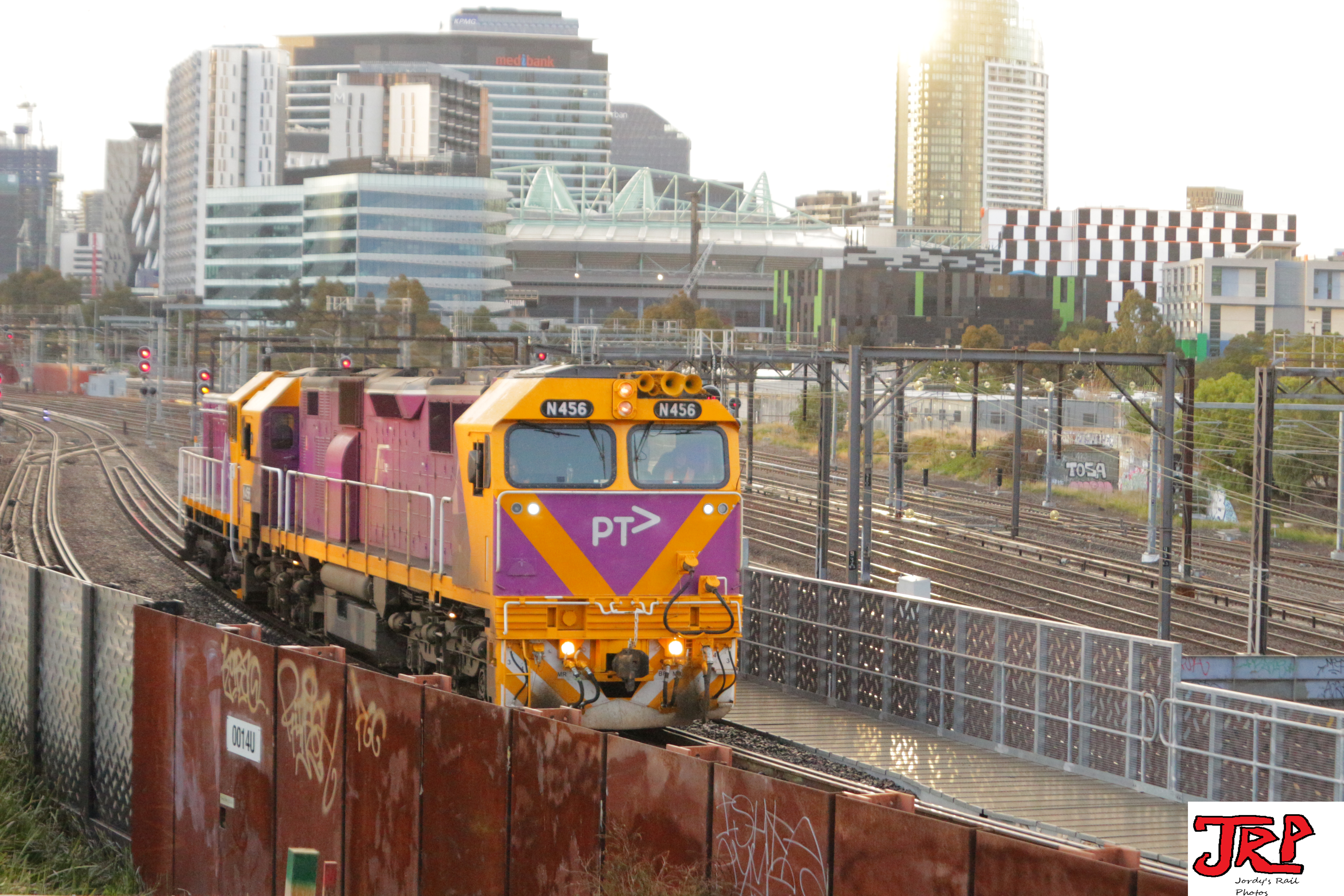
V/Line N class N456 running over the Regional Rail Link's elevated North Melbourne bypass

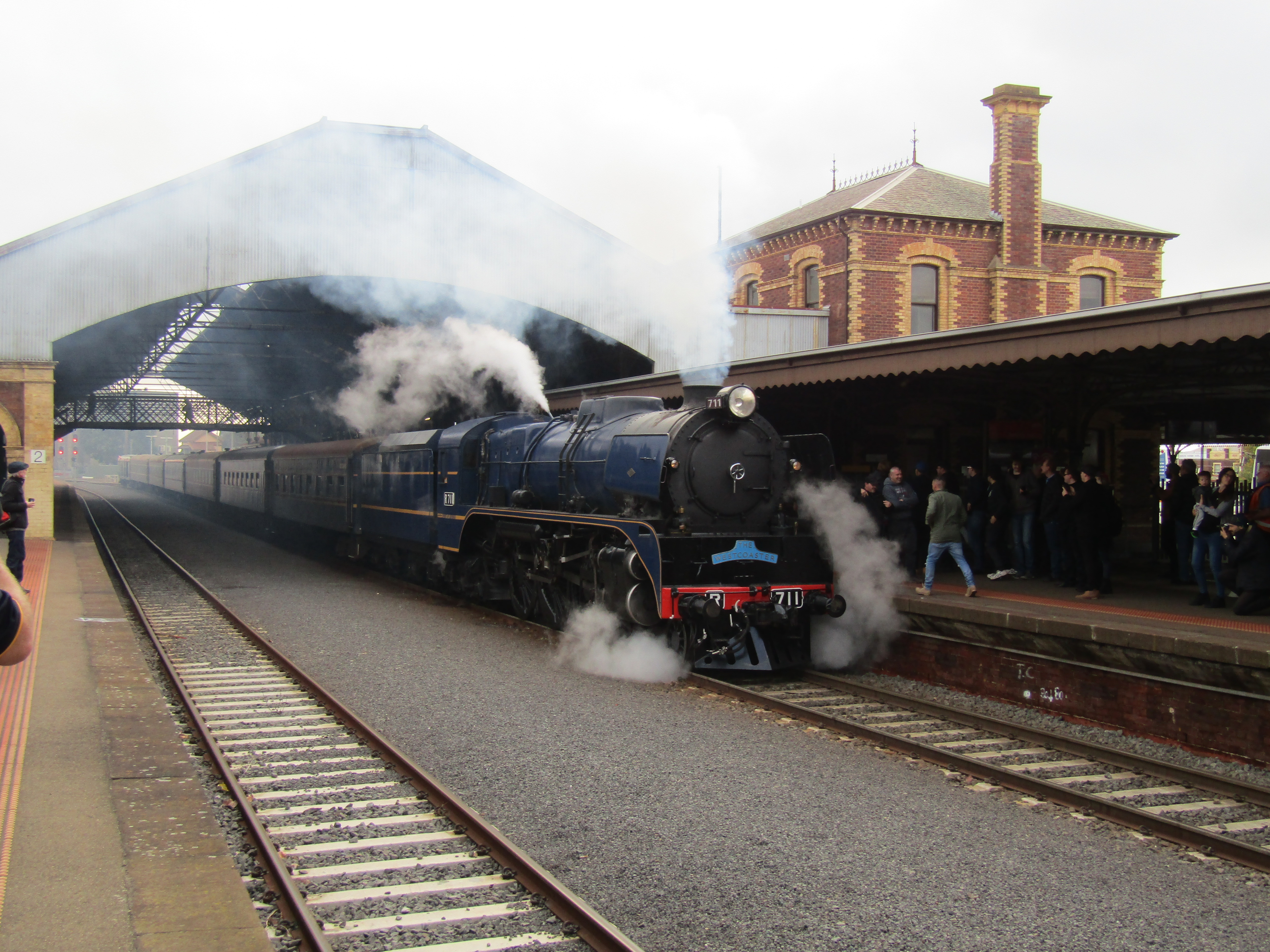
Victorian Railways R class steam train on a heritage tour at Geelong Station, run by volunteer group Steamrail Victoria

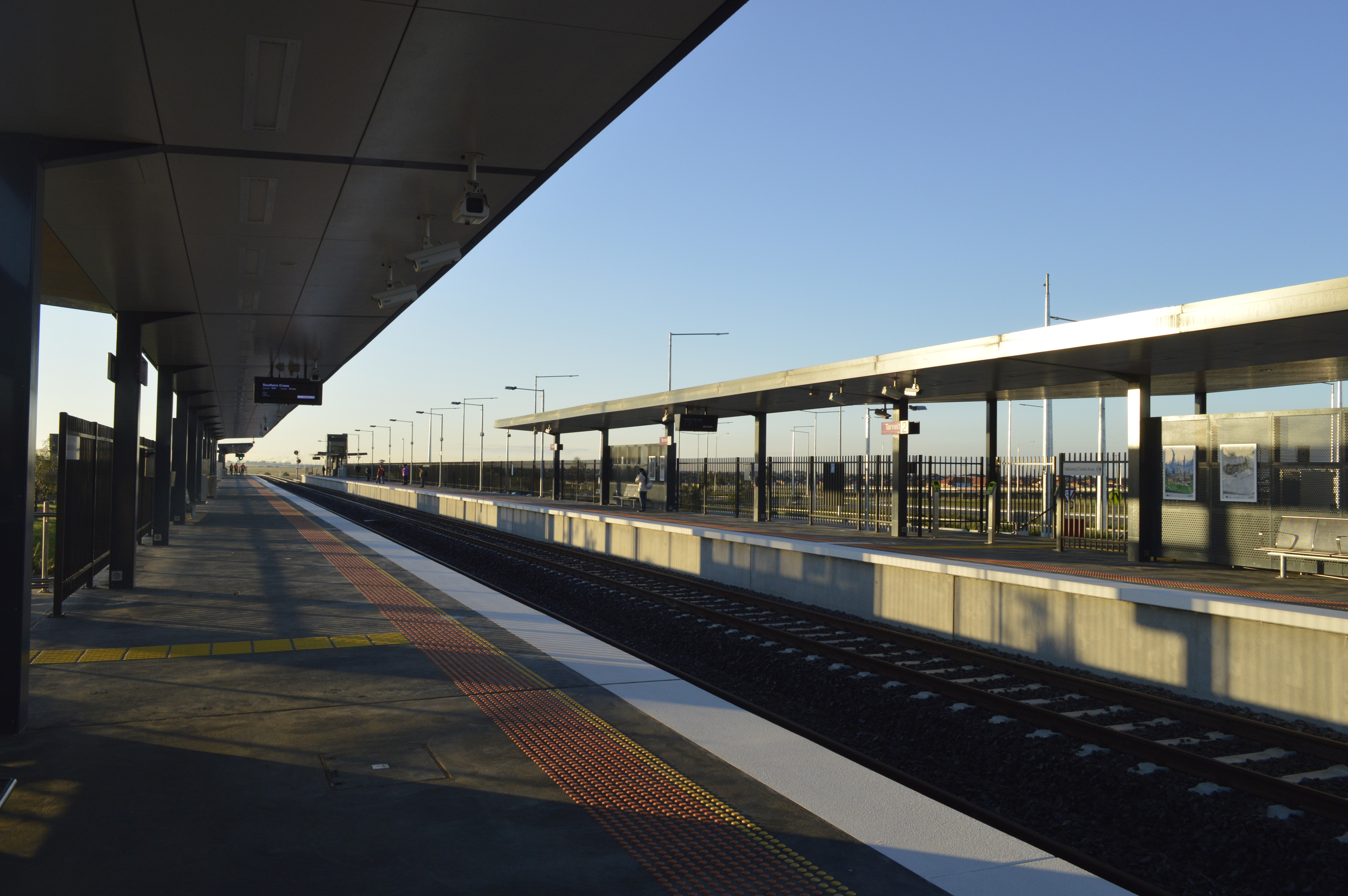
Platforms at Tarneit, 2015

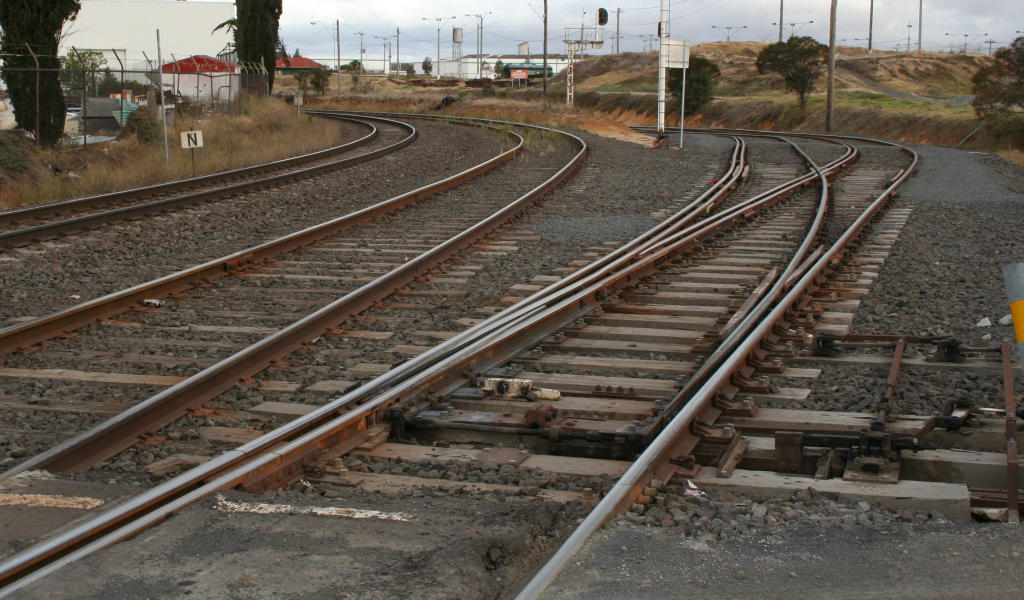
Dual-gauge track in North Geelong

== See also ==
- Geelong and Melbourne Railway Company
- V/Line
