= V/Line =

Australian regional rail company

V/Line Corporation

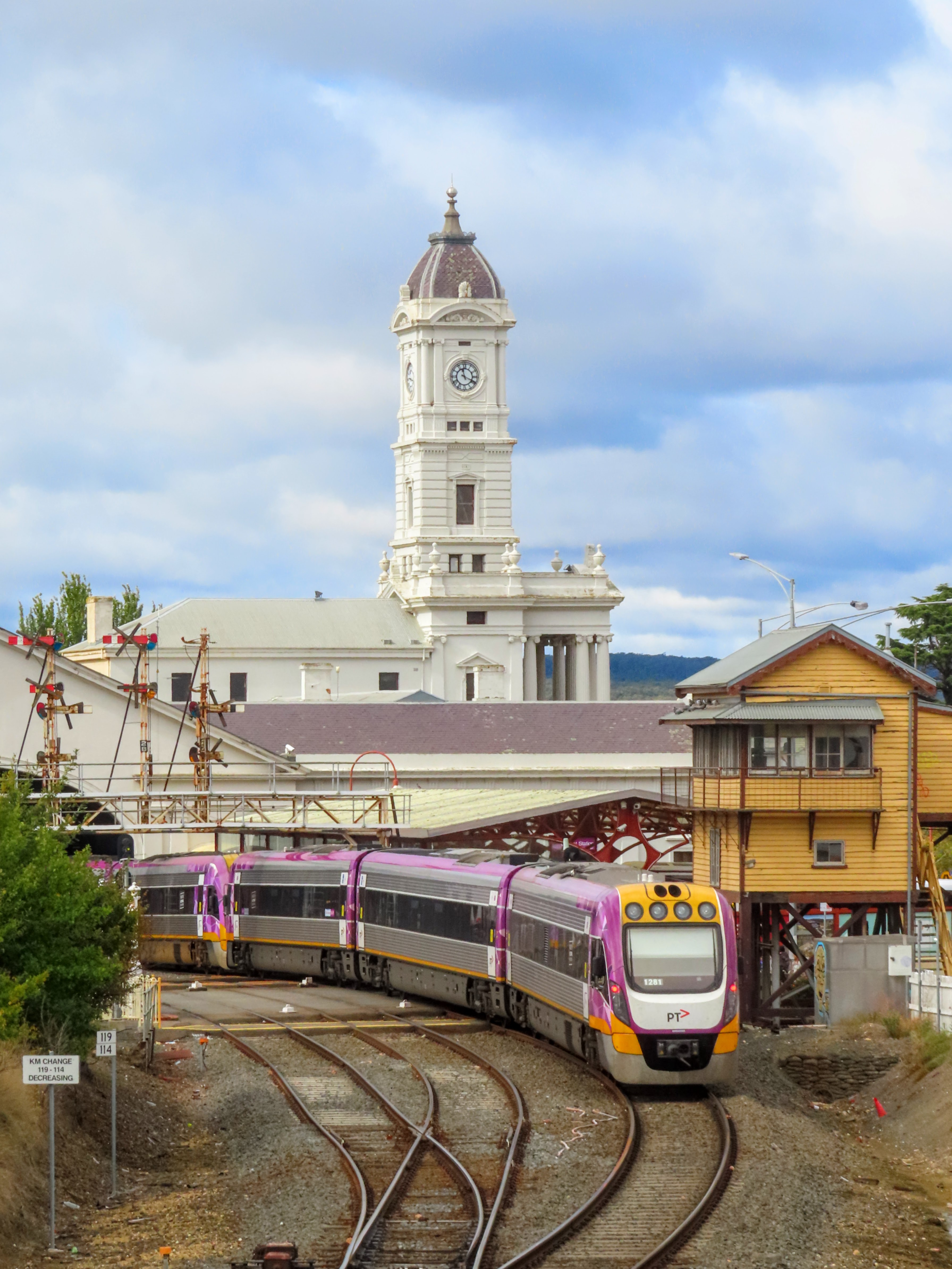
- A VLocity train at Ballarat station

Corporation overview
- Formed: 1 July 1983 (as State Transport Authority brand); 1 October 2003 (as statutory corporation)
- Preceding corporation: Victorian Railways
- Type: Statutory authority
- Employees: ▲2,419 (June 2022)
- Annual budget: AUD$1.2 billion (2021–22 income)
- Ministers responsible: Vicki Ward, Minister for Public and Active Transport; Jaclyn Symes, Treasurer
- Corporation executives: Howard Ronaldson, Chair; Matt Carrick, CEO
- Parent department: Department of Transport and Planning
- Parent agency: Transport for Victoria
- Key document: Transport Integration Act 2010
- Website: vline.com.au

- Victorian railway network in 2014

Overview
- Headquarters: Melbourne
- Locale: Victoria, Australia
- Predecessor: Victorian Railways; Public Transport Corporation

Technical
- Track gauge: 1,600 mm (5 ft 3 in); 1,435 mm (4 ft 8 1/2 in) standard gauge

V/Line is a statutory authority that operates regional passenger rail and coach services in the Australian state of Victoria. It provides passenger train services on five commuter routes and eight long-distance services from its major hub at Southern Cross railway station in Melbourne. It also provides coach bus services across Victoria and into New South Wales, the Australian Capital Territory and South Australia. In addition, V/Line is responsible for the maintenance of the Victorian freight and passenger rail network outside of the areas managed by Metro Trains Melbourne and the Australian Rail Track Corporation.

The V/Line brand was introduced after the split-up of VicRail in 1983, and has been used by all successive operators of the state's regional public transport network. Until 1999, when its freight operations were privatised, V/Line Freight was also a government provider of the state's rail freight services. From 2004 the main operating rail company V/Line Pty Ltd was owned by the V/Line Corporation, a Victorian state government statutory corporation. In 2016, V/Line Corporation became a subsidiary agency of Public Transport Victoria and in July 2021 V/Line transitioned from a government-owned corporation to a statutory authority.

In the 2023–24 financial year, V/Line carried 23.8 million passengers, mostly on its railway lines, which have experienced considerable patronage growth since 2005 due to improved services and population increases. The COVID-19 pandemic had a significant impact on usage, with patronage falling to 10.7 million passengers in 2021–22. V/Line's operations, particularly those on long-distance routes, remain heavily subsidised by the Victorian Government.

== History ==
=== As a government authority ===
On 1 July 1983, the State Transport Authority and a range of other transport bodies were created when the Transport Act 1983 came into effect. The new authority replaced VicRail and established the V/Line operating brand for both country passenger and freight. The VicRail orange and silver "teacup" livery used on passenger rolling stock was replaced in August 1983 by an orange and grey livery. The white and green V/Line logo was launched on 21 August 1983 by the transport minister, Steve Crabb, at Spencer Street station, with special trains running to Essendon to mark the occasion. This was altered on 1 July 1989 when the Transport (Amendment) Act took effect, merging the State Transport Authority with the Metropolitan Transit Authority to form the Public Transport Corporation (PTC). The relationship between the country V/Line and "The Met" suburban brands was blurred, with the Sprinter trains delivered in the 1993–1995 period appearing in PTC colours but with both PTC and V/Line logos.

On 30 April 1984, the first V/Line country coach service commenced with a daily Melbourne to Mildura service being introduced, replacing services formerly operated by Ansett Pioneer and Holidaymakers of Mildura. It was operated under contract by Holidaymakers and Mildura Bus Lines. On 2 December 1984, the Speedlink service was introduced. This involved a road coach operating from Adelaide via Albury where it connected with the State Rail Authority's Riverina XPT to Sydney.

Other new coach services introduced were Warrnambool to Mount Gambier on 19 November 1984, Lang Lang to Inverloch on 9 December 1984, Warrnambool to Ballarat on 3 June 1985, Albury to Mildura and Dandenong to Cowes both on 2 September 1985, and Cobram to Shepparton and Melbourne to Shepparton both on 27 October 1985.

On 27 April 1987, the Canberra Link coach service commenced. A Mylon Motorways coach for Canberra connected with a train service from Melbourne at Wodonga. On the same date a service commenced from Mildura to Broken Hill, connecting off The Sunraysia.

On 1 July 1994, the operation of some of V/Line's regional passenger services was contracted out to the private sector. Hoys Roadlines took over the Melbourne to Cobram service with trains operated under contract by V/Line to Shepparton with Hoys operating a road coach service beyond. The service from Melbourne to Warrnambool was operated by West Coast Railway who operated their own trains throughout. Both of these returned to being operated by V/Line in 2004.

Passenger rail services to Leongatha ceased on 24 July 1993, Bairnsdale, Cobram and Dimboola on 21 August 1993, Mildura on 13 September 1993 and Ararat on 27 May 1994.

In 1995, the freight and passenger rail divisions of V/Line were divided, with a new red, blue, and white livery for its passenger trains. This split was finalised on 1 July 1997 when separate management was brought in. On 1 July 1998, operation of the Stony Point line passed to Bayside Trains. V/Line continues to lend rolling stock to Metro Trains Melbourne to operate the service.

=== Privatisation ===
==== Freight Victoria ====
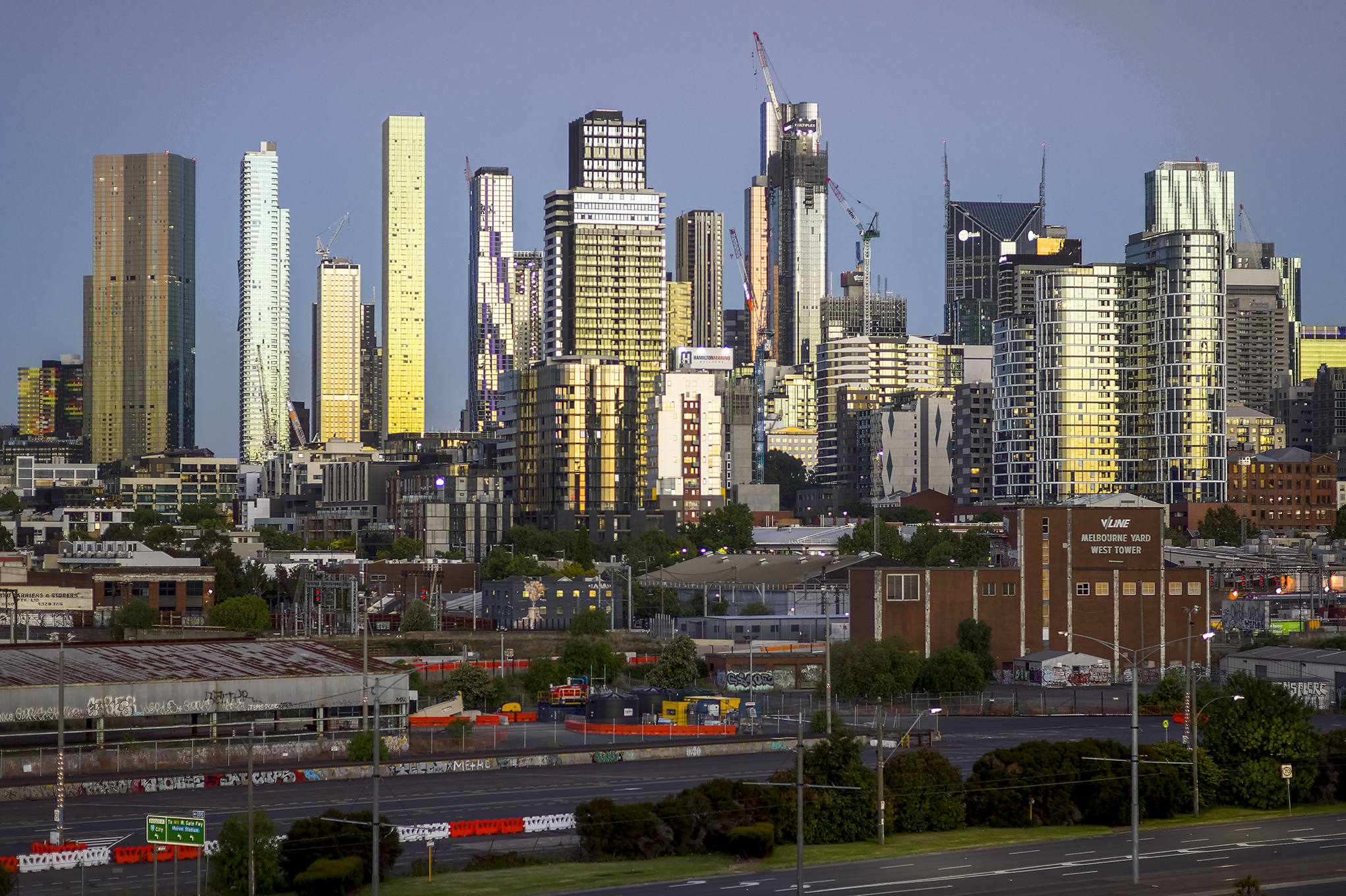
Melbourne Yard West Tower 2021

V/Line Freight was sold to a consortium of RailAmerica, Fluor Daniel, Macquarie Bank and A Goninan & Co and rebranded as Freight Victoria effective from 1 May 1999. The sale included a 45-year lease of most regional track (passenger and freight), with responsibilities for track, signalling and level crossings, with access to passenger sections of track granted to V/Line Passenger. The state government had not wanted to sell rights to the track infrastructure, but was persuaded by bids by three primarily American consortia which argued greater efficiencies could be accomplished by vertical integration. After being renamed Freight Australia in March 2000, it was sold to Pacific National in August 2004. In May 2007 Pacific National sold the rail lease of the network back to VicTrack.

==== National Express ====
On 29 August 1999, National Express took control of V/Line Passenger, having won a 10-year concession in competition with FirstGroup, Freight Victoria, GB Railways, Prism Rail and Stagecoach. National Express also operated the M>Tram and M>Train franchises in Melbourne. It included all country rail operations in Victoria, with the exception of the Shepparton and Warrnambool services previously franchised in 1993.

National Express inherited a fleet of A, N, P and Y class locomotives, H, N, S and Z type carriages and Sprinter diesel railcars. As part of the franchise commitment, 29 two-car VLocitys were ordered from Bombardier.

In December 2002, National Express handed in its Victorian rail and tram franchises having been unable to renegotiate financial terms with the state government. KPMG were appointed to operate the business on behalf of the State Government.

=== As a statutory corporation ===
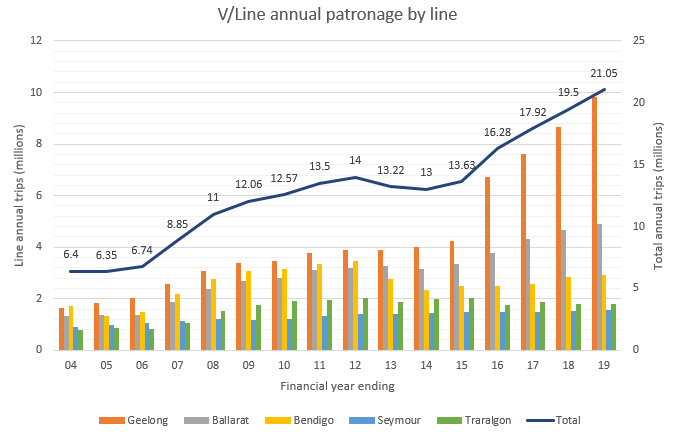
Patronage of V/Line rail services 2004–19

Full control of V/Line was taken on 1 October 2003 by changing the shareholding of V/Line, making the government the sole shareholder via a recently created statutory corporation, V/Line Passenger Corporation. V/Line operates under a franchise agreement entered into with the Director of Public Transport. The Director also sub leases tracks and other infrastructure which the Director holds under lease from VicTrack, the agency which owns Victoria's rail-related land and infrastructure.

In 2000, the Regional Fast Rail project was launched to upgrade the tracks linking Ballarat, Bendigo, Geelong and the Latrobe Valley to Melbourne. The project, which also included an extra 10 Vlocitys and an expanded timetable of rail services, commenced full operations from December 2005.

Service to Bairnsdale and Ararat was restored in May and July 2004 respectively. In December 2008, as part of the Victorian Transport Plan, the state government announced that V/Line rail passenger services would be extended from Ballarat to Maryborough at a cost of $50 million, commencing in July 2010. The first passenger train in 15 years arrived at Maryborough on 24 July 2010. V/Line also resumed operating the Shepparton and Warrnambool services in 2004 when contacts with Hoys Roadliners and West Coast Railway expired.

In November 2006, Pacific National, which had purchased Freight Australia, entered into an agreement to sell the remainder of its Victorian rail lease of the network back to VicTrack. The sale was completed on 7 May 2007, with V/Line becoming the track manager of the Victorian intrastate network.

In May 2008, it was announced that part of the V/Line fleet would be converted to standard gauge to operate an upgraded Albury line service. In December 2008 V/Line ended the sale of alcoholic beverages aboard long-distance trains, after almost a century of the practice.

In 2015/16, the subsidy per passenger trip was $22.12.

The Transport Integration Act 2010 renamed the V/Line Passenger Corporation as V/Line Corporation. The Act also gave V/Line a new statutory charter. As part of these changes, the corporation's responsibilities were explicitly expanded to cover both rail passenger and rail freight services. The Act received the Royal assent on 2 March 2010 and came into effect on 1 July 2010.

=== Regional Rail Revival ===
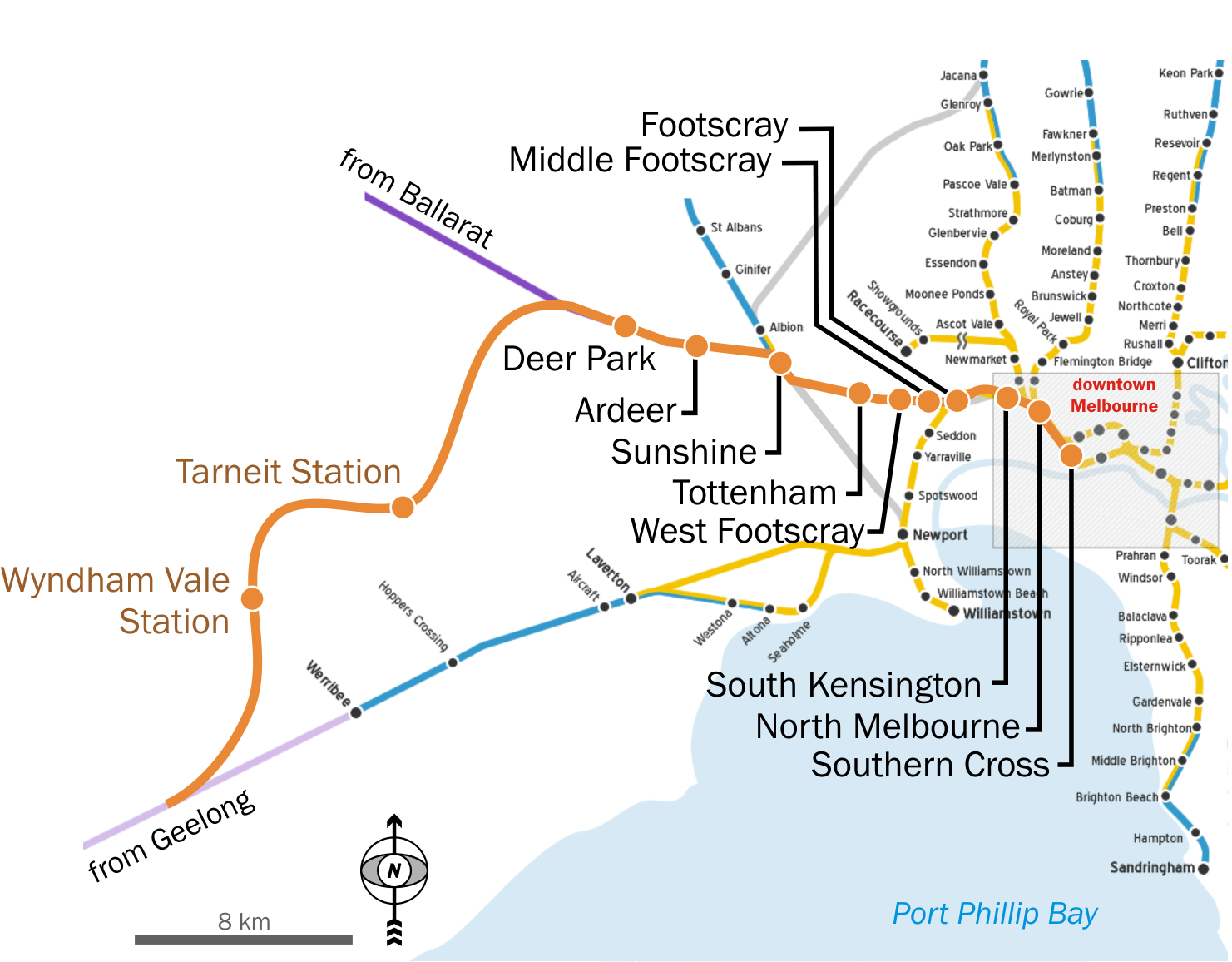
Map of the Regional Rail Link corridor through Melbourne's west, which opened in 2015.

In the late 2010s and early 2020s, the V/Line network underwent one of the largest periods of expansion and upgrade in its history. In 2009, work began on the Regional Rail Link project, a 47.5-kilometre (29.5 mi) new double-track railway through Melbourne's western suburbs designed to separate V/Line and Metro trains and create a new corridor for Geelong corridor trains. Largely funded by the federal Rudd Government in 2009, the project was originally budgeted at $4.32 billion but had a final cost of $3.65 billion. When it opened in 2015, the Deer Park–West Werribee railway line added new V/Line stations in Melbourne's west at Tarneit and Wyndham Vale, enabling higher frequencies and expanding V/Line's role as a commuter railway service.

Patronage had been steadily increasing on the V/Line network, growing by 83% between 2006/07 and 2015/16, from 8.9 million to 16.3 million. The Victorian Auditor General found that by 2017 the Regional Rail Link had led to an 80% increase in patronage on the Geelong line.

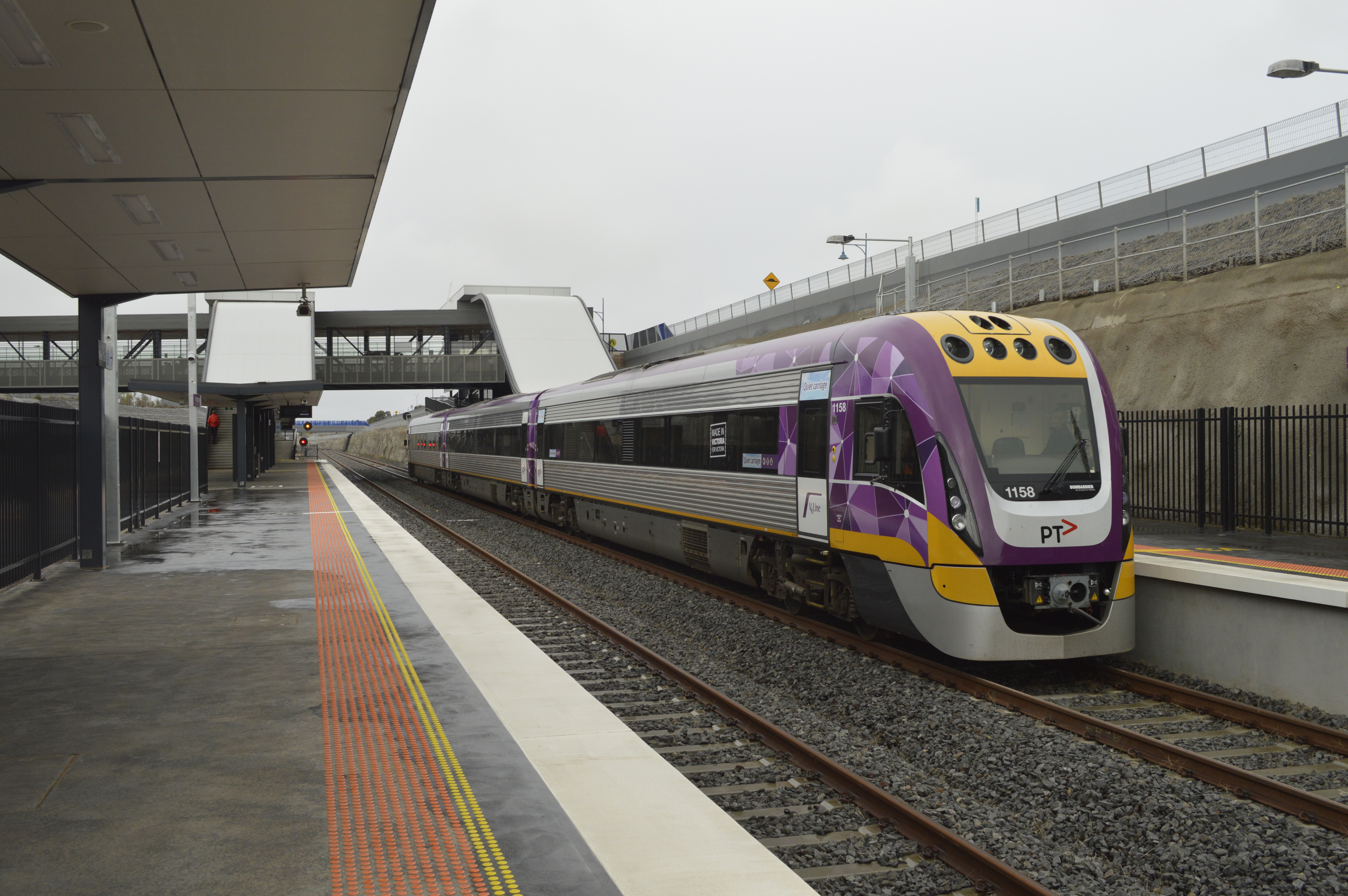
A VLocity train at Wyndham Vale station in Melbourne's west, which opened in 2015 as part of the Regional Rail Link.

In January 2016, V/Line's VLocity rolling stock was identified as suffering from abnormal wheel wear. The fleet was also banned from the metropolitan track lease by the suburban rail operator, Metro Trains Melbourne, after a V/Line train failed to activate a level crossing in Dandenong. The two problems caused as many as 70 services a day to be cancelled. This also led to the resignation of then CEO Theo Taifalos, 16 days of free travel being provided to Victorians, and an inquiry being ordered by the public transport minister into V/Line's operational capacity. It was later identified that the wheel wear was caused by harsh curves in track segments, particularly along the Dynon-North Melbourne flyover, which was rebuilt as part of the Regional Rail Link. As a result, the flyover track segment was replaced, and permanent 30 km/h (18.6 mph) speed restrictions were introduced from the flyover to South Kensington.

In 2017, the state government under premier Daniel Andrews initiated work on the Regional Rail Revival program, a $4 billion project to upgrade Victoria's regional railways and provide more reliable and frequent passenger services. The program was co-funded by the Federal Government, through the Commonwealth's asset-recycling fund. The project reflected the upgrades outlined in the 2016 Regional Network Development Plan.

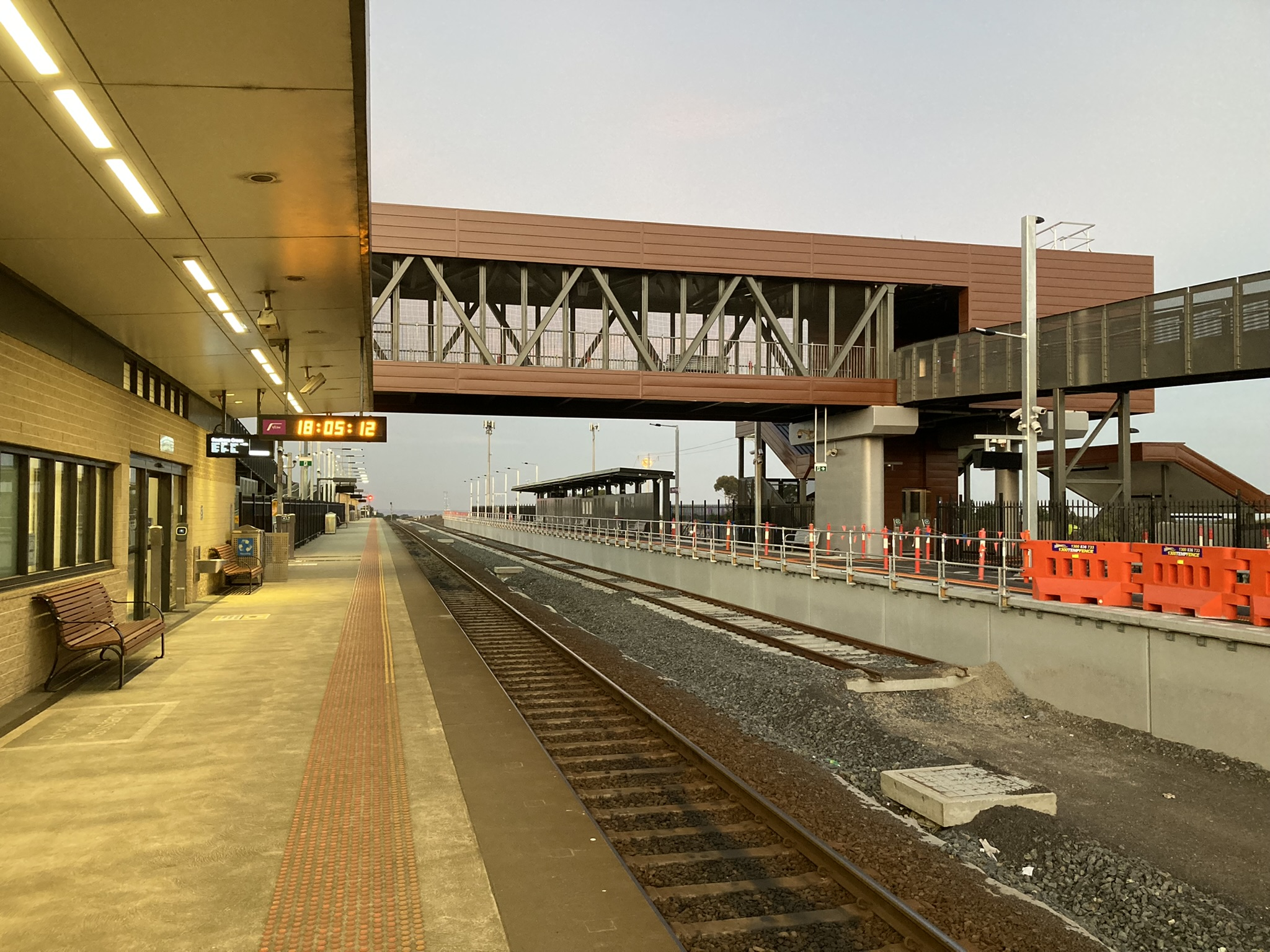
Regional Rail Revival upgrades at Waurn Ponds station near Geelong during construction, April 2022

The project involved upgrades to all of the state's regional rail corridors. The project allocated $518 million for upgrades to the Ballarat line, including 18 km (11.2 mi) of duplicated track between Deer Park West and Melton stations, new passing loops, new train stabling, upgraded stations and more car parking along the corridor. A new platform and track was added to Waurn Ponds station on the Geelong line and a rail line to Armstrong Creek was investigated. The Gippsland line will have its signalling upgraded, some track duplicated, a new stabling facility built and platforms added to some stations. The North East, Shepparton and Warrnambool lines were upgraded to allow VLocity trains to run on those corridors.

The project will also include track speed and signalling upgrades to the Bendigo-Echuca line. Secondary stages of upgrades were launched on many lines, allowing more services to be added. A new rail bridge was built over the Avon River in Gippsland as part of the project. New stations were built at Goornong, Huntly and Raywood on the Bendigo line as part of the Bendigo Metro project, which aimed to improve the commuter service for greater Bendigo. A new Cobblebank station east of Melton was opened in 2019.

Over this time, the VLocity became the primary rollingstock servicing the V/Line network, with 105 three-car sets in service as of 2023. VLocity trains were introduced to a standard gauge line for the first time in July 2022 after upgrades to the Seymour and Albury lines as part of the Regional Rail Revival. During the 2022 state election, the Andrews government promised to purchase a further 23 three-car sets for the network. The government also announced new stations for the Regional Rail Link at Truganina and Tarneit West, and the removal of four more level crossings on the Ballarat line around Melton, which would make the line level-crossing free between the city and Melton.

In the 2023/24 Victorian Budget, 23 new 3-car VLocity trains were ordered as part a $601 million investment in order to replace ageing Classic Fleet trains, boosting Victoria's VLocity fleet to 141 trains once construction is completed.

On 1 July 2021, V/Line transitioned from a state-owned corporation to a statutory authority.

== Services ==
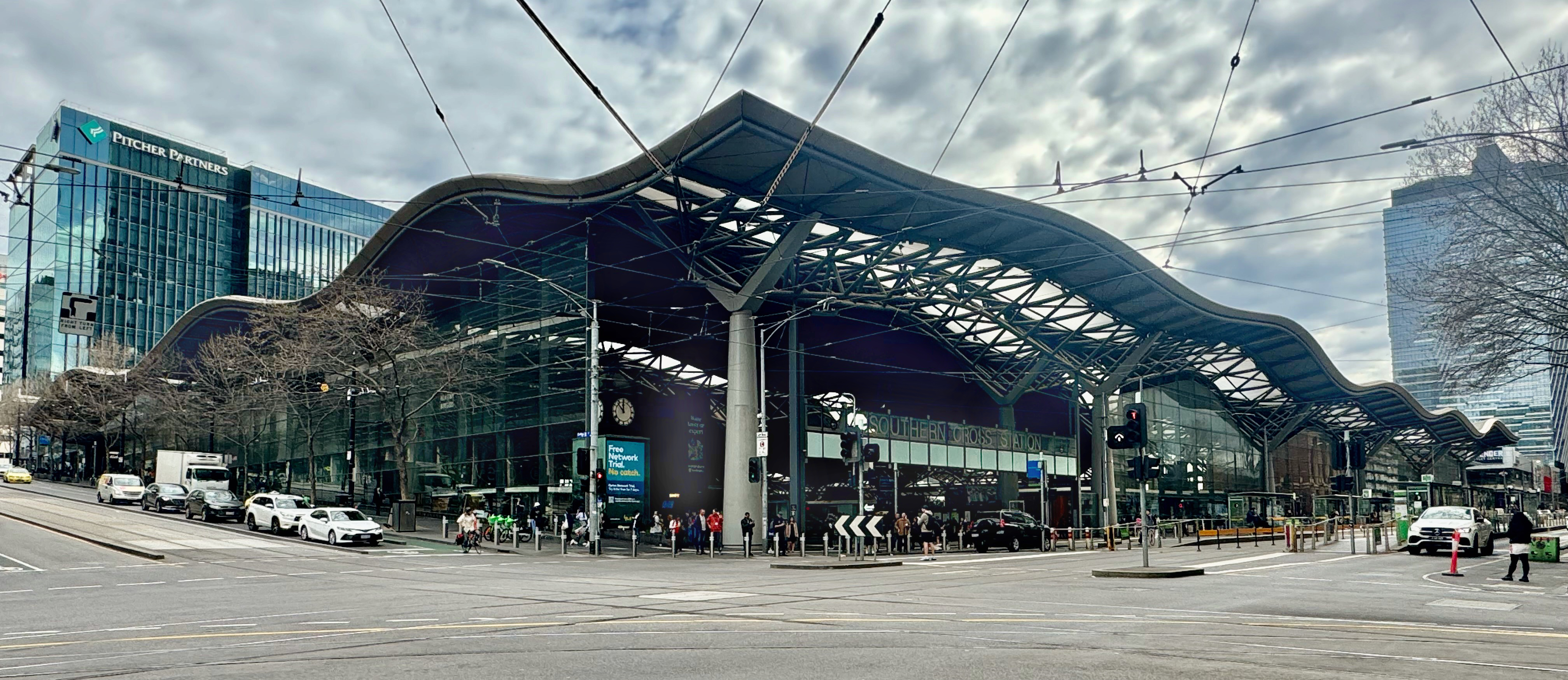
Southern Cross railway station from the corner of Collins and Spencer Streets

V/Line operates rail services to the regional cities of Albury, Ararat, Bairnsdale, Ballarat, Bendigo, Echuca, Geelong, Maryborough, Seymour, Shepparton, Swan Hill, Traralgon and Warrnambool. In addition, V/Line operates coach services to towns located beyond the passenger rail network.

Rail services are grouped into two types. As part of the introduction of the Myki smartcard in 2013, and to provide consistent communication to both staff and customers, what were formerly called "interurban" services became "commuter" services, and what were formerly called "intercity" services became "long distance" services. Commuter services operate over shorter distances and significantly more frequently than long-distance services, and use two different ticketing systems. Commuter services use the Myki, whilst long distance services require printed paper tickets.

All rail services depart from Southern Cross station in Melbourne.

Rail services operated by V/Line:

- Eastern Region or Traralgon line, which continues as the Bairnsdale line.
- North East Region or Seymour line, which continues as the Albury line and the Shepparton line.
- Northern Region or Bendigo line, which continues as the Echuca line and the Swan Hill line.
- South West Region or Geelong line, which continues as the Warrnambool line.
- Western Region or Ballarat line, which continues as the Ararat line and the Maryborough line.

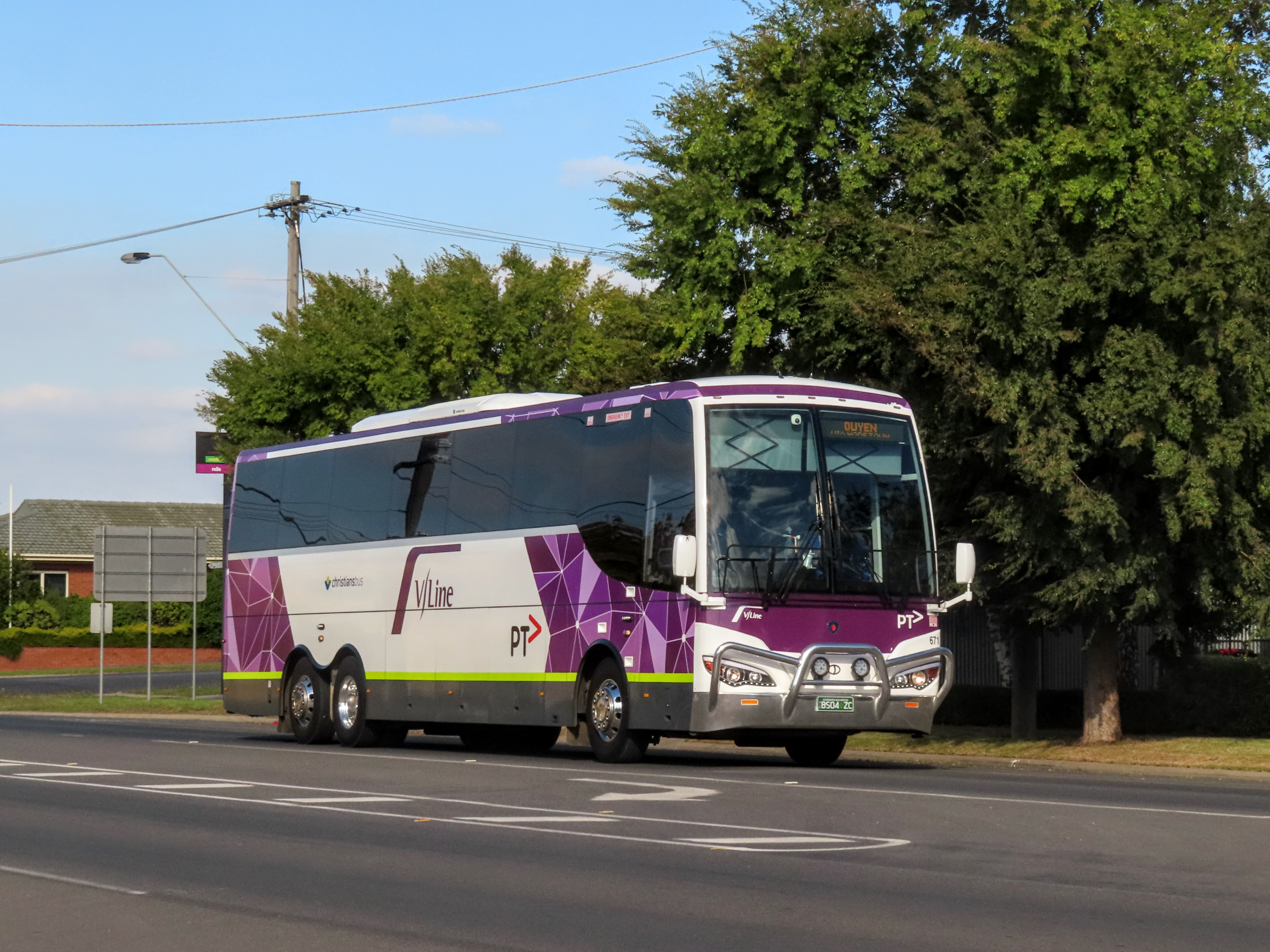
Christians Bus 671 departing Ararat on a V/Line service

Coach services operated by V/Line:

- Canberra Link – Melbourne (Southern Cross) to Canberra via Wodonga, runs as a train to Albury and then a coach to Canberra.
- Capital Link – Melbourne (Southern Cross) to Canberra via Bairnsdale, runs as a train to Bairnsdale and then a coach to Canberra.
- Daylink – Melbourne (Southern Cross) to Adelaide via Bendigo, runs as a train to Bendigo and then a coach to Adelaide 6 days a week and as a coach the whole way on Sunday.
- Sapphire Coast Link – Melbourne (Southern Cross) to Batemans Bay via Bairnsdale, runs as a train to Bairnsdale and then a coach to Batemans Bay.
- Speedlink – Sydney to Adelaide via Albury. This operates as the NSW TrainLink XPT train from Sydney to Albury with a V/Line coach operating from Albury to Adelaide.
- Murraylink – Mildura to Albury, does not travel to Melbourne and operates entirely as a coach.

== Fares ==
Tickets have the origin and destination printed upon them, making them point to point, but the fare itself is based on charging zones. Changes had been made to the fare system, to integrate it with the suburban Metcard system in preparation for the introduction of the Myki smartcard system to cover the entire state.

Until the introduction of the fare cap in March 2023, a single V/line economy fare could range up to $68.60 (March 2023 cost), and $137.20 for a daily economy fare. A limited number of V/Line services also had first class seating which required the payment of an upgrade fee (up to $8.60 in March 2023) on top of the standard economy fare. During the 2022 state election, the Victorian government promised to cap all V/Line fares to $9.20 for daily travel and $4.60 for concession card holders, regardless of distance travelled. This would make V/Line fares cost the same as a daily fare for travel with Metropolitan Melbourne, and represented the largest cut in fares in the system's history. The differentiation between economy class and first class seating, as well as the upgrade fee for first class seating, would also be abolished. A daily peak fare from Bendigo would be cut from $68.80 to $9.20, while Ballarat would be cut from $45.60 and Geelong from $27.60. An overnight trip to Swan Hill would be cut from a total cost of $92 to $18.40, as it requires two daily fares.

In early 2023, the state government announced the changes would take effect on 31 March 2023. The weekend and public holiday daily cap of $6.70 also took effect. However, the fare cap only applied to travel within the state and to interstate within 60 km (37 mi) from the Victorian border. Single fares for interstate travel further than 60 km (37 mi) from the border were still reduced, with a daily interstate surcharge of $21.80 applied to a single daily fare, for a reduced maximum total daily fare of $31.

Concerns were raised by public transport advocates that the system would struggle to cope with the expected increase in patronage from the fare cap, particularly during off-peak times and weekends. During the election the government promised an extra 23 new VLocity trains and an increase in weekend V/Line frequencies, but these were not expected until 2024. In the first week of the new fare system, the V/Line network carried 420,000 passengers.

As of 1 January 2024, the daily fare cap is $10.60, $5.30 for concession card holders, and the weekend and public holiday cap is $7.20. The daily interstate surcharge for interstate travel further than 60 km (37 mi) from the Victorian border is $24.60, for a maximum total of $35.20 for a single daily fare.

== Tickets ==
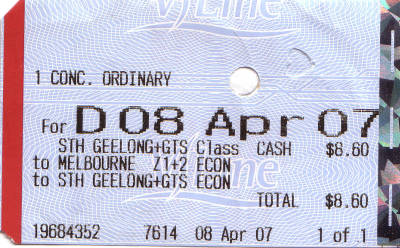
V/Line thermally printed ticket

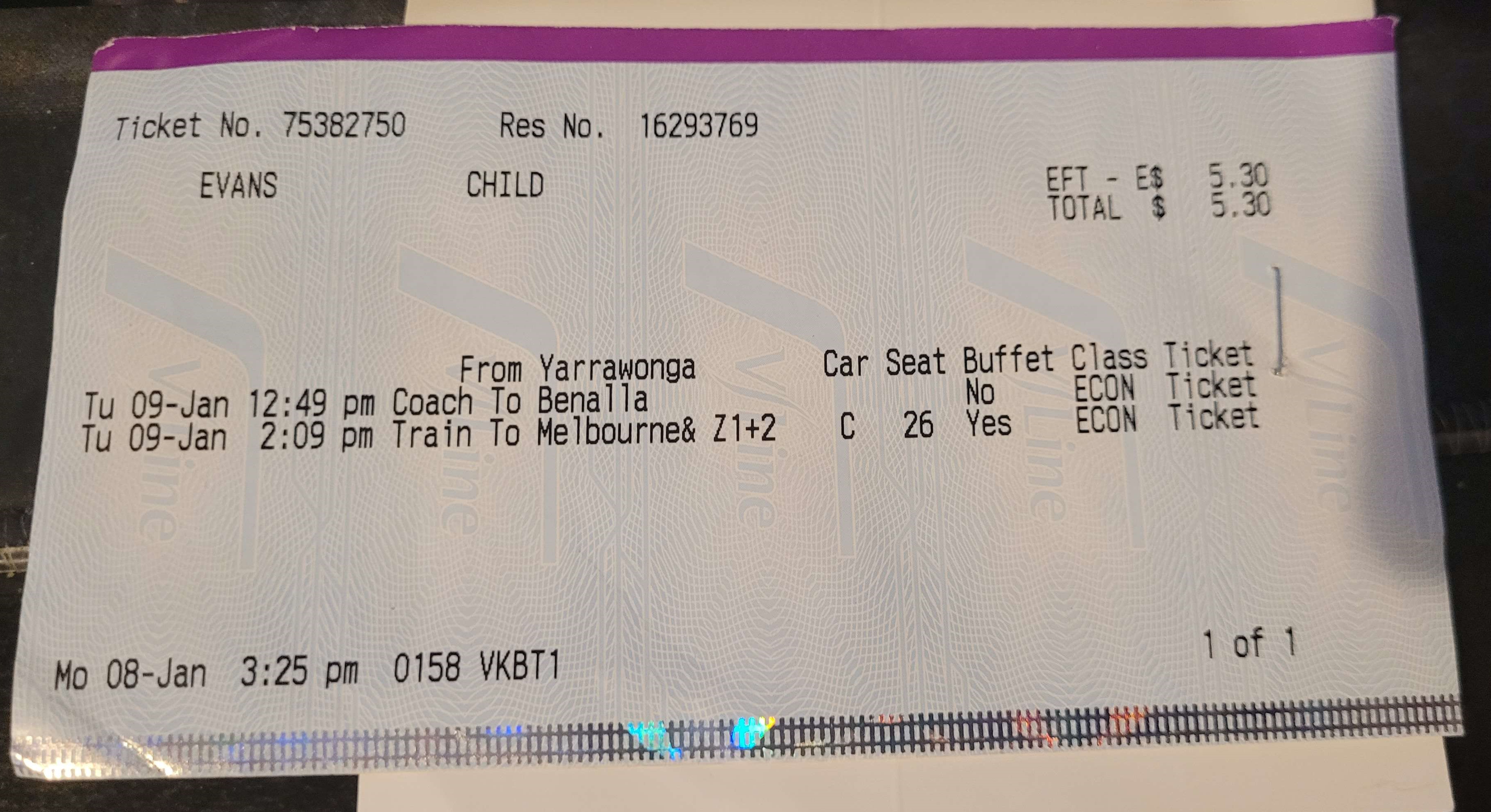
V/Line reserved seating ticket

V/Line currently uses the myki electronic ticketing system on its commuter train services, in addition to printed paper tickets, issued from staffed V/Line stations, selected Metro suburban premium stations, V/Line ticket agents, online or by phone. Passengers boarding services at unstaffed stations or coach stops can purchase tickets from the train conductor or coach driver. V/Line also offers eTickets which can be bought online and can be used in place of paper tickets.

Ticket types available include single, return and various periodical tickets. Until 2023, services used to be classified as peak and off-peak, with discounts available for tickets valid in off-peak times only. From June 2013, the myki smartcard system began to be rolled out on the V/Line network. As of November 2023, myki ticketing is only used between Melbourne and the following stations: Waurn Ponds (in Geelong), Wendouree (in Ballarat), Raywood and Goornong (in Bendigo), Traralgon and Seymour. Further out, paper tickets are still required. A paper ticket that costs at least the daily cap ($10.60 on weekdays and $7.20 on weekends and public holidays, as of 1 January 2024) also allows additional travel in the myki network on the same day without using a myki card.

Most V/Line services operate on a non-allocated seating basis, but most intercity (long-distance) rail services and some coach services require seat reservations.

== Rolling stock ==
=== Diesel multiple units and railcars ===
Class	Image	Type	Gauge	Top speed (km/h)	Built	Number	Notes
VLocity		DMU	Broad, standard	210 (designed) 160 (service)	2004–2026	424 carriages built (plus scrapped carriage No.1129) (141 3-car sets), 423 carriages in service (141 3-car sets)	Last set entered service August 2026.
Sprinter		Diesel railcar	Broad	130	1993–1995	21	Original fleet of 22 units (Sprinter unit 7019 scrapped, accident damaged).

=== Locomotives ===
Class	Image	Type	Gauge	Top speed (km/h)	Built	Number	Notes
N class		Diesel-electric	Broad, standard	130	1985–1987	25	Four locomotives leased to Southern Shorthaul Railroad in February 2024. Six additional locomotives leased to Southern Shorthaul Railroad in March 2025.
Y class		Diesel-electric	Broad	65	1965–1968	2	Shunters at Southern Cross, Bogies and traction motors reused from scrapped Swing Door suburban EMUs.

=== Carriages and vans ===
Class	Image	Type	Gauge	Top speed (km/h)	Built	Number	Notes
N type carriages		Passenger carriage	Broad, standard	115	1981–1984	12	4 sets, 1 car scrapped (accident damage), several passed on to heritage operators.
Z type carriages		Passenger carriage	Broad	115	1957–1966	8	Upgraded and incorporated into N sets, several passed on to heritage operators.
PH van		Head end power van	Broad	115	1984, 2009	3	Rebuilt from D vans, one van acquired by Steamranger in 2024.

=== Former rolling stock ===
Class	Image	Type	Gauge	Top speed (km/h)	Built	Number	Notes
A class		Diesel-electric	Broad	133	1984–1985	11	Rebuilt from VR B classes. 7 locomotives passed to Freight Victoria in 1999. six scrapped, three in preservation, 1 acquired by Southern Shorthaul Railroad and 1 locomotive (A66) still with V/Line.
B class		Diesel-electric	Broad, standard	133	1952–1953	26	First mainline diesel locomotive in Victoria. 11 rebuilt into A class, others progressively withdrawn beginning 1982 under Victorian Railways and continuing under V/Line.
C class		Diesel-electric	Broad, standard	133	1977–1978	10	Built for heavy interstate freight. Passed to National Rail in 1995.
G class		Diesel-electric	Broad, standard	115	1984–1989	33	Built to modernize Victorian mainline fright. All sold to Freight Victoria in 1999.
H class		Diesel-electric	Broad	100	1968–1969	5	Built for use in the Melbourne Hump Yard, modified version of T class with ballast weight and low speed equipment. Included in sale of V/Line Freight to Freight Victoria in 1999.
P class		Diesel-electric	Broad, standard	100	1984–1985	13	Rebuilt from VR T classes. 5 locomotives passed to Freight Victoria in 1999. Withdrawal begun in 2017 and one is in preservation. In 2019 Southern Shorthaul Railroad acquired 5 locomotives, acquiring a further 2 in 2024. 707 Operations acquired the last V/Line P class in November 2024.
S class		Diesel-electric	Broad, standard	133	1957–1961	16	Withdrawn beginning 1985. Six in preservation. S302 brought back upon WCR folding in 2004, used for Warrnambool services until it was withdrawn again in 2006.
T class		Diesel-electric	Broad, standard	100	1955–1968	94	Built for branch line services. Withdrawn from the late 1980s.
X class		Diesel-electric	Broad, standard	133	1966–1976	24	Nominally a freight locomotive, though was sometimes used on passenger workings prior to the creation of V/Line Freight. Passed to Freight Victoria in 1999.
DERM		Petrol, later diesel	Broad	100	1928–1931	10	Converted from Petrol to Diesel Electric Railmotors. Withdrawn in 1991.
DRC		Diesel	Broad	112	1971–1973	4	Built to replace the Walker Railmotors, Fleet Withdrawn on July 2nd 1994, now replaced by Sprinters.
H type carriages		Passenger carriage	Broad	115	1984–1990	59	Rebuilt from Harris EMUs (built 1956–1970). Final service ran in February 2024, now replaced by V/Line VLocity DMUs.
S type carriages		Passenger carriage	Broad	115	1937–1956	36	Some sold to West Coast Railway in 1995. Last carriages withdrawn in 2010.
D van		Parcels / luggage van	Broad	115	1983	7	All were withdrawn from service and scrapped in 2025.
PCJ van		Head end power / luggage van	Standard	115	1970	3	Withdrawn from service in 2022. All passed onto preservation groups.

=== Coaches ===
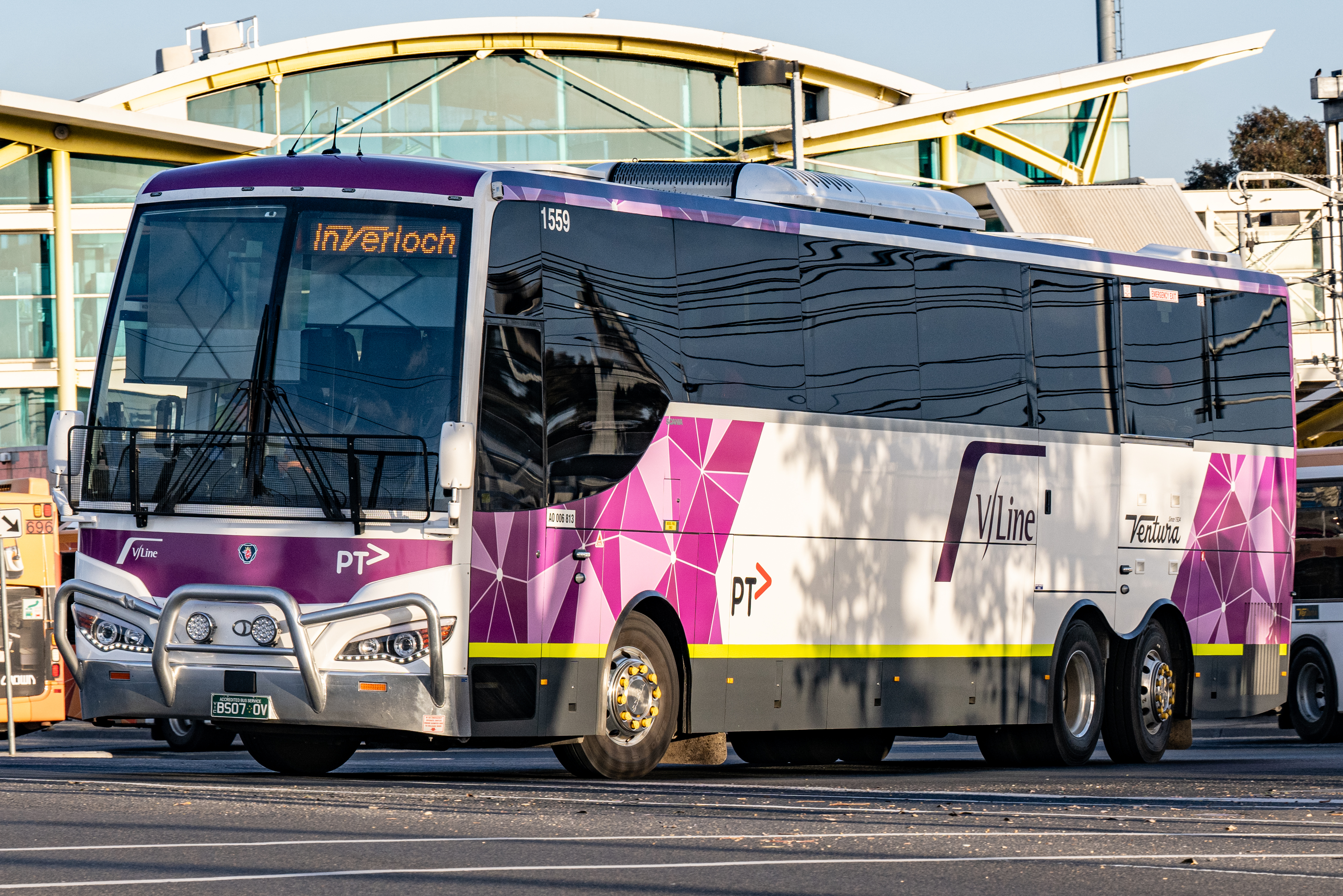
V/Line liveried coach

Coach services are provided by 23 private companies including BusBiz, Dineen Group, Donric Group, Dysons, Firefly Express, Mee's Bus Lines, Panorama Coaches and Ventura Bus Lines, which are contracted by Public Transport Victoria to operate services for V/Line. These coaches are painted in V/Line livery.

== Network access ==
V/Line is also responsible for managing and maintaining all non-interstate rural rail track in Victoria, including lines that do not see any passenger services.

== Branding ==
Initial 1983 logo

The initial V/Line visual identity was unveiled in August 1983, with an orange and grey livery for locomotives and passenger rolling stock, along with a white and green V/Line logo with a "stylised capital lettered logo with the V and the L split by a deep slashing stroke". Work on the initial V/Line identity started in May 1983, with freight wagons being released without logos pending the launch. Before that time, a stylised VR logo was carried by rolling stock that had been received the orange and silver VicRail "teacup" livery since 1981. Carriages in the 'teacup' livery later had the logos removed and replaced by V/Line ones.

This remained until 1993 when the Sprinter railcars were delivered in the teal and yellow suburban 'The Met' brand colours, but with both The Met and V/Line logos. In 1995, the freight and passenger rail divisions of V/Line were divided, with locomotives in the freight fleet retaining the orange and grey livery with 'V/Line Freight' logos, while passenger carriages and locomotive received the red blue and white 'V/Line Passenger' livery which remains on some of the fleet today. It was also at that time that the V/Line logo was altered, with serifs added to the lettering, and the "deep slashing stroke" was altered to a curved blue line. After National Express took over V/Line, the logo was again altered in 2000, with mixed-case lettering and a curving blue line underneath. In 2006, it was again altered, with the removal of the blue line underneath and addition of a purple line.

Logo introduced in 2006

The VLocity trains were delivered from 2005 in a new livery of stainless steel with purple and green highlights. In 2007, a new livery was unveiled, consisting of a grey carbody with red, white and purple stripes. Rolling stock in different variants of the livery was released throughout that year, with a consistent version not appearing until 2008, along with a number of repainted locomotives.

In 2013, a Public Transport Victoria (PTV) livery of purple and white diamonds was adopted, and was progressively applied to V/Locitys and road coaches. This livery matches the geometric designs seen on other PTV services, and uses purple in keeping with the designation of regional services with purple branding. In early 2017, locomotive N457 was re-painted with a version of the PTV livery, and Set SN 8 was re-painted to match the new livery of the V/Locity fleet. Almost all of V/Line's rolling stock have since received this purple livery, with some Sprinter sets still bearing the old livery, such as Sprinter 7003 in May 2023 and Sprinter 7005 in July 2023.

== Sponsorships ==
Since 2004, V/Line has been the naming rights sponsor of the Australian Football League's Victorian country competition for junior players. The V/Line Cup is played over several days in September and includes two boys' divisions and one girls' division.

== Publication ==
V/Line published an in-house magazine. It replaced VicRail News, initially being published as STA News then V/Line News from December 1983 until February 1991.

== Network map ==
Preceded by VicRail	Country rail in Victoria; 1983 – present	Succeeded by Incumbent operator
