= South Geelong railway station =

Railway station in Geelong, Victoria, Australia

South Geelong
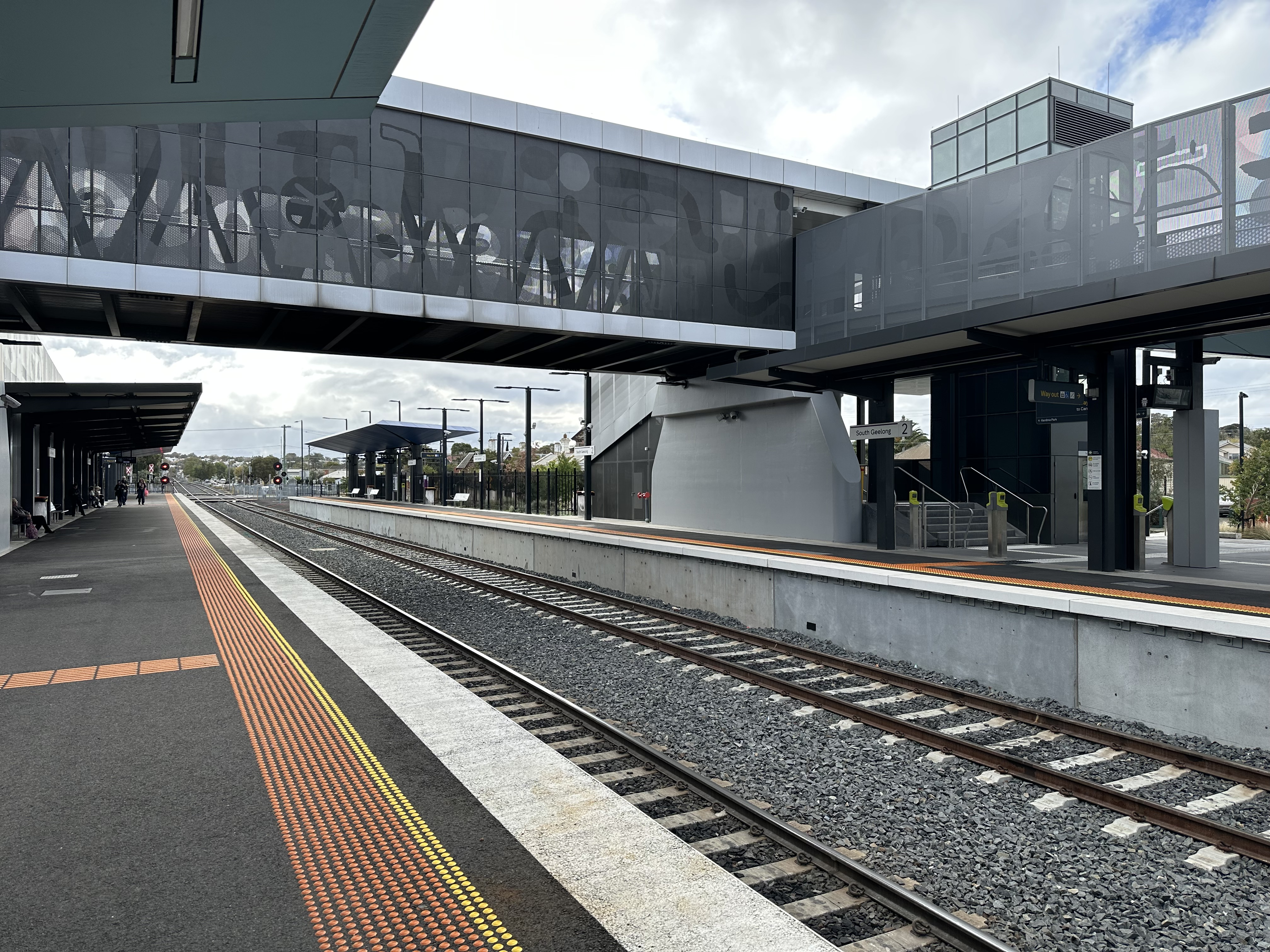
- Eastward view from platform 1 in April 2026

General information
- Location: Yarra Street, South Geelong, Victoria 3220; City of Greater Geelong; Australia
- Coordinates: 38°09′31″S 144°21′32″E
- System: PTV regional rail station
- Owner: VicTrack
- Operator: V/Line
- Lines: Geelong Warrnambool (Warrnambool)
- Distance: 74.41 kilometres from Southern Cross
- Platforms: 2 side
- Tracks: 2
- Connections: Bus

Construction
- Structure type: Ground
- Parking: Yes
- Cycle facilities: Yes
- Accessible: Yes

Other information
- Status: Operational, staffed
- Station code: SGL
- Fare zone: Myki zone 4
- Website: Public Transport Victoria

History
- Opened: 1 November 1883; 142 years ago
- Rebuilt: 30 September 1984; 26 August 2024 (Regional Rail Revival)

Passengers
- 2013-2014: 356,100
- 2014-2015: 475,834 ▼4.8%
- 2015-2016: 504,384 ▲6.1%
- 2016-2017: 527,263 ▲4.56%
- 2018-2019: 557,400
- 2019-2020: 426,950
- 2020-2021: 162,000
- 2021-2022: 181,950
- 2022-2023: 267,600
- 2023-2024: 294,500
- 2024-2025: 356,100 ▲17%

Services
Preceding station	V/Line	Following station
Geelong towards Southern Cross	Geelong line	Marshall towards Waurn Ponds
Geelong towards Southern Cross	Geelong line	Terminus
Geelong towards Southern Cross	Warrnambool line One service per night	Marshall One-way operation
Track layout
Location
- Location within Victoria

South Geelong station is a regional railway station on the Warrnambool line, part of the Victorian railway network. It serves the suburb of South Geelong, in Geelong, Victoria, Australia. It opened on 1 November 1883 and was rebuilt for the third time in 2024 as part of the Regional Rail Revival project.

== History ==
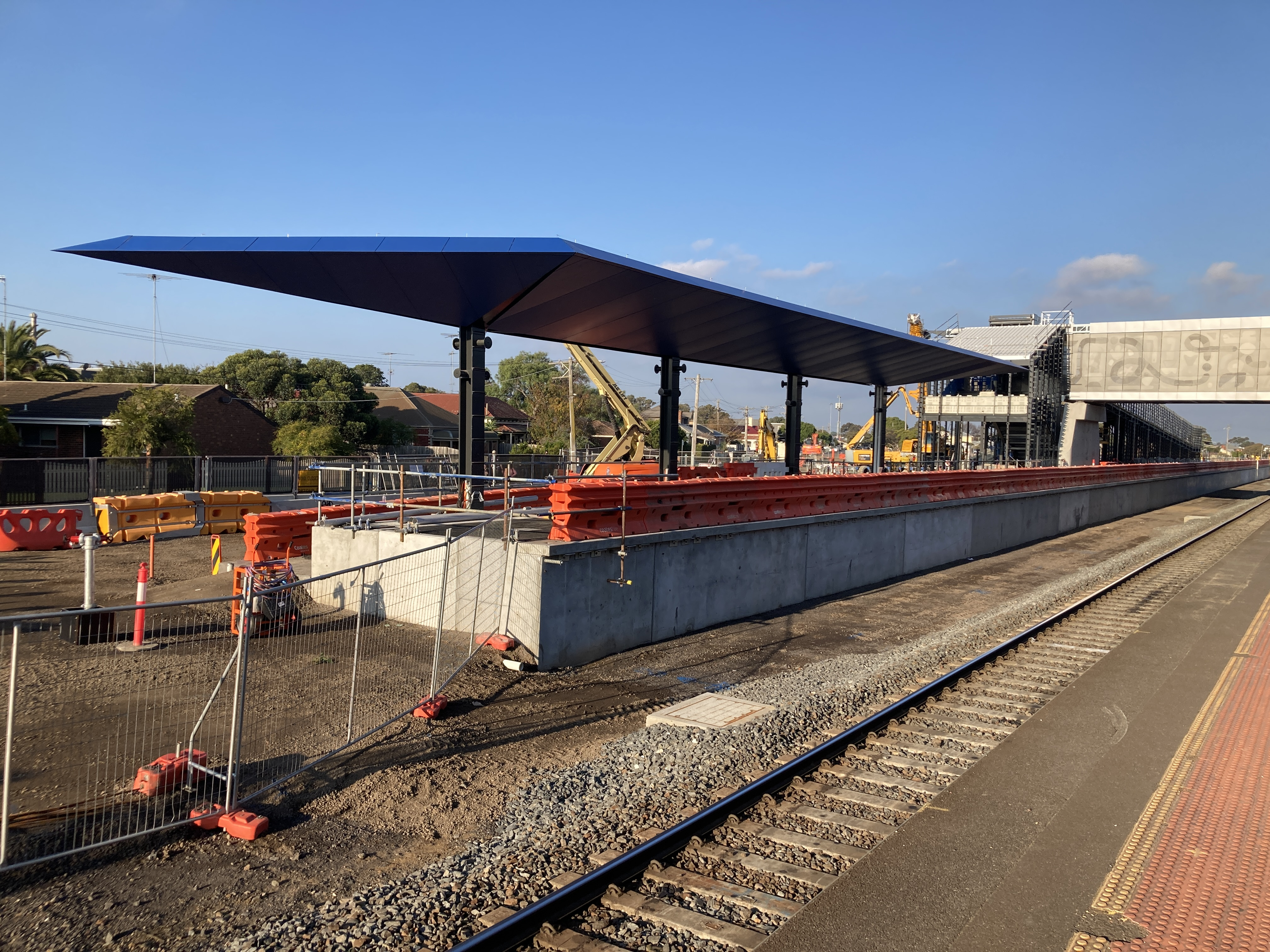
New second platform, with track still to be constructed, May 2024

The railway line from Geelong to Winchelsea opened on 25 November 1876. Prior to the establishment of the station, the site was used as a loading point for ballast and bluestone by the contractor building the Queenscliff railway line.

When the station opened, a timber station building was provided. Opposite the station was a loop siding, longer than the platform, and behind the station was a dead end siding. Around 1887 or 1888, the siding was extended and a goods shed provided.

A list of signals, dated around 1899, showed South Geelong having two home signals and two starters. In March 1900, the staff and ticket system between the sections Geelong - Queenscliff Junction - Mount Moriac, was replaced by the electric staff system. However, the station appeared to remain a block post between there and Geelong, apparently so that trains could wait at the station, instead of at Queenscliff Junction.

On 5 August 1901, Queenscliff Junction was abolished, with a new line being built parallel with the old line, effectively making South Geelong the junction for Queenscliff. An interlocking frame was also provided around that time, with the station building being partially rebuilt to accommodate the frame. After that, the large electric staff section was then Geelong "D" signal box - South Geelong - Mount Moriac, while the branch staff and ticket section became South Geelong - Drysdale.

Alterations to arrangements for the Geelong Showgrounds and the Geelong Racecourse took place a few years later. The racecourse, which was served by a short railway branch from Connewarre, moved to its present site in 1907, alongside the Showgrounds. They were served by a new siding and station.

In 1912, the platform at South Geelong was extended at its eastern (down) end, to accommodate the increasing length of trains. Similar platform extensions occurred at most stations along the line during the same year. During that time, the level crossing at nearby Moorabool Street was grade separated with an rail overpass, to allow an extension of the tram line line in Moorabool Street. A temporary loop was provided to allow trains to operate during works, with the arrangement operating until February 1913.

1914 saw alterations in the goods yard. The Bellerine Street level crossing was closed, and replaced by a pedestrian overpass (which was removed in the 1970s). The elimination of the level crossing enabled the goods yard to be enlarged, by providing two long sidings parallel to the main running line in the down direction, with a connection for down trains at the end of the platform. The sidings were brought into use in December 1914.

In 1921, the station became a depot for gravel from the Gherang pits, which were located on the short Wensleydale branch line. Other industries along the nearby Barwon River used South Geelong as a base to receive their supplies. Seven years later, on 20 June 1928, Geelong - South Geelong was converted to miniature electric staff working, with South Geelong - Racecourse - Moriac converted on 18 September of that year. An automatic staff exchanger was provided around 1930.

The crossing of trains at the station was generally avoided because of a lack of appropriate crossing facilities. Trains were only timed to cross there on special occasions, such as holiday periods. For example; on 24 December 1927, the 10.20 Warrnambool passenger service, due at South Geelong at 12.03, was due to cross the 09.35 passenger train from Camperdown, due at 12.02, and had to "wait for P3", P3 being the Warrnambool service. The train was then to wait on the Queenscliff branch line, subject to Rule 15 of Appendix VII, of the Book of Rules and Regulations. Therefore, the train, which had to wait, stood at the up home signal. That also prevented South Geelong giving Drysdale an electric staff for trains to approach, while a train waited for a cross, or shunting trains onto the branch line, while another train was approaching. On 1 June 1931, passenger services ceased on the Queenscliff line, and, a week later, the miniature electric staff was abolished. Drysdale was abolished as a staff station, and the staff and ticket system was re-introduced between South Geelong and Queenscliff.

Gates at the nearby Swanston Street level crossing were provided in 1914. In 1934, the gatekeeper was given control, via a ground frame, of two arms on "Post 3". The gatekeeper also controlled two arms above the bracket distant signal on "Post 5". That arrangement lasted until 1976, when flashing lights were provided. Boom barriers were provided later on in 2009.

The former State Electricity Commission (SECV) opened a briquette depot in the South Geelong yard in 1940, with two new sidings provided. In March of that year, the siding was extended by about 200 yards (180 m), with the staff-locked connection between the siding and the main line also extended. That proved beneficial for trains using the station to move passenger traffic to football games at nearby Kardinia Park, located nearby in Moorabool Street. Up to seven trains could be held in the yard.

On 29 September 1959, siding "A", directly opposite the station, was abolished. The run-round loop was re-instated in 1982.

Commencing on 4 November 1968, a train each way was extended from Geelong to South Geelong during the morning and afternoon peak, and a car park was established on part of the goods yard. By 1979, the number of local services to and from South Geelong had increased to eight a day.

In 1982, siding "A" was re-instated, and extended across the Yarra Street level crossing. The down end crossover was moved about approximately 175 feet (53 m), along with the down home signal. The points from the platform to the goods siding, by then rarely used, and no longer holding empty-car trains, could be Annett locked. The automatic staff exchanger was also removed during 1982. The former Queenscliff branch, which closed in 1976, was then effectively siding "B". The controls for the down and up home signals were removed, and distant signal "Post 7", in siding "B", was reduced to a single distant arm.

In October 1983, the original timber station building was demolished, and replaced by a brick building which was opened on 30 September 1984. Two years later, in February 1986, boom barriers replaced the hand-operated gates at the Yarra Street level crossing. Further signalling alterations occurred in 1989 and 1992.

South Geelong is staffed from first train to last, and is served by most Geelong-line trains. The former railway branch line to Queenscliff is now part of the Bellarine Rail Trail as far as Drysdale, and is used by the Bellarine Peninsula Railway for tourist trains between Drysdale and Queenscliff.

The former Geelong Racecourse station was located between South Geelong and Marshall stations. The last service to use the station was for the 2005 Geelong Cup. In February 2011, the loop siding serving the former platform was disconnected from the main line, as part of a sleeper renewal program. On 1 March of that year, the loop siding was abolished, effectively closing the station.

As part of the Regional Rail Revival project, the line between Waurn Ponds and South Geelong was partially duplicated. South Geelong was closed on 15 June 2024 and the station building was demolished. On 26 August 2024, the rebuilt station, with two platforms, opened to passengers, along with the partial duplication. It included the original platform as Platform 1, with a new station building, a new second platform, an accessible pedestrian overpass and lifts, along with upgraded car parking, lighting and platform shelters. Closed-circuit television and improved pedestrian better connections to nearby Kardinia Park were also part of the project.

== Platforms and services ==
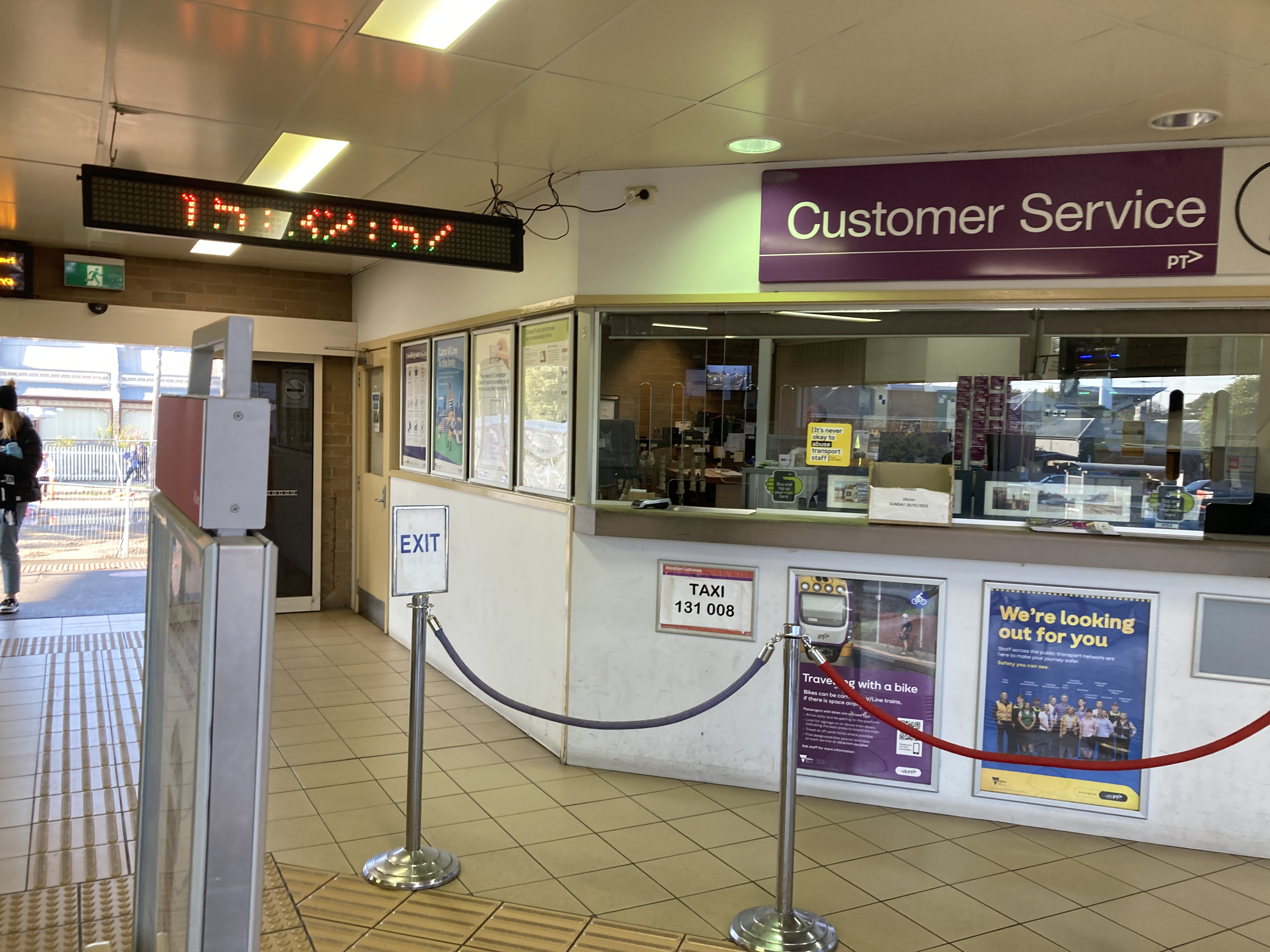
Interior of the former station building, a month prior to demolition, May 2024

South Geelong has two side platforms and is served by V/Line Geelong line trains and one Warrnambool line service towards Southern Cross each night. Some weekday Geelong-line services terminate at South Geelong, but other services continue to Waurn Ponds, following the partial duplication of the line.

South Geelong platform arrangement
Platform	Line	Destination	Notes
1	Geelong line Warrnambool line	Southern Cross	One Warrnambool line service from Warrnambool every night
2	Geelong line	Marshall, Waurn Ponds	

== Transport links ==
CDC Geelong operates a bus route via South Geelong station, under contract to Public Transport Victoria:

- 1 : North Shore station – Deakin University Waurn Ponds Campus

== External reading and links ==
- Media related to South Geelong railway station at Wikimedia Commons
- Newsrail March 1985 pp. 68–73
- Victorian Railway Stations gallery
