= Warrnambool railway line =

Railway line in Victoria, Australia

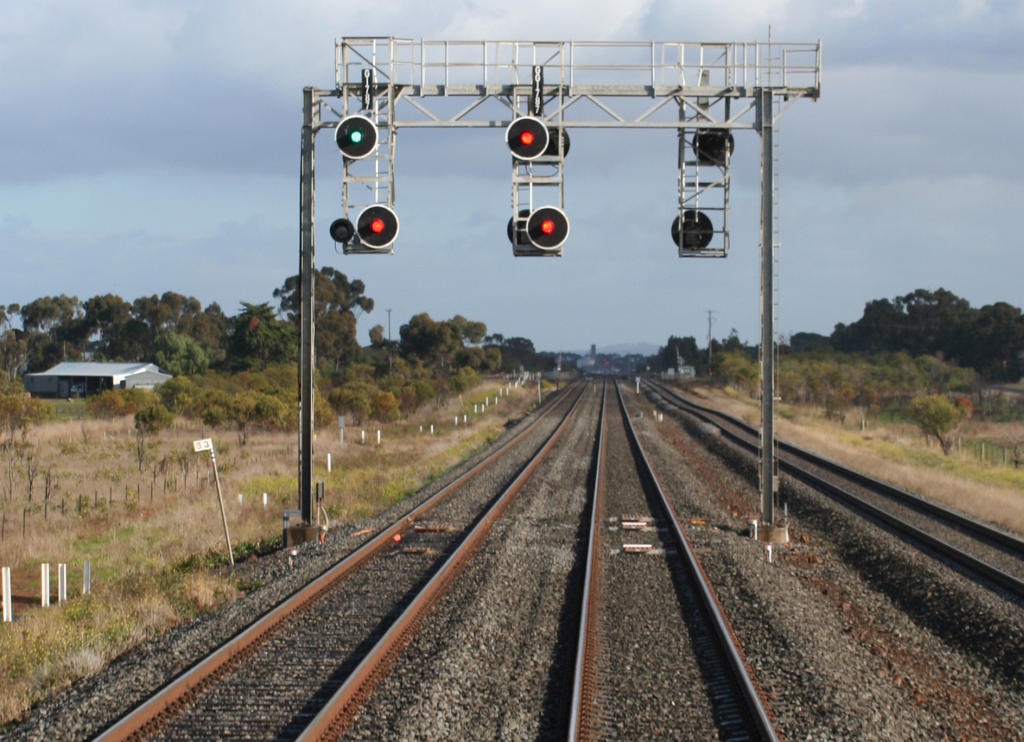
- The twin broad gauge and single standard gauge tracks near Lara, 2006

Overview
- Other names: Port Fairy railway line; Dennington railway line; South West railway line
- Status: Operational with passenger services from Southern Cross to Warrnambool; Dismantled beyond Warrnambool – Port Fairy to Warrnambool Rail Trail
- Owner: Geelong and Melbourne Railway (G&MR) (1857–1860); Victorian Railways (VR) (1860–1974); VR as VicRail (1974–1983); MTA (The Met) (1983–1989); STA (V/Line) (1983–1989); PTC (The Met) (1989–1997); PTC (V/Line) (1989–1995); West Coast Railway (1993–2004); PTC (V/Line Passenger) (1995–1997); VicTrack (1997–Current)
- Locale: Victoria, Australia
- Termini: Southern Cross; Port Fairy
- Connecting lines: All metropolitan, regional, and interstate; Deer Park–West Werribee; Geelong–Ballarat; Newport–Sunshine
- Former connections: Alvie; Colac–Ballarat; Crowes; Forrest; Gheringhap–Maroona; Hamilton–Koroit; Queenscliff; Maribyrnong; Mortlake; Timboon; Wensleydale
- Stations: 29 current stations; 41 former stations; 8 sidings; 15 former sidings

Service
- Type: Former Victorian regional service
- Services: Geelong Warrnambool Werribee Williamstown
- Operators: Geelong and Melbourne Railway (G&MR) (1857–1860); Victorian Railways (VR) (1860–1974); VR as VicRail (1974–1983); MTA (The Met) (1983–1989); STA (V/Line) (1983–1989); PTC (The Met) (1989–1998); PTC (V/Line) (1989–1995); West Coast Railway (1993–2004); PTC (V/Line Passenger) (1995–1998); Bayside Trains (1998–2000); V/Line Passenger (1998–2010); M>Train (2000–2004); Connex Melbourne (2004–2009); V/Line (2010–Current)

History
- Work began: 25 June 1857
- Opened: Greenwich to Geelong on 25 June 1857; Southern Cross to Newport on 17 January 1859; Geelong to Winchelsea on 25 November 1876; Winchelsea to Birregurra on 13 March 1877; Birregurra to Colac on 27 July 1877; Colac to Camperdown on 2 July 1883; Camperdown to Terang on 23 April 1887; Terang to Port Fairy on 4 February 1890
- Completed: 4 February 1890
- Electrified: Flinders Street to North Melbourne on 28 May 1919; North Melbourne to Altona junction on 2 August 1920; Altona junction to Werribee on 27 November 1983
- Closed: Newport to Greenwich on 18 July 1857; Dennington to Port Fairy on 12 September 1977

Technical
- Line length: 298.486 km (185.471 mi)
- Num of tracks: Six tracks – Flinders Street to Footscray; Double track: Footscray to Geelong; Single track: Geelong to Warrnambool
- Track gauge: 1,600 mm (5 ft 3 in)
- Electrification: 1500 V DC overhead Southern Cross to Werribee
- Operating speed: 160 km/h (99 mph)
- Signalling: Automatic block signalling: Southern Cross to Altona Junction; Automatic and Track Control: Altona Junction to North Geelong; Automatic block signalling: North Geelong to Geelong; Track Block: Geelong to Waurn Ponds; Automatic and Track Control: Waurn Ponds to Warrnambool
- Train protection system: TPWS

The Warrnambool railway line is a railway serving the south west of Victoria, Australia. Running from the western Melbourne suburb of Newport through the cities of Geelong and Warrnambool, the line once terminated at the coastal town of Port Fairy before being truncated to Dennington (just west of Warrnambool). This closed section of line has been converted into the 37 km long Port Fairy to Warrnambool Rail Trail. The line continues to see both passenger and freight services today.

== Services ==
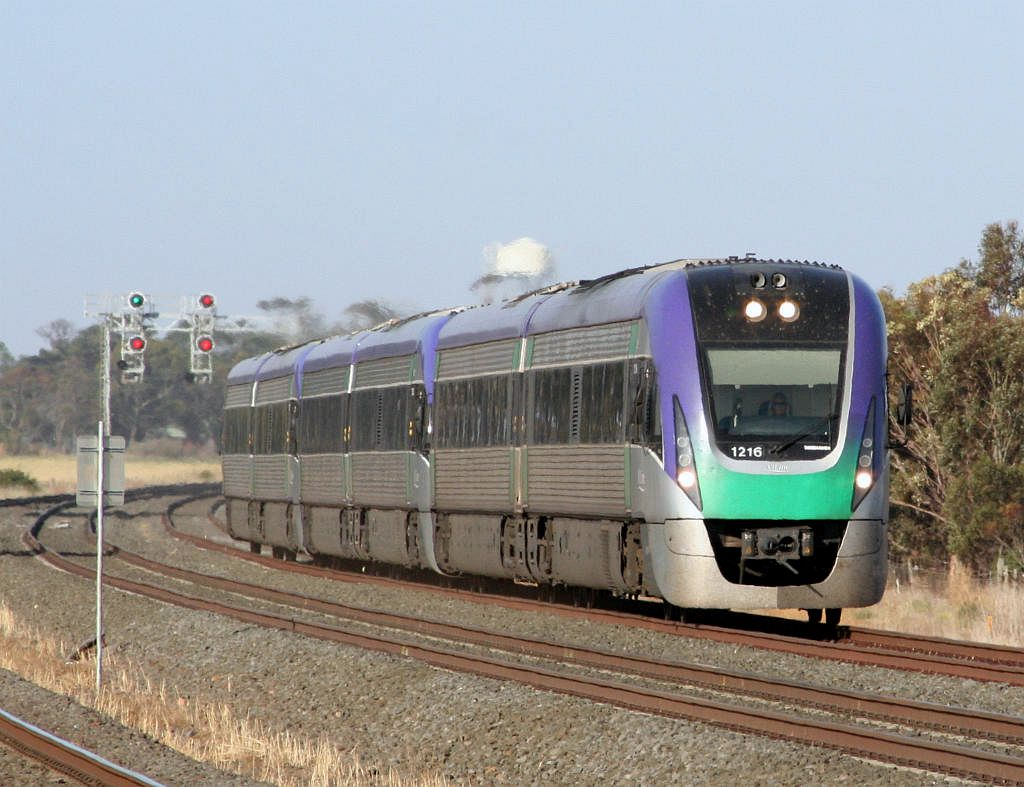
V/Line VLocity train near Little River, 2006

Metro Trains Melbourne operates suburban passenger services along the inner section of the line as far as Werribee, while V/Line operates the Geelong and the Warrnambool services. For 11 years, from 19 September 1993 until 31 August 2004, the Melbourne to Warrnambool passenger service was run by the private West Coast Railway company. Freight services also run on the line, operated by Pacific National and, for a brief period, El Zorro to the WestVic container terminal, between Warrnambool and Dennington.

== History ==
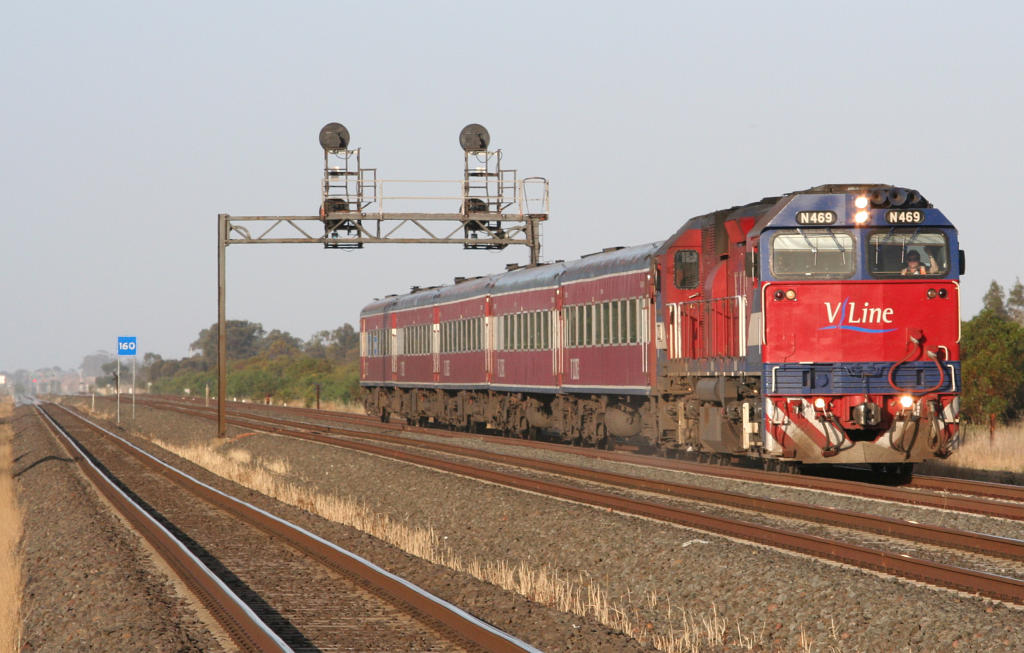
N class locomotive hauled train running near Lara, 2006

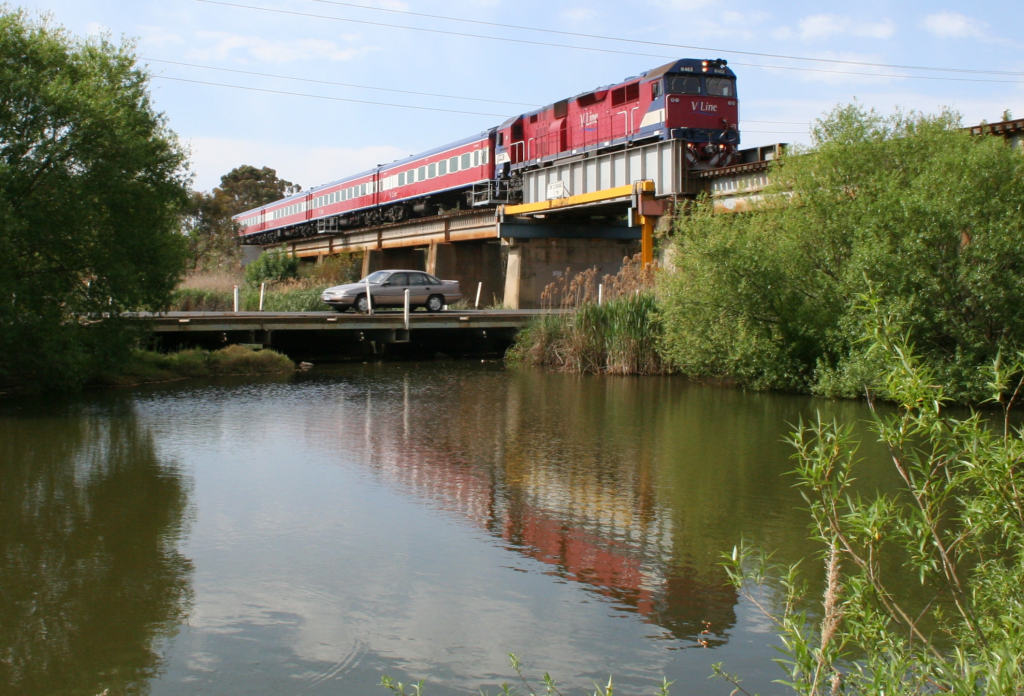
V/Line train crossing the Breakwater Bridge, 2006

The Warrnambool line was originally built by the private Geelong and Melbourne Railway Company and opened on 25 June 1857, the line being sold to the Victorian Railways in 1860. The line was designed by English engineer Edward Snell, and built as a single track. The standard of engineering was called into question as the light timber bridges required extra maintenance and had a short life span, while the decision to build only a single track resulted in slow and infrequent trains. Travelers between Melbourne and Geelong continued to prefer the bay steamers across Port Phillip Bay, leading to diminished profits for the company. At a railway commission enquiry, Snell defended his approach as necessary to complete the work in time, with the expectation that the engineering works would be upgraded as traffic and revenue increased. The railway had the misfortune of a fatal accident on its first run. The company's superintendent – and a friend of Snell's – was struck when leaning out of the train's engine as it approached a bridge. An inquiry cleared the company of any negligence.

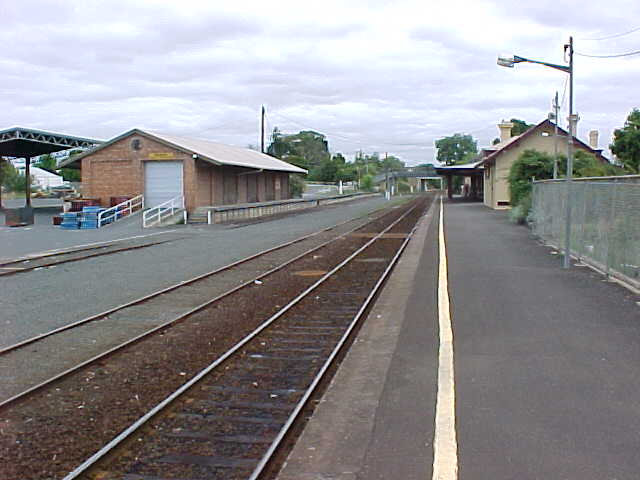
Colac station goods shed and platform, 2006

The line was progressively duplicated from the 1950s to the 1980s.

The line was later extended south-west, to Winchelsea in 1876, Colac in 1877, Camperdown in 1883, Terang in 1887 and Warrnambool, Dennington and Port Fairy in 1890. This line is now closed beyond Warrnambool, with the last train leaving Port Fairy on 10 September 1977, hauled by B75, with the line officially closing on 12 September 1977. A branch line was built from Koroit (between Warrnambool and Port Fairy) to Hamilton (on the Ararat – Portland railway), via Penshurst, in 1890. At the same time a short-lived connection was opened between Penshurst and Dunkeld (also on the Ararat – Portland railway). It closed eight years later.

Branch lines were also constructed from South Geelong to Queenscliff in 1879, from Moriac (between Geelong and Winchelsea) to Wensleydale and Terang to Mortlake in 1890, from Birregurra (between Winchelsea and Colac) to Forrest in 1891, from Camperdown to Timboon in 1892, from Irrewarra (east of Colac) to Cressy in 1910, and from Colac to Alvie in 1923.

A 2 ft 6 in (762 mm) narrow gauge branch was also opened from Colac to Beech Forest in 1902, principally to carry timber, and was extended to Weeaproniah and Crowes in 1911.

The branch lines began to be closed from the late 1940s, the Wensleydale line being the first in 1948, followed by the Forrest line in 1957, the Irrewarra line in 1953, the Alvie line in 1954, the Beech Forest line in 1962 (the section from Weeaproniah to Crowes having been closed in 1954), and the Timboon line in 1988.

In 1993 West Coast Railway won the government tender to operate passenger services to Warrnambool using former Victorian Railways locomotives and rolling stock, including a regular steam hauled service. West Coast Railway ceased operations in 2004 handing the services back to government control by V/Line.

New Marshall and Waurn Ponds stations opened along the line in April 2005 and October 2014 respectively.

In July 2012, the Minister for Public Transport announced that a new crossing loop would be constructed on the line at Warncoort, between Birregurra and Colac. Tenders were called for in August. The loop opened in April 2014.

In 2017, the Victorian State Government announced upgrades to allow VLocity railcars to travel to Warrnambool. The Warrnambool line upgrades, as part of Regional Rail Revival, include new signalling, level crossing upgrades and a second track between Boorcan and Weerite, either side of Camperdown. Other upgrades of the line (Geelong line upgrade) as part of the Regional Rail Revival include the duplication of track between South Geelong and Waurn Ponds and an upgrade of Waurn Ponds station.

=== 19th century ===
The Port Fairy line was originally built by the Geelong and Melbourne Railway Company and opened on 25 June 1857, with the line being sold to the Victorian Railways in 1860. The line was designed by English engineer Edward Snell, and built as a single track. The line was later extended south-west, to Winchelsea in 1876, Colac in 1877, Camperdown in 1883, Terang in 1877, and finally Warrnambool, Dennington, and Port Fairy in 1890. The line is now closed beyond Warrnambool, with the last train leaving Port Fairy in September 1977.

Branch lines were constructed from South Geelong to Queenscliff in 1879, from Moriac (between Geelong and Winchelsea) to Wensleydale and Terang to Mortlake in 1890, from Birregurra (between Winchelsea and Colac) to Forrest in 1891, from Camperdown to Timboon in 1892, from Irrewarra (east of Colac) to Cressy and Ballarat in 1910, and from Colac to Alvie in 1923.

In the late 1890s the line had two Mixed trains each way per day, departing Melbourne at 6:30 am and 10:55 am, and arriving at 2:15 pm and 8:11 pm. The first pair were scheduled to pass each other at Irrewarra railway station and the latter pair at Birregurra railway station.

=== 20th century ===
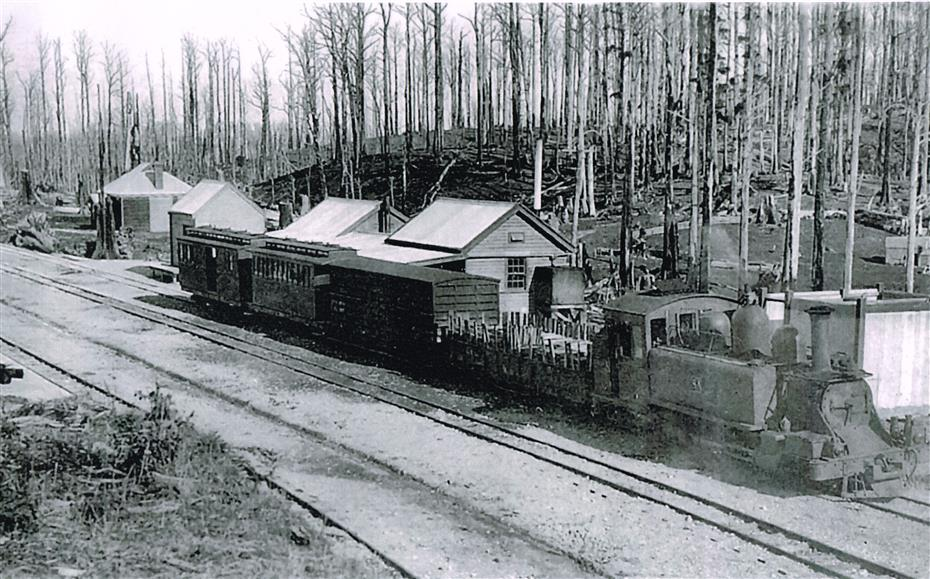
Crowes station, terminus of the Crowes railway line, was opened in 1912 and closed in 1954.

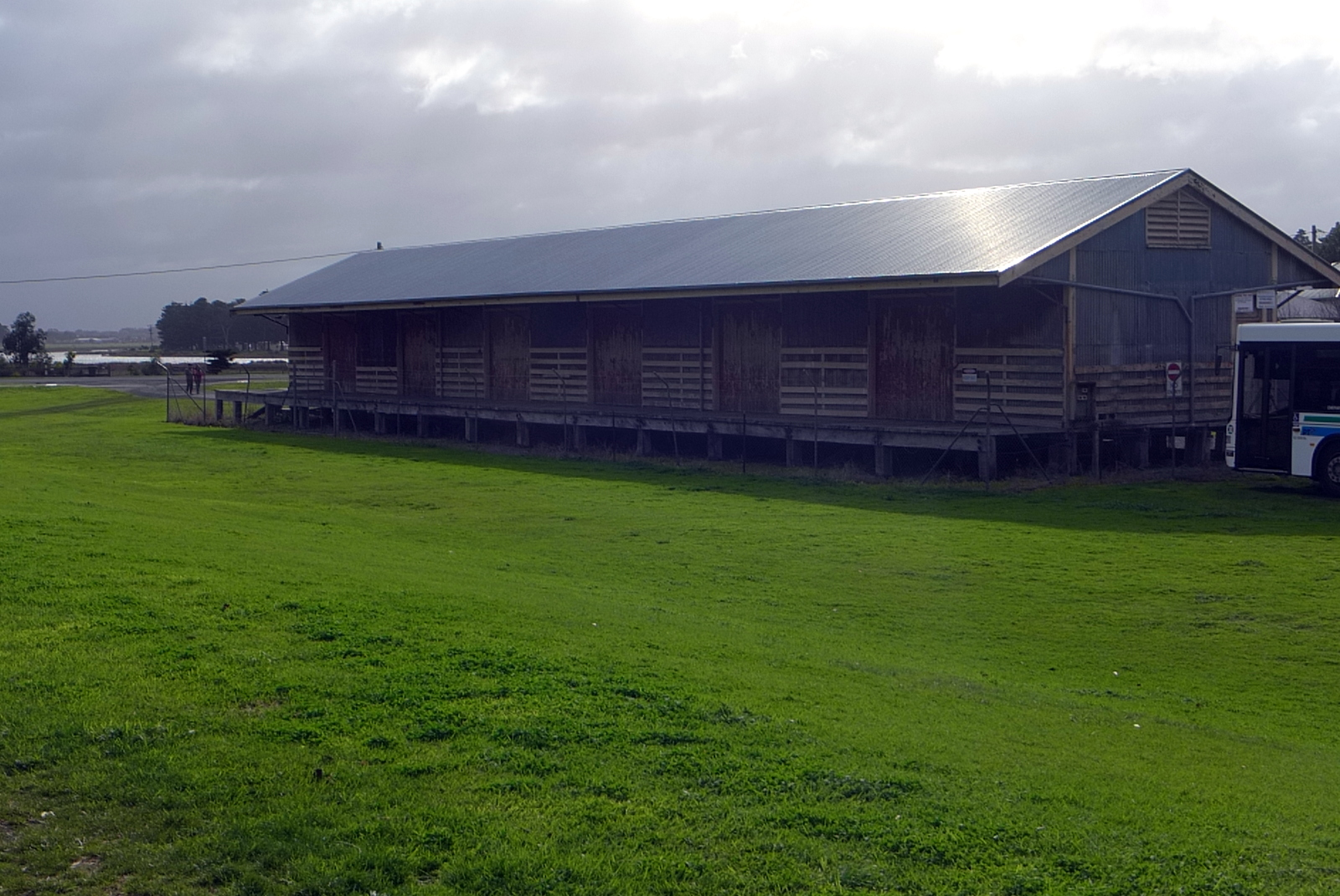
Goods shed at the original terminus at Port Fairy, 2015

Throughout the mid 20th century, numerous branch lines were closed. The Wensleydale line was the first to close in 1948, followed by the Forrest line in 1957, the Colac–Ballarat line in 1953, the Alvie line in 1954, the Forrest line in 1962 (the section from Weeaproniah to Crowes having been closed earlier in 1954), and the Timboon line in 1988, amongst a few others. These branch lines were closed due to limited passenger and freight demand with passenger rail services being replaced by coach services.

Whilst the track beyond Waurn Ponds station is mostly single with some passing loops, many duplication projects have occurred along the Geelong section of the line. The section from North Geelong to Geelong was duplicated late April 1922. 37 years later in 1959, the section of track from Corio to North Geelong was duplicated. In 1979 the track from Werribee to Little River was duplicated and the sections from Little River to Lara and Lara to Corio in 1981. The Regional Rail Revival project duplicated the track between South Geelong and Waurn Ponds in August 2024.

In September 1977, the line beyond Warrnambool was closed. The final service to Port Fairy was hauled by a Victorian Railways B75 locomotive on 12 September.

== Stations ==
Station Histories
Station	Opened	Closed	Age	Notes
Southern Cross	17 January 1859		167 years	Formerly Batman's Hill; Formerly Spencer Street
Footscray	24 September 1900		126 years	
Sunshine	7 September 1885		141 years	Formerly Braybrook Junction
Deer Park	2 April 1884		142 years	Formerly Kororoit Creek
Tarneit	15 June 2015		11 years	
West Tarneit	13 September 2026		54 days	
Wyndham Vale	15 June 2015		11 years	
Wyndham Vale South Sidings	?			Future Black Forest Road station site
Manor	2 February 1911	1 November 1970	59 years	
Mambourin	November 1888	1893	5 years	Formerly Pearce's Bros Siding
Little River	1 January 1857		169 years	Formerly Little River; Formerly Bulban
Lara	1 November 1856		170 years	Formerly Duck Ponds
Elders IXL Siding	12 March 1986	2010	24 years	
Geelong Grammar Siding	24 May 1955		114 years	
Corio	15 September 1890		136 years	Formerly Cowies Creek; Formerly Cowie
Distillers Siding	14 February 1928	c. 21 February 1987	Approx. 59 years	
North Shore	15 April 1895		131 years	Formerly North Shore; Formerly Corio
Harbour Trust Sidings	8 March 1909		117 years	
North Geelong Yard	28 January 1885		141 years	
North Geelong	1 August 1883		143 years	Formerly West Geelong
Geelong Locomotive Depot	20 May 1917		109 years	
Cunningham Pier	?	?		Formerly Railway Pier
Geelong	1 November 1856		170 years	
South Geelong	1 November 1883		143 years	
Geelong Racecourse (2nd)	1 January 1911	19 October 2005	94 years	Formerly Geelong Showgrounds
Breakwater	28 December 1889	6 March 1895	5 years	
Breakwater	25 June 1895	12 August 1898	3 years	
Marshall	14 July 1879	17 February 1964	84 years	Formerly Connewarra
Marshall	26 April 2005		21 years	
Geelong Racecourse (1st)	26 January 1877	c. January 1878	Approx. 11 months	On main line
Geelong Racecourse (1st)	22 January 1878	13 January 1906	27 years	On branch
Grovedale	c. 25 November 1876	1954	Approx. 77 years	Formerly Germantown
Duneed	c. 25 November 1876	26 July 1921	Approx. 44 years	
Waurn Ponds	12 October 2014		12 years	
Waurn Ponds Cement Siding	22 March 1963	31 May 2021	58 years	
Waurn Ponds Stabling Sidings	27 February 2023		3 years	
Pettavel	?	22 August 1952	?	Formerly Pettavel Road
Moriac	1 October 1877	5 October 1982	105 years	Formerly Mount Moriac
Buckley	?	17 October 1955	?	Formerly Buckley's Road
Winchelsea	25 November 1876		149 years	
Armytage	24 August 1911	12 November 1956	45 years	
Birregurra	13 March 1877		149 years	
Warncoort	13 March 1877	22 August 1958	81 years	
Irrewarra	1 October 1877	22 August 1958	80 years	
CRB Siding	1927	?	?	
Shell Oil Company	?	December 1975	?	
Colac	27 July 1877		149 years	
Larpent	?	?	?	
Pirron Yallock	?	5 October 1982	?	
Stoneyford	?	17 October 1955	?	
Pomborneit	?	14 August 1978	?	
Weerite	?	22 July 1975	?	
Camperdown	2 July 1883		143 years	
Boorcan	23 April 1887	5 October 1982	95 years	
Terang	23 April 1887		139 years	
Garvoc	?	30 January 1966	?	
Panmure	4 February 1890	5 October 1982	92 years	
Cudgee	?	26 September 1960	?	
Allansford	?	5 October 1982	?	
Sherwood Park	19 February 2006		20 years	
Warrnambool Caltex Oil Sidings	27 November 1946	1966	19 years	
Warrnambool Pier	c. 1890	?	?	
Warrnambool	4 February 1890		136 years	
Briquette Siding	?	?	?	
Westvic Siding	?		?	
Dennington	c. pre 1897	1 September 1958	Approx. 60 years	Passengers; Siding for British Imperial Oil Coy (later Shell); Siding for Anglo Swiss Condensed Milk Coy (later Nestle)
Dennington	1 September 1958	2002	44 years	Siding for British Imperial Oil Coy (later Shell); Siding for Anglo Swiss Condensed Milk Coy (later Nestle)
Illowa	August 1890	12 September 1977	87 years	Formerly Farnham
Koroit	4 February 1890	12 September 1977	87 years	
Crossley	4 February 1890	1 August 1955	65 years	Formerly West Koroit
Kirkstall	4 February 1890	1 September 1957	67 years	Formerly Crossley
Moyne	4 February 1890	1 September 1957	67 years	Formerly Korongah; Formerly Moyne Siding
Rosebrook	4 February 1890	1 August 1955	65 years	
Port Fairy	4 February 1890	12 September 1977	87 years	
Port Fairy Wharf	?	?	?	
