= Moriac railway station =

Former railway station in Victoria, Australia

Coordinates: 38°14′24″S 144°10′23″E

Moriac
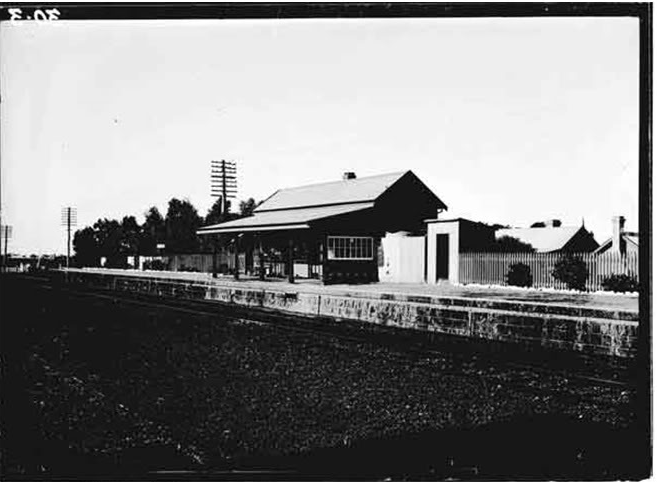
- Undated photo of the Moriac railway station

General information
- Line: Warrnambool
- Platforms: 1
- Tracks: 1

Other information
- Status: Closed

History
- Opened: 1 October 1877
- Closed: 4 October 1981

Services
Preceding station	Disused railways	Following station
Waurn Ponds	Warrnambool line	Winchelsea
Junction	Wensleydale line	Towards Wensleydale
	List of closed railway stations in Victoria	
Location

Moriac is a closed station on the Warrnambool railway line, located in the town of Moriac, Victoria. The station opened on 1 October 1877, and was one of 35 stations in Victoria, and five on the Warrnambool line, which were closed to passenger traffic on 4 October 1981, as part of the New Deal for country passengers.

Moriac station was the junction of the short branch line south to Wensleydale, which opened in 1889, and was closed in 1948.

The station was the scene of a fatal accident in April 1952. A woman was killed when a Melbourne-bound train collided with a Warrnambool-bound train which was still shunting into siding at the station to allow the Melbourne-bound train to pass it on the single track. The victim was in the first carriage of the Melbourne-bound train, which was telescoped after being forced into the tender of the locomotive.

The bluestone platform facing remains, along with the earth goods loading bank, and a wooden buffer stop.
