= Colac–Ballarat railway line =

Former railway line in Victoria, Australia

Coordinates: 38°04′30″S 143°38′13″E

The Colac to Ballarat line was a cross-country line that branched from the Warrnambool line just east of Colac and ran in a generally northerly direction to join the Ballarat–Skipton Line at Newtown, from where it ran to Ballarat station. The line was 112 km long, passing through an area dotted with lakes at its southern end, and a hilly area in the northern section.

== History ==
Construction of the line began in the late 19th century with the purpose of transferring produce from the Victoria's Western District to the industrial centre of Ballarat. The line was built in sections, from Irrewarra in the south to Beeac, and from Ballarat in the north to Newtown, as part of the Skipton Line. The link between Beeac and Newtown was eventually opened in the 1910s, but it passed through very few major settlements.

By 1896 a single train set was used for daily return trips Beeac-Colac-Birregurra-Forrest-Birregurra-Irrewarra-Beeac. This allowed connections with the Melbourne Mixed trains at Colac and Birregurra in the mornings, and at Birregurra and Irrewarra in the afternoons.

In 1905 the schedule had changed to two daily Beeac trips, so the Forrest train used its own consist that ran from Geelong as a goods train, doing a return Mixed service to Forrest then back to Geelong as a Mixed to connect with a train from there to Melbourne. This was fairly short-lived, with the combined Beeac and Forrest service resuming by 1908, though with different operating hours so multiple crews would have been required. The two lines were functionally split again when the line from Beeac was extended through Cressy to Ballarat.

The track has been removed completely and most of the land returned to adjoining farmers, but the last section of the Skipton to Ballarat line has been converted into the Ballarat–Skipton Rail Trail.

== Illabrook Rail Reserve ==
The site of Illabrook station, that used to include the station building and a goods shed, is now the Illabrook Rail Line Nature Conservation Reserve.

== Cressy Station ==
Cressy was located where the Colac-Ballarat line junctioned with the Gheringhap-Maroona cross-country line, and it became a major station after the two lines opened in the 1910s. Facilities included a large station building with an elevated signal box, and a refreshment room. From the closing of the Colac-Ballarat line in 1953, the station was progressively downgraded, and it was closed in the 1990s. Today almost no trace of the station remains.
