= Koonendah railway station =

Former railway station in Australia

Koonendah

General information
- Location: Australia
- Owner: VicTrack
- Line: Morlake

Other information
- Status: Demolished

History
- Opened: 4 February 1890
- Closed: 1900
- Former names: Keilambete

Services
Preceding station	Disused railways	Following station
Terang Racecourse	Mortlake line	Mortlake
	List of closed railway stations in Victoria	

Koonendah railway station was a railway station on the Mortlake railway line. It was opened on 4 February 1890, as Keilambete railway station. It was closed in 1890 then reopened in 1891 and closed again in 1900. Only a total of 184 passengers used the station during its lifetime.
