= Geelong railway station =

Railway station in Geelong, Victoria, Australia

Geelong
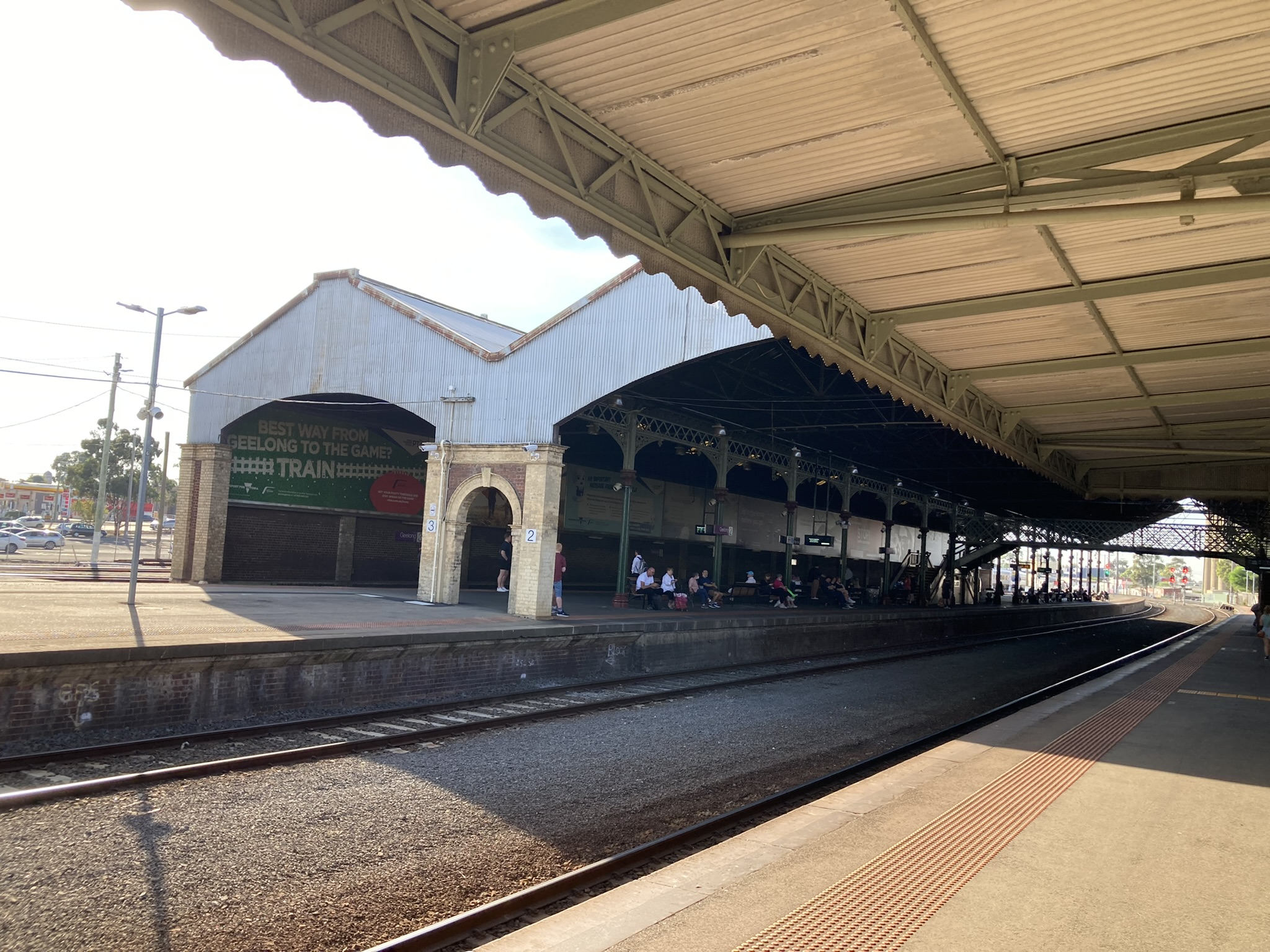
- Northbound view from Platform 1, April 2022

General information
- Location: Gordon Avenue, Geelong, Victoria 3220; City of Greater Geelong; Australia
- Coordinates: 38°08′40″S 144°21′18″E
- System: PTV regional rail station
- Owner: VicTrack
- Operator: V/Line
- Lines: Geelong Warrnambool (Warrnambool)
- Distance: 72.57 kilometres from Southern Cross
- Platforms: 3 (1 island, 1 side)
- Tracks: 9
- Connections: Bus; Coach

Construction
- Structure type: Ground
- Parking: Yes
- Cycle facilities: Yes
- Accessible: Yes

Other information
- Status: Operational, staffed
- Station code: GLG
- Fare zone: Myki zone 4
- Website: Public Transport Victoria

History
- Opened: 1 November 1856; 169 years ago

Passengers
- 2013-2014: 642,481
- 2014-2015: 638,016 ▼0.62%
- 2015-2016: 691,022 ▲8.3%
- 2016-2017: 716,314 ▲3.61%

Services
Preceding station	V/Line	Following station
North Geelong towards Southern Cross	Geelong line	Terminus
North Geelong towards Southern Cross	Geelong line	South Geelong Terminus
North Geelong towards Southern Cross	Geelong line	South Geelong towards Waurn Ponds
Footscray towards Southern Cross	Warrnambool line	Waurn Ponds towards Warrnambool
North Geelong One-way operation	Warrnambool line One weekday evening service	Waurn Ponds towards Warrnambool
North Geelong towards Southern Cross	Warrnambool line One service per night	Marshall One-way operation
Location
- Location within Victoria

Geelong railway station is a regional railway station on the Warrnambool line, part of the Victorian railway network. It serves the city of the same name, in Victoria, Australia. The original station opened on 1 November 1856.

Together with Ballarat, it is one of only two stations in Victoria to retain its 19th-century train shed. The station has been listed by the National Trust of Australia as being of state-level significance, and is on the Victorian Heritage Register.

== History ==
The first Geelong station was built as the terminus of the Geelong and Melbourne Railway Company line. It was a dead-end terminus, located on the site of the present law courts complex. In November 1876, the railway was extended south to Winchelsea, necessitating the relocation of the station to the west and, between 1877 and 1881, the current station building was constructed.

In 1975, the station received a minor upgrade to the refreshment rooms, and was also provided with a waiting room around that time. In 1988, the station received a more significant upgrade, which included new passenger waiting areas and booking offices.

Until the 1990s, there was a goods yard, including a large goods shed, located on the eastern side of the station. That area is now the site of Geelong's law courts and police station. A locomotive depot remains to the north, and carriage stabling sidings are to the west.

In March 2015, a further upgrade to the station was completed, which included the installation of a new DDA-compliant pedestrian overpass to connect all platforms, which included lifts, avoiding the need to use the original heritage-protected pedestrian bridge, which only has stairs.

== Platforms and services ==
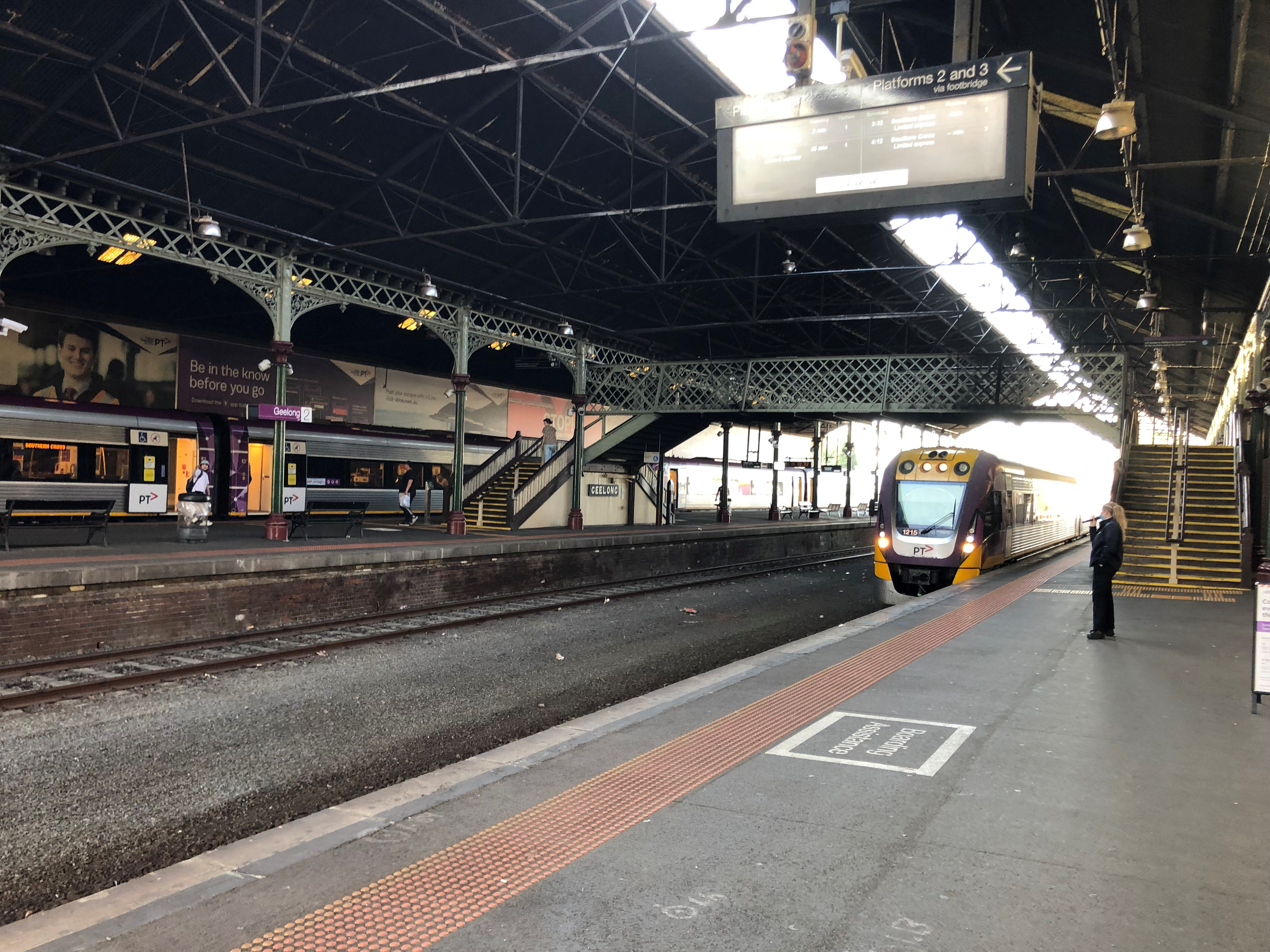
V/Line VLocity trains at Platform 1 and Platform 3, one bound for Warrnambool and the other for Southern Cross, April 2022

Geelong has one island platform with two faces, and one side platform, and is served by V/Line Geelong and Warrnambool line trains.

Geelong platform arrangement
Platform	Line	Destination
1	Geelong line Warrnambool line	South Geelong, Marshall, Waurn Ponds, Warrnambool, Southern Cross
2	Geelong line Warrnambool line	Southern Cross
3	Geelong line Warrnambool line	Southern Cross

== Transport links ==
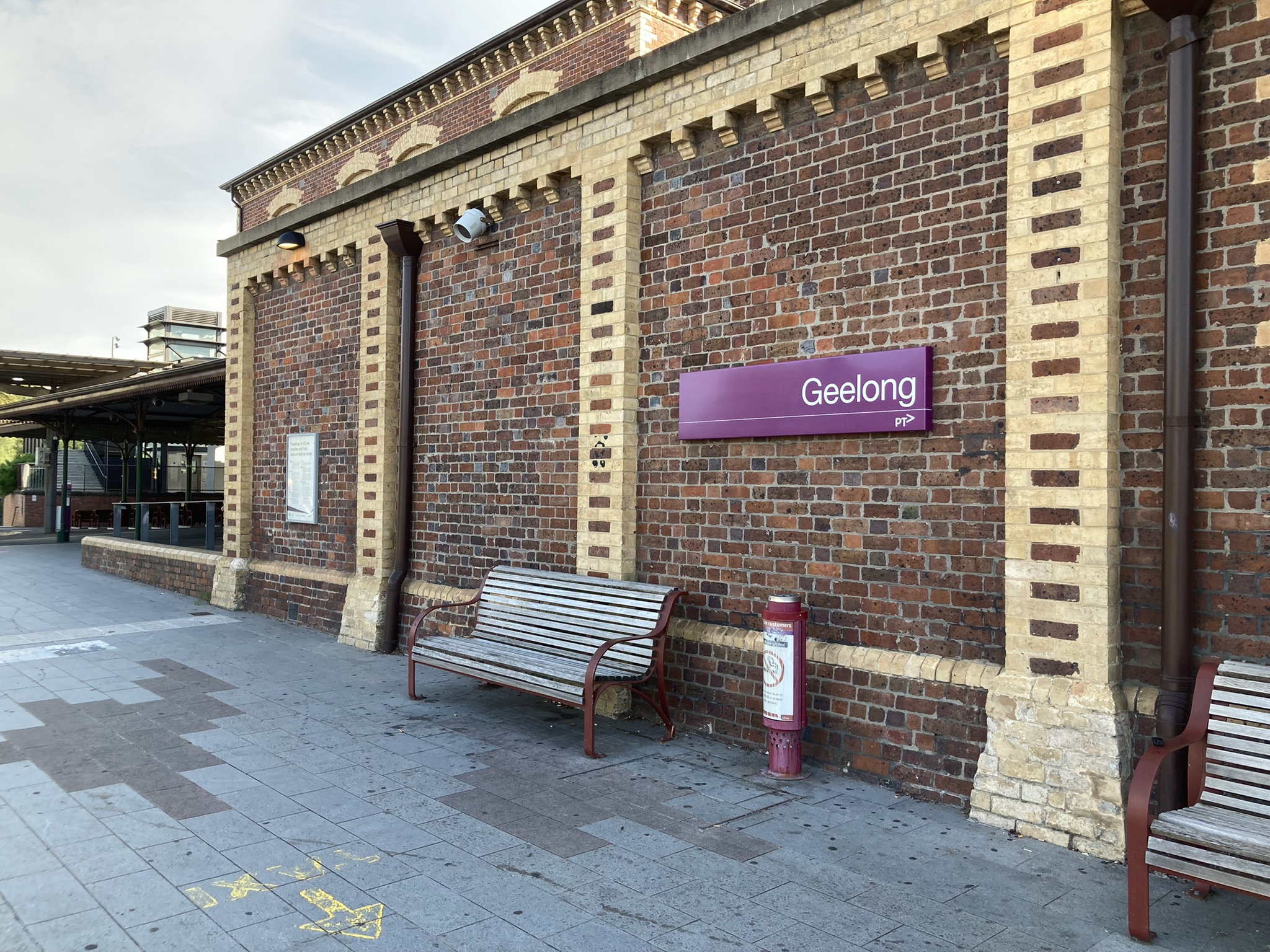
Exterior of the station building, looking towards the main entrance, April 2022

CDC Geelong operates seven bus routes via Geelong station, under contract to Public Transport Victoria:

- 1 : North Shore station – Deakin University Waurn Ponds Campus
- 19 : Geelong – Bannockburn
- 20 : to Corio Shopping Centre
- 22 : to North Shore station
- 24 : to North Geelong station
- 25 : to Bell Post Hill
- 43 : to Deakin University Waurn Ponds Campus

McHarry's Buslines operates twelve routes via Geelong station, under contract to Public Transport Victoria:

- 30 : to Whittington
- 31 : to St Albans Park
- 32 : to Leopold
- 40 : to Deakin University Waurn Ponds Campus
- 41 : to Deakin University Waurn Ponds Campus
- 42 : to Deakin University Waurn Ponds Campus
- 50 : to Jan Juc
- 51 : to Jan Juc
- 55 : to Ocean Grove
- 56 : to Queenscliff
- 60 : to St Leonards
- 61 : to Drysdale

V/Line operates road coach services from Geelong station to Apollo Bay, Ballarat, Colac and Warrnambool.

== Gallery ==
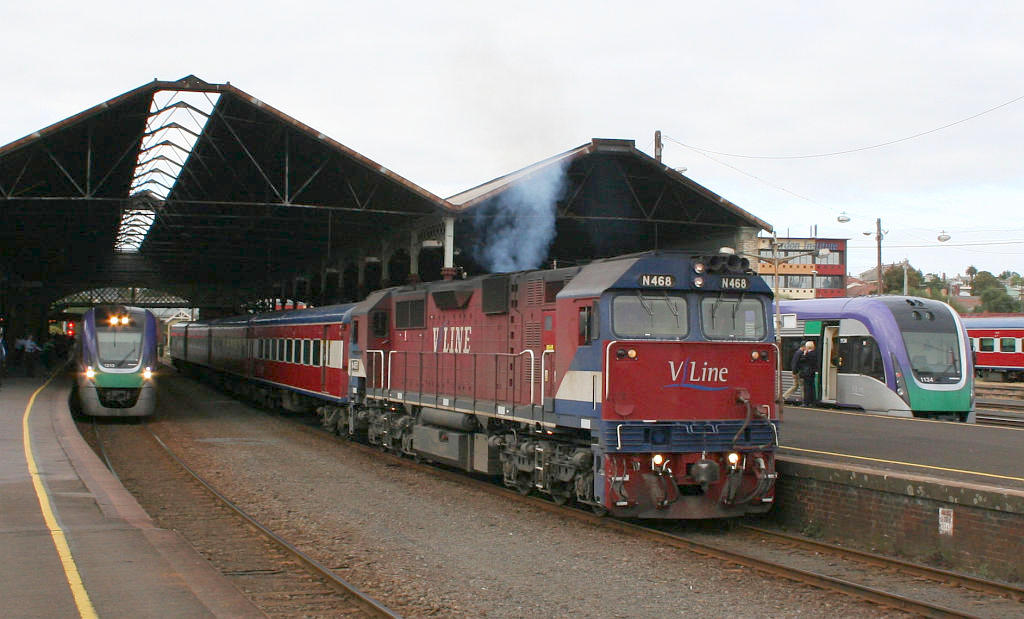
Southbound view from Platform 1 with all three platforms occupied, October 2006

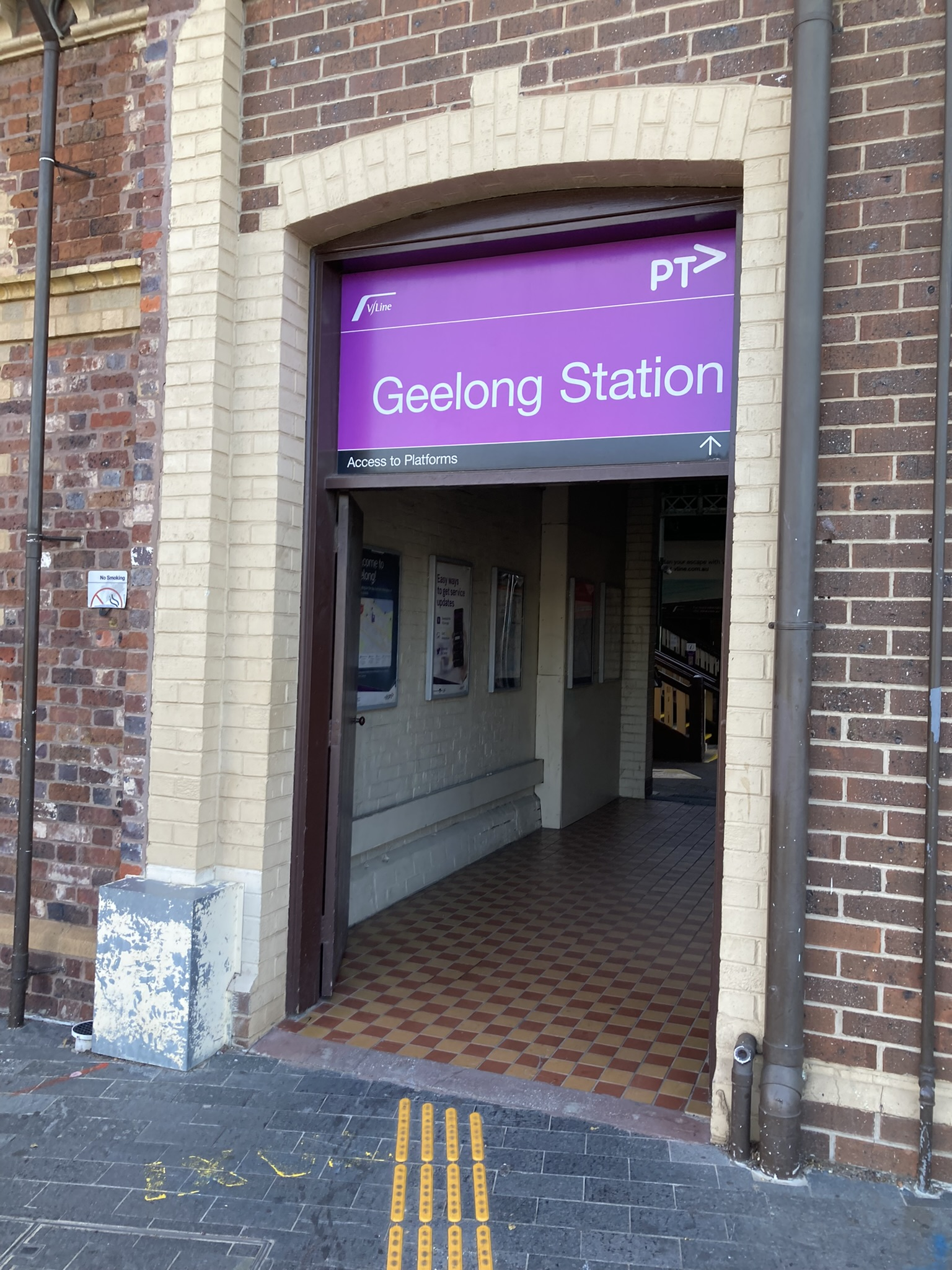
Side entrance to platform 3, April 2022
