= Colac railway station =

Railway station in Victoria, Australia

Colac
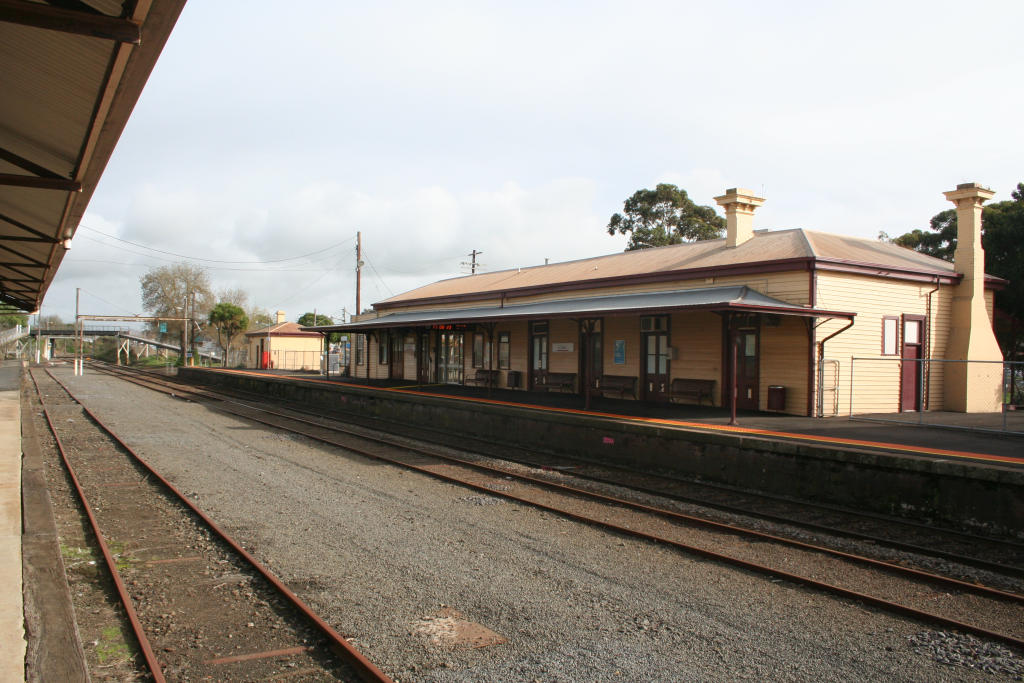
- Westbound view of the station building looking from disused Platform 2, June 2008

General information
- Location: Gellibrand Street, Colac, Victoria 3250; Shire of Colac Otway; Australia
- Coordinates: 38°20′36″S 143°35′13″E
- System: PTV regional rail station
- Owner: VicTrack
- Operator: V/Line
- Line: Warrnambool (Warrnambool)
- Distance: 153.40 kilometres from Southern Cross
- Platforms: 1
- Tracks: 4
- Connections: Bus

Construction
- Structure type: Ground
- Parking: Yes
- Accessible: Yes

Other information
- Status: Operational, staffed part-time
- Station code: COL
- Fare zone: Myki zone 11/12
- Website: Public Transport Victoria

History
- Opened: 27 July 1877; 149 years ago

Services
Five services in each direction on weekdays
Three services in each direction on weekends
| Preceding station | V/Line | Following station |
|---|---|---|
| Birregurra towards Southern Cross | Warrnambool line | Camperdown towards Warrnambool |
Location
- Location within Victoria

Colac railway station is a regional railway station on the Warrnambool line, part of the Victorian railway network. It serves the town of the same name, in Victoria, Australia, and was opened on 27 July 1877.

== History ==
When Colac station opened, it was the terminus of the line from Birregurra. On 2 July 1883, the line was extended to Camperdown.

Goods facilities included a brick goods shed, and a steel portal framed shelter was added when the Freightgate centre during the 1980s. During 1988, a number of sidings were removed, including the oil siding at the up end, and No. 6 road. In 2008, the points for the crossing loop were removed.

The station, in conjunction with Irrewarra railway station and Birregurra railway station, operated as a terminus, interchange and/or locomotive depot for some services from Beeac (on what would later be the Colac–Ballarat railway line) and Forrest at various times.

Colac was the starting point and interchange station for the 2 ft 6 in (762 mm) gauge Crowes line, which was opened in March 1902 to serve farming and timber-harvesting areas in the Otway Ranges. The line was built in two stages, with the first section to Beech Forest opening on 1 March 1902, and the second to Crowes, on 20 June 1911. The line was closed in sections: Ferguson to Crowes on 9 December 1954, followed by a reopening to Weeaproinah on 19 January 1955, and full closure on 30 June 1962.

In December 2010, a siding was provided for the stabling of track maintenance machines.

== Platforms and services ==
Colac has one platform and is served by V/Line Warrnambool line trains.

Colac platform arrangement
| Platform | Line | Destination |
|---|---|---|
| 1 | Warrnambool line | Southern Cross, Warrnambool |

== Transport links ==
Christian's Bus Company operates three routes via Colac station, under contract to Public Transport Victoria:

- 1 : Colac – Elliminyt
- 2 : Colac – Colac West
- 3 : Colac – Colac East
