= Alvie railway line =

Former railway line in Victoria, Australia

The Alvie railway line was a branch line in Victoria, Australia, that left the Warrnambool line just west of Colac and proceeded in a generally north-westerly direction to Alvie. It was 16 kilometres long, and operated from 1923 to 1954.

== History ==
The line was built to allow farmers in the area, particularly onion and potato growers, to transport their produce to Colac and around Victoria. It was constructed between October 1922 and June 1923 and officially opened at Alvie on 21 June 1923.

There were stations and loading facilities at Alvie, Cororooke and Coragulac. For the first few years, the train operated three times a week, with a passenger carriage attached to the goods wagons. However, the passenger carriage was discontinued in December 1930 owing to lack of demand, and passengers from then on had to travel in the guards van.

The Royal train conveying the Duke of Gloucester around Victoria stopped at Alvie and spent the night there on 1 November 1934. To the disappointment of locals, the Duke was ill with catarrh and remained in the train.

The increasing availability of road transport led to a decline in the use of the line after World War II, and it was closed on 17 December 1954. The track was removed in 1957, and the land it occupied has now reverted to private ownership.
