= Hamilton–Koroit railway line =

Former railway line in Victoria, Australia

Hamilton-Koroit Line

Overview
- Status: Closed
- Former connections: Portland and Port Fairy lines
- Stations: 10

Service
- Type: V/Line passenger service

History
- Opened: 1890
- Closed: 1977

Technical
- Line length: 84 km
- Number of tracks: 1 (now removed)

The Hamilton-Koroit railway line was a branch line running south west from the Portland Main Line at Coleraine Junction near the town of Hamilton, to the town of Koroit, where it joined the Port Fairy line. Opening in 1890, the line was 84 kilometers long and entirely single track apart from at stations. Since the closure of the line in 1977, the track has been removed and the rail reserve mostly sold as well, with very little trace of railway left.

== History ==
The entire line was opened on 22 August 1890 with the purpose of transporting produce and timber from Victoria's south into the port at Portland and through the rest of Western Victoria. Initially, the line had two separate connections to the Ararat–Portland line, with a secondary one running between Penshurst and Dunkeld. However, that line was very short-lived, being closed to traffic on 24 March 1891.

Most of the trains that ran on the line were carried mixed traffic, and usually ran from Melbourne to Koroit via the Port Fairy line, before continuing to Hamilton. Declines in both passenger and freight traffic led to smaller stations along the line being closed during the 1950s and 1960s, and the line was closed completely on 12 September 1977, along with the Dennington–Port Fairy section of the Port Fairy line.
