= Birregurra railway station =

Railway station in Victoria, Australia

Birregurra
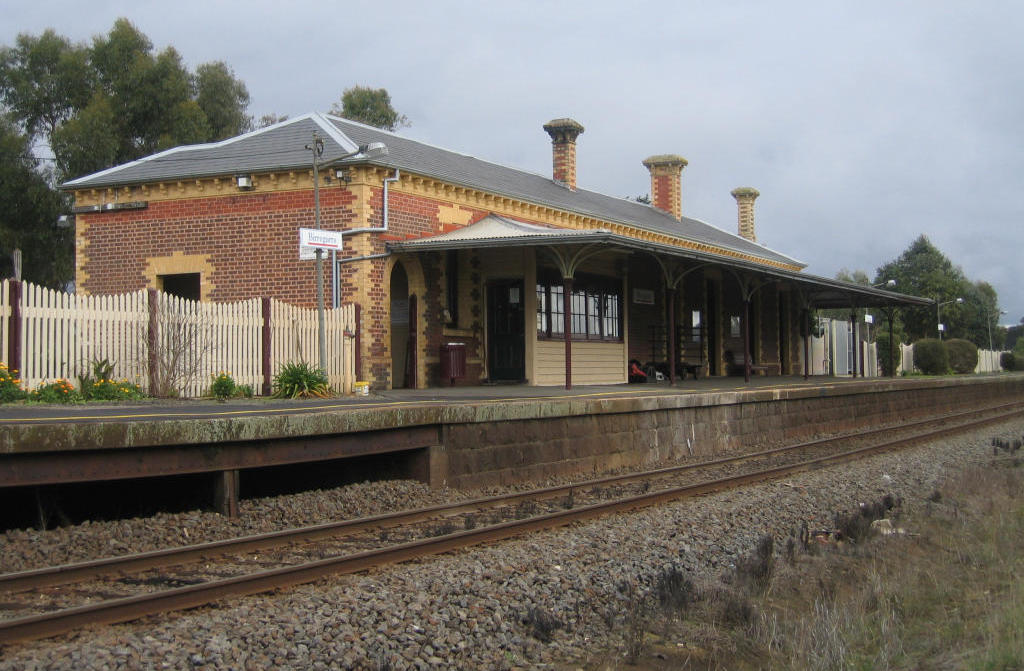
- Southbound view of the station building and platform, July 2005

General information
- Location: Birregurra Road, Birregurra, Victoria 3242; Shire of Colac Otway; Australia
- Coordinates: 38°19′43″S 143°47′00″E
- System: PTV regional rail station
- Owner: VicTrack
- Operator: V/Line
- Line: Warrnambool (Warrnambool)
- Distance: 134.29 kilometres from Southern Cross
- Platforms: 1
- Tracks: 1

Construction
- Structure type: Ground
- Parking: Yes
- Accessible: Yes

Other information
- Status: Operational, unstaffed
- Station code: BGU
- Fare zone: Myki zone 9/10
- Website: Public Transport Victoria

History
- Opened: 13 March 1877; 149 years ago

Services
Five services in each direction on weekdays
Three services in each direction on weekends
Preceding station	V/Line	Following station
Winchelsea towards Southern Cross	Warrnambool line	Colac towards Warrnambool
Location
- Location within Victoria

Birregurra railway station is located on the Warrnambool line in Victoria, Australia. It serves the town of Birregurra, and opened on 13 March 1877.

== History ==
When Birregurra station opened, it was the temporary terminus of the line from Winchelsea. On 27 July 1877, the extended line to Colac was opened.

At one time, the station was the junction of the Forrest branch line, which opened in December 1889, and closed in March 1957.

The sheep and cattle race was abolished in 1973.

The station was to be one of the 35 stations closed under the New Deal for Country Passengers in 1981, but received a last-minute reprieve prior to the New Deal timetable being introduced.

All the sidings formerly provided have been removed, but the original station building remains on the platform, as well as an iron water tower behind it. In 1996, the run-down station building was restored under the auspices of the South Western Railway Society, utilising people employed through the Federal Government's New Work Opportunities scheme.

== Platforms and services ==
Birregurra has one platform. It is served by V/Line Warrnambool line trains.

Birregurra platform arrangement
Platform	Line	Destination
1	Warrnambool line	Southern Cross, Warrnambool
