= Port Fairy to Warrnambool Rail Trail =

Rail trail in Victoria, Australia

Coordinates: 38°17′17″S 142°21′19″E

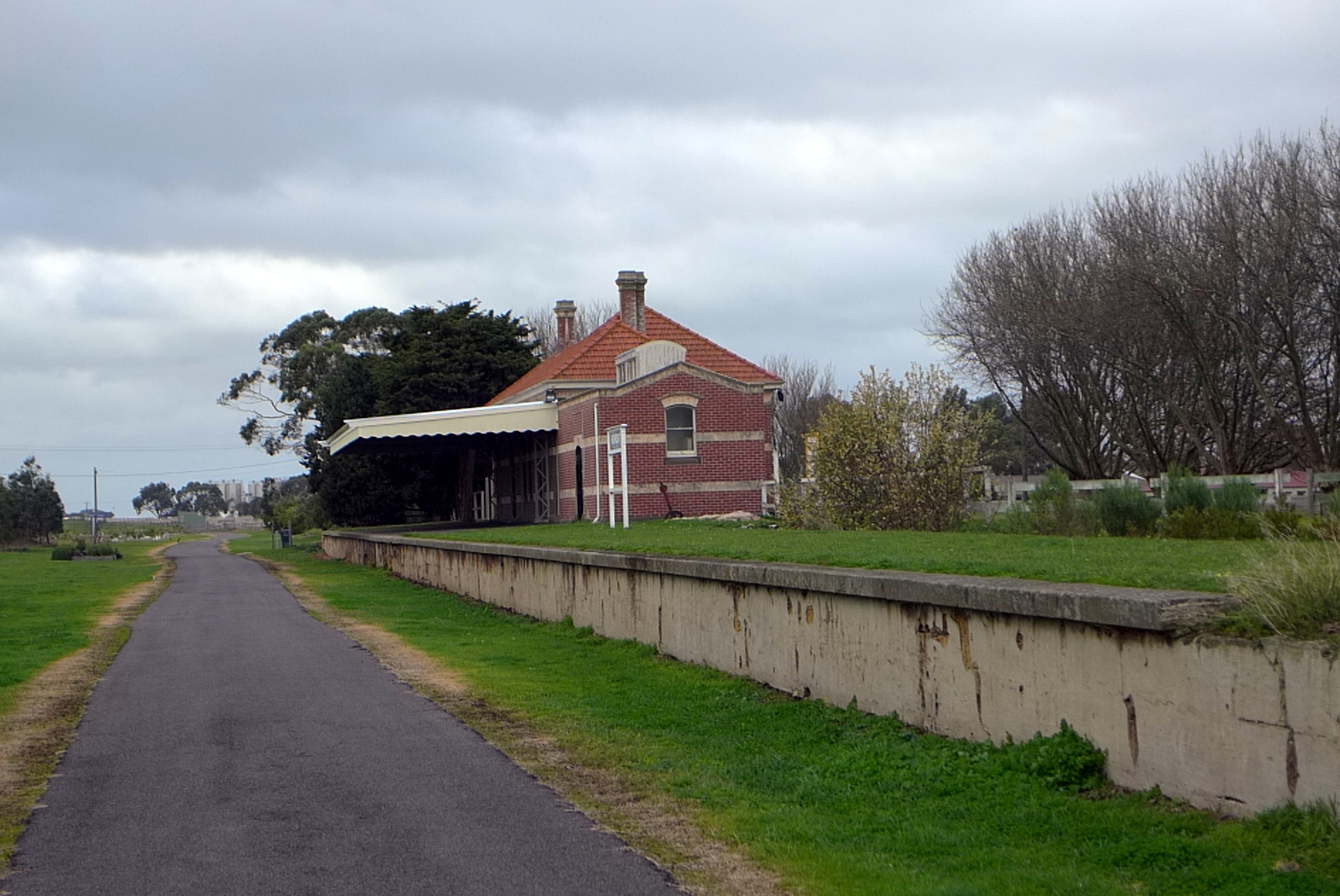
The former Koroit Station building, halfway along the rail trail.

The Port Fairy - Warrnambool Rail Trail is a 37.5 kilometre rail trail in southwestern Victoria, Australia. The official opening of the trail took place on 31 May 2012 at the Koroit Railway station building.

== Route ==
The trail begins in Port Fairy, running north then east through Koroit where it turns back southeast to Warrnambool. About two thirds is within Moyne Shire and one third within Warrnambool City. The overall construction cost of the project was approximately $2.2 million.

The trail from Port Fairy to Illowa follows the path of a former branch line which ran from Port Fairy to Warrnambool and connected with the Serviceton railway line, via Hamilton. This branch line was commissioned in 1884, completed in 1890. It served primarily to connect the ports of Warrnambool and Port Fairy with destinations inland. With declining port usage, the line closed in 1977.

The trail from Illowa to Warrnambool is not on the former rail track alignment, as that section of the rail reservation has been utilised for a realignment of the Princes Highway. Instead, from Lane's Lane to Millers Lane, the trail follows the old alignment of the Princess Highway (now called Illowa Road) for several kilometres on a dedicated bicycle lane beside the roadway. The bicycle lane has been fenced off to provide greater safety.

From the end of Millers Lane, the trail continues south off-road across Kelly's Swamp, then east parallel to the coast to Levy's Point. From there, the trail largely follows the cutting of the Merri River virtually all the way to the end of the trail at the Warrnambool Breakwater.

The rail trail is partly paved for the sections which parallel the old alignment of the Princess Highway along with bitumen in town areas. The remaining sections are not sealed and use Packed limestone, and quartz gravel which may be rough in sections. the rail trail is accessible on hybrid, gravel, or mountain bikes. After prolonged and very heavy rain, the section of the trail at the Merri River and Kellys Swamp maybe impassable for short periods of time.

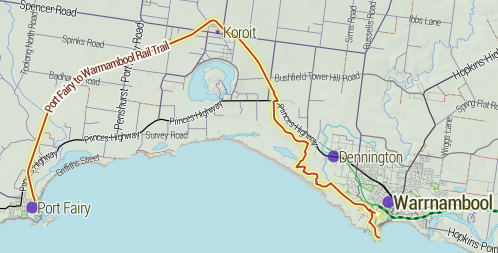

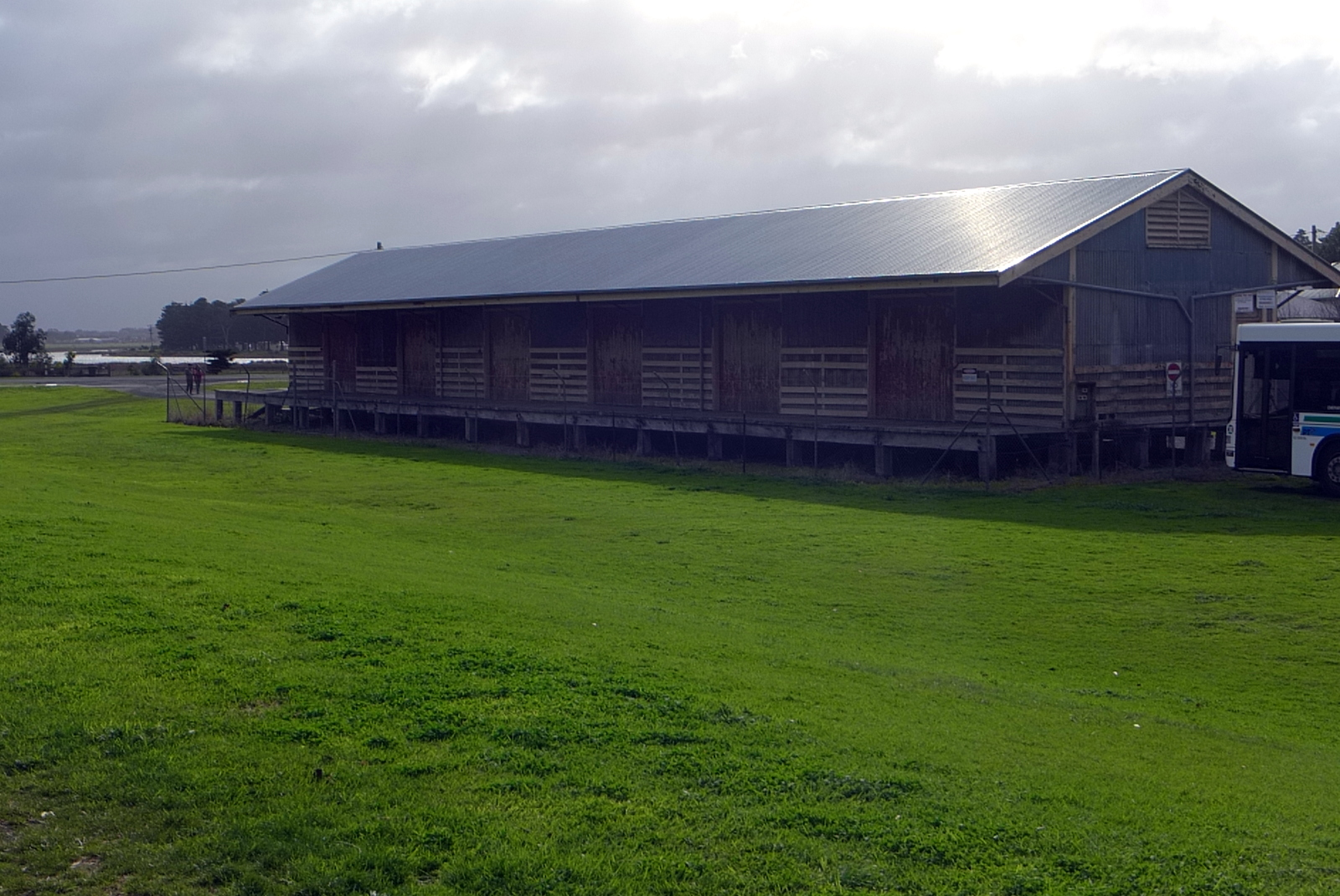
Old station building at Port Fairy.

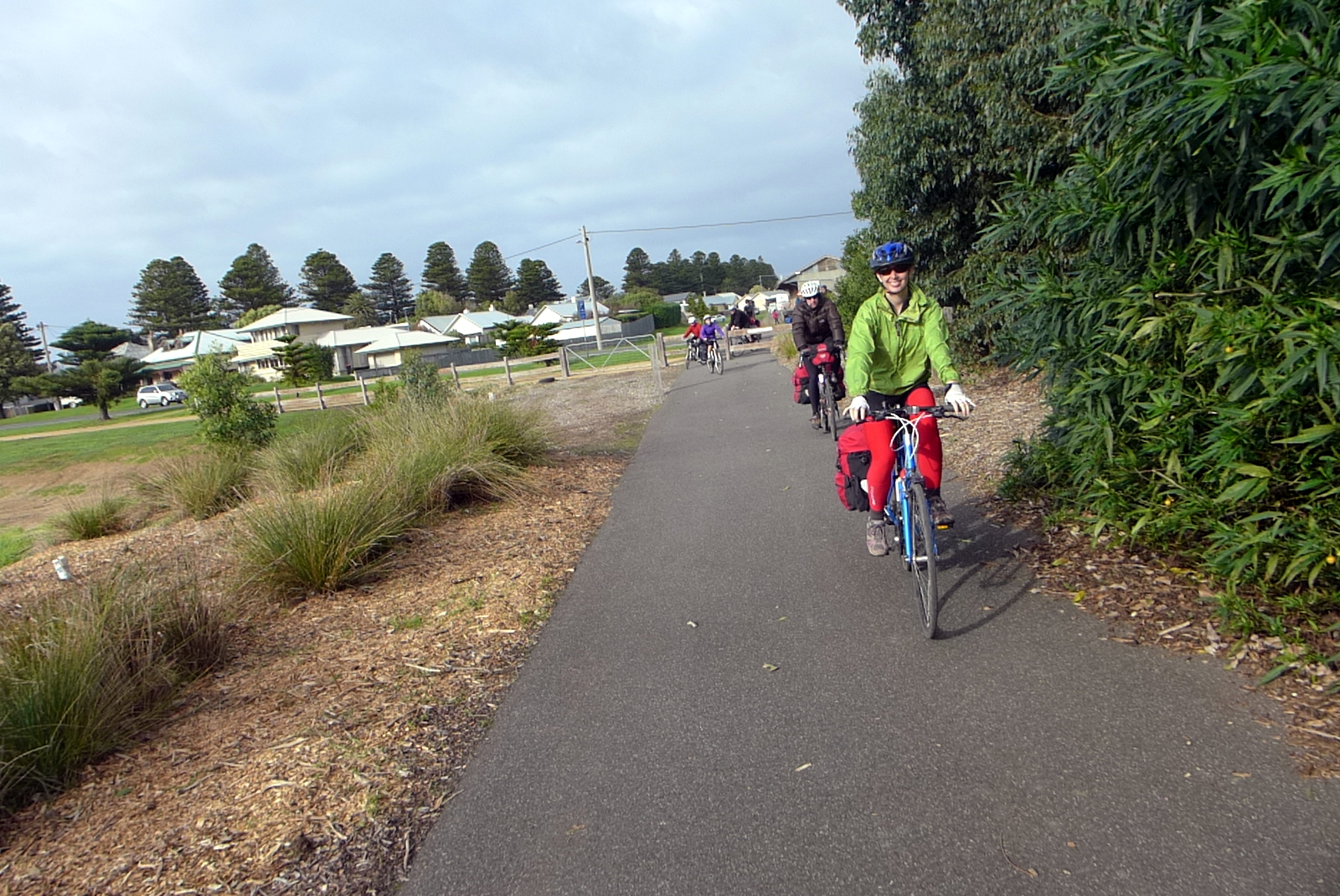
Leaving Port Fairy.

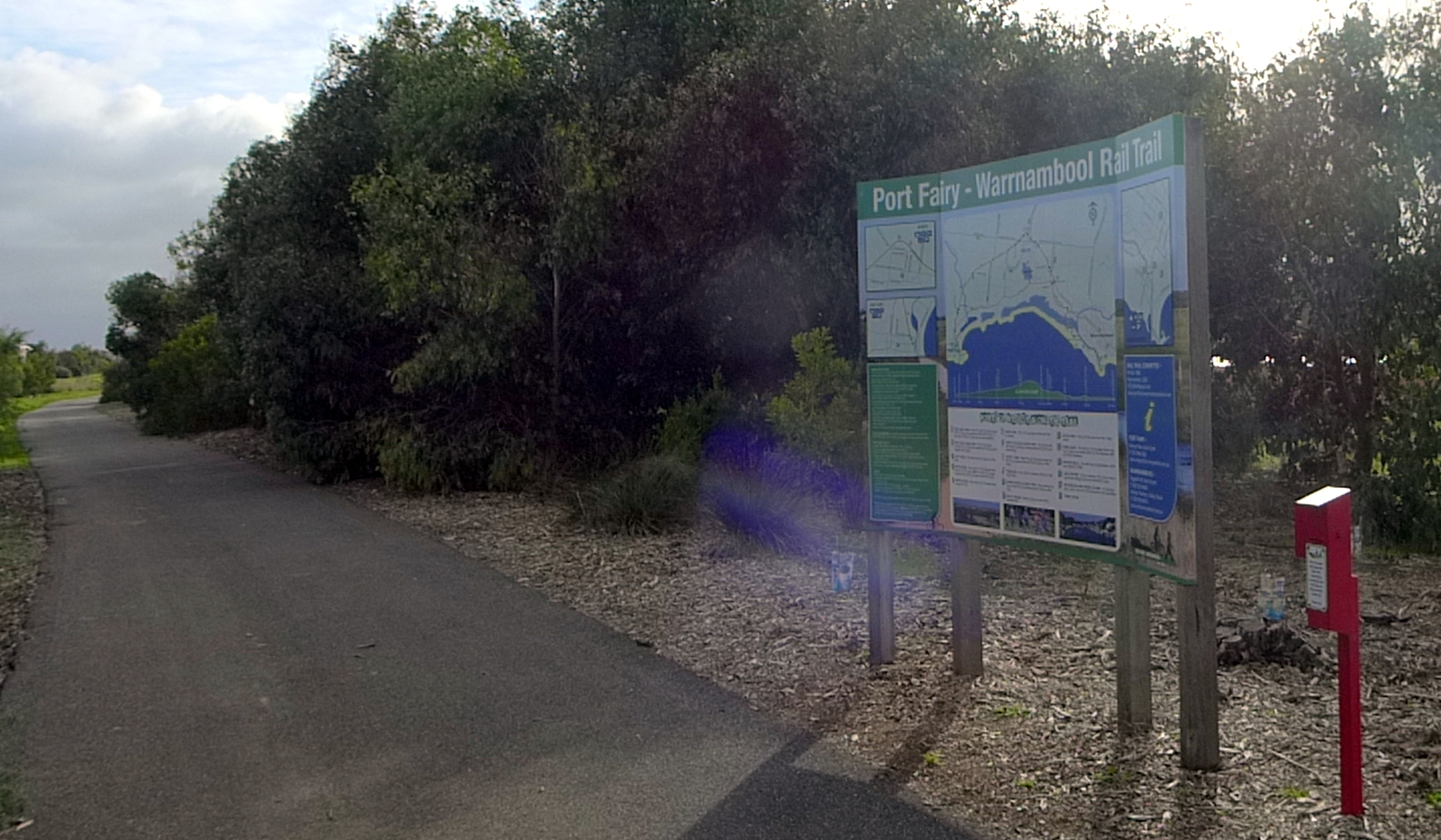
Information board, leaving Port Fairy.

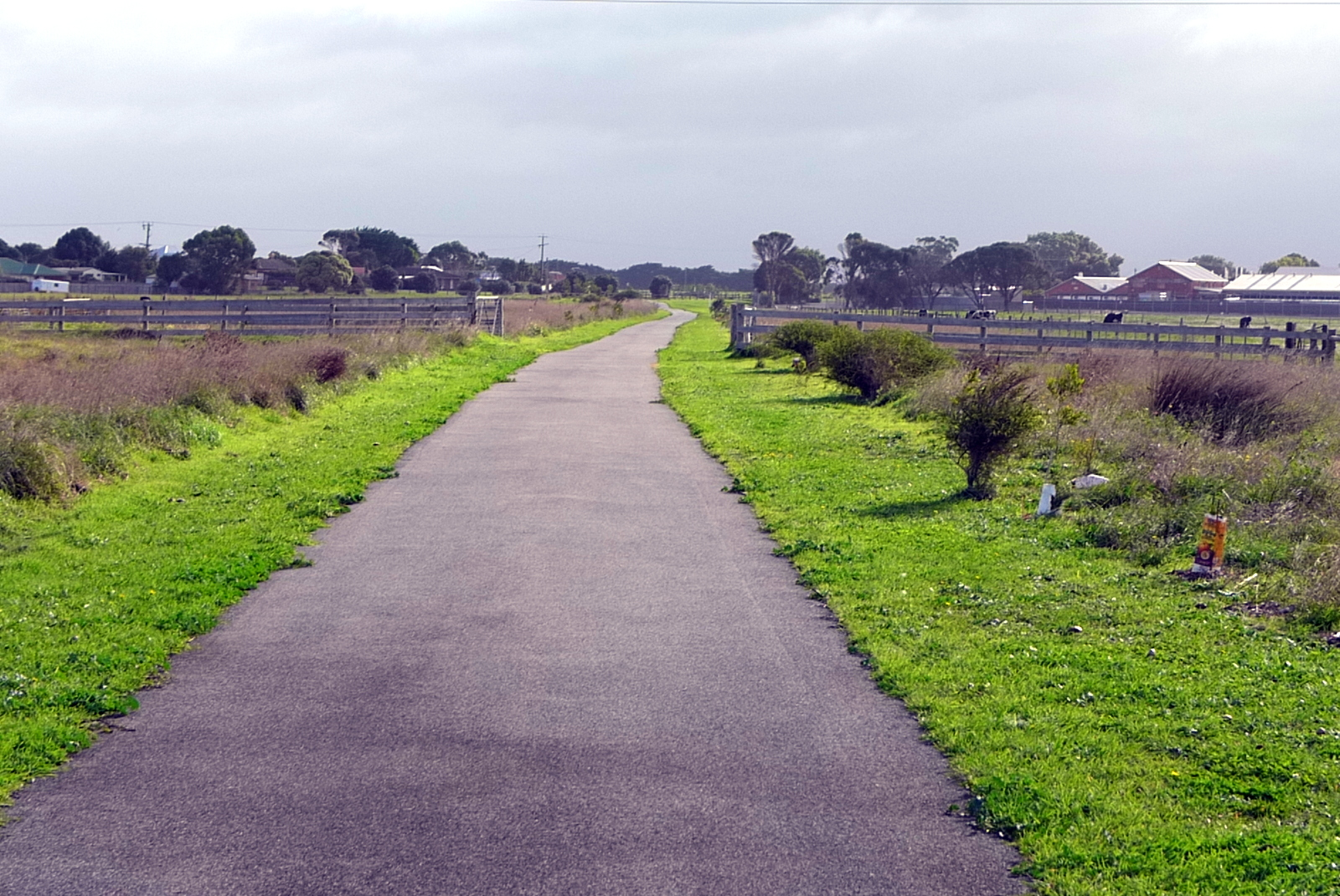

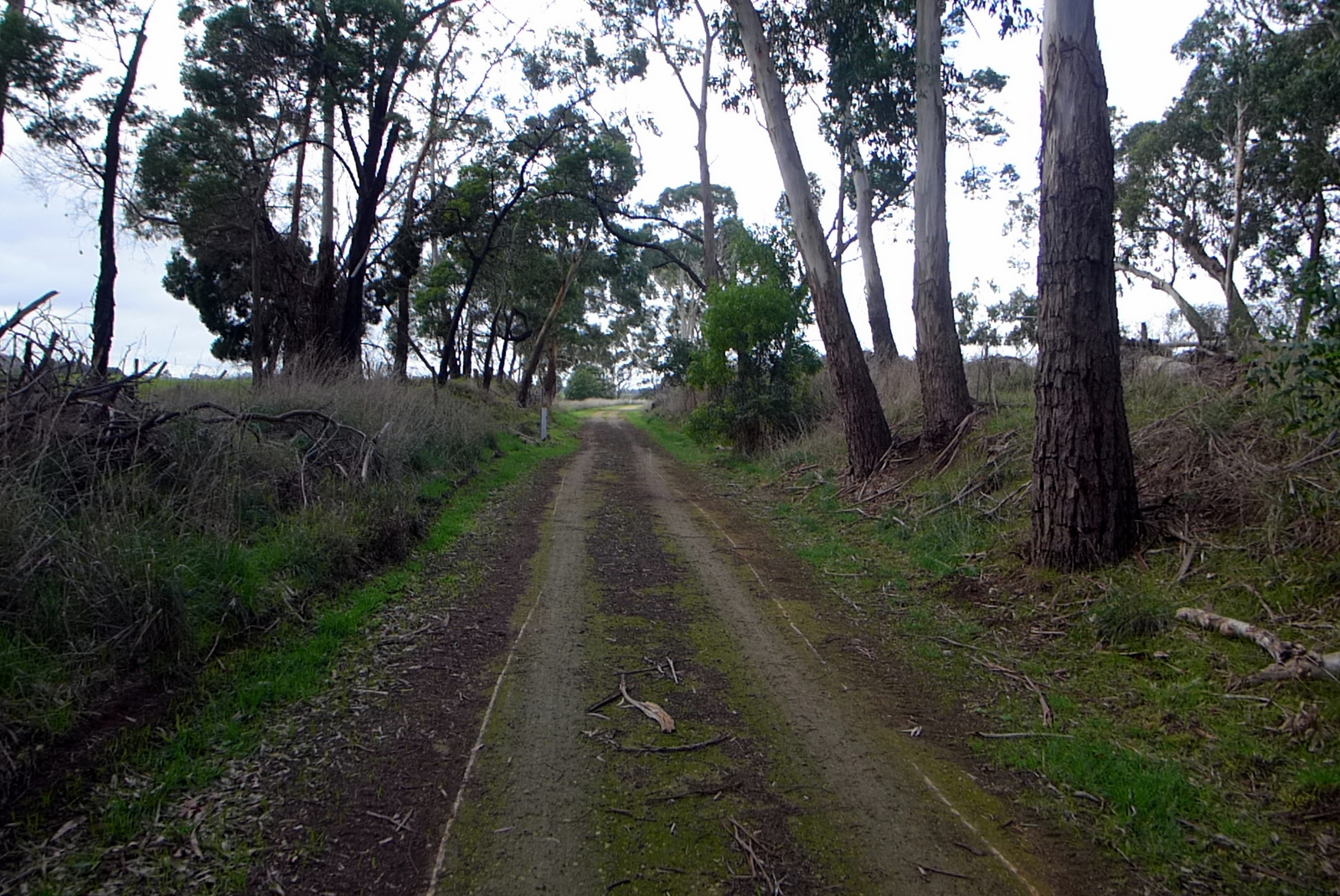
Remnant bushland, between Port Fairy and Koroit.

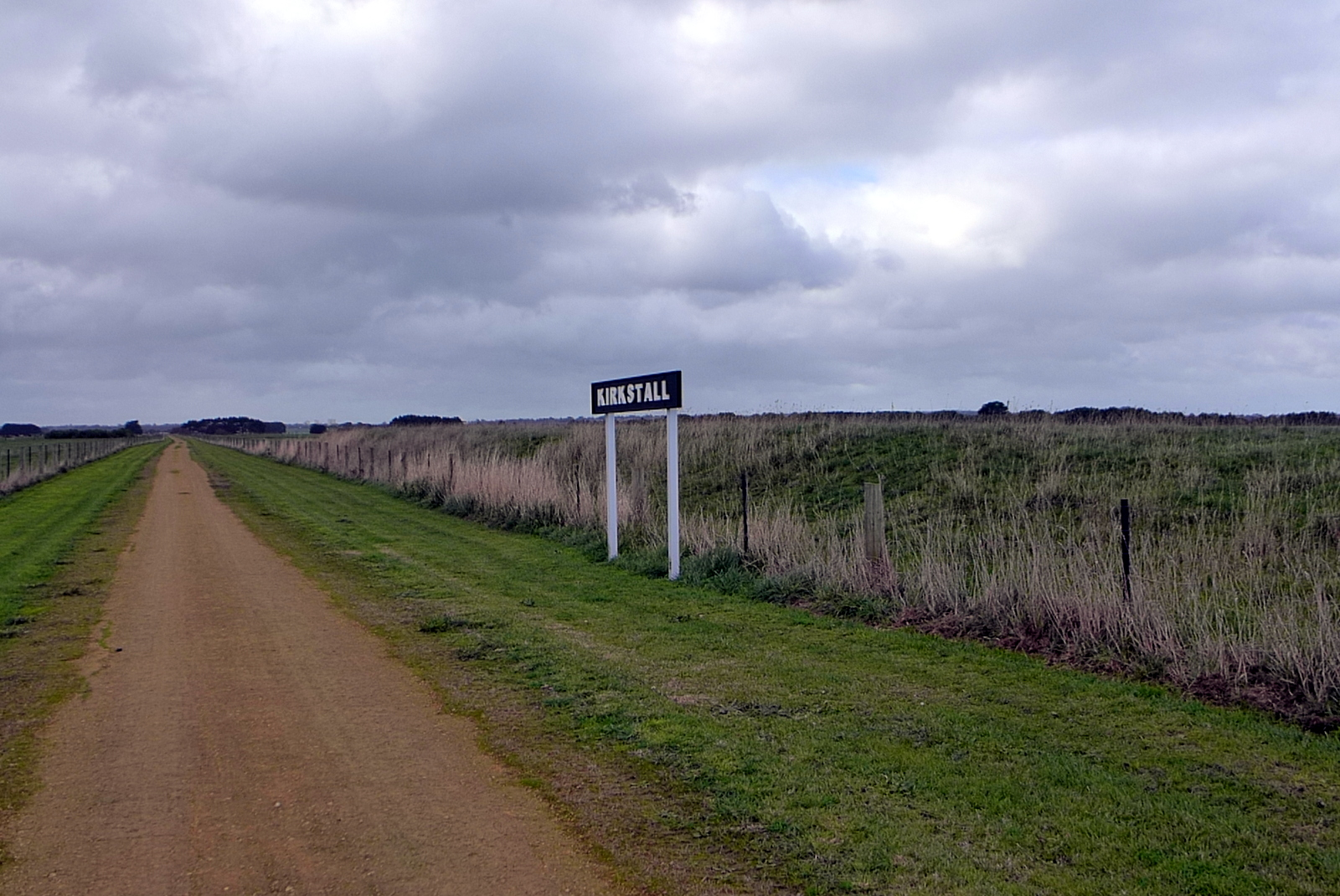
Kirkstall station site.

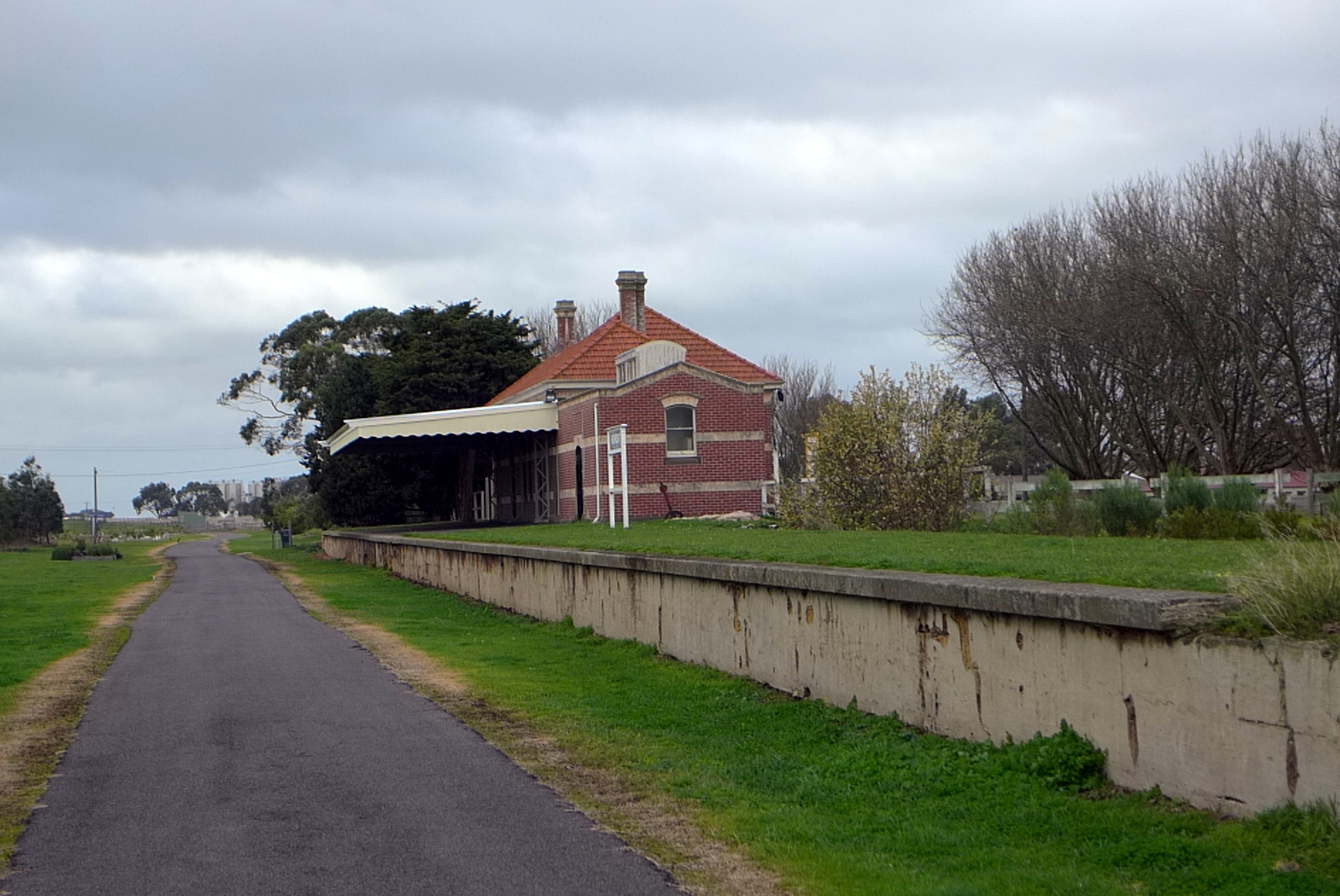
Koroit Station

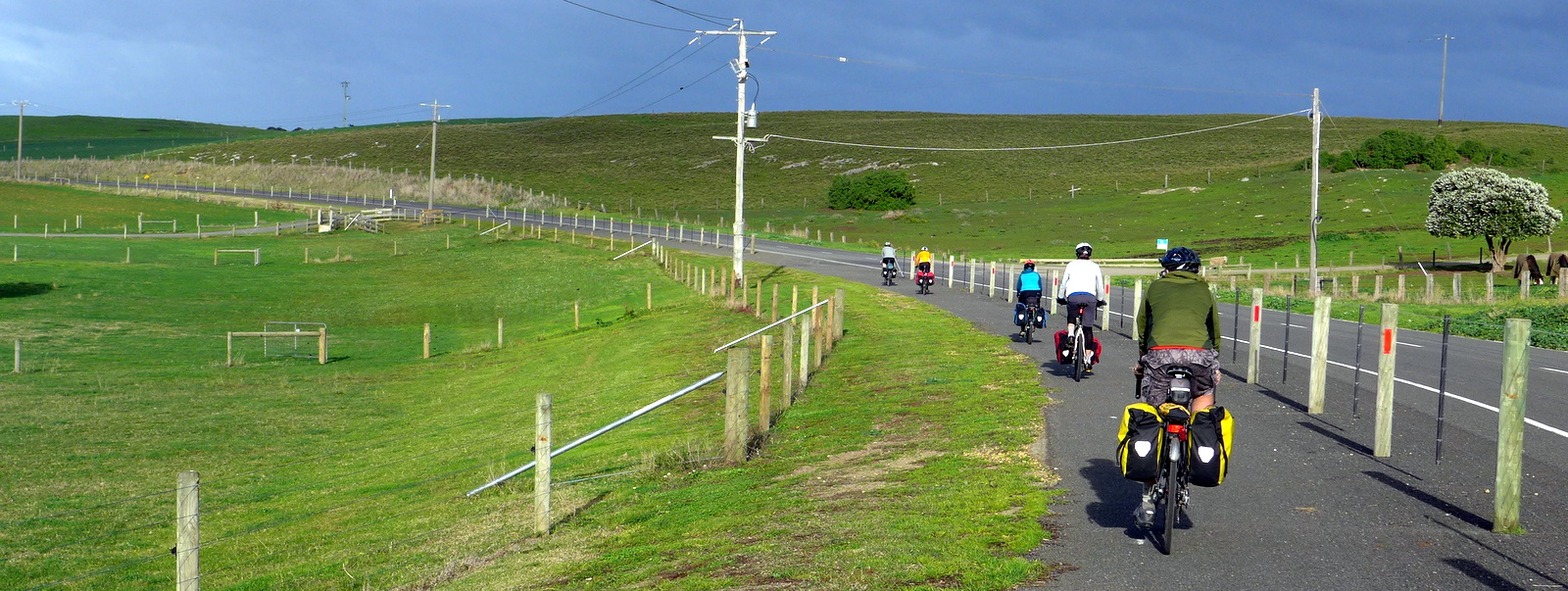
Ilowa Road.

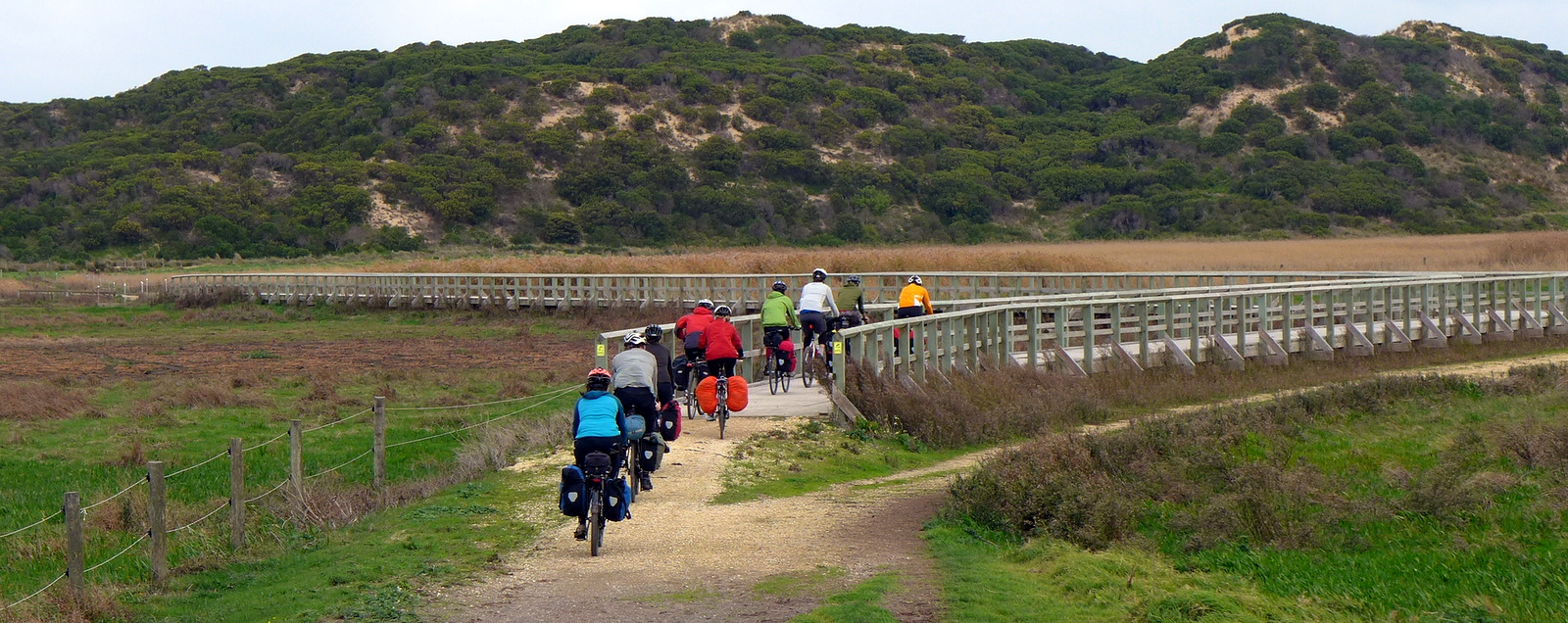
Kelly Swamp section.

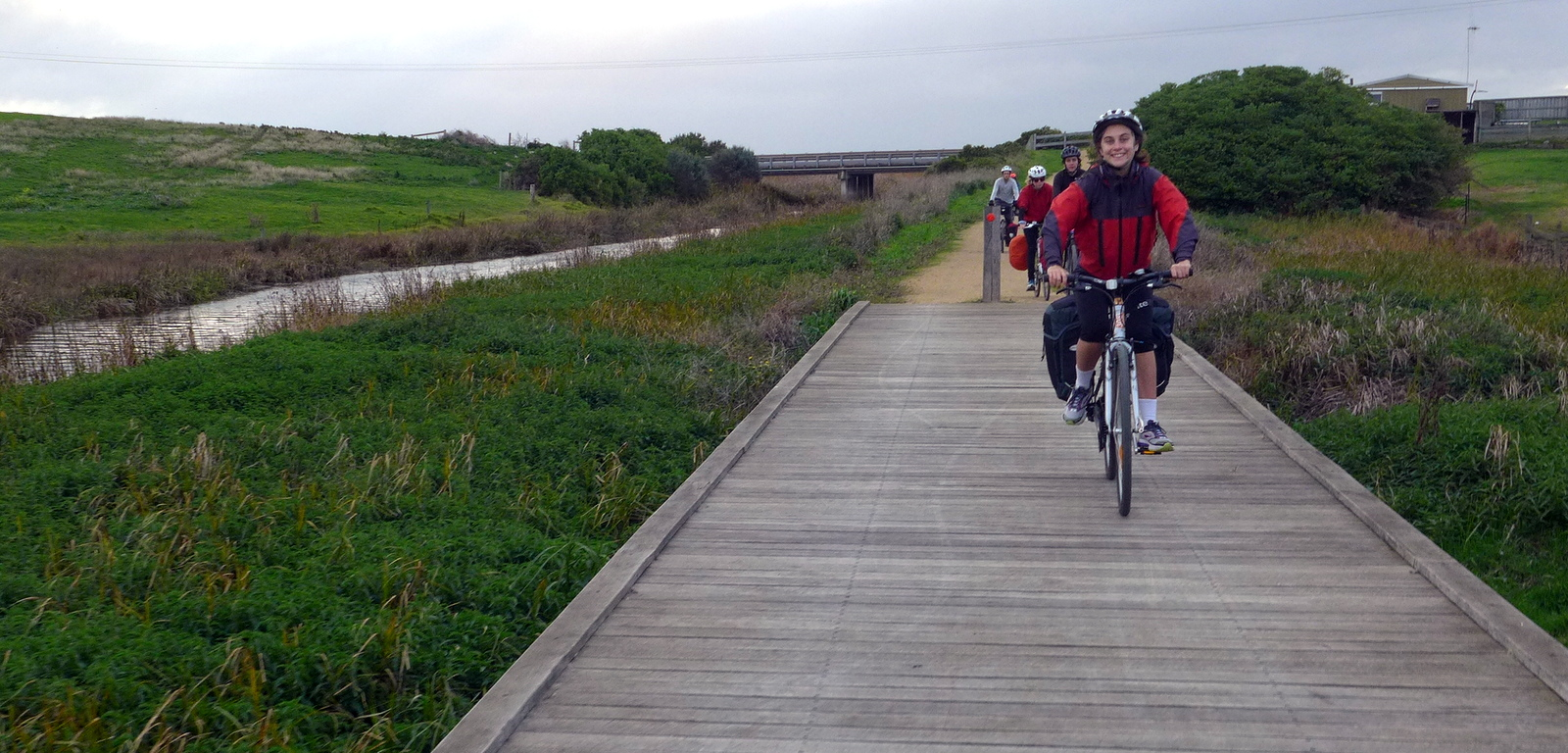
Outskirts of Warrnambool.
