= Mortlake railway line =

Former railway line in Victoria, Australia

Mortlake

Overview
- Stations: 3

Service
- Type: V/Line passenger service

History
- Closed: 1978

Technical
- Number of tracks: 1

The Mortlake line is a closed railway line in the west of Victoria, Australia. Branching off of the main Port Fairy railway line at Terang, then running North to the small town of Mortlake, Victoria.

== History ==
The original idea for a railway line serving Mortlake was first tabled in the 1870s. The line had been completed, but not used until 1889, when the Mortlake Despatch ran a newspaper article questioning why the line was not yet in operation. The line was officially opened on 4 February 1890. Soon after, additional facilities were provided, such as a windmill, 10 ton weighbridge and stockyards. The Koonendah Railway Station Post Office opened on 1 December 1890 but closed in 1891.

The line was closed to all traffic on Tuesday, 1 August 1978. Dismantling of the line occurred during May/June 1988.
