= Winchelsea railway station, Victoria =

Railway station in Victoria, Australia

Winchelsea
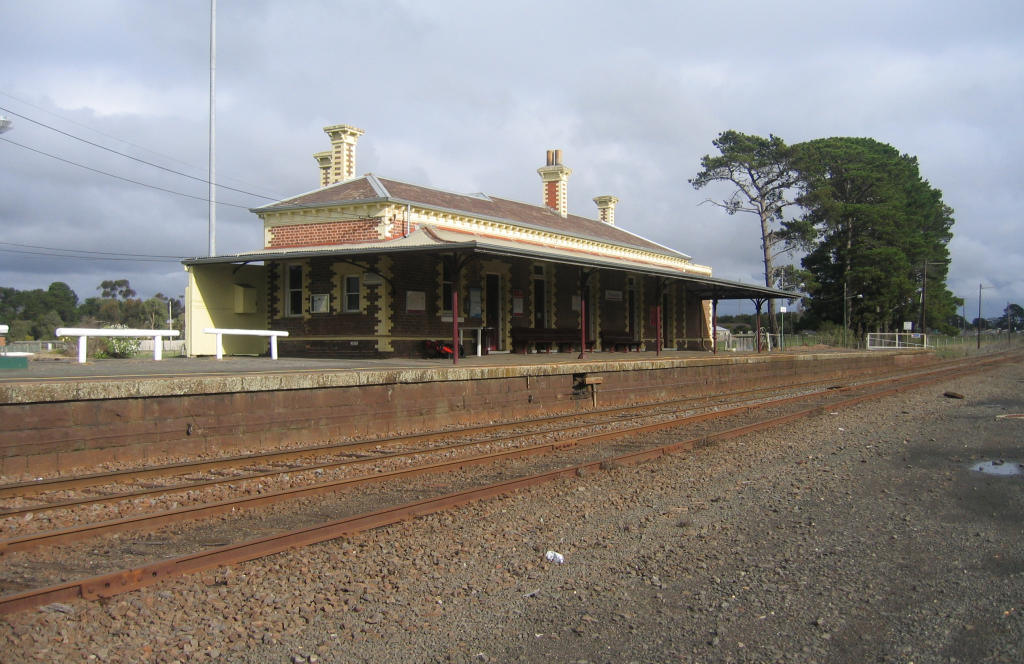
- Southbound view of the station building and platform, July 2005. Now-removed loop in the foreground

General information
- Location: Railway Terrace, Winchelsea, Victoria 3241; Shire of Surf Coast; Australia
- Coordinates: 38°14′25″S 143°59′2″E
- System: PTV regional rail station
- Owner: VicTrack
- Operator: V/Line
- Line: Warrnambool (Warrnambool)
- Distance: 113.74 kilometres from Southern Cross
- Platforms: 1
- Tracks: 1

Construction
- Structure type: Ground
- Parking: Yes
- Accessible: Yes

Other information
- Status: Operational, staffed part-time
- Station code: WIA
- Fare zone: Myki zone 7/8
- Website: Public Transport Victoria

History
- Opened: 25 November 1876; 149 years ago

Services
Five train services in each direction on weekdays
Three train services in each direction on weekends.
One bus service from Geelong to Colac on weekday afternoons.
Preceding station	V/Line	Following station
Waurn Ponds towards Southern Cross	Warrnambool line	Birregurra towards Warrnambool
Location
- Location within Victoria

Winchelsea railway station is located on the Warrnambool line in Victoria, Australia. It serves the town of the same name, and opened on 25 November 1876.

The station opened as the temporary terminus of the line from Geelong. On 13 March 1877, the line was extended to Birregurra.

In July 2008, the loop siding was removed, leaving the station straight-railed.

== Platforms and services ==
Winchelsea has one platform. It is served by V/Line Warrnambool line trains. It is also served by a bus running from Geelong to Colac on weekday afternoons.

Winchelsea platform arrangement
Platform	Line	Destination
1	Warrnambool line	Southern Cross, Warrnambool
