= Wensleydale railway line, Victoria =

Former railway line in Victoria, Australia

Wensleydale

Overview
- Stations: 4

Service
- Type: V/Line passenger service

History
- Opened: 1890
- Closed: 1947

Technical
- Line length: 18.00 km
- Number of tracks: Single

The Wensleydale railway line was a railway branch line in Victoria, Australia. It ran for approximately 18 km from the Port Fairy railway line near Moriac, to Wensleydale, Victoria. It was opened in March 1890 and was used to transport firewood, gravel and brown coal out of the area. Apart from troop trains during World War II the line saw very little traffic and was closed in 1948.
