= Tandarra, Victoria =

Tandarra
- Town
- Coordinates: 36°25′54″S 144°13′10″E
- Country: Australia
- State: Victoria
- LGA: Shire of Loddon

Government
  - State electorate: Bendigo East
  - Federal division: Mallee

Population
  - Total: 55 (2021 census)
- Postcode: 3571
Localities around Tandarra
Pompapiel	Dingee	Kamarooka North
Auchmore	Tandarra	Kamarooka
Auchmore	Raywood	Kamarooka

Tandarra is a locality in the Shire of Loddon, Victoria, Australia. At the 2021 census, Tandarra had a population of 55.

== History ==
Tandarra was named after the pastoral run of the same name which was taken up by John Aitken in 1846. The place name is thought to originate from an Aboriginal term for a camping place. Tandarra railway station opened on 21 June 1883 as "Yallock", was renamed "Tandarra" in 1889, and served the Piangil railway line until it closed to passengers in 1968, when the platform was removed. Tandarra State School opened in 1880 and closed in 1950, when it was amalgamated into Loddon East State School (now East Loddon P12 College) along with other schools in the area.

Throughout its history, Tandarra has been plagued by droughts, bushfires and floods. Beginning on 24 September 1916, Tandarra experienced significant flooding following a fall of about 115.8 mm of rain. Overflowing creeks inundated thousands of acres of wheat and grassland, threatening crop losses. Water around Tandarra railway station rose to about 0.9 metres, submerging nearby wheat stacks containing roughly 6,000 bags. Floodwaters also crossed the railway line north of the station, causing minor washaways that required emergency repairs before services could resume the following morning. Several commercial buildings narrowly avoided inundation, while others suffered internal flooding of up to 0.6 metres. The Bendigo Advertiser stated that "One thing that the floods have made evident is that the subway of the main channels are far too small for carrying the flood waters" and called for improvements to protect surrounding farmland.
