= Raywood =

Raywood may refer to:

- Raywood, Aldgate, South Australia, heritage-listed home and gardens
- Raywood, Victoria, Australia
  - Raywood railway station
- Raywood, Texas, United States
