= PYD =

PYD or pyd may refer to:

- "PYD" (song), a 2013 single by Justin Bieber
- Democratic Union Party (Syria) (Partiya Yekîtiya Demokrat), a Kurdish Syrian political party
- Pyrin domain (PYD), or the protein domain
- Positive youth development
- .pyd, a file extension for the Python programming language
- Pyramid railway station, Australia
