= Bendigo line (disambiguation) =

Bendigo line is a regional passenger rail service operated by V/Line in Victoria, Australia.

Bendigo line may alao refer to:

- Deniliquin railway line in Victoria, Australia, also known as the Echuca railway line
- Piangil railway line in Victoria, Australia, also known as the Swan Hill railway line
