= Dingee railway station =

Railway station in Victoria, Australia

Dingee
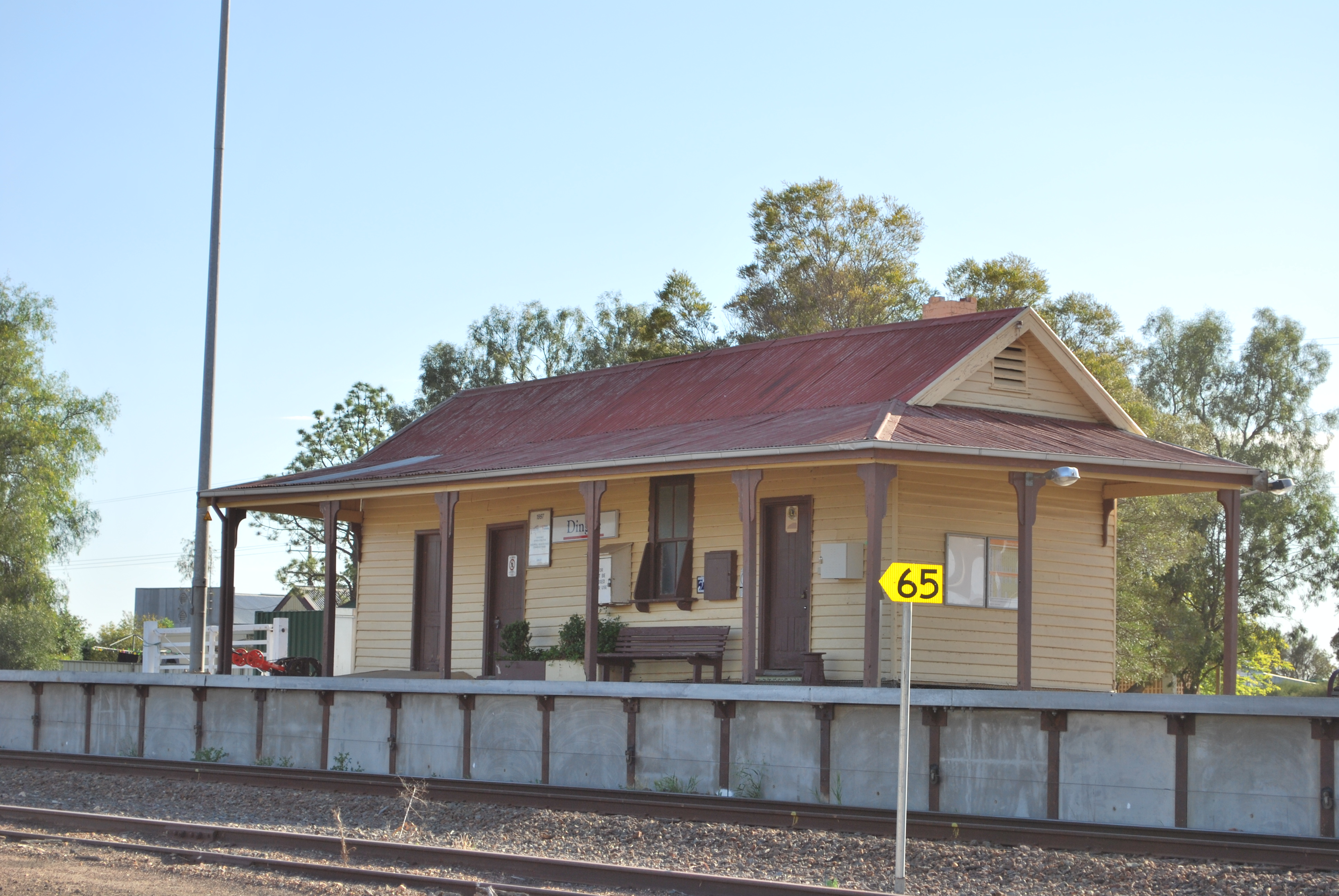
- Eastbound view of the station building, October 2008

General information
- Location: Bendigo–Pyramid Road, Dingee, Victoria 3571; Shire of Loddon; Australia
- Coordinates: 36°22′09″S 144°13′52″E
- System: PTV regional rail station
- Owner: VicTrack
- Operator: V/Line
- Line: Swan Hill (Piangil)
- Distance: 211.34 kilometres from Southern Cross
- Platforms: 1
- Tracks: 2

Construction
- Structure type: At-grade
- Accessible: Yes

Other information
- Status: Operational, unstaffed
- Station code: DGE
- Fare zone: Myki zone 17
- Website: Public Transport Victoria

History
- Opened: 21 June 1883; 143 years ago
- Former names: Talambe (June–October 1883)

Services
Two daily services in both directions.
Preceding station	V/Line	Following station
Raywood towards Southern Cross	Swan Hill line	Pyramid towards Swan Hill
Former service
Preceding station	Disused railways	Following station
Raywood	Piangil line	Mitiamo
Location
- Location within Victoria

Dingee railway station is located on the Piangil line in Victoria, Australia. It serves the town of Dingee, and it opened on 21 June 1883 as Talambe. It was renamed Dingee on 15 October 1883. Dingee railway station is the least used railway station in Victoria.

== History ==
Dingee opened on 21 June 1883, after the line from Raywood was extended to Mitiamo. The station, like the township itself, was named after an Aboriginal word meaning star.

The station was destroyed by fire on 7 March 1944.

The former Public Transport Corporation had plans to sell the station in 1992, however this did not eventuate.

The recently reopened Raywood station is located between Dingee and Eaglehawk, while disused station Mitiamo is located between Dingee and Pyramid.

Dingee Railway Station is the least used railway station in Victoria, recording 250 passenger movements in the 2020/21 financial year, less than 1 passenger per day.

== Platforms and services ==
Dingee has one platform. It is serviced by V/Line Swan Hill line services.

Dingee platform arrangement
Platform	Line	Destination	Via	Source
1	Swan Hill line	Southern Cross, Swan Hill	Bendigo	
