= Kerang train accident =

2007 collision in Victoria, Australia

Coordinates: 35°42′05″S 143°52′47″E

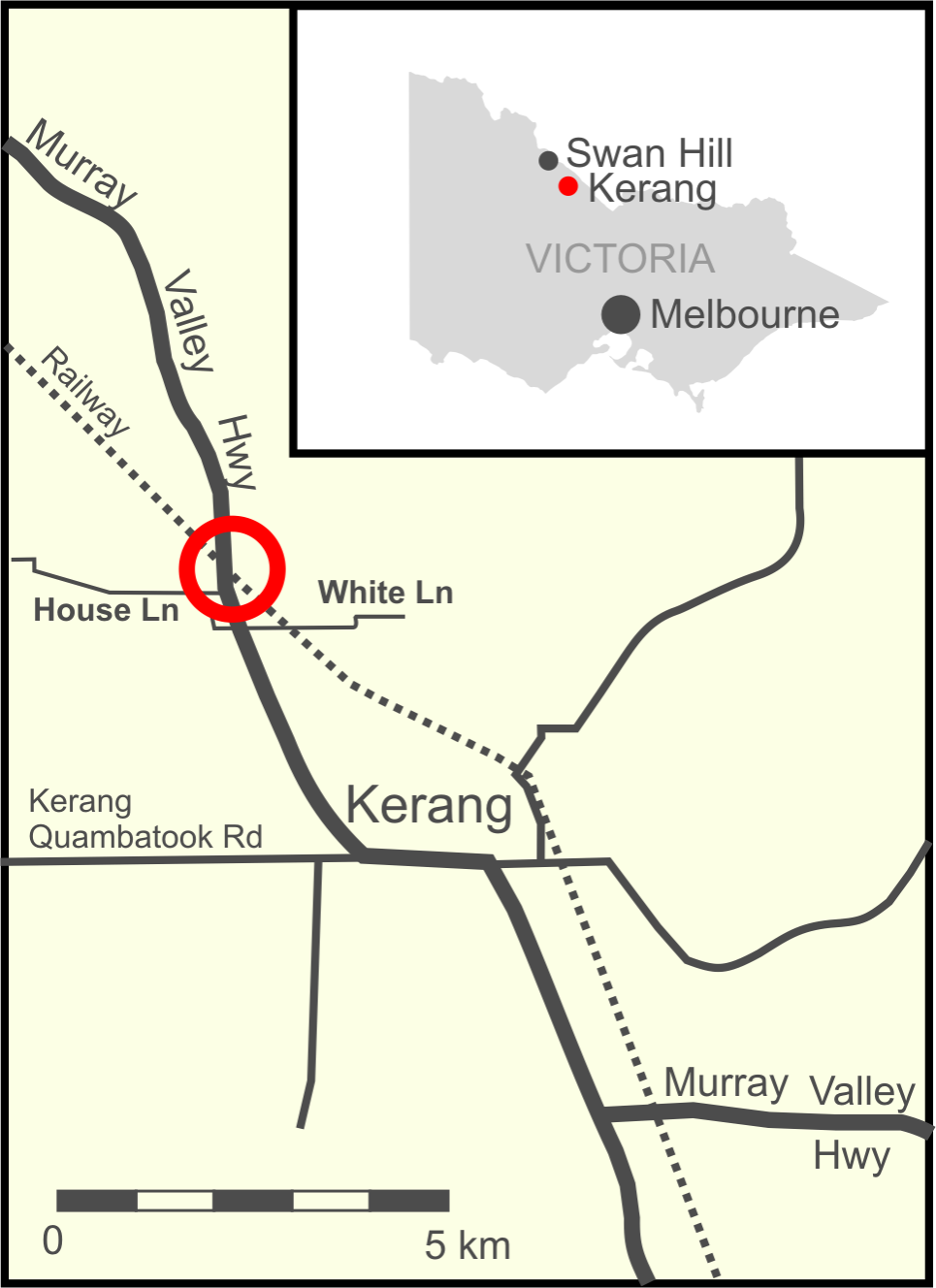

Details
- Date: 5 June 2007; 13:40
- Location: Kerang, Victoria; 257.2 km (159.8 mi) NNW from Melbourne
- Country: Australia
- Line: Piangil railway line
- Operator: V/Line
- Incident type: Level crossing collision
- Cause: Truck driver error

Statistics
- Trains: 1
- Passengers: 36
- Deaths: 11
- Injured: 23

The Kerang train accident occurred on 5 June 2007 at about 13:40 AEST in the Australian state of Victoria, approximately 6 kilometres (3.7 mi) north of the town of Kerang in the state's northwest, and 257 kilometres (160 mi) north-northwest of the city of Melbourne.

Victoria Police confirmed that 11 people were killed and 23 injured in the crash, making this to date the deadliest Australian rail disaster since 1977. As of 11:00 am on 6 June, two passengers remained unaccounted for. The site was visited on the evening of 5 June by the Premier of Victoria, Steve Bracks, who called it a "horrific scene".

== Background ==
=== Level crossing ===
The Murray Valley Highway crosses the Piangil railway line about 6 km (3.7 mi) north-west of the town of Kerang. The level crossing at this location, numbered Y2943, was protected prior to the accident by warning signs, road markings, flashing lights and warning bells, all of which were later found to be operational at the time of the crash.

The highway is a single-carriageway, two-lane bitumen road, with a gentle curve about 300 m (980 ft) prior to the level crossing when approaching from the south. At the level crossing, the speed limit was 100 km/h (62 mph). The railway is a single line with a speed limit of 90 km/h (56 mph) for passenger trains.

One fatal crash had previously occurred at the crossing, in 1995, but a database maintained by Transport Safety Victoria had recorded a number of near misses between rail and road vehicles in the months leading up to the 2007 accident.

=== Train ===
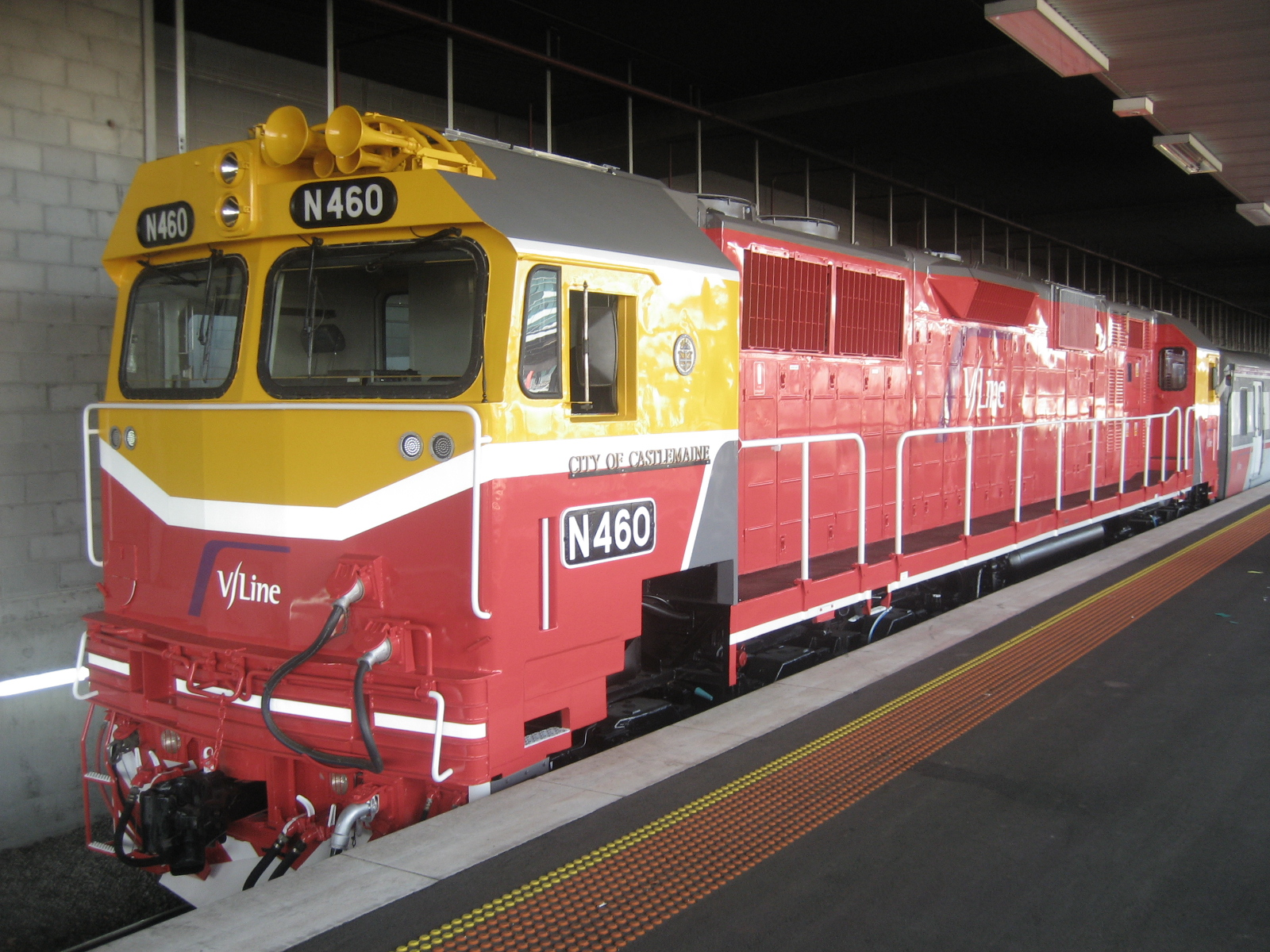
N460 "City of Castlemaine" pictured some months after the accident, in 2008. N460 is one of 6 N Class locomotives still in service with V/Line

Southbound V/Line passenger train 8042 was a regularly scheduled passenger service from Swan Hill to Southern Cross, Melbourne. The train consisted of N class locomotive N460, named "City of Castlemaine", and three N-Type carriages, designated set N7: ACN21, a first class carriage; BRN20, an economy class carriage with buffet facilities; and BN19, a second economy carriage. It departed Swan Hill at 1.00 pm with a scheduled arrival time in Kerang of 1.39 p.m.

The train was crewed by a fully qualified V/Line driver from Melbourne, and two conductors, one from Bendigo and the other from Melbourne, who were jointly responsible for passenger services and operating the buffet.

Thirty-four passengers were on board at the time of the accident: 6 in the leading carriage, ACN21, 21 in BRN20, and seven at the rear of the train in BN19.

=== Truck ===
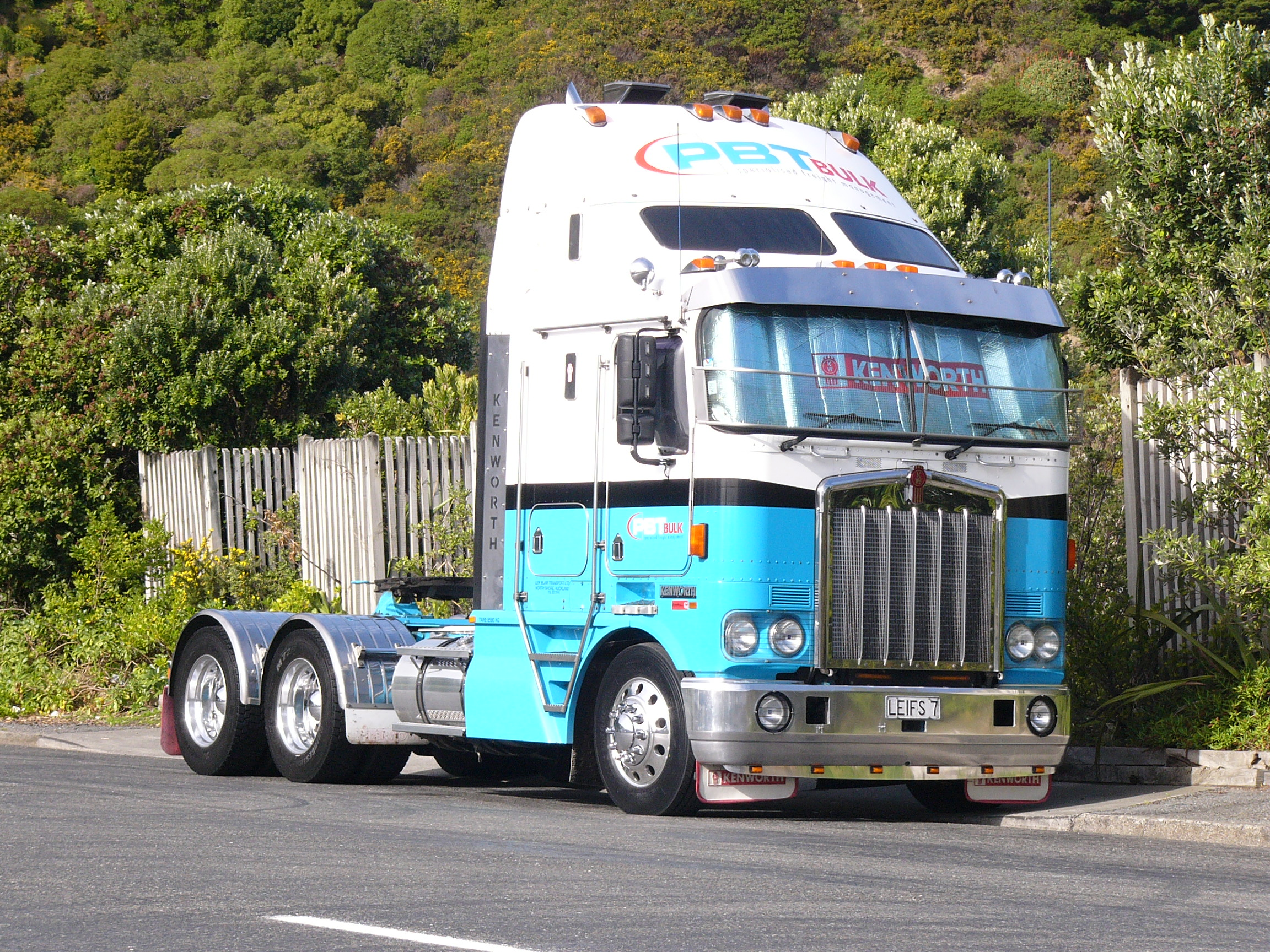
A Kenworth K104 similar to the prime mover involved in the accident.

The semi-trailer truck involved in the accident consisted of a refrigerated curtain sided trailer hauled by a Kenworth K104B prime mover. Its driver, Christiaan Scholl, was transporting a load of timber and pipe fittings from Victoria to South Australia on behalf of Canny Carrying Company.

On 5 June, Scholl departed Wangaratta about 90 minutes later than was usual for his cross-border trip. It was usual for him to cross the railway line at Kerang around noon.

== Incident ==
The train involved in the accident was a locomotive-hauled service from Swan Hill that departed for Melbourne at 13:00, operated by an N class locomotive and three car N type carriage set. The collision caused the closure of nearby sections of the Murray Valley Highway.

Southbound V/Line passenger train service 8042, which consisted of locomotive N460 and carriage set N7, was run into by a northbound semi-trailer truck, at a level crossing where the Piangil railway line crosses the Murray Valley Highway. The locomotive and first carriage escaped impact as the truck swerved left. However, the second carriage and third carriages were both struck, severely damaging the carriages and killing 11 passengers.

Given that the truck had a mass of about 40 tonnes, and had been travelling at 100 km/h, its impact was devastating. The truck, owned by the Canny Carrying Company of Wangaratta and driven by Christiaan Scholl, was extensively damaged on impact with the carriages, although Scholl only sustained shoulder and head injuries.

One survivor recalled, "A lady sitting across from me saw the truck and closed her eyes. You just wonder how anybody got out."

Ursula McGuinnes, general manager of Stakeholder Relations for V/Line, noted that the level crossing was protected with lights and bells, which were still sounding and flashing when emergency services arrived, but did not have boom gates.

According to Kerang resident and Shire of Gannawarra councillor Lui Basile, there had been a recent timetable change on the line.

On 15 February 2008, the Office of the Chief Investigator, Department of Infrastructure, released Rail Safety Report 2007/09, detailing the findings of the investigation into the collision. The report noted that the train, truck, and level crossing warning signals were all serviceable prior to the incident, and both the train and truck driver were familiar with their respective routes. The report noted that the truck driver did not agree to be interviewed by investigators, and concluded that: "For reasons not determined the truck driver did not respond in an adequate time and manner to the level crossing warning devices."

== Response ==
Emergency response was swift, with a number of seriously injured people airlifted to Melbourne, while others were taken by road or air ambulance to nearby Kerang Hospital. The aftermath of the crash and the treatment of a patient was shown in episodes of Medical Emergency. The State Premier Steve Bracks flew to the crash scene on the evening of 5 June with the Victoria Police Assistant Commissioner Noel Ashby and the Opposition transport spokesman Terry Mulder, calling it a "horrific scene".

Both the Federal Minister for Transport and Regional Services Mark Vaile and the Prime Minister John Howard spoke to the media, offering Federal government aid to families as well as the investigative assistance of the Australian Transport Safety Bureau. Leader of the Opposition Kevin Rudd said that he was "saddened and shocked" by the incident and went on to say that his "thoughts and prayers tonight are with those still fighting for their life in hospitals throughout Victoria."

V/Line announced it would support a full inquiry and had arranged counselling for the passengers and their families. Chief executive Rob Barnett said the incident would raise questions about the safety of level crossings, but asked everyone to resist jumping to conclusions. Buses replaced trains between Bendigo and Swan Hill until the crash site was cleared and the site released by accident investigators.

Due to the nature of land surrounding the accident site, some earthworks were required to provide a solid footing for the heavy lifting equipment needed to remove the rolling stock damaged in the accident. Once removed from the line, the damaged rolling stock was transported to Melbourne for further investigation, with some of the carriages still in storage in 2008.

The driver of the semi-trailer, Christiaan Scholl, was charged with one count of culpable driving and on 7 June was bailed to appear before Bendigo Magistrates Court on 19 December. A police spokesman stated that more charges were expected to be laid in due course. On 18 August 2008, Scholl was committed for trial on 11 charges of causing death by culpable driving and 8 charges of causing injury by negligent driving. His trial began in Bendigo on 26 May 2009. On 13 June 2009, he was found not guilty on all charges. A group of crash victims indicated they would pursue a civil action against Scholl. One of the train's conductors settled his claim against Scholl out of court in 2011 for an undisclosed sum of money.

== Inquest ==
An inquiry into the Kerang rail disaster was due to begin on 18 January 2011, but was delayed by a day due to flooding in the region. The inquest began on 19 January at the Coroner's Court in Bendigo. After a minute's silence, coroner Dr Jane Hendtlass heard evidence from the driver of the train. The inquest was scheduled to run over 58 days.

The inquest ultimately investigated 15 other deaths at Victorian level crossings. Its findings were released on 21 October 2013, and included recommendations that V/Line's emergency procedure and training be improved, that level crossing design be revisited to examine the best ways to alert drivers to approaching trains, and that better records be kept of level crossing incidents.

== See also ==
- Railway accidents in Victoria
- List of disasters in Australia by death toll
- List of level crossing accidents

== Bibliography ==
- Level Crossing Collision V/Line Passenger Train 8042 and a Truck Near Kerang, Victoria 5 June 2007 (PDF). Chief Investigator, Transport and Marine Safety Investigations. 15 February 2008. Archived from the original (PDF) on 27 March 2018.
- Coronial Investigation of Twenty-six Rail Crossing Deaths in Victoria, Australia (PDF). Coroners Court of Victoria. October 2013. Archived from the original (PDF) on 21 October 2013.
