= Mitiamo railway station =

Former railway station in Victoria, Australia

Coordinates: 36°12′37″S 144°13′46″E

Mitiamo
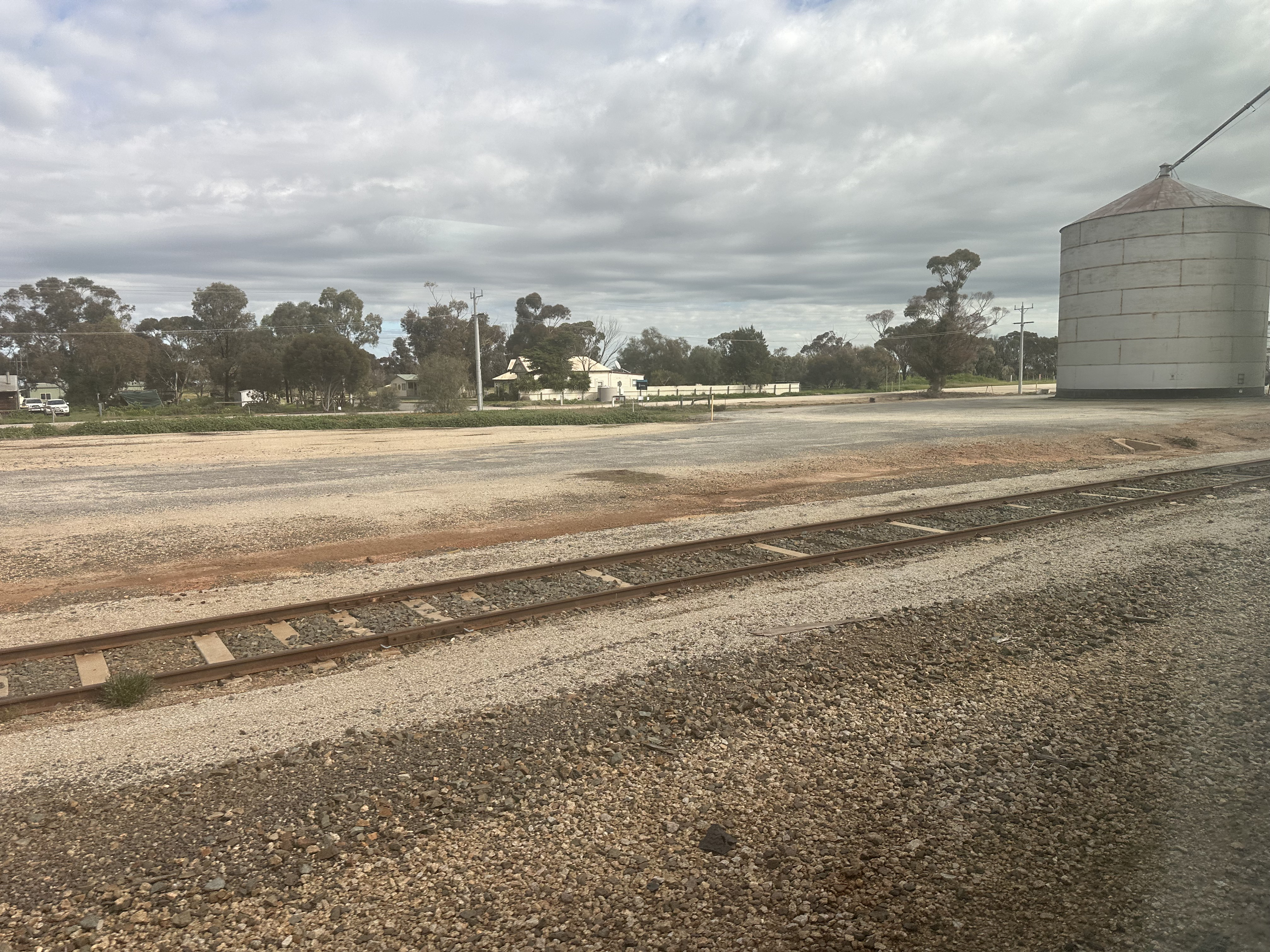
- Former station site in August 2026

General information
- Line: Yungera
- Platforms: 1
- Tracks: 1

Other information
- Status: Closed

History
- Closed: 4 October 1981

Services
Preceding station	Disused railways	Following station
Dingee	Yungera line	Pyramid
	List of closed railway stations in Victoria	
Location

Mitiamo railway station was located on the Yungera line, serving the Victoria town of Mitiamo. The station closed to passenger traffic on 4 October 1981 as part of the New Deal timetable for country passengers.

Prior to its 1981 closure, Mitiamo was abolished as a staff station in 1978, and was replaced with the section Dingee – Pyramid.

However, in 1986 the grain loading facilities were declared a Central Receiving Point, and thus upgraded such that 20 VHGY bogie grain wagons could be loaded with grain; the new sidings were constructed on a slope so that each wagon could be loaded then pushed with gravity assistance, without needing a rail tractor or locomotive to shunt the yard. Two new steel silos were provided, each with 10,000 m^{3} (350,000 cu ft) grain capacity, providing a loading capacity of 480 t (470 long tons; 530 short tons) per hour.
