= Dingee =

- Town
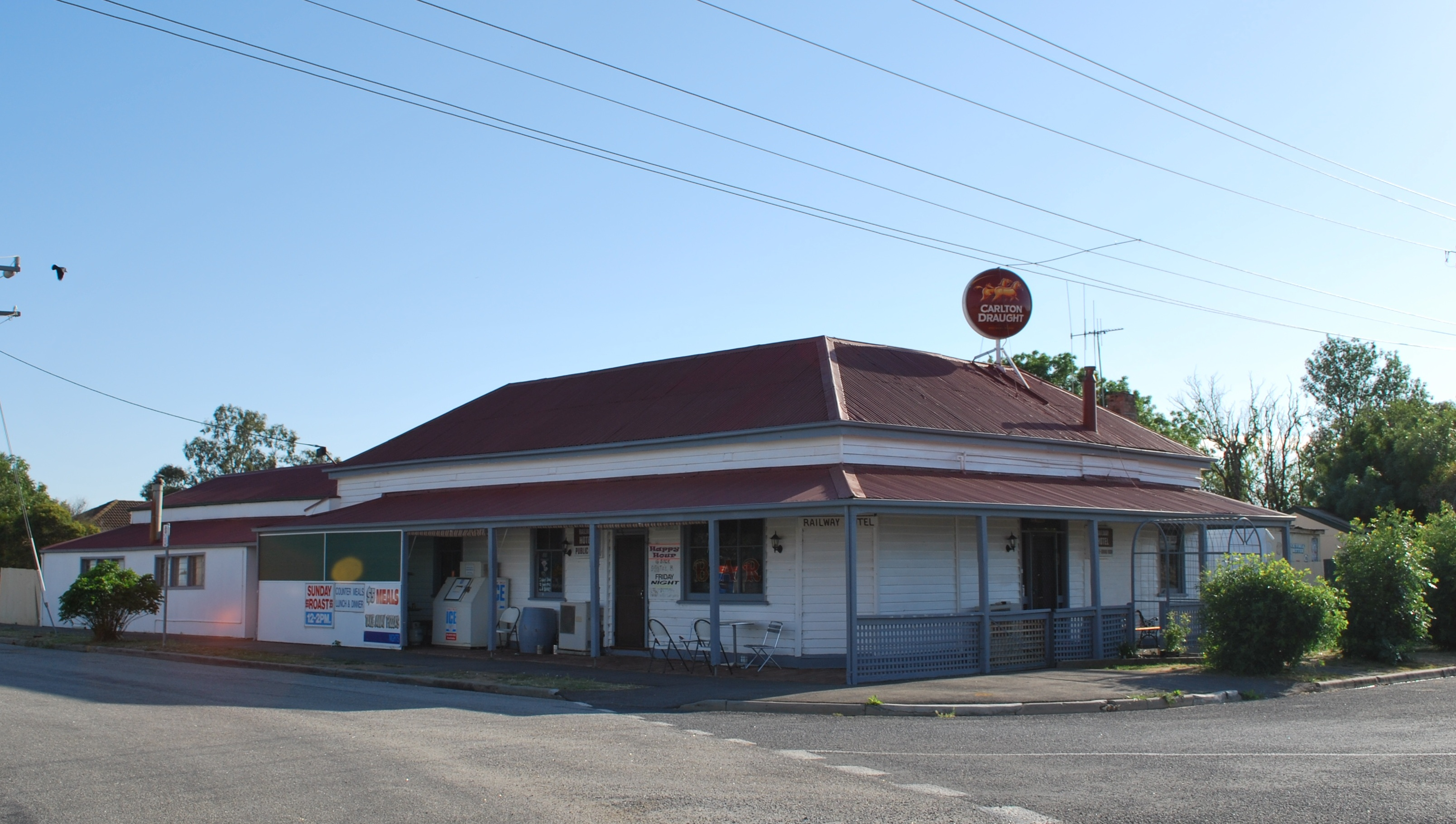
- Railway Hotel

- Coordinates: 36°22′0″S 144°13′0″E
- Country: Australia
- State: Victoria
- LGA: Shire of Loddon
- Location: 204 km (127 mi) N of Melbourne; 49 km (30 mi) N of Bendigo, Victoria

Government
  - State electorate: Bendigo East, Northern Victoria
  - Federal division: Mallee

Population
  - Total: 195 (2021 census)
- Postcode: 3571

Dingee is a town in northern Victoria, Australia. The town is located in the Shire of Loddon, 204 kilometres (127 mi) north of the state capital, Melbourne. At the 2021 census, Dingee and the surrounding area had a population of 195.

Dingee Post Office opened on 12 December 1883, on the arrival of the railway and the opening of Dingee station.

Golfers play at the Calival Golf Club at Dingee.

Dingee is home to Victoria's least patronised station as of the 2024-2025 financial year. Dingee is served by the Swan Hill line from Dingee station as well as a V/Line coach service to Mildura on Thursdays, or to Swan Hill on Fridays. On the other direction, there are coach services to Bendigo on Thursdays and Fridays, which connect to Melbourne train services.
