= VicRail N type carriage =

Intercity passenger carriage used on the railways of Victoria, Australia

N type carriage
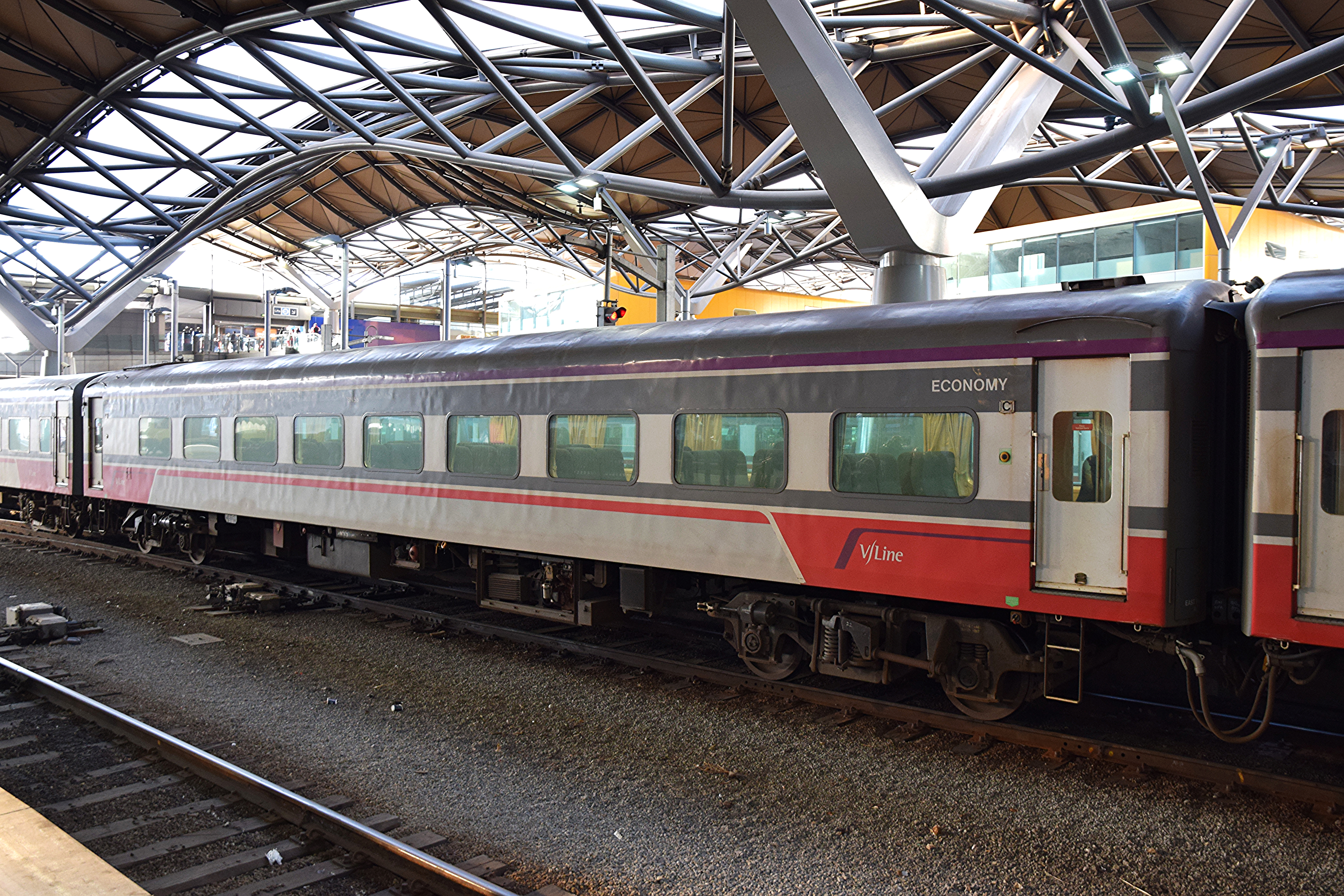
- Economy-class carriage at Southern Cross station, 2016

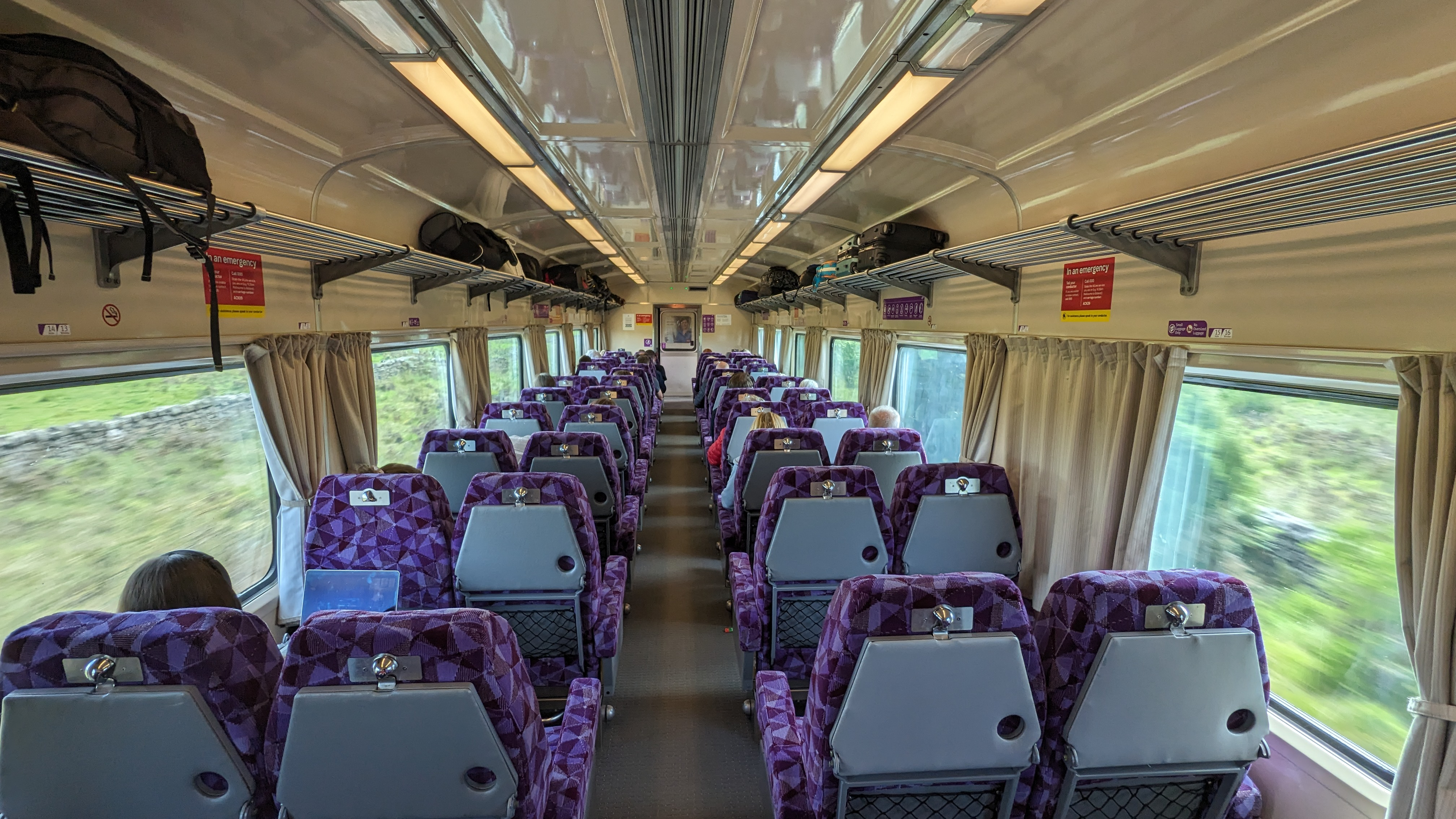
- First-class carriage interior, 2023
- In service: 1981–current
- Manufacturer: VicRail
- Built at: Newport Workshops
- Replaced: E type carriages
- Constructed: 1981–1984
- Entered service: 1981
- Refurbished: 2007–2013
- Number built: 57
- Number in service: 12
- Number preserved: 33
- Number scrapped: 1: (BRN20) Accident damage
- Formation: Originally BN-BN-ACN then BN-BRN-ACN, some sets with additional BZN & BTN cars. On standard gauge only, BN-BN-BDN-BRN-ACN.
- Diagram: B-14 (BN), B-15 (BRN), A-9 (ACN)
- Fleet numbers: BN 1–2, 4–5, 7–8, 10–11, 13–14, 16–17, 19, 22–23, 25–26, 28 & 55 BRN 20, 29, 31–32, 34–35, 37–38, 40–41, 43–44, 46–47, 49–50, 52–53 & 56 ACN 3, 6, 9, 12, 15, 18, 21, 24, 27, 30, 33, 36, 39, 42, 45, 48, 51, 54 & 57 BDN 6, 21 & 50
- Capacity: 88 economy passengers (BN), 81 economy passengers (BRN), 52 first class passengers (ACN)
- Operators: V/Line Passenger; previously V/Line. Also operated by V/Line on behalf of Hoys Roadlines
- Depot: Newport Workshops
- Line served: Swan Hill

Specifications
- Car body construction: 22458 mm
- Car length: 22860 mm
- Width: 2972 mm
- Height: 4065 mm
- Articulated sections: Rubber corridor connectors
- Wheelbase: 20046 mm total; 4890 mm per bogie
- Maximum speed: 115 km/h
- Weight: 44 tonnes (BRN), 43 tonnes (BN & ACN)
- Axle load: 11 tonnes (BRN), 10.75 tonnes (BN & ACN)
- Power supply: 415 V AC diesel alternators, later head-end power
- Bogies: 16156 mm centres
- Braking system: Westinghouse
- Coupling system: Autocouplers
- Track gauge: 1,600 mm (5 ft 3 in) & 1,435 mm (4 ft 8 1/2 in)

The N type carriages are an intercity passenger carriage used on the railways of Victoria, Australia. They were introduced between 1981 and 1984 as part of the 'New Deal' reforms of country passenger rail services. Today they are seen on V/Line long distance InterCity services to Swan Hill.

The carriage sets have both first class 2+2 seating, and 2+3 economy seating. Snack bar facilities are also provided on board. Originally delivered as three-car sets, some sets were extended in length with S and Z type carriages.

Today the carriages are hauled by N class diesel locomotives. The carriages can use an external head end power supply for lighting and air conditioning operation. Each carriage has two swing doors per side, which were originally manually opened by passengers, but have since been converted to powered operation, and they are locked or unlocked by the conductor. Toilets, drinking fountains and luggage areas are provided throughout each carriage set.

== History ==
In 1977, an order was placed for 30 N type carriages (10 sets) for use on the Geelong line, with six cars added to the order in 1978 for the Ballarat line, due to a by-election in that city. As part of the state government's "New Deal for Country Passengers" in 1981, the order was increased to 54 carriages, and then to 57 due to cost savings during construction. The cars were built between 1981 and 1984, based upon the structural design of the Victorian Z type carriages built between 1956 and 1960.

In 2007, V/Line commenced a refurbishment program for its H type carriages and Sprinter railcars, the program later being extended to the N type carriages. In October 2007, the first refurbished N type carriage was released into traffic with the new V/Line grey exterior livery, as well as updated interior curtains and seat fabrics.

As part of the Albury line gauge conversion, some N carriages were converted to standard gauge. Three sets were formed, each consisting of five carriages and a power/luggage van, classed as SN1, SN15 and SN16.

== Services ==
N sets were used on all V/Line routes, but today only operate on the Bendigo line, to Swan Hill.

== Design ==
The design of the N-type carriages was based on the earlier Z-type ones, but with the benefit of thirty years of construction and design experience.

The first-class carriages were fitted with blue-wool seating and blue/grey carpets. The second-class carriages were furnished with orange seats and a russet (tan/brown) carpet. All materials were fire-retardant, and non-skid Pirelli flooring was fitted at the entrances and service areas; in blue to match the carpets in the first class areas, and in maroon for the second class areas. Following customer feedback, the seating arrangements in the economy cars were reorganised to place the centres of back-to-back seats in line with pillars between windows.

Two-stage air-conditioning was fitted for summer, and heating elements placed underneath the carpet for winter. Those systems, along with those for lighting and announcements, were powered by three-phase alternators, fixed to the underframe of each carriage. These required refuelling, but were cheaper and more reliable than the axle-driven generators used in most earlier vehicles.

One unisex toilet was provided at the west end of each carriage, along with hot water for each wash basin, fed from a 635-litre pressurised tank. The system met the Environmental Protection Agency's requirements as they existed in 1981.

Inter-carriage access diaphragms are constructed with rubber tubing, in place of the earlier method using canvas attached to steel frames. The doors for inter-carriage links were 3 ft (914mm) wide.

=== Bogies ===
The bogies for the new cars were a new design, specifically prepared by Vickers Ruwolt. The suspension was based on coil springs, with a secondary cast bolster with spring plank, supported on swing links and coil springs. Each bogie weighed 7000 kg, with a wheelbase of 2,445mm and a maximum axle load of 14 tonnes, and were designed for operation at up to 130 km/h. Tread brakes were fitted, operated by Westinghouse model 250WF brake cylinders. The axle boxes utilised spherical roller bearings, and all parts of the bogie, except the wheels and axles themselves, were designed for conversion to standard gauge. This latter function was finally used in 2009 when the Seymour to Albury line was converted to standard gauge.

=== Power supplies ===
The diesel alternator sets for the carriages provided 3-phase 415-volt alternating current power. Only 1 phase was required for operation, so the other two phases were available for backup or for load-sharing across other carriages - useful because the ACN and BN cars required 28 kW to operate and the BRN, with its additional functions, 40 kW. To accommodate the extra load, the ACN and BN were upgraded midway through construction to a 35kVA supply, and the programming reworked so that the BRN would not power adjacent cars. If all alternators were off, then the cars was able to take power from an external 240vAC power supply. Around the same time as these modifications were made, the alternator set supports were modified to reduce vibration, and the radiator fan motors' thermal overload switches were moved to reduce unnecessary tripping. At the end of the modifications, the system was organised so that in event of a power failure, the batteries mounted under the carriages would automatically reroute all power to the lights at the ends of the train to protect from oncoming traffic. Those lights could function for over ten hours, at the expense of air-conditioning and other functions. The first six cars had plastic fuel pipes near the alternator units, but that was changed from car 7 onwards.

== Construction ==
The N type carriages were the first cars to be built at Newport Workshops in over 20 years. Each carriage took over 20 weeks to construct, with a rolling production line to give one new carriage off the assembly line every fortnight. Weeks 1 to 7 involved the general structure - welding the shell and the underframe together and attaching the ends. Following that, the electrical fitout took four weeks, and the bogies were fitted after Week 11. A mineral fibre insulation was sprayed on internal surfaces between weeks 12–14, and then the final six weeks the internal fibreglass ceiling and wall sheets were fitted, along with carpet, seats, lighting, doors and other components, with a one-week trial at the end. The cost was roughly $500,000 per carriage. The total build time added to 16,500 man-hours per carriage, against 32,000 for the earlier Z type carriages. Additionally, the carriages are between five and eight tonnes heavier than comparable designs overseas, partially due to their being a compromise between regional and commuter type vehicles. On the other hand, they cost a mere $13,000 per seat, against $47,000 per seat for the XPT carriages being built for New South Wales Railways around the same time.

The shells of the carriages were constructed with Lyten Steel, selected for its high strength and anti-corrosion properties. The paint used externally is identical to aircraft mixes, both in domestic and overseas application. It has been suggested that the orange scheme for VicRail was selected due to spare lots of paint available cheaply when Ansett Australia changed from its orange scheme, but this has not been proven.

The initial plan called for three-carriage sets of ACN-BN-BN, where the latter two cars in each set would be identical with second-class seating. By the time the New Deal was properly fleshed out other new carriages were deemed impractical, so after sets 1 through 6 had entered service, set 7 had the experimental BRN20 included in its consist with a modular buffet section. During the tests sets 8 and 9 entered service in the original configuration, then set 10 as ACN-BRN-BN, and sets 11 through 18 were constructed with two buffet cars; as they were released to service the most-recent of the ACN-BN-BN sets was recalled to Newport Workshops for a carriage swap, so that eventually all sets were of the ACN-BRN-BN configuration. (Set 19, added at the end of the project, was released as ACN-BRN-BN, just like set N10.)

Most carriages were fitted with automatic couplers with an implicit agreement that sets would not be separated; one of the sets in the mid-1980s had drawbars fitted between its three carriages experimentally. The automatic couplers were expected to be temporary, with scharfenberg couplers expected in June 1983 to replace them and the hard-wired electrical and pneumatic links between carriages. However, a derailment in late 2011 revealed that set SN1 on the standard gauge still had autocouplers between the carriages.

A snapshot of the production line timeline is available in Newsrail, September 1982, p. 197. It lists sets N1 through N9 complete, with the carriages forming N10 through N14 at various stages of construction and fit-out, and the frames of the 43rd carriage being welded together as of 28 July 1982.

=== Shell 19 ===
Carriage shell number 19 was delayed in construction as it was selected for the trial buffet module equipment. As a result, car 20 became BN19, and car 19 entered service as BRN20. The car was also used to test alternative carriage side materials, such as corrugated stainless steel sheeting; this was eventually rejected and normal carriage side material was fitted in its place. A sketch of the proposal is provided in Newsrail, June 1982, p. 113.

The buffet modules, developed by Smallwood & Leibert, were intended to fit through the carriage doorways and then be assembled in situ. The new carriage design was tested on daily return trips from Melbourne to Bendigo, with additional runs to Albury and Gippsland before it officially entered service. In practice the module was too heavy for the carriage design and had to be modified, as the offset weight gave the body a lean of "almost three inches" - this was rectified by temporarily modifying the bogie spring layout. BRN29, the next of the type to enter service, was reorganised with the buffet on the north side of the car (following east and west end convention), and at the end of the project BRN20 was modified to match the standard of the rest of the fleet.

=== Scharfenberg couplers ===
As an experiment, BRN33 was fitted with scharfenberg coupler drawbars in lieu of normal automatic couplers during construction.

== Details ==
N type carriages are individually numbered in the 1 to 57 series. Sets were issued to traffic with three types of carriage:

- ACN first class (2+2 seating, recline and rotate) with conductors van, 52 seats
- BRN economy class (2+3 seating, fixed) with snack bar, 67 seats
- BN economy class (2+3 seating, fixed), 88 seats

The BRN cars were a late addition to the concept, and the majority had their final two windows on the buffet side merely painted over. BRN cars 20, 47 and 52 are the only ones known to have been built without those two windows.

From 1995 surplus Z type carriages were upgraded to N type interiors, with the following codes but with their original Z type numbers:

- BZN economy class (2+3 seating, fixed) with disabled access and toilet, 72 seats
- BTN economy class (2+3 seating, fixed), 88 seats

In 2009 a new code was introduced in conjunction with the formation of 'pure' 5-car N sets for standard gauge use:

- BDN economy class (2+3 seating, fixed) with disabled access and toilet (interior similar to a BZN carriage), 72 seats.

== In service ==
=== VicRail & V/Line Orange Era (1981-1995) ===
The first N sets introduced, N1 and N2, entered service on the Melbourne-bound train from South Geelong, at 6:50am on Monday October 5, 1981. The train split at Spencer Street station, with set N1 running to then from Horsham before forming an evening Geelong run, and set N2 running to Ballarat and return, then to South Geelong in the evening and shunting back to Geelong yard. On Saturday 10th one set ran to Spencer Street then formed a return Horsham (same as weekdays, excluding South Geelong), while the other set ran four return Geelong trips. On Sunday 11th both sets were coupled, for a Geelong to Spencer St run, then a return Bendigo and Swan Hill run, then back to Geelong. Set N3 entered service on one of the five Warrnambool/Ballarat/Shepparton rosters, replacing a set of cars CE-AS-BEa/c-BW; those cars were split, with the AS to a Gippsland set and the BEac to a Numurkah set. Set N4 then became the first "spare" N roster, available for service from 19 May 1982 if one of the other three was unable to run for any reason. The fifth set entered service on 19 June, running Tuesdays to Friday on the 7am from Ballarat to Spencer Street with the return departure at 5:58pm. The set also ran a Horsham 9:30am outbound, 4:15pm inbound on Saturdays, and joined the existing Horsham train for extra capacity on Sundays.

The plan as at early 1982 was for all 54 carriages (not yet 57) to be in service by the end of 1983, running services to Warrnambool, Horsham, Shepparton, Geelong and some Bendigo services. All other services were to be provided by the existing S, Z and airconditioned E carriages, plus interurban Comeng type trains running to Traralgon. All carriages were to be formed into semi-fixed 3 or 4-car sets, with schedules built around standard consists to keep runs fast and simple. Additionally, all sets were to include only one conductor/guard van, rather than one each end, to maximise capacity for length and weight of each train set. The roster at the time worked with fourteen interurban trains (plus four on the electrified eastern region), so that would allow enough N sets spare and in rostered maintenance.

As of June 1982, the roster included four N sets in service, N3 through N6, with one spare and one undergoing modifications. At the time, set N7 was due to be introduced on the Gippslander run to Bairnsdale on the week beginning 31 May; N8 and N9 had already entered service, and were stabled at Ballarat and Bendigo respectively, and had replaced CE-AS-BEac-BWL sets. The AS cars went to Ballarat Workshops for rebuilding, and the airconditioned BE cars replaced non-airconditioned cars in other sets. Further rebalancing of stock allowed the N sets to run on Dimboola trains, as accelerated schedules made return trips practical. The fleet roster at the time was expected to last at least until the end of October, at which point half of the N cars would have been delivered.

An excerpt of the roster "N9" (i.e. the 9th roster post New Deal) as printed in the September 1982 Newsrail is provided below (amended November 1982 p. 283), showing the N car runs. Aside from these seven entries, a further 30 runs were scheduled, most including at least one airconditioned carriage. "SSS" is shorthand for Spencer Street station, meaning the platforms and not indicating the shunt in or out of yards.

Run	Monday to Friday			Saturday			Sunday		
Run	Dep. SSS	To/From	Arr. SSS	Dep. SSS	To/From	Arr. SSS	Dep. SSS	To/From	Arr. SSS
01		South Geelong	0800	0800	Geelong	1040	0935	Swan Hill	2120
01	0835	Horsham	1845	1100	Geelong	1337	2245	Geelong (empty)	
01	1910	Geelong	2213	1400	Geelong	1640			
01	2325	Geelong		1700	Geelong	1937			
01	form #11			form #01			form #11		
02		South Geelong	0800	0835	Horsham	1855	0935	Swan Hill	2120
02	0932	Ballarat	1350				2245	Geelong (empty)	
02	1647	South Geelong							
02		Geelong (Friday only, empty)	2135						
02	form #01			form #02			form #13		
10		Geelong	0824		Geelong	0840	0930	Horsham	2045
10	0905	Shepparton	1457	0915	Shepparton	1855	2110	Geelong	
10	1525	South Geelong	1808						
10	1830	Bendigo							
10	forms #14			forms #10			forms #02		
11		Geelong	0824		Geelong	0840		Warrnambool	2020
11	0925	Warrnambool	1708	0925	Warrnambool	1650	2245	Geelong (empty)	
11	1740	Geelong	2043	1825	Warrnambool				
11	2110	Geelong							
11	form #10			form #11			form #10		
12		Ballarat	0840	Stable Albury			0930	Horsham	2045
12	1000	Bendigo	1605				2110	Geelong	
12	1647	South Geelong							
12		South Geelong (Friday only, empty)	2135						
12	Form #02			Form #13			Form #01		
13		South Geelong (Monday only)	0900		Ballarat	0945		Albury	1848
13		Ballarat (Monday excluded)	0940	1800	Ballarat		1915	Bendigo	
13	1520	Ballarat	1953						
13	2030	Ballarat (Friday excluded)							
13	2040	Albury (Friday only)							
13	Form #12			Form #14			Form #14		
14		Bendigo	0910		Bendigo	0925		Ballarat	1048
14	1445	South Geelong	1740	1300	Ballarat	1745	1315	Ballarat	1755
14	1758	Ballarat					1830	Ballarat	
14	Form #13			Form #12			Form #12		

Roster N10 started 31 October 1982 with ten N sets in service, two with BRN buffet cars and eight all-sitting sets; of the latter, two were rostered as spares and six were in service. The buffet sets (N7 and N10) were rostered on the Warrnambool (1255 ex Spencer Street, returning 1600 in lieu of 1700 as above) and Horsham day return schedules, plus the 0835 and 1825 Saturday Warrnambool runs.

The additional ACN-BN-BN set ran the 0615 (formerly 0620) from South Geelong, going on to form the 0755 to Horsham; after returning to Melbourne it replaced the former 1315 railcar and trailer to Shepparton, as the new 1255 departure running parallel to the outbound Warrnambool. On Saturdays it ran the 0700 city to South Geelong, and on Sunday it ran to Numurkah. The 1740 to Geelong was downgraded to a non-airconditioned timber set, but the 1645 to South Geelong was increased to the 1605 from Bendigo (as above), plus the 1600 N set arrival from Warrnambool. While previously the 0824 double N set formed the Warrnambool and Shepparton services, these were retimed to 0835 and 0855 respectively and formed by the 0800 (retimed to 0758) arrival. Instead, the 0824 double set arrival from Geelong was shunted to Spencer Street yard until the afternoon, leaving other sets to take the Ballarat and Horsham services.

Around the same time, the proposals for Comeng interurban trains for the Traralgon line were dropped, as they would not have been available until 1986; and so concepts for further carriages following the delivery of the 54 N cars were being prepared. In practice the further order never developed.

The first use of N cars to Mildura was an unplanned event on the evening of 4 May 1983, when due to an industrial dispute the ordinary carriages were not available for The Vinelander. As such, the consist of VLPY139-1BN-2BN-3ACN was used to Mildura, the same set making the return trip starting from Mildura that evening.

By late 1983, roster N18 had fifteen of the eighteen N sets in service and the remaining three under rostered maintenance. This included regularly running on the Gippsland line in lieu of the proposed interurban services. Under that roster, N sets ran return trips:

- 1 per week to Albury (Friday night outbound, Sunday morning return)
- 34 per week to Ballarat
- 9 per week to Bendigo
- 7 per week to Cobram
- 6 per week to Dimboola (Sunday excluded)
- 38 per week to Geelong (including one double set, Sunday to Thursday)
- 7 per week to Horsham (including one double set on Sunday)
- 10 per week to Kyneton
- 6 per week to Shepparton (Sunday excluded)
- 17 per week to South Geelong (including one double set, Monday to Friday)
- 1 per week to Swan Hill (double set, Sunday only)
- 26 per week to Traralgon (including one double set on Sunday)
- 17 per week to Warrnambool (including one double set on Saturday)

=== V/Line Passenger Red Era (1995-2007) ===
All N type carriages were transferred across to V/Line Passenger when the country rail operator was split between freight and passenger divisions in 1995. In 1995, Z cars began to be converted to BZN carriages. Progressively, Z sets began to be eliminated as a result of the introduction of the Sprinter railcars. Subsequently, spare BZ and BZS cars were converted to BZN cars. The interior of these cars were roughly based on the N type car layout, but in an old Z car. The code BZN indicates that it is an economy car, with Z indicating its former use as a Z car, and N indicating it being classified as an N car.

The first four-carriage N set, FN15 with carriage BZS273, was formed in October 1994. The set entered service painted red and retained its onboard generators but was expected to use head-end power provided by locomotives except in emergency. Its first rostered use was on South Geelong services Monday to Thursday, then the Friday afternoon Swan Hill passenger service returning Saturday morning, and the Saturday night then Sunday morning Albury trip. Parallel with FN sets entering service, the D vans saw reduced use with none used at all on Friday 28 July 1995; by this time they were generally only used on weekends, during school holidays, or if required for specific group travel bookings. Some of the weekend traffic included transport of fresh fruit from Shepparton, for sale at Footscray market the following Monday.

By 1998, 8 cars had been converted to BZN cars. Ultimately, 14 cars were converted to BZN cars. Three more Z cars were converted to the new BTN format in 2003. These were all former BCZ class economy cars. The first cars converted were 251, 253 and 254, which were later followed by several more. 7 cars were ultimiately converted to BTN cars. The interior arrangement of these cars had 88 seats, the same capacity as the BN class economy sitting cars.

In 2007, the Kerang rail accident occurred around 6 km (3.7 mi) north-west of Kerang. An N set, N7, was involved in this accident, which killed 11 people. The 3 cars in this set were ACN21, BRN20 and BN19. Carriage BRN20 was damaged beyond repair and was later scrapped. Carriage ACN21 was initially paired with a number of BS cars to make up a new carriage set, however, it was ultimately rebuilt as BDN21 for standard gauge. Carriage BN19 was converted to standard gauge and placed in set SN1.

Carriage set FN2 was retired at an unknown time and its carriages were split elsewhere.

=== V/Line Passenger Grey Era (2007-2017) ===
2007 saw car BZN252 and BZN267 painted in a new mk3 livery. These cars were both newly converted from west coast Z cars to BZN cars - BZN252 from former first class car ACZ252, and BZN267 from former economy car BZ267. This was followed by carriage set VN12 as the first repainted, containing carriages ACN36, BRN35, BN23, and BZN273. Despite being coded a VN set, where the V indicates 5 carriages, there were only 4 cars for the initial runs of this set. Carriage set FN14 was the second repainted, and by 2016 the last car in mk2 (actually a Z car, BCZ257) was repainted into mk3. This meant all N-type carriages were painted in the grey livery. Despite the introduction of a new livery in 2017, various BTN and BZN cars remain in the mk3 livery attached to otherwise repainted mk4 sets.

=== V/Line Passenger Purple Era, Withdrawal and Preservation (2017-) ===
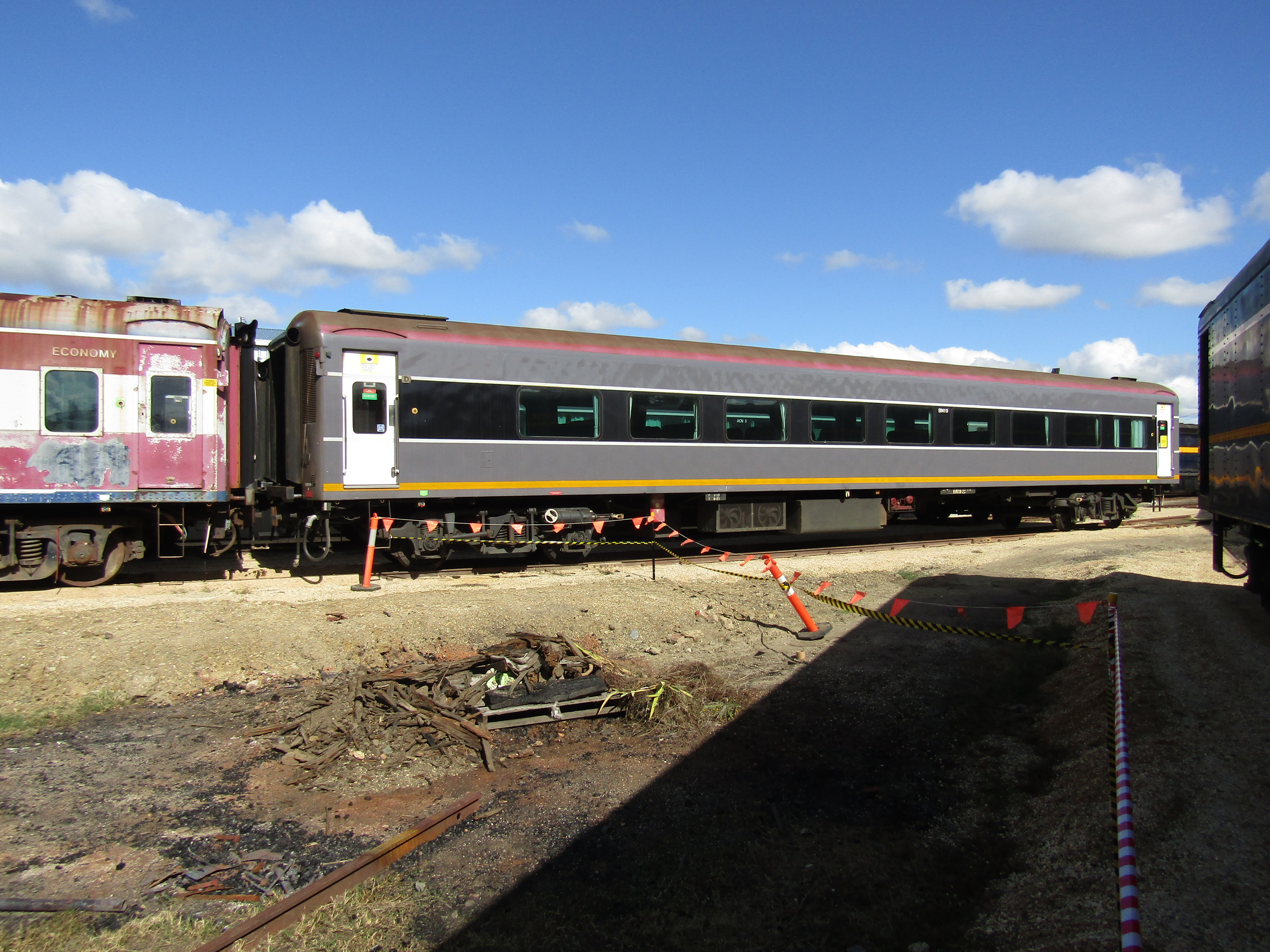
BN 19 at the Seymour Railway Heritage Centre, stripped of its PTV livery, 2023

In 2017, V/Line released a fourth carriage set for use on the Albury Line in 2017 with a new PTV livery. This was set SN8 (alongside locomotive N457), first running in April 2017. Followed by set VN3 a week later, the livery was subsequently applied to all N type (ACN/BN/BRN/BDN) carriages and some of the BZN/BTN fleet, though not all the ex-Z cars have received the livery.

The new Bairnsdale line timetable from 28 August 2018 brought an end to locomotive-hauled trains on 2 out of 3 daily services. Prior to this, all services except one return service to Sale on a Sunday were operated by N sets.

The introduction of the standard gauge VLocity units in December 2021 marked the beginning of N set withdrawals, with set SN8 being transferred to the Seymour Railway Heritage Centre for indefinite storage on 15 January 2022. Initially running on only the 12:05pm Albury and 5:20pm Southern Cross services, the timetable introduced on 28 August 2022 saw the removal of N sets from the Albury line.

Following the withdrawal of N sets on the Albury line, four sets of N cars were no longer required, and were stored or distributed to heritage organisations:

- 707 Operations now own ACN45, BRN43, BN5 from set SN15, as well as BN22 and ACN48 from set SN16, to be used for their journeys on standard gauge.
- Seymour Railway Heritage Centre now own ACN3, BRN53 and BN19 from SN1 and BRN46 from SN16, and are to be used for their standard gauge journeys.
- Steamrail Victoria own ACN24, BRN34 and BN10 from SN8, as well as car BN7, joining their fleet of K Type Carriages on Standard Gauge.
- Carriages BDN2, BDN6, BDN21 and BDN50 have been converted back onto Broad Gauge and used on the remaining FN/VN sets.

On 5 October 2022, it was announced that from 23 October, all Shepparton services would now operate using VLocity units, this has been delayed until further notice due to flooding at Shepparton. This would result in the end of N set operations on services along the Seymour corridor.

By September 2024, no Bairnsdale services were run by locomotive-hauled trains.

In November 2024, Vlocity trains began to replace N sets on the Warrnambool line, with all services replaced with Vlocity trains by 1 December 2024, except for those stabled at Warrnambool overnight. From 14 April 2025, all Warrnambool line services began being operated by Vlocity units. The final locomotive-hauled service ran on 30 March 2025.

By 18 March 2025, five ACN, one each BCZ and BDN, six BN, five BRN, three BTN and five BZN were removed from the V/Line rolling stock register, along with all remaining H type carriages, five D, one DN van and power van PH454.

On the night of 29 May 2025, vehicles ACN27, ACN39, ACN57, BDN6, BDN21, BDN50, BN16, BN17, BN55, BRN37, BRN38, BRN56, BZN261 and BZN271 were authorised for transferred from Newport Workshops to North Bendigo Workshops in a transfer by Southern Shorthaul Railroad, having been withdrawn from V/Line service.

As the N Sets now only operate a twice daily service to Swan Hill, only 4 N Sets are still in operation with V/Line. These are sets VN10 (BN28-BRN29-ACN30), VN12 (BN23-BRN35-ACN36), VN14 (BN14-BRN41-ACN42) and VN17 (BN4-BRN31-ACN51)

== Carriage sets ==
The N cars appeared in fixed sets which were not altered in ordinary service. The sets were numbered between 1 and 19. Initially issued to service as 3-car sets, from 1995 additional cars of the BCZ, ACZ, BS, BZN or BTN type were attached to give longer sets. Additional cars might be temporarily attached to a set, or detached from it, without the set code being altered.

- N: 3-car set ACN-BRN-BN (not commonly seen in regular service)
- FN: 4-car set ACN-BRN-(mix of 2x N/Z cars); while Z cars out of service, 1x temporary 4N set ACN-BRN-BN-BN.
- VN: 5-car set ACN-BRN-(mix of 3x N/Z cars); while Z cars out of service, 2x temporary 5N set ACN-BRN-ACN-BRN-BN.
- SN: 4-car set ACN-BRN-BDN-BN or 5-car set ACN-BRN-BDN-BN-BN on standard gauge.

The original plan was for 10, then 18 three car sets each of BN-BN-ACN; but when the cars needed on-board food supplies, set N07 had car BRN20 fitted with a buffet module in place of about 20 seats at the east end. Sets N08 and N09 were released as normal BN-BN-ACN sets while N07 was trialled, and when it was deemed a success and followed by N10 as BN-BRN-ACN, sets N11 through N18 were built as BRN-BRN-ACN. Then, as each set was made ready for service, the newest BN-BN-ACN set was recalled to the workshops for mixing cars, so that all sets ended up as BN-BRN-ACN. Set N19, built at the end of the program, was released as BN-BRN-ACN from the start, and at the end of the program BRN20 returned to the workshops for modifications to match the rest of the fleet.

=== Set history ===
Note: Colours are representative only, and do not directly correlate to liveries worn in the era. Also, the zero prefix in sets 1-9 below are incorrect but useful for sorting and searching purposes.

Code	Set No.	From	To	Car F	Car E	Car D	Car C	Car B	Car A (East end)	Capacity	Weight	Length	Changes to achieve	Notes
N	01	16 Sep 1981	20 Sep 1983	n/a	n/a	n/a	BN01	BN02	ACN03	228	129t	69m	As built	
N	01	20 Sep 1983		n/a	n/a	n/a	BN02	BRN53	ACN03	207	130t	69m	Swap between sets N01 & N18 - gain BRN53, lose BN01	
FN	01			n/a	n/a	B??2??	BN02	BRN53	ACN03		180t	91m		Power-operated doors fitted 2006-12-16. Operating as FN by 2001-02-17.
SN	01		03 Sep 2016	n/a	BN19	BN02	BDN50	BRN53	ACN03	366+1W	215t	114m	Add BN19 ex N07, add BDN50 ex N05	Standard gauge from 2011-mm-dd
SN	01	21 Sep 2016	30 Jul 2020	n/a	n/a	BN19	BDN50	BRN53	ACN03	283+1W	172t	91m	Lose BN02 to future set SN08	Retired. ACN03, BRN53 + BN19 to SRHC, BDN50 on VN13
N	02	02 Oct 1981	03 Aug 1983	n/a	n/a	n/a	BN04	BN05	ACN06	228	129t	69m	As Built	
N	02	03 Aug 1983	After 10 Oct 1987	n/a	n/a	n/a	BN05	BRN50	ACN06	207	130t	69m	Swap between sets N02 & N17 - gain BRN50, lose BN04	
N	02	After 10 Oct 1987	26 Sep 1997	n/a	n/a	n/a	BN05	BRN50	ACN06	207	130t	69m	Repainted V/ Line orange with green and white stripes.	
N	02	26 Sep 1997	c. 2005	n/a	n/a	n/a	BN05	BRN50	ACN06	207	130t	69m	Repainted	Operating as N set until 2005.
FN	02	c. 2005	By 11 Dec 2009	n/a	n/a	B??2??	BN05	BRN50	ACN06		180t	91m		Power-operated doors fitted 2007-02-01. BN05 to SN15, BRN50 converted to BDN50 to SN1 and ACN6 converted to BDN6 to SN16
N	03	18 Dec 1981	22 Jun 1983	n/a	n/a	n/a	BN07	BN08	ACN09	228	129t	69m	As Built	
N	03	22 Jun 1983	By 07 Dec 1985	n/a	n/a	n/a	BN08	BRN47	ACN09	207	130t	69m	Swap between sets N03 & N16 - gain BRN47, lose BN07	
N	03	07 Dec 1985	16 Oct 2007	n/a	n/a	n/a	BN08	BRN47	ACN09	207	130t	69m	Repainted V/ Line orange with green and white stripes.	First set repainted. May have been operating as 3-car set as late as 2005.
FN	03	17 Oct 2007	04 Nov 2008	n/a	n/a	BTN254	BN08	BRN47	ACN09	295	180t	91m	Gain BTN254 ex VN18	
FN	03	05 Nov 2008		n/a	n/a	BZN262	BN08	BRN47	ACN09	283+1W	180t	91m	BTN254 removed, BZN262 attached but possibly not formal part of consist.	
"FN"	03		16 Oct 2016	n/a	n/a	n/a	BN08	BRN47	ACN09	207	130t	69m	Z cars withdrawn account bogie cracking issues.	
FN	03	17 Oct 2016	24 Oct 2016	n/a	n/a	BZN261	BN08	BRN47	ACN09	283+1W	180t	91m	BZN261 returned to service.	
FN	03	24 Oct 2016	24 Apr 2017	n/a	n/a	BZN256	BN08	BRN47	ACN09	283+1W	180t	91m	BZN256 returned to service; replaced BZN261.	
VN	03	24 Apr 2017	2023	n/a	BTN264	BZN256	BN08	BRN47	ACN09	371+1W	230t	114m	Gain BTN264 ex FN14.	
VN	03	2023		n/a	BDN6	BZN256	BN08	BRN47	ACN09	371+1W	230t	114m	Lose BTN264, gain BDN6 ex SN16.	
N	04	19 Feb 1982	19 Apr 1983	n/a	n/a	n/a	BN10	BN11	ACN12	228	129t	69m	As Built	
N	04	19 Apr 1983	By 07 Sep 1986	n/a	n/a	n/a	BN11	BRN44	ACN12	207	130t	69m	Swap between sets N04 & N15 - gain BRN44, lose BN10	
N	04	By 07 Sep 1986	By 08 Mar 1987	n/a	n/a	n/a	BN11	BRN44	ACN12	207	130t	69m	Repainted V/ Line orange with green and white stripes.	
N	04	By 09 Mar 1987	Post 16 Apr 1987	n/a	n/a	n/a	BN19	BRN44	ACN12	207	130t	69m	Swap between sets N04 & N07 - gain BN19, lose BN11.	ACN12 and BRN44 in V/ Line livery with white and green stripes; BN11 in V/ Line livery with silver stripes.
N	04	By 13 Jun 1987	By 16 Jun 2003	n/a	n/a	n/a	BN11	BRN44	ACN12	207	130t	69m	Swap between sets N04 & N07 - gain BN11, lose BN19.	Restored.
FN	04	By 16 Jun 2003		n/a	n/a	B??2??	BN11	BRN44	ACN12		180t	92m	Gain Z car.	
N	04		12 Jan 2009	n/a	n/a	n/a	BN11	BRN44 CP / VVCP - Steel Guards Van	ACN12	207	130t	69m	Repainted. Z car removed.	
VN	04	12 Jan 2009		n/a	BTN2??	BZN267	BN11	BRN44	ACN12	371+1W	230t	114m	Refurbished, repainted, BTN2?? and BZN267 added.	
"VN"	04		01 Oct 2016	n/a	n/a	n/a	BN11	BRN44	ACN12	206	130t	69m	BTN and BZN removed account bogie issues.	
FN	04	01 Oct 2016	01 Nov 2016	n/a	n/a	BZN267	BN11	BRN44	ACN12	274+1W	180t	91m	BZN restored.	
FN	04	01 Nov 2016	23 Dec 2016	n/a	n/a	n/a	BN11	BRN44	ACN12	207	130t	69m	BZN267 to set FN14. Set to Newport Workshops for exams.	
FN	04	23 Dec 2016	Current	n/a	n/a	BZN267	BN11	BRN44	ACN12	274+1W	180t	91m	Return BZN267 ex set FN14.	
N	05	12 Mar 1982	18 Mar 1983	n/a	n/a	n/a	BN13	BN14	ACN15	228	129t	69m	As Built	
N	05	18 Mar 1983	By 01 Aug 1987	n/a	n/a	n/a	BN13	BRN40	ACN15	207	130t	69m	Swap between sets N05 & N14 - gain BRN40, lose BN14	
N	05	By 01 Aug 1987	By 30 Jun 1997	n/a	n/a	n/a	BN13	BRN40	ACN15	207	130t	69m	Repainted V/ Line orange with green and white stripes.	
N	05	By 30 Jun 1997	Post 20 Mar 2005	n/a	n/a	n/a	BN13	BRN40	ACN15	207	130t	69m	Painted red	
FN	05	Post 20 Mar 2005		n/a	n/a	n/a	BN13	BRN40	ACN15	207	130t	69m	Fitted with composite brake blocks late 2005.	
FN	05		By 02 Nov 2010	n/a	n/a	BZN262	BN13	BRN40	ACN15	283+1W	180t	91m	Gain Z car.	
FN	05	By 02 Nov 2010		n/a	n/a	BZN262	BN13	BRN40	ACN15	283+1W	180t	91m		
FN	05	By 02 Nov 2010	Current	n/a	n/a	BZN266	BN13	BRN40	ACN15	283+1W	180t	91m		
VN	05	Soon		n/a	BZN273	BZN266	BN13	BRN40	ACN15	359+2W	230t	114m	BZN273 ex set FN10	
N	06	02 Apr 1982	25 Feb 1983	n/a	n/a	n/a	BN16	BN17	ACN18	228	129t	69m	As Built	
N	06	25 Feb 1983	By 07 Sep 1986	n/a	n/a	n/a	BN17	BRN38	ACN18	207	130t	69m	Swap between sets N06 & N13 - gain BRN38, lose BN16	
N	06	By 07 Sep 1986	By 23 Mar 2003	n/a	n/a	n/a	BN17	BRN38	ACN18	207	130t	69m	Repainted V/ Line orange with green and white stripes.	BRN38 under maintenance as at 10 October 1988, removed from set and BRS230 attached at west end.
FN	06	By 23 Mar 2003	By 23 Sep 2007	n/a	n/a	B??2??	BN17	BRN38	ACN18		180t	91m	Circa 2007, often ran with BCZ259	
"FN"	06	By 14 Feb 2013		n/a	BN14	BRN41	ACN42	BRN38	ACN18	326	217t	114m	BN17 to set FN09. Z cars withdrawn account bogie cracking issues. Absorbed set N14. Was officially referred to as a 5N set, to distinguish from sets with Z carriages.	
FN	06			n/a	n/a	BN14	BRN41	BRN38	ACN18	274	174t	91m	ACN42 withdrawn account damaged spring	
"FN"	06		25 Sep 2016	n/a	n/a	n/a	BN17	BRN38	ACN18	207	130t	69m	BRN41-BN14 to Set N08. Recover BN17 ex set FN09.	
FN	06	25 Sep 2016		n/a	n/a	BZN274	BN17	BRN38	ACN18	279+1W	180t	91m	Gain BZN274.	
FN	06	25 Sep 2016		n/a	BTN259	BZN274	BN17	BRN38	ACN18	367+1W	230t	114m	Gain BTN259 ex VN12.	
N	07	14 May 1982	By 12 Mar 1987	n/a	n/a	n/a	BN19	BRN20	ACN21	207	130t	69m	As Built	First set with buffet. BRN20 originally had buffet module on reverse side, later swapped. Set overhauled and re-entered service 6 December 1985, assumed last in plain orange livery.
N	07	By 12 Mar 1987	Post 16 Apr 1987	n/a	n/a	n/a	BRS224	BN11	ACN21	189	130t	69m	Lose BRN20 (reason unknown). Lose BN19 to set N4. Gain BN11 ex N4, BRS224 ex Z set spares. Second use of non-N type carriage in N set, following use of BRS227 as third car of unknown N set in December 1986. Reportedly necessary to place BRS224 as third carriage due to coupling incompatibility.	
N	07	By 16 Apr 1987	Post 16 Apr 1987	n/a	n/a	n/a	BN11	BRN20	ACN21	189	130t	69m	Regain BRN20 in lieu of BRS224.	
N	07	Post 16 Apr 1987	02 Oct 1987	n/a	n/a	n/a	BN19	BRN20	ACN21	207	130t	69m	Regain BRN20 and BN19.	Restored
N	07	02 Oct 1987	26 Sep 1997	n/a	n/a	n/a	BN19	BRN20	ACN21	207	130t	69m	Repainted V/ Line orange with green and white stripes.	
N	07		05 Jun 2007	n/a	n/a	n/a	BN19	BRN20	ACN21	207	130t	69m	Repainted.	Set dissolved following Kerang train accident 5 June 2007. BRN20 extensively damaged and scrapped, BN19 and ACN21 spare. BN19 reallocated; ACN21 used in new set SN07, recycling old BS carriages. By 2010-01-27, both cars properly redeployed.
SN	07	21 Sep 2007	28 Dec 2008	BS217	BS219	BS216	BS218	BS215	ACN21	372	280t	137m	Created new.	Temporary set to replace lost set N7 following Kerang crash, using S type carriages. Carriages BS215 and BS216 were not fitted with retention toilets, and were sealed off. Shortly after introduction to service BS218 was removed due to faulty air conditioning, but it rejoined the set soon after. Set became SZ7 for the 2009-2010 period, after ACN21 was converted to BDN21 on standard gauge and ACZ257 was converted to BCZ257.
N	08	07 Jun 1982	17 Dec 1982	n/a	n/a	n/a	BN22	BN23	ACN24	228	129t	69m	As Built	
N	08	17 Dec 1982	Post Jun 1997, before Jan 2000	n/a	n/a	n/a	BN22	BRN34	ACN24	207	130t	69m	Swap between sets N08 & N12 - gain BRN34, lose BN23	
N	08	Post Jun 1997, before Jan 2000	Post Feb 2005	n/a	PH453	BN22	BRN34	ACN24	D322	207 + 25 tonnes	206t	85m	Regular roster 12:40pm Spencer Street to Warrnambool, return 5:45pm, run behind S302. PH van for head-end power, and D van for noise.	Repainted
FN	08	Post Feb 2005	By 24 Jan 2010	n/a	n/a	B??2??	BN22	BRN34	ACN24		180t	91m	Z car ex-AZ per windows	
FN	08	By 24 Jan 2010.		n/a	n/a	B??2??	B??2??	BRN34	ACN24		187t	91m	BN22 to set SN16	
"FN"	08	By 14 Feb 2013		n/a	BN55	BRN56	ACN57	BRN34	ACN24	326	217t	114m	Z cars withdrawn due to bogie cracking issues. Absorbed set N19. Was officially referred to as a 5N set, to distinguish from sets with Z carriages.	
FN	08			n/a	n/a	BN14	BRN41	BRN34	ACN24	274	174t	92m	Gain BN14, BRN41 from set N14	
"FN"	08		By 31 Dec 2016	n/a	n/a	n/a	n/a	BRN34	ACN24	119	087t	46m	Under conversion to standard gauge	
SN	08	By 31 Dec 2016	30 Jul 2020	n/a	n/a	BN10	BDN02	BRN34	ACN24	283+1W	172t	91m	Gain BDN02 ex SN01 (was BN02) and BN10 ex SN15. Repainted into livery based on VLocity scheme.	Retired, BDN2 on VN12. remainder of set in South Australia awaiting restoration
N	09	02 Jul 1982	26 Nov 1982	n/a	n/a	n/a	BN25	BN26	ACN27	228	129t	69m	As Built	ACN available for service on 1982-06-30
N	09	26 Nov 1982	By 26 Mar 1986}	n/a	n/a	n/a	BN26	BRN32	ACN27	207	130t	69m	Swap between sets N09 & N11 - gain BRN32, lose BN25	
N	09	26 Mar 1986	By 13 May 2004	n/a	n/a	n/a	BN26	BRN32	ACN27	207	130t	69m	Repainted V/ Line orange with green and white stripes.	
FN	09	By 13 May 2004	By 15 Jan 2013	n/a	n/a	B??2??	BN26	BRN32	ACN27		180t	91m	Power operated doors fitted 2006-11-08. Z car range 264–276.	
"FN"	09	By 15 Jan 2013	By 14 Feb 2013	n/a	n/a	n/a	BN26	BRN32	ACN27	207	130t	69m	Z cars withdrawn due to bogie cracking issues.	
FN	09	By 14 Feb 2013	Post 11 Jun 2013	n/a	n/a	BN17	BN26	BRN32	ACN27	295	173t	91m	BN17 ex set FN06.	
"FN"	09	Post 11 Jun 2013	c. Jan 2016	n/a	n/a	n/a	BN26	BRN32	ACN27	207	129t	69m	BN17 returned to set FN06.	
FN	09	c. Jan 2016		n/a	n/a	BCZ257	BN26	BRN32	ACN27	255+1W	179t	91m	Gain BCZ257; not always, but usually attached.	
FN	09		c. 2022	n/a	n/a	BZN265	BN26	BRN32	ACN27	283+1W	180t	91m	Lose BCZ257 to FN19, gain BZN265.	
VN	09	c. 2022	Current	n/a	BDN50	BZN265	BN26	BRN32	ACN27	283+1W	180t	91m	gain BDN50 ex SN1.	
N	10	29 Oct 1982	By 27 Feb 1986	n/a	n/a	n/a	BN28	BRN29	ACN30	207	130t	69m	As Built	
N	10	27 Feb 1986	By Feb 2007	n/a	n/a	n/a	BN28	BRN29	ACN30	207	130t	69m	Repainted V/ Line orange with green and white stripes.	
FN	10	By Feb 2007		n/a	n/a	BZN276	BN28	BRN29	ACN30	283+1W	180t	91m		
"FN"	10		c. Aug 2016	n/a	n/a	n/a	BN28	BRN29	ACN30	207	130t	69m	Assumed during Z car withdrawals	
FN	10	c. Aug 2016	23 Sep 2016	n/a	n/a	BTN268	BN16	BRN37	ACN39	295	180t	92m	Gain BTN268.	
FN	10	24 Sep 2016		n/a	n/a	BZN252	BN28	BRN29	ACN30	283+1W	180t	91m	Gain BZN252; BTN268 to FN13	
FN	10		Current	n/a	BTN251	BZN273	BN28	BRN29	ACN30	371+1W	230t	114m	Lose BZN252 to set FN13; gain BZN273 ex FN19 and BTN251 ex workshops	
FN	10	Soon		n/a	BTN251	BZN262	BN28	BRN29	ACN30	371+1W	230t	114m	Lose BZN273 to set FN13; gain BZN262 ex workshops	
N	11	29 Nov 1982	29 Nov 1982	n/a	n/a	n/a	BRN31	BRN32	ACN33	186	131t	69m	As Built	Did not enter service.
N	11	29 Nov 1982	By 16 Jun 1986	n/a	n/a	n/a	BN25	BRN31	ACN33	207	130t	69m	Swap between sets N09 & N11 - gain BN25, lose BRN32	
N	11	16 Jun 1986	Post 11 Apr 2005, before 2006-01-16.	n/a	n/a	n/a	BN25	BRN31	ACN33	207	130t	69m	Repainted V/ Line orange with green and white stripes.	
FN	11	Post 11 Apr 2005, before 2006-01-16.		n/a	n/a	B??2??	BN25	BRN31	ACN33		180t	91m		
"FN"	11		01 Nov 2013	n/a	n/a	n/a	BN25	BRN31	ACN33	207	130t	69m	Z cars withdrawn account bogie cracking issues.	
FN	11	01 Nov 2013		n/a	n/a	BZN271	BN25	BRN31	ACN33	271+1W	179t	91m	Add BZN271, except from 2016-09-05 to 2016-09-22.	
FN	11		Current	n/a	n/a	BZN276	BN25	BRN31	ACN33	271+1W	179t	91m	Lose BZN271 to VN19; gain BZN276 ex Workshops	
FN	11	Soon		n/a	BTN268	BZN276	BN25	BRN31	ACN33	371+1W	230t	114m	Gain BTN268 ex Workshops	
N	12	17 Dec 1982	17 Dec 1982	n/a	n/a	n/a	BRN34	BRN35	ACN36	186	131t	69m	As built.	Did not enter service.
N	12	17 Dec 1982	By 01 Aug 1987	n/a	n/a	n/a	BN23	BRN35	ACN36	207	130t	69m	Swap between sets N08 & N12 - gain BN23, lose BRN34	
N	12	By 01 Aug 1987		n/a	n/a	n/a	BN23	BRN35	ACN36	207	130t	69m	Repainted V/ Line orange with green and white stripes.	
VN	12		23 Jan 2008	n/a	B??2??	B??2??	BN23	BRN35	ACN36		230t	114m	Z cars added, both ex-BZ range 264–276.	
VN	12	23 Jan 2008		n/a	B??2??	B??2??	BN23	BRN35	ACN36		230t	114m	Repainted. Both Z cars ex-BZ range 264–276.	
"VN"	12			n/a	n/a	n/a	BN23	BRN35	ACN36	207	130t	69m	Z cars withdrawn account bogie cracking issues.	
VN	12			n/a	BTN259	BZN272	BN23	BRN35	ACN36	371+1W	230t	114m	Gain BZN272 and BTN259.	
VN	12		c. Oct 2022	n/a	n/a	BZN272	BN23	BRN35	ACN36	283+1W	180t	91m	Lose BTN259 to VN06	
VN	12	c. Oct 2022	Current	n/a	BDN02	BZN272	BN23	BRN35	ACN36	283+1W	180t	91m	Gain BD2 ex SN8	
N	13	14 Feb 1983	14 Feb 1983	n/a	n/a	n/a	BRN37	n/a	ACN39	118	77t	46m	As Built.	25 Feb 1983 in set N06.
N	13	14 Feb 1983	By 01 Aug 1987	n/a	n/a	n/a	BN16	BRN37	ACN39	207	130t	69m	Swap between sets N06 & N13 - gain BN16, lose BRN38	
N	13	By 01 Aug 1987	By 19 Mar 2005	n/a	n/a	n/a	BN16	BRN37	ACN39	207	130t	69m	Repainted V/ Line orange with green and white stripes.	
N	13	By 19 Mar 2005	Post 23 Sep 2007	n/a	n/a	n/a	BN16	BRN37	ACN39	207	130t	69m	Repainted	
FN	13	Post 23 Sep 2007		n/a	n/a	B??2??	BN16	BRN37	ACN39		180t	91m	Z car added. Red or grey?	
"FN"	13		23 Sep 2016	n/a	n/a	n/a	BN16	BRN37	ACN39	207	130t	69m	Repainted; Z car removed	
FN	13	23 Sep 2016		n/a	n/a	BTN268	BN16	BRN37	ACN39	295	180t	92m	Gain BTN268.	
FN	13		c. 2023	n/a	n/a	BZN252	BN16	BRN37	ACN39	283+1W	180t	91m	Lose BTN268 to VN11, gain BTN252	
FN	13	c. 2023	Current	n/a	BDN21	BZN252	BN16	BRN37	ACN39	283+1W	180t	91m	Gain BDN21 from SN15	
N	14	25 Mar 1983	25 Mar 1983	n/a	n/a	n/a	BRN40	BRN41	ACN42	186	131t	69m	As Built	Did not enter service.
N	14	25 Mar 1983	By 01 Aug 1987	n/a	n/a	n/a	BN14	BRN41	ACN42	207	130t	69m	Swap between sets N05 & N14 - gain BN14, lose BRN40	
N	14	By 01 Aug 1987	c. Apr 1997	n/a	n/a	n/a	BN14	BRN41	ACN42	207	130t	69m	Repainted V/ Line orange with green and white stripes.	
N	14	c. Apr 1997	07 Aug 2006	n/a	n/a	n/a	BN14	BRN41	ACN42	207	130t	69m	Repainted	
FN	14	07 Aug 2006		n/a	n/a	BZN261	BN14	BRN41	ACN42	275+1W	180t	91m	Add BZN261	
FN	14		13 Jan 2013	n/a	n/a	BZN261	BN14	BRN41	ACN42	275+1W	180t	91m	Repainted. Various stripe patterns applied.	
"FN"	14	13 Jan 2013	c. 25 Sep 2016	n/a	n/a	n/a	BN14	BRN41	ACN42	207	130t	69m	Z cars withdrawn due to bogie cracking problem. May not have operated for long, if at all. Cars quickly absorbed into set "FN"06 as temporary measure. Later, ACN42 pulled from set account spring issue; BRN41-BN14 shifted to set 4N08.	
FN	14	c. 25 Sep 2016	03 Oct 2016	n/a	n/a	n/a	BTN264	BRN41	ACN42	206	137t	91m	Set reassembled, but BN14 not available account level crossing damage. Gain BTN264 in lieu.	
FN	14	03 Oct 2016	01 Nov 2016	n/a	n/a	n/a	n/a	BRN41	ACN42	206	137t	46m	BTN264 removed for "G" exam.	BN14 under maintenance following level crossing damage. BRN41/ACN42 stored during Bendigo line shut October 2016.
FN	14	01 Nov 2016	22 Dec 2016	n/a	n/a	BZN267	BTN263	BRN41	ACN42	274+1W	186t	91m	Gain BTN263 and BZN267.	BN14 under maintenance following level crossing damage.
"FN"	14	23 Dec 2016	c. 2018	n/a	n/a	n/a	BTN263	BRN41	ACN42	274	187t	69m	Lose BZN267 to FN4.	BN14 under maintenance following level crossing damage.
VN	14	c. 2018	Current	n/a	BTN254	BZN258	BN14	BRN41	ACN42	371+1W	230t	114m		May enter service as "VN"14 without Z cars temporarily.
N	15	19 Apr 1983	30 Mar 1983	n/a	n/a	n/a	BRN43	n/a	ACN45	118	77t	46m	As Built	19 Apr 1983 in set N04.
N	15	30 Mar 1983	By 01 Aug 1987	n/a	n/a	n/a	BN10	BRN43	ACN45	207	130t	69m	Swap between sets N04 & N15 - gain BN10, lose BRN44	
N	15	By 01 Aug 1987	Oct 1994	n/a	n/a	n/a	BN10	BRN43	ACN45	207	130t	69m	Repainted V/ Line orange with green and white stripes.	
FN	15	Oct 1994	By 11 Dec 2009	n/a	n/a	BZS273	BN10	BRN43	ACN45	271	180t	92m	Gain BZS273	First FN set.
VN	15	By 11 Dec 2009	By 01 Apr 2011	n/a	BN05	BN10	BDN21	BRN43	ACN45	336+1W	215t	114m	BDN21 ex Set #07 as ACN21; BN05 ex Set #02	
SN	15	By 01 Apr 2011	c. 2017	n/a	BN05	BN10	BDN21	BRN43	ACN45	336+1W	215t	114m	Convert to Standard Gauge	
SN	15	c. 2017	30 Jul 2020	n/a	n/a	BN05	BDN21	BRN43	ACN45	283+1W	172t	91m	BN10 to SN08	Retired, ACN45, BRN43 and BN05 with 707 Ops, BDN21 on VN13
N	16	06 Jun 1983	06 Jun 1983	n/a	n/a	n/a	BRN46	n/a	ACN48	118	77t	46m	As Built	16 Jul 1983 in set N03.
N	16	06 Jun 1983	By 01 Aug 1987	n/a	n/a	n/a	BN07	BRN46	ACN48	207	130t	69m	Swap between sets N03 & N16 - gain BN07, lose BRN47	
N	16	By 01 Aug 1987	Post Jun 1997, before June 2000	n/a	n/a	n/a	BN07	BRN46	ACN48	207	130t	69m	Repainted V/ Line orange with green and white stripes.	
N	16	Post Jun 1997 before June 2000	Post 16 Nov 2007	n/a	n/a	n/a	BN07	BRN46	ACN48	207	130t	69m	Repainted	
SN	16	24 Jan 2010	28 Apr 2011	n/a	BN22	BN07	BDN06	BRN46	ACN48	336+1W	215t	114m	BDN06 ex Set #02 as ACN06; BN22 ex Set #08	
SN	16	28 Apr 2011	c. 2020	n/a	BN22	BN07	BDN06	BRN46	ACN48	336+1W	215t	114m	Convert to Standard Gauge	Lose BN7 - Preserved with Steamrail Victoria, Carriage along with BRN34, BN10 and ACN24 ex SN8 awaiting restoration in South Australia
SN	16	c. 2020	30 Jul 2022	n/a	n/a	BN22	BDN06	BRN46	ACN48	336+1W	215t	114m	Convert to Standard Gauge	Retired, ACN48 with 707 Ops, BRN46 with SRHC, BN22 with 707 Ops and BDN06 on VN3
N	17	21 Jul 1983	21 Jul 1983	n/a	n/a	n/a	BRN49	n/a	ACN51	118	77t	46m	As Built	03 Aug 1983 in set N02.
N	17	21 Jul 1983	06 Oct 1997	n/a	n/a	n/a	BN04	BRN49	ACN51	207	130t	69m	Swap between sets N02 & N17 - gain BN04, lose BRN50	
N	17	Post 06 Oct 1997	By 18 Feb 2001	n/a	n/a	n/a	BN04	BRN49	ACN51	207	130t	69m	Repainted 2023	
VN	17	By 18 Feb 2001	23 Jul 2006	n/a	BS217	BZN258	BN04	BRN49	ACN51	269+1W	227t	92m	Gain 1x S, 1x Z cars. Repainted. Ran with BZ267 in place of BZN258 during 2005.	
VN	17	23 Jul 2006	By 06 Apr 2015	n/a	BTN2??	BZN258	BN04	BRN49	ACN51	371+1W	230t	92m	Swap BS217 for a Z car. Operated without BZN for a time in 2005, possibly longer.	
"VN"	17	By 18 Feb 2015		n/a	n/a	B??2??	BN04	BRN49	ACN51		180t	92m	Repainted. Four-car set.	
VN	17		20 Oct 2016	n/a	BTN253	BZN276	BN04	BRN49	ACN51	371+1W	230t	114m	Add BTN253.	
VN	17	20 Oct 2016	24 Oct 2016	n/a		BTN253	BN04	BRN49	ACN51	295	180t	91m	BZN276 temporarily withdrawn.	
VN	17	24 Oct 2016	Current	n/a	BTN253	BZN261	BN04	BRN49	ACN51	371+1W	230t	114m	BZN261 added ex FN03. Will be moved to FN14 around end of October 2016, same time as BN14 re-enters service on that set.	
VN	17	Soon		n/a	BTN263	BZN261	BN04	BRN49	ACN51	371+1W	230t	114m	Lose BTN253 to VN18; gain BTN263 ex FN14	
N	18	09 Sep 1983	09 Sep 1983	n/a	n/a	n/a	BRN52	n/a	ACN54	118	77t	46m	As Built	20 Sep 1981 in set N01.
N	18	09 Sep 1983		n/a	n/a	n/a	BN01	BRN52	ACN54	207	130t	69m	Swap between sets N01 & N18 - gain BN01, lose BRN53	
VN	18			n/a	BS2??	BS2??	BN01	BRN52	ACN54	305	224t	91m	Repainted. Gain 2x S cars. Ran without BS217 2006-01-03 to 2006-01-31.	
FN	18	By 24 Feb 2008	By 14 May 2012	n/a	n/a	BTN254	BN01	BRN52	ACN54	295	180t	91m	Lose 2x S cars. Gain BTN254.	
VN	18	By 14 May 2012	By 09 Jun 2016	n/a	BTN254	BZN258	BN01	BRN52	ACN54	371+1W	230t	114m	Gain BZN258.	
N	18	By 09 Jun 2016	09 Sep 2016	n/a	n/a	n/a	BN01	BRN52	ACN54	207	130t	69m	Z cars withdrawn account bogie cracking issues.	
FN	18	09 Sep 2016	c. 2016	n/a	n/a	BZN275	BN01	BRN52	ACN54	283+1W	180t	91m	BZN275 returned to service	
VN	18	c. 2016	c. 2023	n/a	BTN253	BZN275	BN01	BRN52	ACN54	371+1W	230t	114m	Gain BTN253 ex VN17	
VN	18	c. 2023		n/a	n/a	n/a	BN01	BRN52	ACN54	371+1W	230t	?	Preserved on the Daylesford Country Spa railway	
N	19	06 Apr 1984	By 10 May 1986	n/a	n/a	n/a	BN55	BRN56	ACN57	207	130t	69m	As Built.	
N	19	10 May 1986	By 2005	n/a	n/a	n/a	BN55	BRN56	ACN57	207	130t	69m	Repainted V/ Line orange with green and white stripes.	
N	19	By 2005		n/a	n/a	n/a	BN55	BRN56	ACN57	207	130t	69m	Repainted. Fitted with power doors in 2005.	Last set to be (re)painted orange before red livery introduced.
FN	19	By 27 Dec 2007	Post 27 Dec 2007	n/a	n/a	B??2??	BN55	BRN56	ACN57		180t	91m	Z car added, number 264-276 range.	
FN	19	Post 27 Dec 2007		n/a	n/a	B??2??	BN55	BRN56	ACN57		180t	91m	Repainted	
"FN"	19	Post 27 Dec 2007	By 23 Sep 2016	n/a	n/a	n/a	BN55	BRN56	ACN57	207	130t	69m	Z cars withdrawn due to bogie cracking problem. Cars absorbed into set "FN"08 as temporary measure.	
FN	19	By 23 Sep 2016	By 11 Oct 2016	n/a	n/a	BZN273	BN55	BRN56	ACN57	283+1W	180t	91m		
FN	19	By 11 Oct 2016		n/a	n/a	BZN265	BN55	BRN56	ACN57	283+1W	180t	91m	Swap BZN273 for BZN265.	
VN	19	?		n/a	BCZ257	BZN271	BN55	BRN56	ACN57	335+1W	230t	114m	Gain BZN271 ex FN11 and BCZ257 ex FN09.	
VN	19		Current	n/a	BZN271	BZN275	BN55	BRN56	ACN57	335+1W	230t	114m	Lose BCZ257. Gain BZN275	

== Image gallery ==
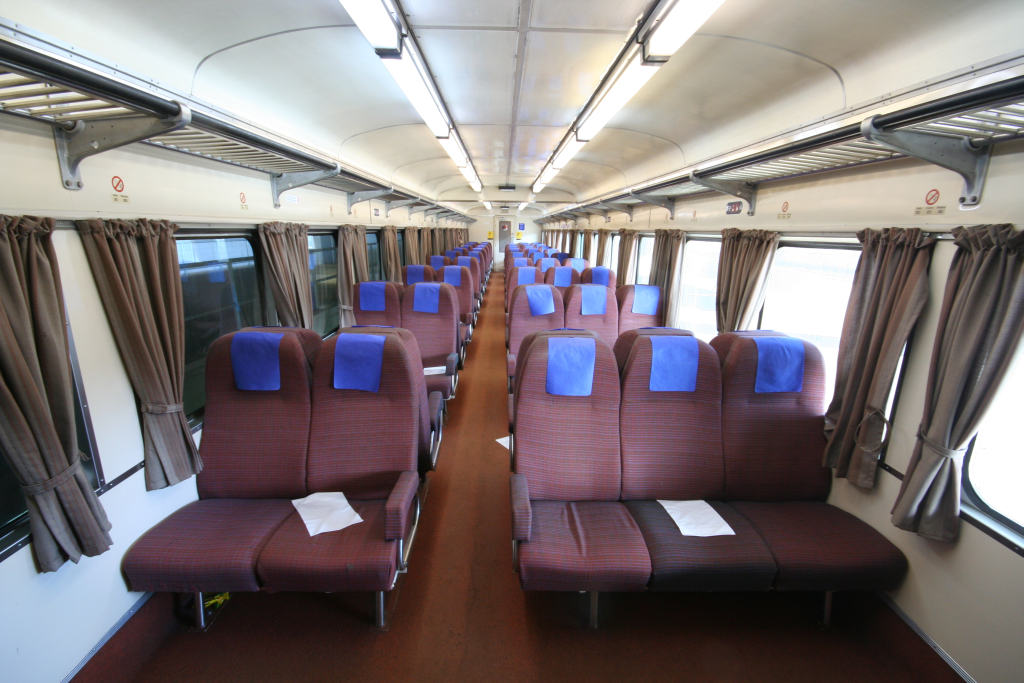
Interior of an unrefurbished economy-class carriage, 2008

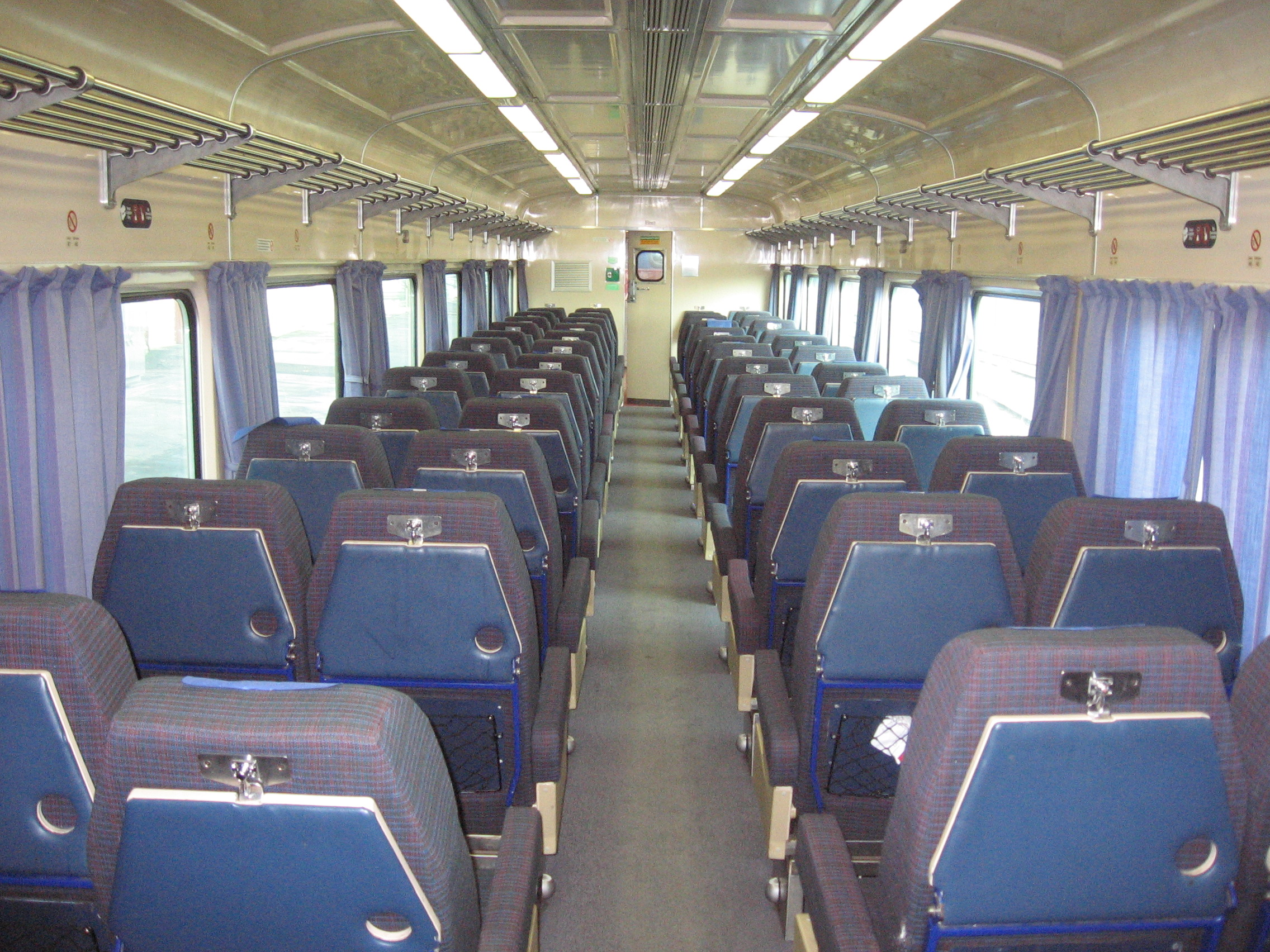
Interior of an unrefurbished first-class carriage, 2008
