= Pyramid railway station =

Railway station in Pyramid, Victoria, Australia

Pyramid
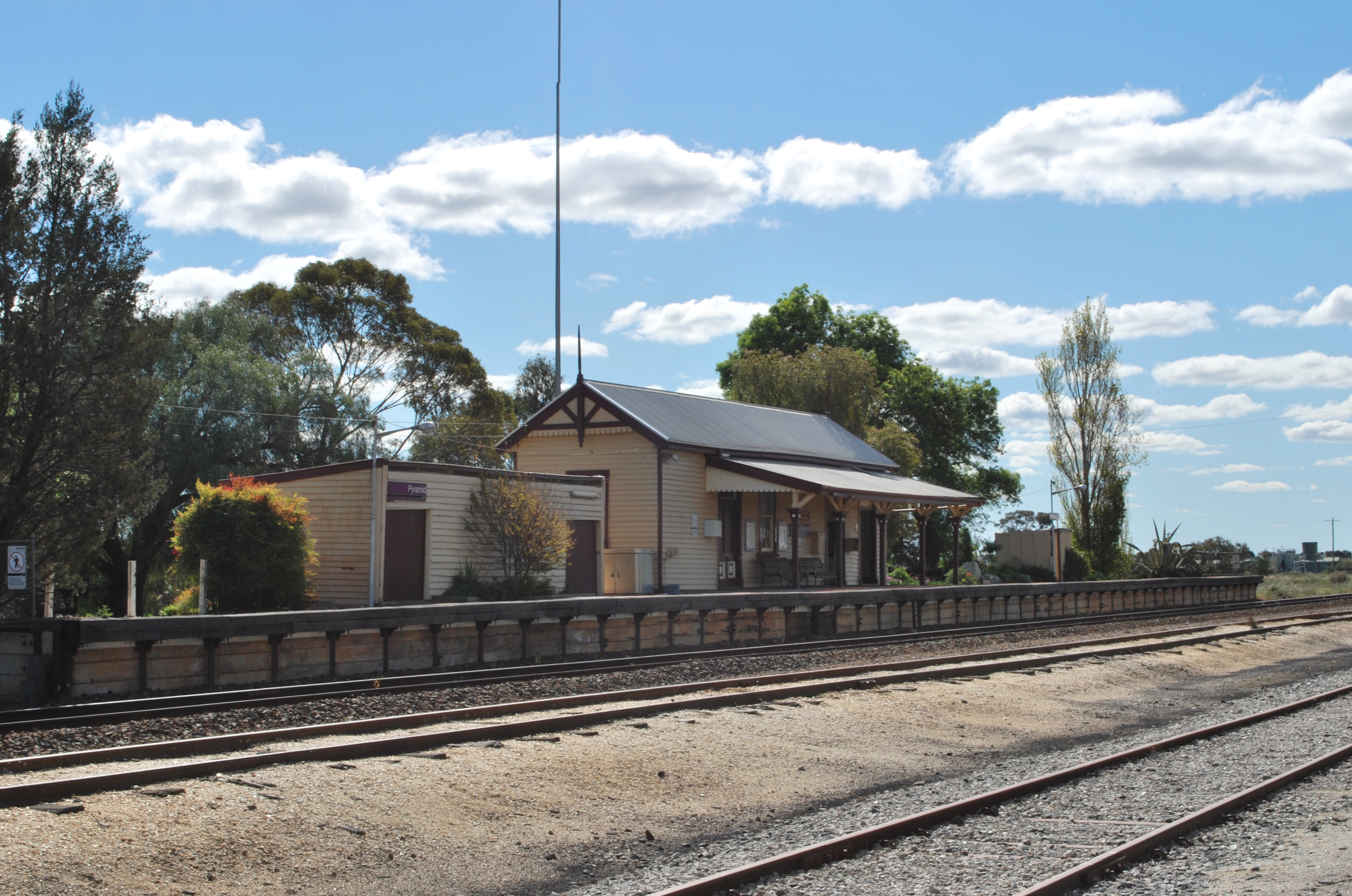
- Westbound view of the station building and platform, October 2012

General information
- Location: Railway Avenue, Pyramid Hill, Victoria 3575; Shire of Loddon; Australia
- Coordinates: 36°03′10″S 144°06′47″E
- System: PTV regional rail station
- Owner: VicTrack
- Operator: V/Line
- Line: Swan Hill (Piangil)
- Distance: 249.35 kilometres from Southern Cross
- Platforms: 1
- Tracks: 3
- Connections: Coach

Construction
- Structure type: At-grade
- Parking: Yes
- Accessible: Yes

Other information
- Status: Operational, unstaffed
- Station code: PYD
- Fare zone: Myki zone 20/21
- Website: Public Transport Victoria

History
- Opened: 12 February 1884; 142 years ago
- Former names: Pyramid Hill (1884-1904)

Services
Two daily services in both directions.
Preceding station	V/Line	Following station
Dingee towards Southern Cross	Swan Hill line	Kerang towards Swan Hill
Former service
Preceding station	Disused railways	Following station
Mitiamo	Piangil line	Macorna

Victorian Heritage Register
- Official name: Pyramid Hill Railway Station
- Designated: 20 August 1982
- Reference no.: H1696
Location
- Location within Victoria

Pyramid railway station is located on the Piangil line in Victoria, Australia. It serves the town of Pyramid Hill, and it opened on 12 February 1884 as Pyramid Hill. It was renamed Pyramid on 9 May 1904.

== History ==
Pyramid opened on 12 February 1884. On 25 October 1884, the line was extended to Kerang. The station, like the township itself, was named by the explorer Thomas Mitchell, who set up base with his party near a feature he named Pyramid Hill on 29 June 1836. Mitchell noted that the hill resembled the pyramids of Egypt.

A disused goods shed and silos are located opposite the station.

The former No. 2 track was abolished in June 1988, along with the up and down end plunger-locked points leading to it. The up and down points were realigned to connect to No. 3 track.

Pyramid was closed as a crossing station on 31 December 1993.

There is a disused station at Mitiamo, which is between Pyramid and Dingee, and there is also a disused station at Macorna, between Pyramid and Kerang.

Pyramid station is one of the least-used railway stations in Victoria and the second least-used station on the Swan Hill line behind Dingee, having only 2,670 passengers in the 2016-2017 financial year. That equates to around 7.31 passengers per day.

== Incidents and accidents ==
On 21 August 2025, a passenger attempted to alight from a train at Pyramid at 9:45pm. Due to the train being longer than the station platform, there was no platform behind the door he opened, and he tripped and fell onto the track, breaking his leg. A warning had been given over the train's PA system, advising that passengers should only exit by doors at the front of the train due to the short platform length. The Office of the National Rail Safety Regulator said it had begun an inquiry into the incident.

== Platforms and services ==
Pyramid has one platform, and is served by V/Line Swan Hill line trains.

Pyramid platform arrangement
Platform	Line	Destination	Via	Source
1	Swan Hill line	Southern Cross, Swan Hill	Bendigo	

There are infrequent services operating on the Swan Hill line including those stopping at Pyramid. Currently, there are only two trains in each direction stopping each day.

== Transport links ==
V/Line operates a road coach service from Bendigo to Swan Hill and Mildura via Pyramid station.
