= Kamarooka =

Kamarooka Bendigo, Victoria
- Coordinates: 36°28′S 144°20′E
- Population: 89 (2021 census)
- Postcode(s): 3570
- LGA(s): City of Greater Bendigo; Shire of Loddon
- State electorate(s): Bendigo East
- Federal division(s): Bendigo; Mallee

Kamarooka is a locality in the City of Greater Bendigo and the Shire of Loddon, Victoria, Australia. At the 2021 census, Kamarooka had a population of 89.

== History ==
Kamarooka was originally called "Piccaninny Creek Station" after a large pastoral run in the area. It was then renamed "Kamarooka" from an Aboriginal word meaning "Wait a while". In 1901 a Methodist church opened and the public hall was built.
