= Kamarooka North =

- Town
- Coordinates: 36°23′36″S 144°18′05″E
- Country: Australia
- State: Victoria
- LGA: Shire of Loddon

Government
  - State electorate: Bendigo East
  - Federal division: Mallee

Population
  - Total: 9 (2021 census)
- Postcode: 3571

Kamarooka North is a locality in the Shire of Loddon, Victoria, Australia. At the 2021 census, Kamarooka North had a population of 9.
