= Auchmore =

- Town
- Coordinates: 36°28′37″S 144°5′31″E
- Country: Australia
- State: Victoria
- LGA: Shire of Loddon

Government
  - State electorate: Bendigo East
  - Federal division: Mallee

Population
  - Total: 0 (2021 census)
- Postcode: 3570

Auchmore (/ˈɔːkmoː/ AUK-mor) a is locality in Shire of Loddon, Victoria, Australia. At the 2021 census, Auchmore had "no people or a very low population".
