= Raywood railway station =

Railway station in Victoria, Australia

Raywood
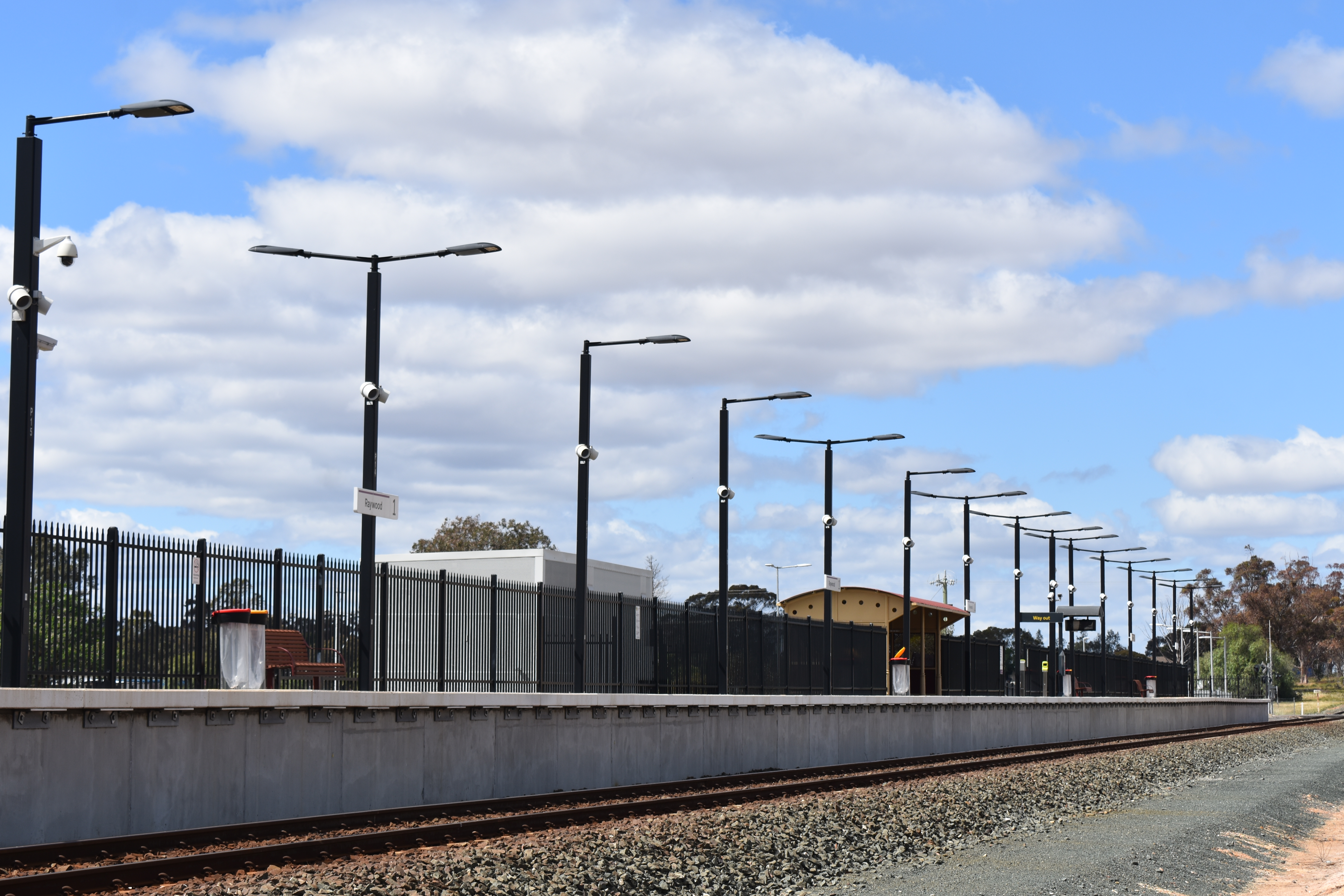
- Southbound view of the station platform, November 2025

General information
- Location: Inglewood Street; Raywood, Victoria; City of Greater Bendigo; Australia
- Coordinates: 36°31′58″S 144°12′06″E
- System: PTV regional rail station
- Owner: VicTrack
- Operator: V/Line
- Line: Swan Hill (Piangil)
- Distance: 192.99 kilometres from Southern Cross
- Platforms: 1
- Tracks: 1

Construction
- Structure type: At-grade

Other information
- Status: Operational, unstaffed
- Station code: ROD
- Fare zone: Myki zone 15/16
- Website: Public Transport Victoria

History
- Opened: 15 December 1882
- Closed: 4 October 1981
- Rebuilt: 17 July 2022; 4 years ago

Services
Preceding station	V/Line	Following station
Eaglehawk towards Southern Cross	Swan Hill line	Dingee towards Swan Hill
Former services
Preceding station	Disused railways	Following station
Eaglehawk	Yungera line (line open)	Dingee
Location
- Location within Victoria

Raywood railway station is a railway station in the town of Raywood, Victoria, Australia. A station at Raywood originally opened in 1882, on what is now the Piangil line, but closed to passenger traffic on 4 October 1981, as part of the New Deal timetable for country passengers.

A new station, located north of the Inglewood Street level crossing, at the site of the former station, opened on 17 July 2022 as part of the Regional Rail Revival project.

== Platforms and services ==
Raywood has one platform, and is served by Swan Hill line trains.

Raywood platform arrangement
Platform	Line	Destination	Via	Source
1	Swan Hill line	Southern Cross, Swan Hill	Bendigo	
