= Raywood, Victoria =

Raywood
- Town
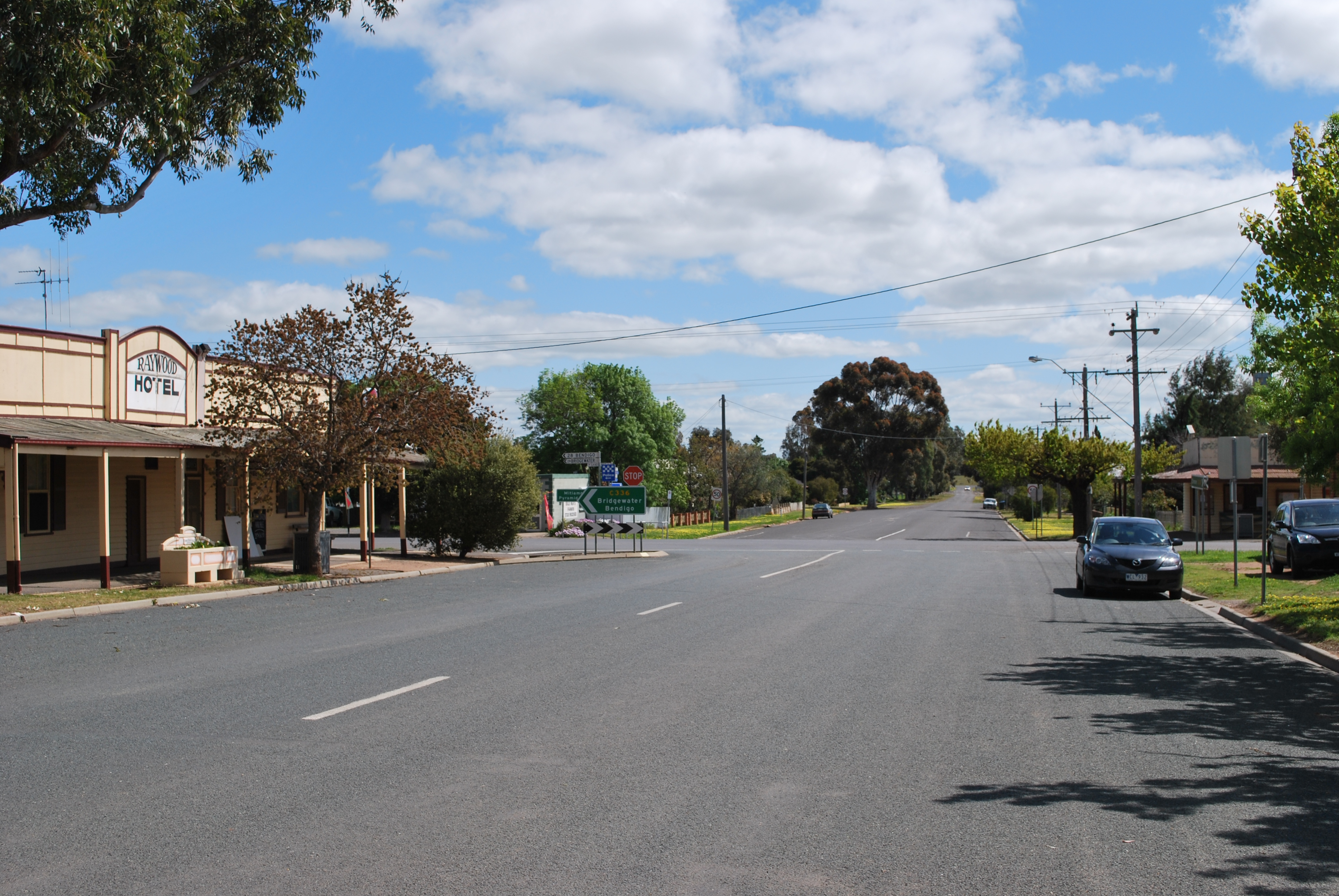
- Raywood, with the hotel on the left and the general store on the opposite right corner

- Interactive map of Raywood
- Coordinates: 36°32′0″S 144°13′0″E
- Country: Australia
- State: Victoria
- City: Bendigo
- LGA: City of Greater Bendigo
- Location: 185 km (115 mi) N of Melbourne; 29 km (18 mi) N of Bendigo

Government
  - State electorate: Bendigo East
  - Federal divisions: Bendigo; Mallee

Population
  - Total: 329 (2021 census)
- Postcode: 3570

Raywood is a town in the City of Greater Bendigo, Victoria, Australia. The town is in located 185 kilometres (115 mi) north of the state capital, Melbourne. At the 2021 census, Raywood had a population of 329.

Raywood Golf Club is located on Speke Street. The Bendigo Gliding Club is located in Raywood.

== History ==
Raywood was named after an early gold 'digger' who worked on that field. Raywood Post Office opened on 4 January 1864.

== See also ==
- Raywood railway station
