= Piangil railway line =

Partially closed railway line in Victoria, Australia

Piangil
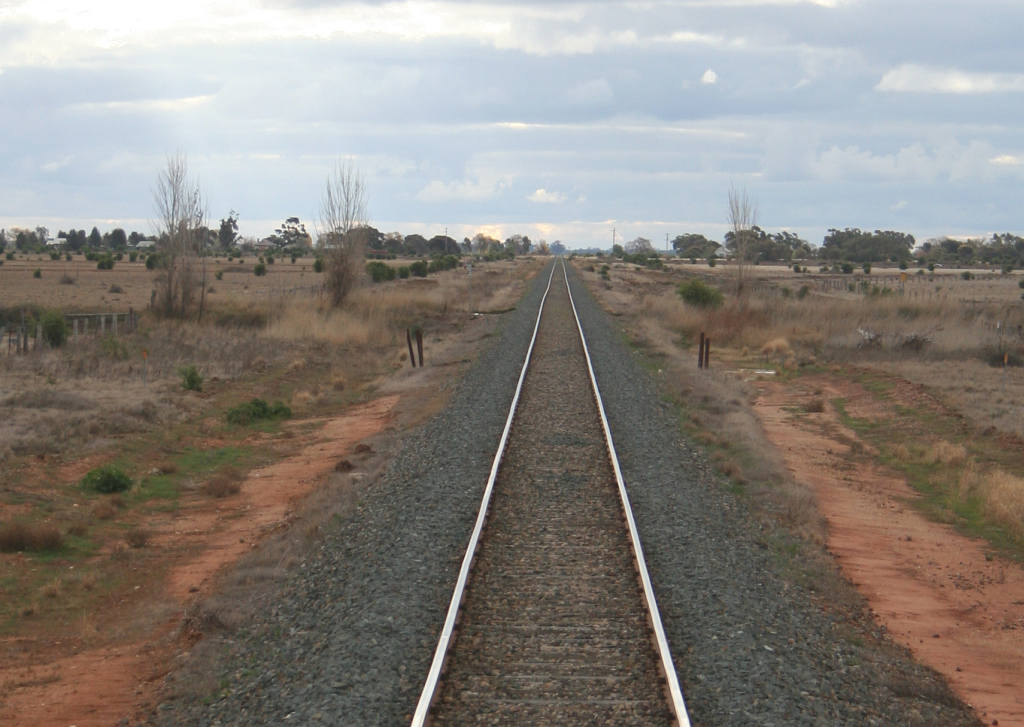
- The line near Pyramid station, 2006

Overview
- Other names: Yungera; Swan Hill
- Status: Operational between Piangil and Bendigo, closed beyond Piangil.
- Owner: VicTrack
- Locale: Victoria, Australia
- Termini: Yungera; Bendigo

Service
- Type: Heavy rail
- Services: Bendigo; Swan Hill
- Operator(s): Passenger: V/Line; Freight: Pacific National

History
- Completed: 1926

Technical
- Line length: 225.2 km (139.9 mi)
- Num of tracks: 1
- Track gauge: 1,600 mm (5 ft 3 in)
- Electrification: None
- Signalling: Train Order Working

The Piangil railway line is a 5 ft 3 in (1,600 mm) gauge railway line in north-western Victoria, Australia. It branches off the Deniliquin line just north of Bendigo, and runs in a north-westerly direction through Pyramid Hill and Kerang to the border town of Swan Hill. It then parallels the New South Wales border to Piangil. The line formerly ran to a terminus at Yungera, but is now open only as far as Piangil. Passenger services only operate to Swan Hill.

== History ==
The line was opened from its junction with the Deniliquin line, just north of Bendigo, to Raywood in 1882. It was progressively extended to Mitiamo in 1883, Pyramid and Kerang in 1884, and Swan Hill in 1890. The line from Swan Hill was extended to Piangil in 1915, Kooloonong in 1920, and Yungera in 1926. The section from Kooloonong to Yungera was closed in 1957, and from Piangil to Kooloonong in 1981. Parts of the former route beyond Piangil, including all of it beyond Kooloonong, are preserved as the Piangil Yungera Railway Bushland Reserve.

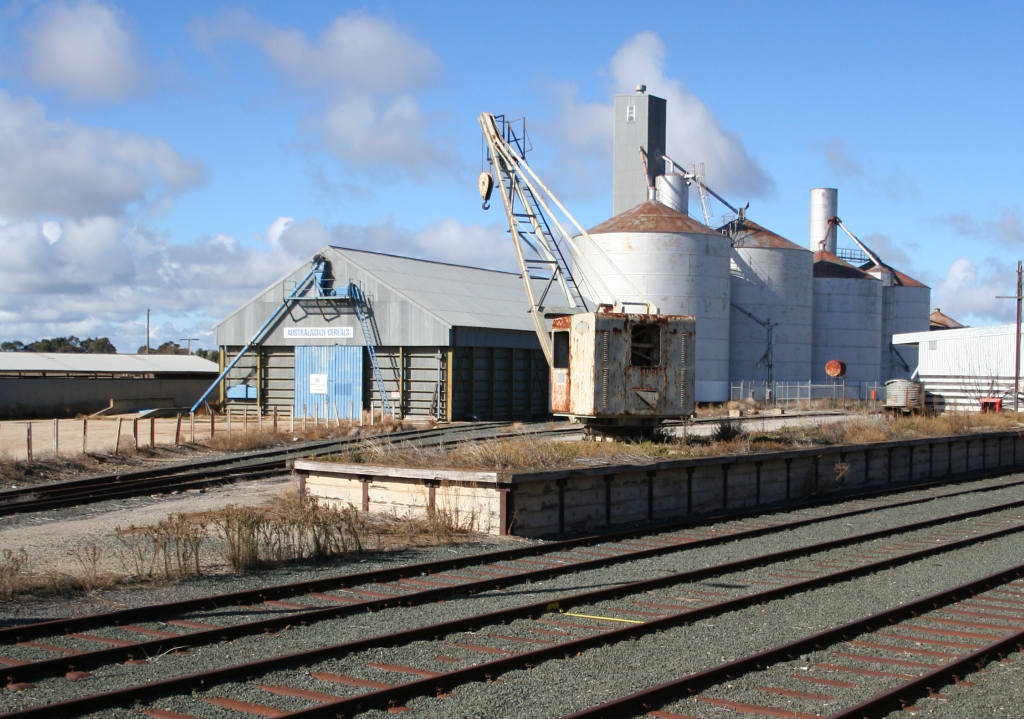
Silos and goods crane at Kerang

The Koondrook branch line, built and operated by the Shire of Kerang, was opened in 1886. It was acquired by the Victorian Railways in 1952 and closed in 1981. Under the 1922 Border Railways Act, a branch opened from Kerang to Murrabit in 1924, which was extended across the New South Wales border at the Murray River to Stony Crossing in 1928. Passenger services on the section beyond Murrabit had ended by 1932, and all services were suspended in 1943. Passenger services to Murrabit had ceased by the end of 1941, and the line to Murrabit closed in 1961.

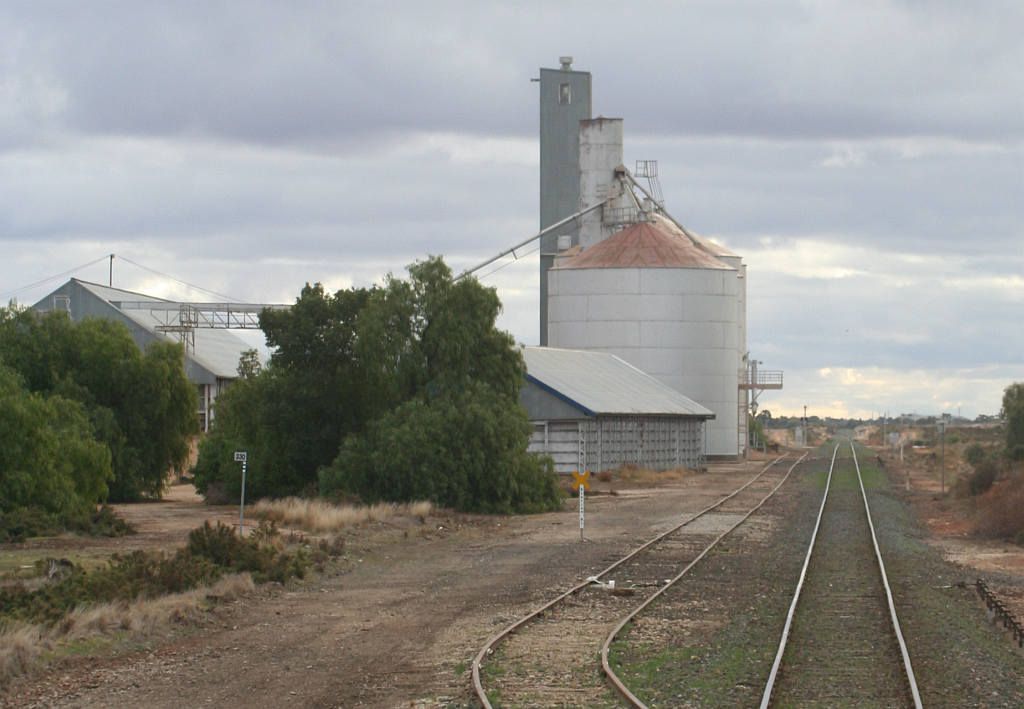
Silos and loop siding at Lake Boga

The last passenger service from Swan Hill to Woorinen, a service for school children that was paid for by the Victorian Education Department and run by a 102 hp (76 kW) Walker railmotor, was withdrawn on 17 December 1976. The last passenger service from Swan Hill to Piangil ran on 24 December 1976, again using a 102 hp Walker. Both services were replaced by coaches.

== Proposed upgrade and extension ==
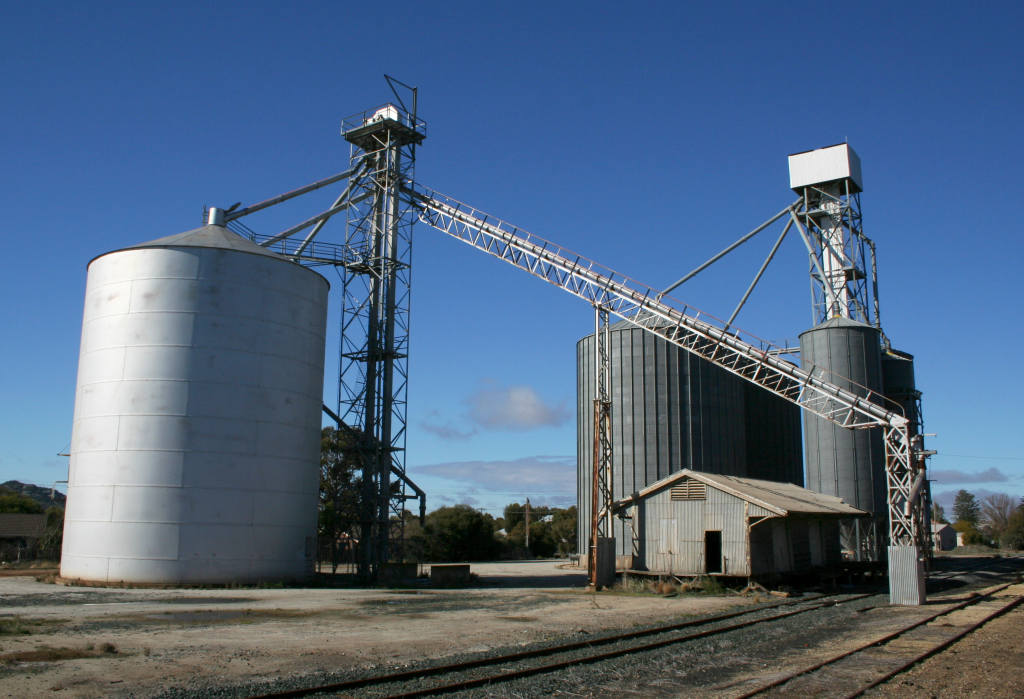
Silos and goods shed at Pyramid

In April 2008, it was announced that the Swan Hill – Piangil section of the track, along with six other lines, would be upgraded under a $23.7 million package of improvements to the Victorian core grain network.

In October 2010, the Victorian government released a report into public transport options for the north-west of Victoria, which analysed nine proposals for improving services to the city of Mildura. One alternative investigated was an extension of the railway from Swan Hill to connect to the Mildura railway line at Ouyen.

As part of the Regional Rail Revival program, a new station at Raywood opened on 17 July 2022, replacing the old station 100 metres (110 yd) down the track.

== Passenger services ==
Some Bendigo V/Line passenger trains extend their services to Eaglehawk on weekdays. Dedicated Swan Hill passenger services serve the remainder of the operating stations on the line and Eaglehawk.

=== Swan Hill services ===
Swan Hill

Overview
- Service type: Regional rail
- Status: Operational
- Locale: Victoria, Australia
- Current operator: V/Line

Route
- Termini: Swan Hill; Southern Cross
- Stops: 15
- Distance travelled: 347.3 km (215.8 mi)
- Average journey time: 4 hours 40 minutes
- Service frequency: 2 return services daily
- Line used: Piangil

On-board services
- Classes: First and economy
- Disabled access: Limited
- Seating arrangements: Yes
- Catering facilities: Yes

Technical
- Rolling stock: N set
- Track gauge: 1,600 mm (5 ft 3 in)
- Electrification: None
- Operating speed: 65km/h at North Bendigo Junction - Eaglehawk 80km/h at North Bendigo Junction - Bendigo and From (Swan Hill) Bryan Street PCR to Swan Hill Station 90km/h from Victoria Street PCR (Kerang) to Bryan Street PCR (Swan Hill) 100km/h from Eaglehawk to Wellington Street PCR (Kerang)
- Track owner: VicTrack

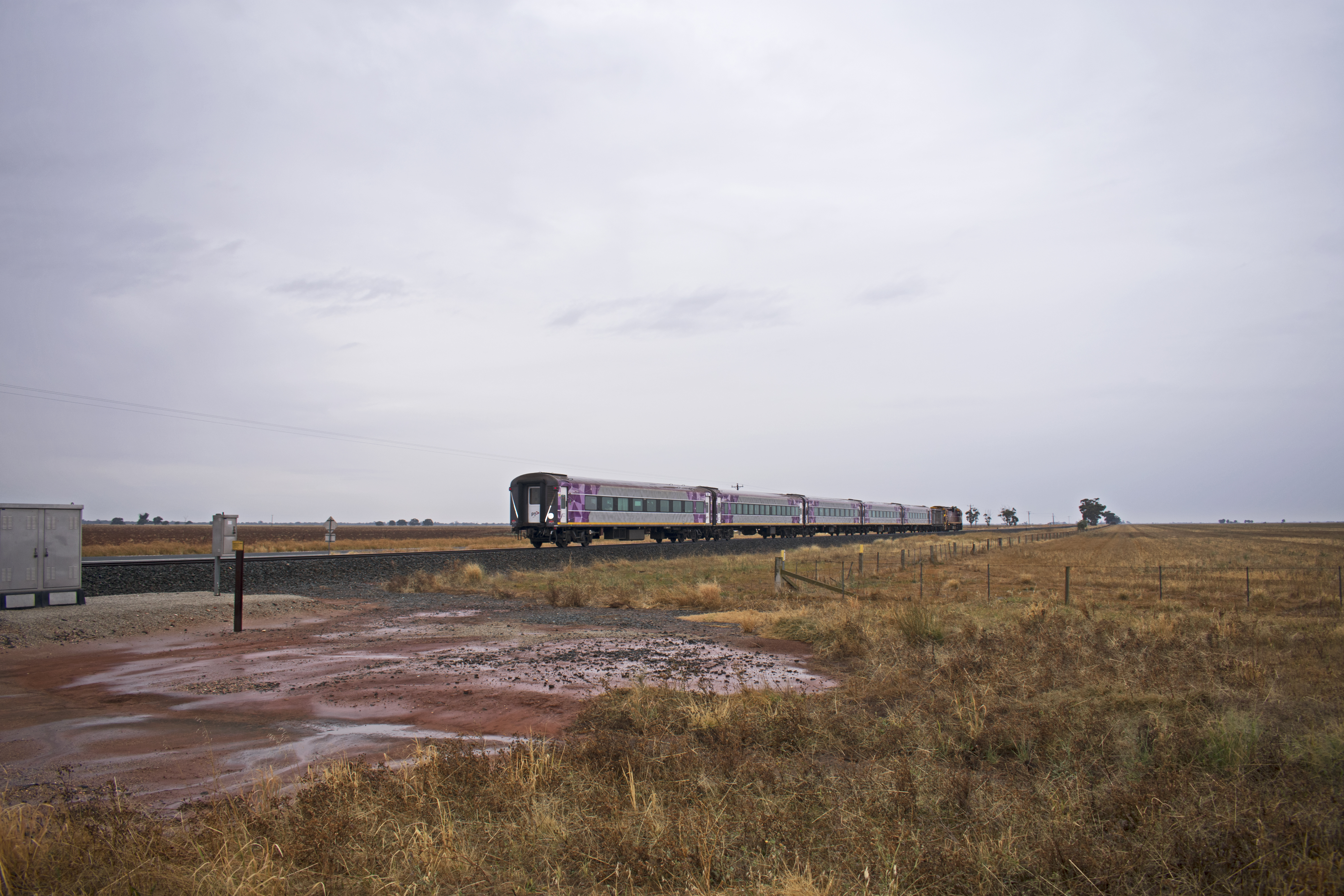
Passenger train south of Mitiamo

Two services operate daily in each direction between Swan Hill and Southern Cross station in Melbourne. In metropolitan Melbourne, services only stop at Watergardens and Footscray stations, setting down passengers only on services to Southern Cross and picking up passengers only on services to Swan Hill. Outside Melbourne, services do not stop at Macedon, Riddells Creek or Clarkefield. Malmsbury is only served by one weekday service to Swan Hill, and Kangaroo Flat is only served on weekdays. All Swan Hill services stop at all other operating stations, both picking up and setting down passengers. As of 31 March 2025, the Swan Hill line is the only remaining line using the loco hauled V/Line N class with N type carriages as all services to Warrnambool, Albury, Bairnsdale and Shepparton are now fully operated by the V/Line VLocity.

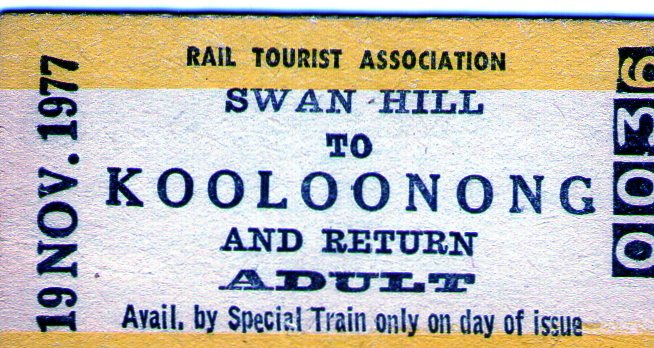
Swan Hill-Kooloonong rail ticket 1977

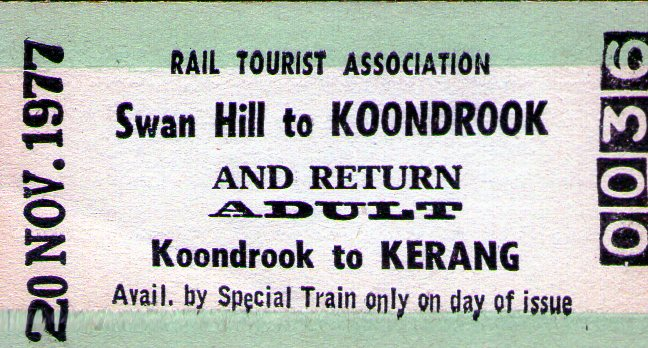
Swan Hill-Koondrook rail ticket 1977

== Incidents ==
On 5 June 2007, a fatal crash occurred when a semi-trailer ran into a train at a level crossing near Kerang. Eleven people died, all of whom were passengers on the train.
