= List of V/Line railway stations =

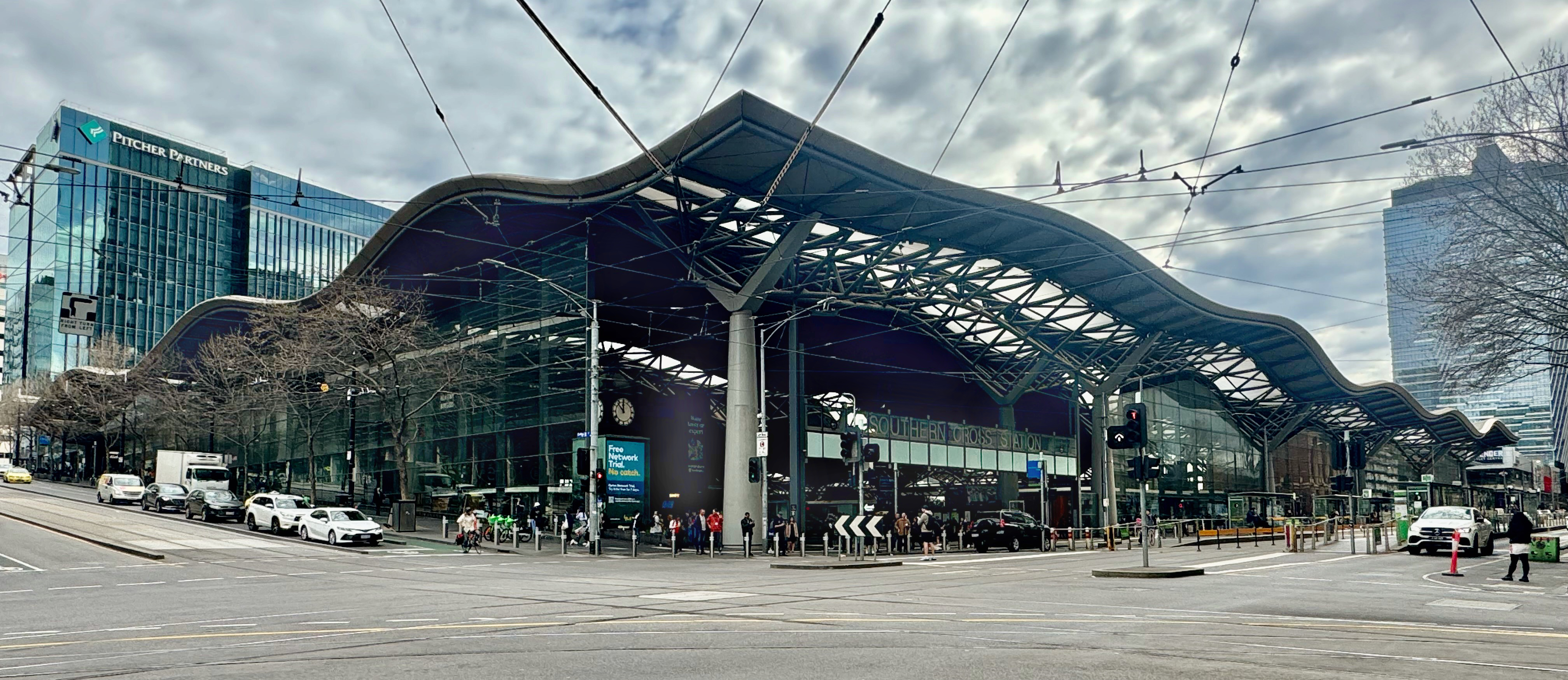
Southern Cross station is the hub of regional rail passenger services

The Victorian rail network

V/Line is the operator of regional rail services in the Australian state of Victoria. The stations are located on 13 passenger train lines, which all operate from Southern Cross station in Melbourne.

Stations listed in bold are terminus stations. Frequent services operate to the major regional cities of Ballarat, Bendigo, Geelong, Seymour, and the Latrobe Valley; with a smaller number of services continuing to the end of their respective lines.

== North ==
Frequent services operate to Bendigo, with some trains continuing to either Echuca or Swan Hill.

=== Bendigo line ===
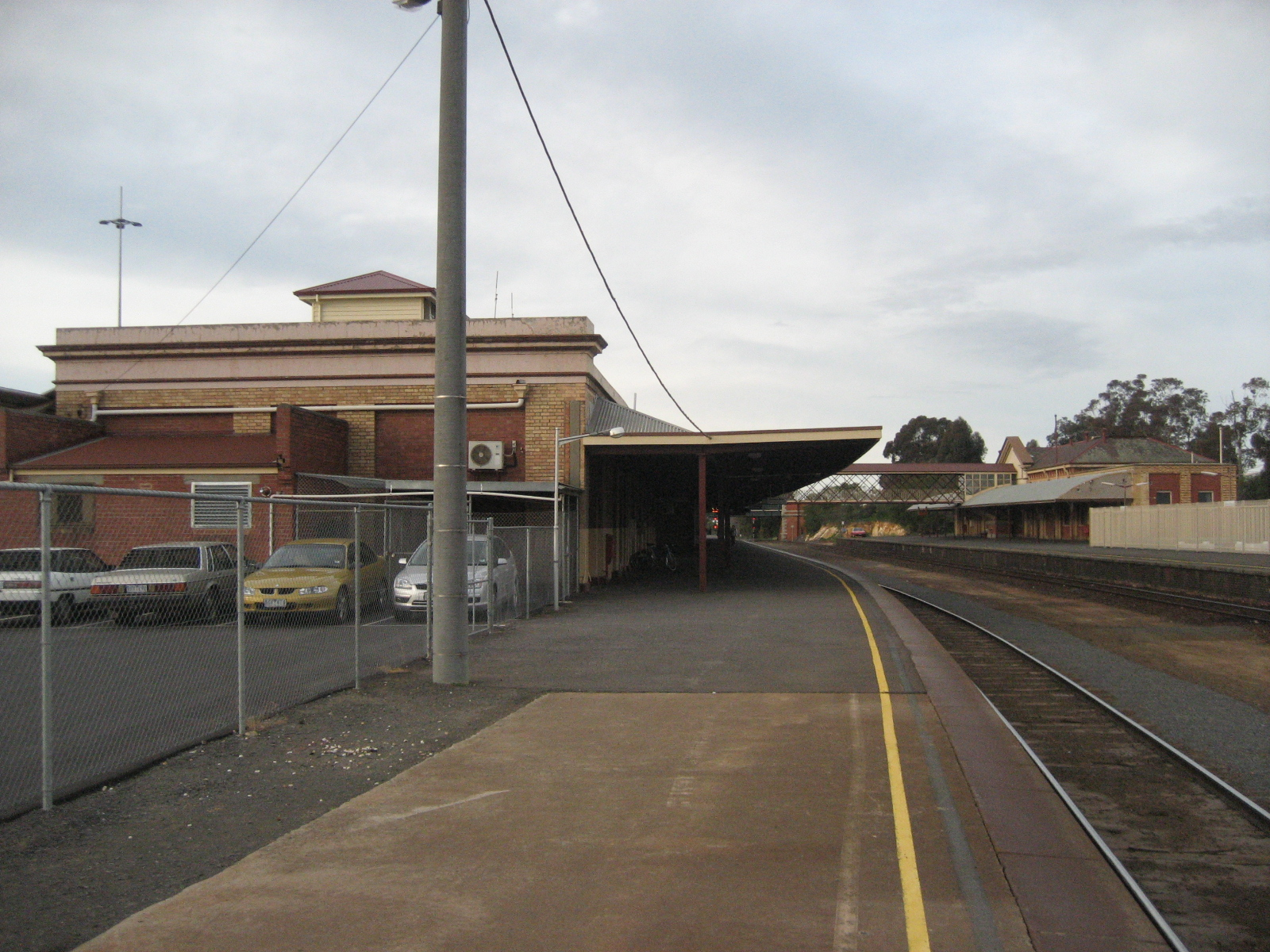
Bendigo Station

The line continues on from the Sunbury suburban line at Sunbury.

- **Sunbury** (suburban station) - Opened on 10 February 1859
- Clarkefield
- Riddells Creek
- Gisborne
- Macedon
- Woodend
- Kyneton
- Malmsbury
- Castlemaine
- Kangaroo Flat

Bendigo

In addition to this, most Bendigo line services continue north of Bendigo to various stations serving suburbs and towns surrounding Bendigo, as part of the Bendigo Metro project.

- **Services from Bendigo continuing north**

Branch 1

- Eaglehawk
- Raywood

Branch 2

- Epsom
- Huntly
- Goornong

=== Echuca line ===
The line continues from the Bendigo line at Goornong.

- Elmore
- Rochester
- **Echuca**

=== Swan Hill line ===
The line continues from the Bendigo line at Raywood.

- Dingee
- Pyramid
- Kerang
- **Swan Hill**

== North east ==
Frequent services operate to Seymour, with some trains continuing to Shepparton. The Albury line is no longer connected to the other 2.

=== Seymour line ===
The line continues on from the Craigieburn suburban line at Craigieburn.

- Craigieburn (suburban station)
- Donnybrook
- Wallan
- Heathcote Junction
- Wandong
- Kilmore East
- Broadford
- Tallarook
- **Seymour**

=== Albury line ===
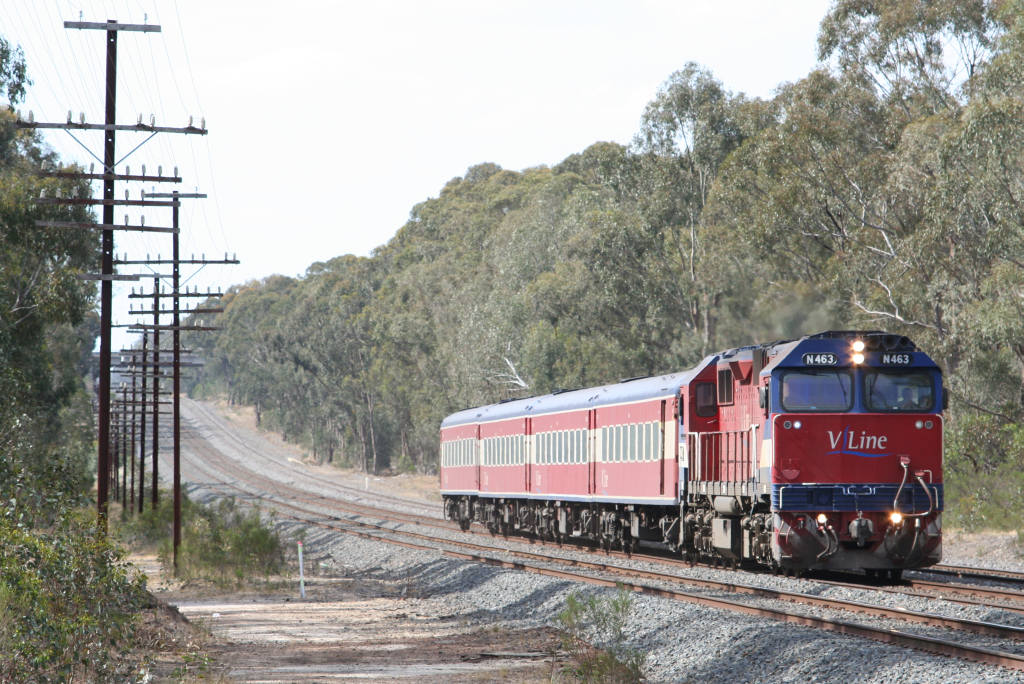
Albury line service Melbourne bound, outside Seymour

The Albury-Wodonga line was formerly the only broad gauge line operated by V/Line to cross the border into New South Wales, with the primary terminus being located in the New South Wales town of Albury. Between 2008 and 2011, the broad gauge line was closed for conversion. This means the line can no longer be considered an extension of some Seymour line services.

- **Southern Cross**
- Broadmeadows
- **Seymour**
- Avenel
- Euroa
- Violet Town
- Benalla
- Wangaratta
- Springhurst
- Chiltern
- Wodonga
- **Albury**

NSW regional rail operator NSW TrainLink operates the inter-capital XPT service between Melbourne and Sydney, which stops at Broadmeadows, Seymour, Benalla, Wangaratta and Albury.

=== Shepparton line ===
The line branches from the North East line at Seymour.

- **Seymour**
- Nagambie
- Murchison East
- Mooroopna
- **Shepparton**

== East ==
Frequent services operate to Traralgon, with some trains continuing to Bairnsdale.

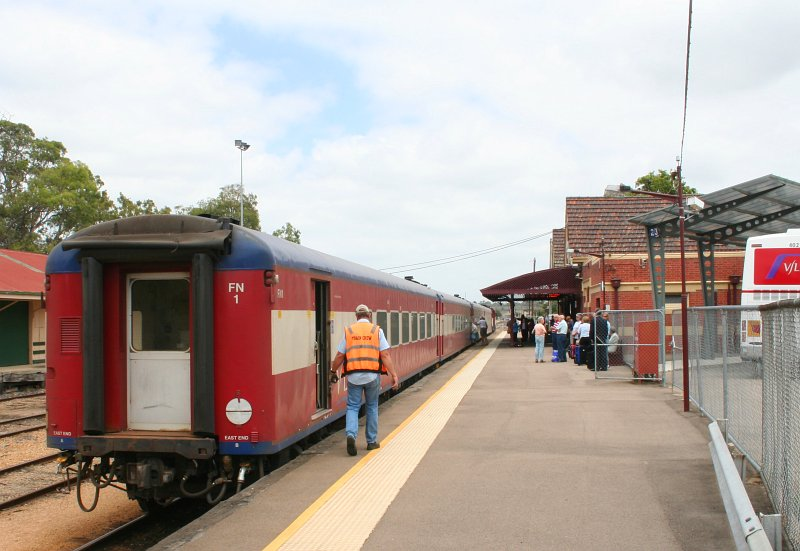
N set train at Bairnsdale Station

=== Traralgon line ===
The line continues on from the Pakenham suburban line at Pakenham.

- Richmond (suburban station)
- Caulfield (suburban station)
- Clayton (suburban station)
- Dandenong (suburban station)
- **Pakenham** (suburban station)
- Nar Nar Goon
- Tynong
- Garfield
- Bunyip
- Longwarry
- Drouin
- **Warragul**
- Yarragon
- Trafalgar
- Moe
- Morwell
- **Traralgon**

=== Bairnsdale line ===
The line continues from the Traralgon line at Traralgon.

- Rosedale
- **Sale**
- Stratford
- **Bairnsdale**

== West ==
Frequent services operate to Ballarat, with some trains continuing to Ararat. Some services also run to Maryborough as shuttle services from Ballarat.

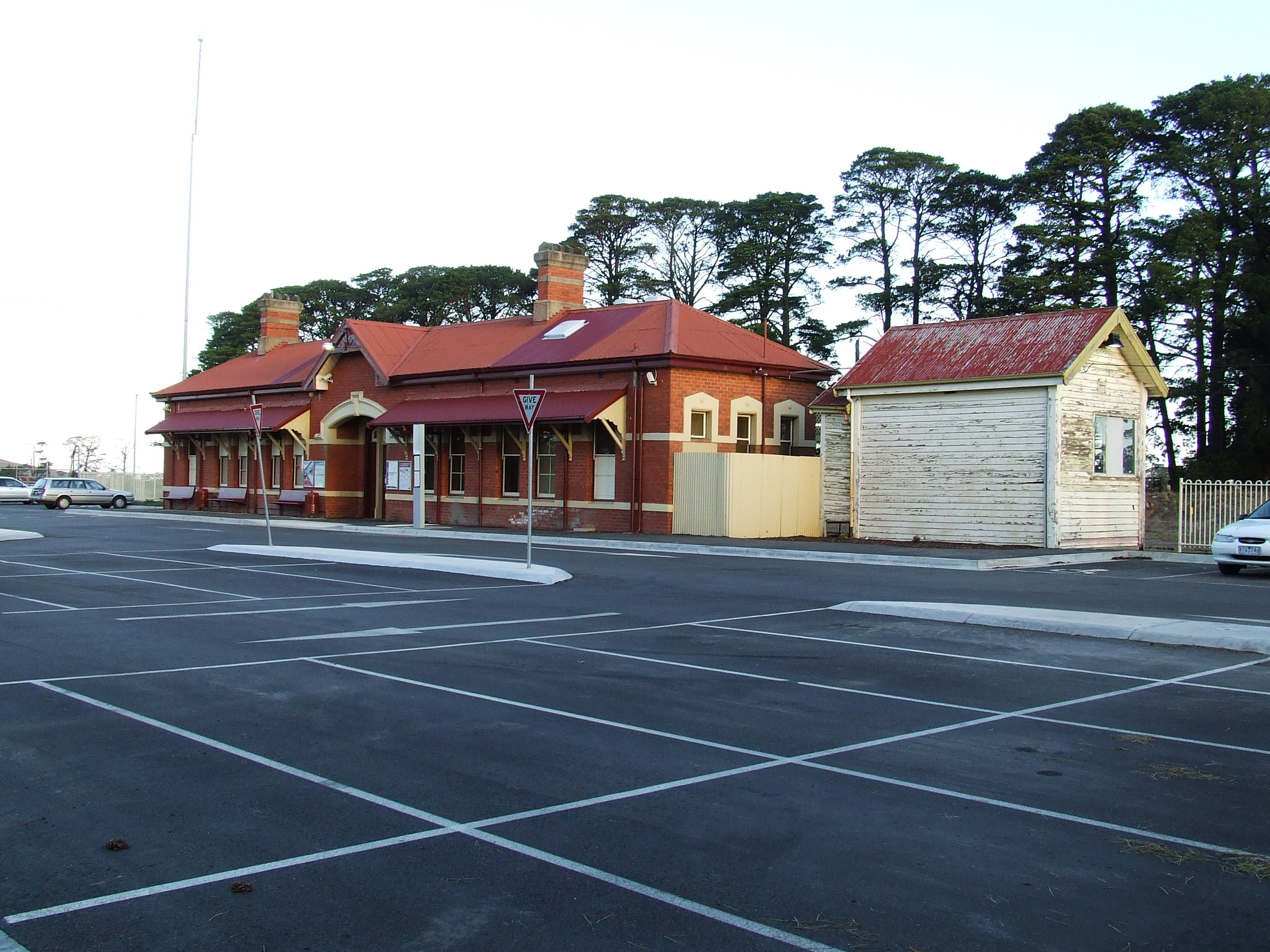
Ballan Station

=== Ballarat line ===
The line branches from the Sunbury suburban line at Sunshine.

- Sunshine (suburban station)
- Ardeer
- Deer Park
- Caroline Springs
- Rockbank
- Cobblebank
- **Melton**
- **Bacchus Marsh**
- Ballan
- **Ballarat**
- **Wendouree**

=== Ararat line ===
The Ballarat - Ararat section of the line was closed from 1994 until 10 July 2004, when it was reopened for a twice-daily service as part of the Linking Victoria Project. Services now run 5 times per day.

Continues from the Ballarat line service.

- **Wendouree**
- Beaufort
- **Ararat**

=== Maryborough line ===
The Mildura railway line was closed by the Kennett Government in 1993 after the withdrawal of The Vinelander service.

As part of the Victorian Transport Plan, passenger services resumed on the Mildura line to Maryborough on 25 July 2010. Services operate 2 times per day, as shuttles from Ballarat.

Connects to a train from Melbourne

- **Ballarat**
- Creswick
- Clunes
- Talbot
- **Maryborough**

== South west ==
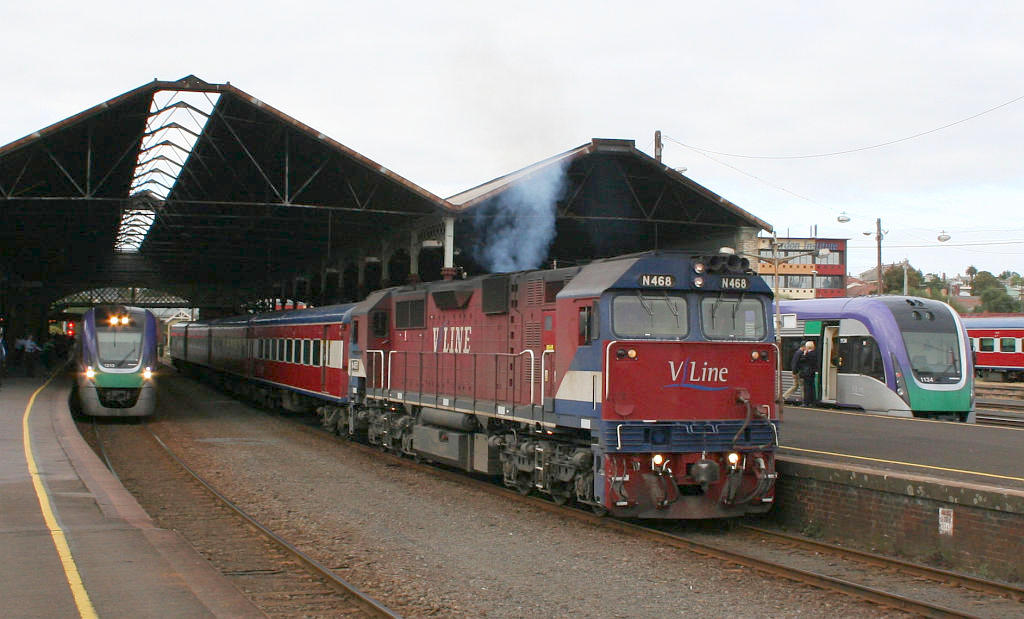
V/Line trains at Geelong station

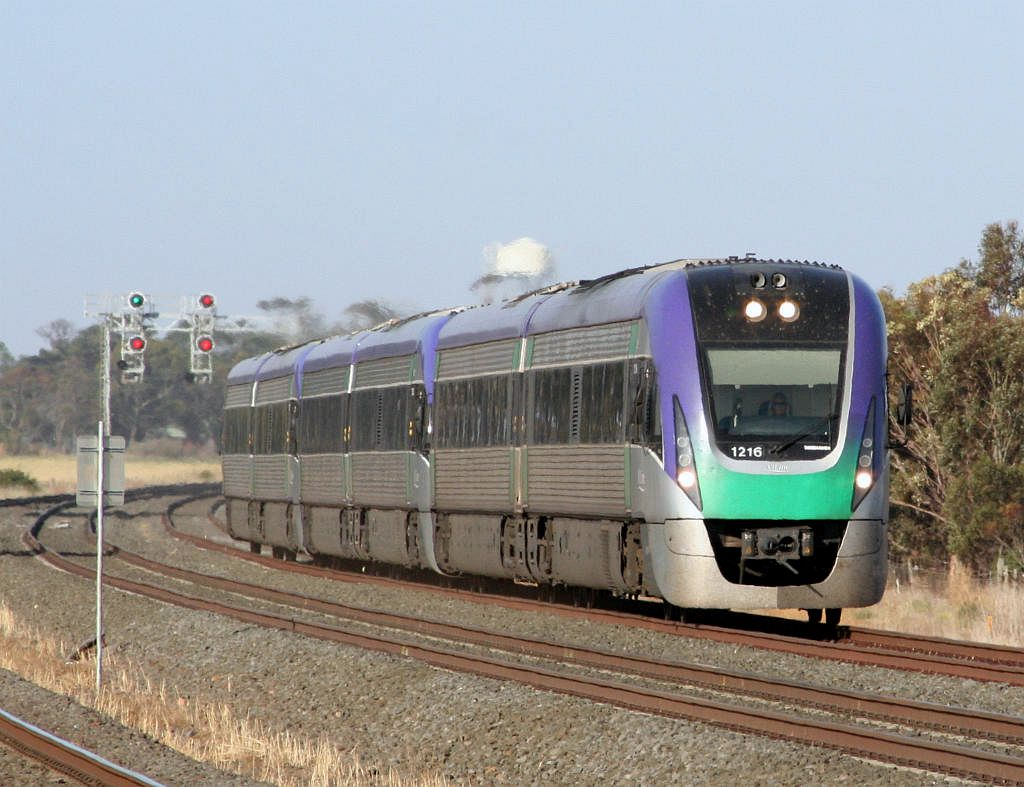
V/Line VLocity train near Little River

Frequent services operate to Geelong, with some trains continuing to Warrnambool.

=== Geelong line ===
The line runs on the dedicated Regional Rail Link tracks from Southern Cross station

- Footscray (suburban station)
- Sunshine (suburban station)
- Ardeer
- Deer Park
- Tarneit
- West Tarneit
- **Wyndham Vale**
- Little River
- Lara
- Corio
- North Shore (Interchange with The Overland services to Adelaide)
- North Geelong
- **Geelong**
- **South Geelong** (terminus for every other train in weekday off peak)
- Marshall
- **Waurn Ponds**

=== Warrnambool line ===
From mid-1993 to 31 August 2004, the Warrnambool service was operated by the now-defunct West Coast Railway.

Continues from the Geelong line service

- Winchelsea
- Birregurra
- Colac
- Camperdown
- Terang
- Sherwood Park
- **Warrnambool**

These trains also connect with coach services to Port Fairy, Portland and Mount Gambier.

== Passenger lines proposed for reopening ==
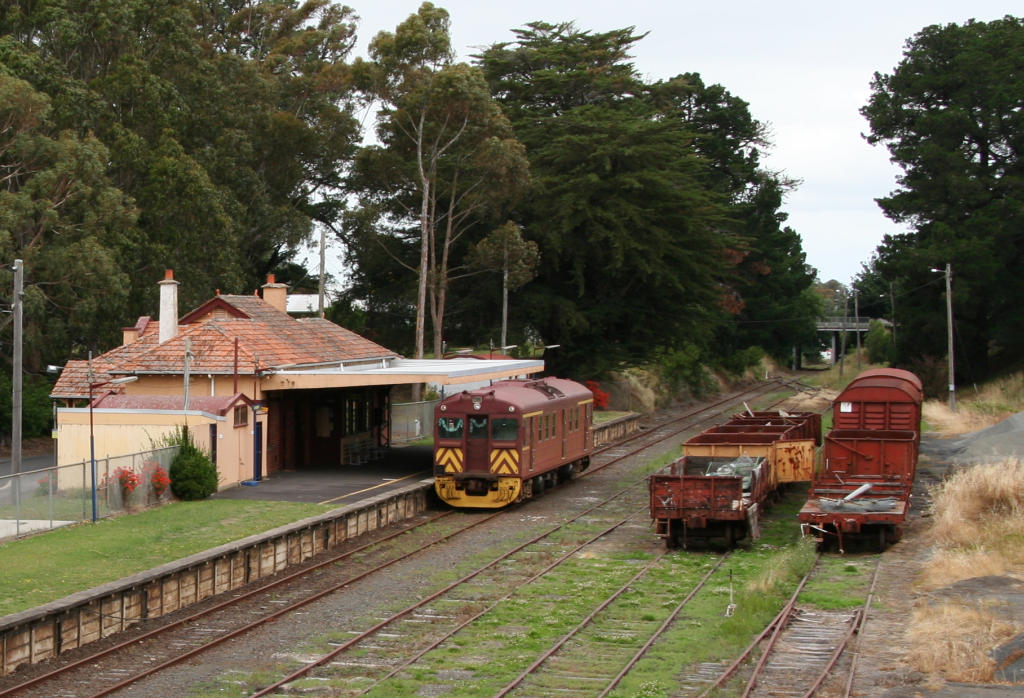
Red Hen rail car at Leongatha station

Several lines were promised for reopening in the early 2000s as part of the Linking Victoria program, however 2 projects were not completed.

The most commonly proposed services are:

=== Mildura line ===
Originally withdrawn on 12 September 1993. Once served by The Vinelander service, the line branches from the Serviceton line at Ballarat. V/Line passenger trains currently operate to Maryborough.

- **Ballarat**
- Creswick
- Clunes
- Maryborough
- Dunolly
- St Arnaud
- Donald
- Birchip
- Ouyen
- Red Cliffs
- Irymple railway station
- **Mildura**

=== Horsham line ===
Originally withdrawn on 21 August 1993 to Dimboola; however, Journey Beyond's Melbourne to Adelaide Overland trains operate twice a week. The current Broad Gauge V/Line passenger rail services terminates at Ararat.

- Ararat
- Stawell
- Murtoa
- **Horsham**
- Dimboola

=== Leongatha line ===
Originally withdrawn on 24 July 1993; however, the Dandenong to Cranbourne section was retained and became part of the Melbourne Suburban rail network in 1995.

- Tooradin
- Koo Wee Rup
- Lang Lang
- Nyora
- Loch
- Korumburra
- **Leongatha**

=== Geelong-Ballarat-Bendigo Rail Link ===
The Geelong-Ballarat-Bendigo Rail Link is a proposed railway project that would link Victoria's three largest regional cities and provide rail access to the towns of Bannockburn, Lethbridge, Meredith, Lal Lal, Carisbrook, Newstead, Harcourt, and Golden Square. A study was commissioned in 2012 regarding this proposal.

- Geelong
- Bannockburn
- Lethbridge
- Meredith
- Lal Lal
- Ballarat
- Creswick
- Clunes
- Talbot
- Maryborough
- Carisbrook
- Newstead
- Castlemaine
- Harcourt
- Kangaroo Flat
- Golden Square
- Bendigo

== See also ==
- List of closed railway stations in Victoria
- List of Metro Trains Melbourne railway stations
