= Cope Cope railway station =

Railway station in Victoria, Australia

Cope Cope

General information
- Location: Cope Cope, Victoria, Australia; Australia
- Line: Mildura railway line
- Platforms: 0, formerly 1

Other information
- Status: Demolished

History
- Opened: 1882
- Closed: 1987

Services
Preceding station	Disused railways	Following station
Swanwater	Mildura line	Donald
	List of closed railway stations in Victoria	

Cope Cope railway station was a railway station on the Mildura railway line located in the small town of Cope Cope, Victoria. It opened in 1882 when the line was extended from St Arnaud to Donald. It closed to passengers in 1987 due to extremely low passenger demand.

== Read also ==
- Cope Cope
- Mildura railway station
- Yelta railway station
- Avoca railway line
