= Creswick railway station =

Railway station in Victoria, Australia

Creswick
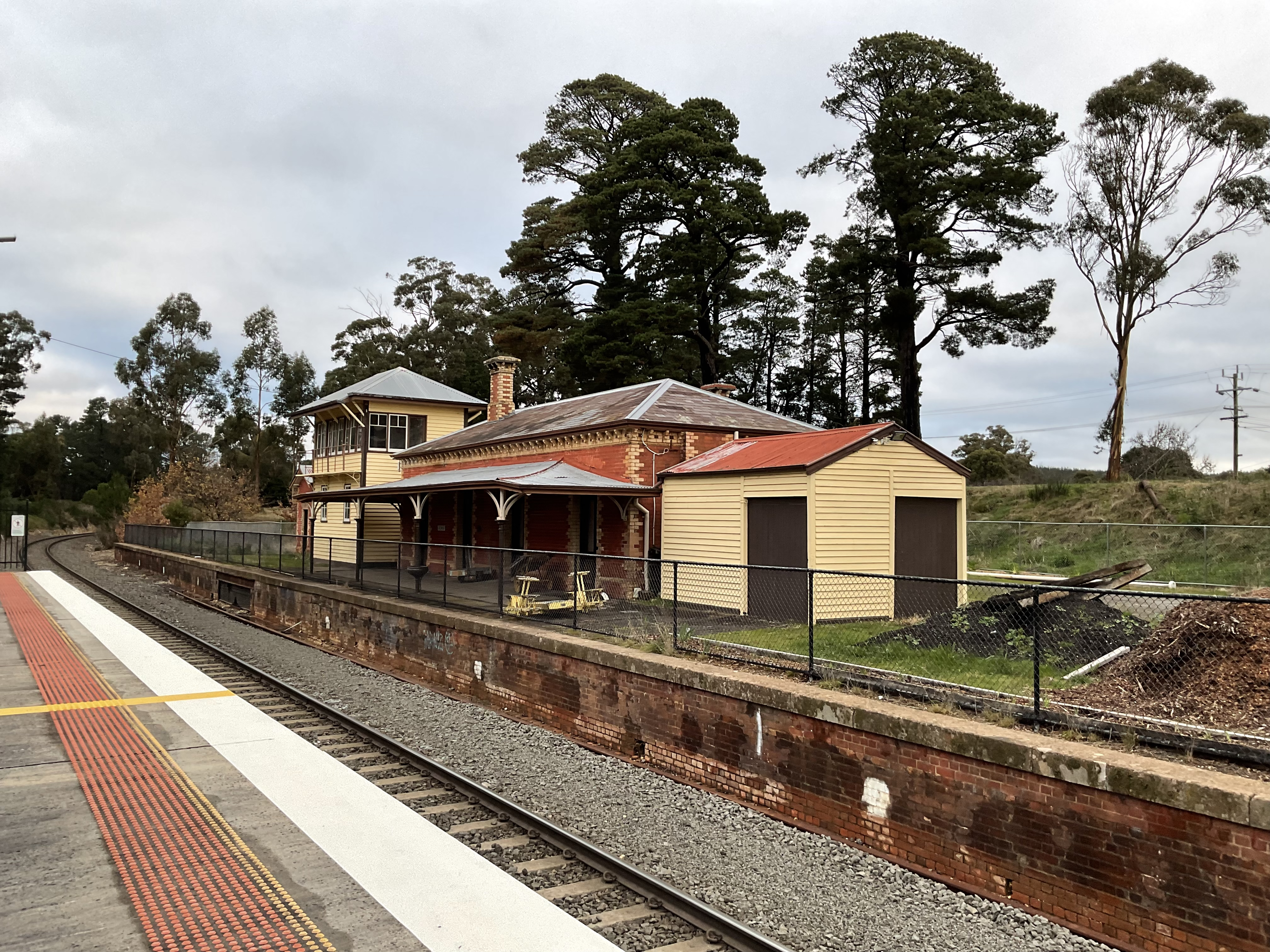
- Southbound view from the station platform, showing the former station platform and building, June 2023

General information
- Location: Lewers Street, Creswick, Victoria 3363; Shire of Hepburn; Australia
- Coordinates: 37°25′26″S 143°53′17″E
- System: PTV regional rail station
- Owner: VicTrack
- Operator: V/Line
- Line: Maryborough (Mildura)
- Distance: 174.48 kilometres from Southern Cross
- Platforms: 1
- Tracks: 1
- Connections: Bus; Coach

Construction
- Structure type: At-grade
- Parking: Yes
- Cycle facilities: Yes
- Accessible: Yes

Other information
- Status: Operational, unstaffed
- Station code: CWK
- Fare zone: Myki zone 9/10
- Website: Public Transport Victoria

History
- Opened: 7 July 1874; 152 years ago

Key dates
- 7 July 1874: Opened
- 12 September 1993: Closed
- 25 July 2010: Reopened

Services
Preceding station	V/Line	Following station
Ballarat Terminus	Maryborough line	Clunes towards Maryborough
Ballarat towards Southern Cross	Maryborough line One daily service	Clunes One-way operation
Location
- Location within Victoria

Creswick railway station is a regional railway station on the Mildura line, part of the Victorian railway network. It serves the town of Creswick, in Victoria, Australia. Creswick station is a ground level unstaffed station, featuring one side platform. It opened on 7 July 1874, with the current station provided in 2010. It initially closed on 12 September 1993, then reopened on 25 July 2010.

== History ==
The station closed on 12 September 1993, after The Vinelander service to Mildura was withdrawn and replaced by road coaches. A new platform, inaugurated on 25 July 2010, was constructed to cater for the restoration of passenger services from Ballarat to Maryborough.

When the return of passenger services was announced, the State Government said that the cost of repairing the station building and upgrading the old platform for wheelchair access was too high, so the new platform was provided. In 2010, local residents proposed that the disused station building be developed into a community hub, with the support of the Hepburn Shire Council and VicTrack.

The new platform is on the eastern side of the line, with a steel shelter provided for waiting passengers. The former station building, platform and signal box are on the western side of the line, with a pedestrian subway passing underneath the tracks at the southern (up) end. The original station building is listed on the Victorian Heritage Register. There is a goods shed on the site, but no tracks are connected to it.

The junction for a branch line to Daylesford was approximately 1.6 kilometres north of Creswick, at the former North Creswick station. That branch was constructed in the 1880s and operated until 1952, when it was cut back to Newlyn. It was further truncated to Allendale in 1976, and closed completely in 1985.

In 1988, Creswick was disestablished as an electric staff station, and all signals, points and interlocking were abolished, along with the signal box.

== Platforms and services ==
Creswick has one platform. It is served by V/Line Maryborough line trains.

Creswick platform arrangement
Platform	Line	Destination
1	Maryborough line	Ballarat, Southern Cross, Maryborough

== Transport links ==
CDC Ballarat operates one bus route via Creswick station, under contract to Public Transport Victoria:

- 30 : Ballarat station – Creswick

V/Line operates road coach services from Ballarat to Donald via Creswick station.

== Gallery ==
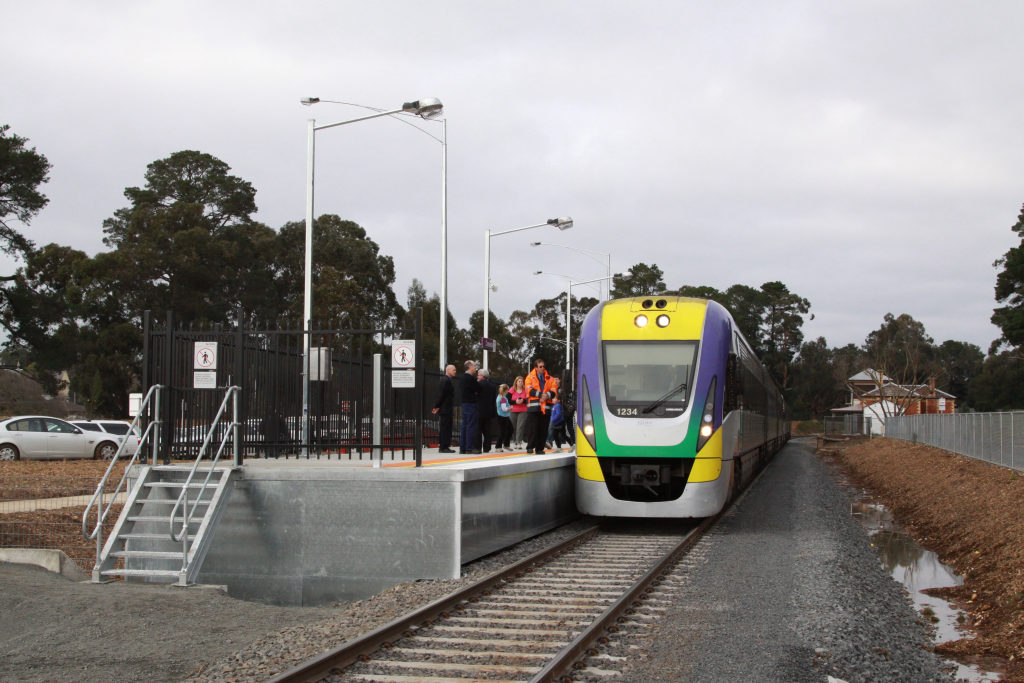
Southbound view of the platform with a VLocity train stationary at the platform on opening day,
July 2010

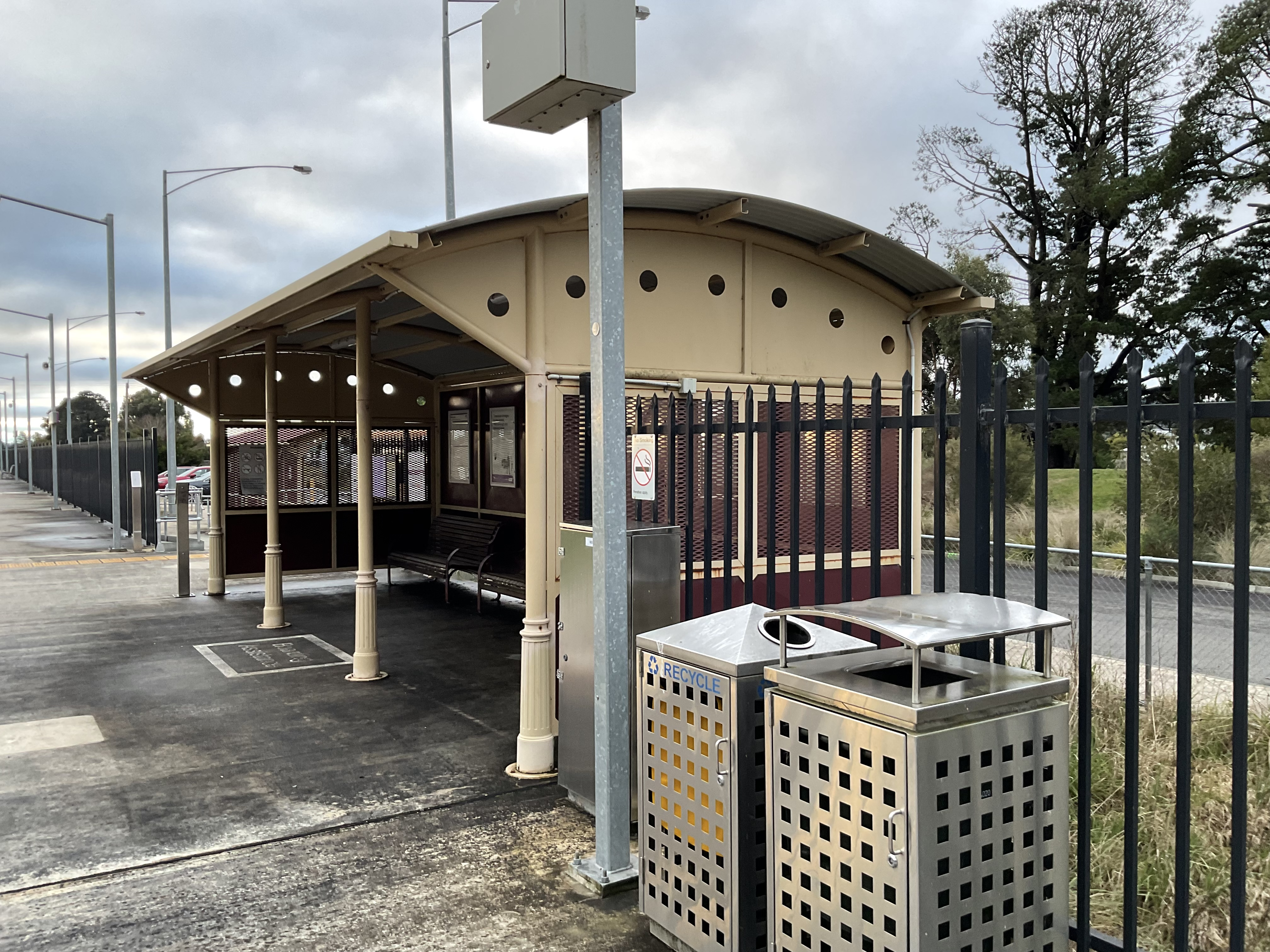
Northbound view from the station platform, showing the shelter on new platform, June 2023
