= Donald Station =

Donald Station may refer to:

- Donald, British Columbia, a ghost town
- Donald railway station, Victoria, a closed railway station on the Mildura railway line in Donald, Victoria, Australia
