= Talbot railway station =

Railway station in Victoria, Australia

Talbot
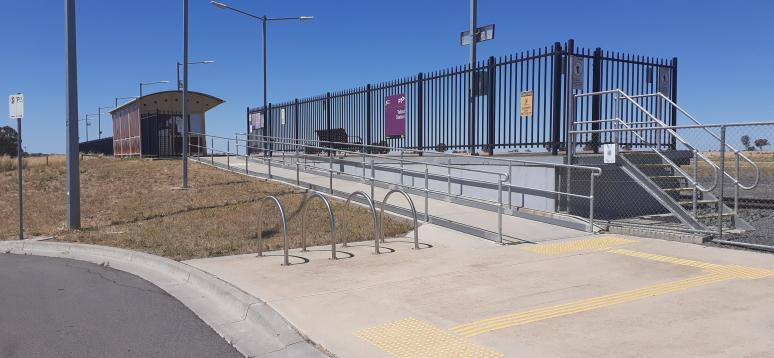
- Station forecourt and entrance, December 2021

General information
- Location: Railway Street, Talbot, Victoria 3371; Shire of Central Goldfields; Australia
- Coordinates: 37°10′18″S 143°42′22″E
- System: PTV regional rail station
- Owner: VicTrack
- Operator: V/Line
- Line: Maryborough (Mildura)
- Distance: 209.87 kilometres from Southern Cross
- Platforms: 1 side platform
- Tracks: 1
- Connections: Coach

Construction
- Structure type: At-grade
- Parking: Yes
- Cycle facilities: Yes
- Accessible: Yes

Other information
- Status: Operational, unstaffed
- Station code: TAT
- Fare zone: Myki zone 13/14
- Website: Public Transport Victoria

History
- Opened: 2 February 1875; 151 years ago

Key dates
- 2 February 1875: Opened
- 12 September 1993: Closed
- 22 December 2013: Reopened

Services
Preceding station	V/Line	Following station
Clunes towards Ballarat	Maryborough line	Maryborough Terminus
Clunes towards Southern Cross	Maryborough line One daily service	Maryborough One-way operation
Location
- Location within Victoria

Talbot railway station is a regional railway station on the Mildura line, part of the Victorian railway network. It serves the town of Talbot, in Victoria, Australia. It was opened on 2 February 1875 and was closed on 12 September 1993. It reopened on 22 December 2013, when the current station was provided.

The station closed on 12 September 1993, after The Vinelander service to Mildura was withdrawn and replaced by road coaches. The station was not reopened when rail passenger services from Ballarat to Maryborough resumed in July 2010. In February 2010, the crossing loop and siding were abolished.

In November 2010, the Liberal/National Coalition said the station would be reopened if it won the forthcoming 2010 state election. The subsequent Coalition government reopened Talbot on 22 December 2013. A new platform and shelter had to be built because the original station building had been leased for use as a nursery and railway museum.

In 2016-2017, the station was one of the least-patronised in Victoria, with annual passenger movements of 1,121, or about 3.07 passengers a day. In 2020-2021, the station recorded the second-lowest patronage in the state, with 350 passenger movements - less than one passenger a day.

== Platforms and services ==
Talbot has one platform and is served by V/Line Maryborough line trains.

Talbot platform arrangement
Platform	Line	Destination
1	Maryborough line	Ballarat, Southern Cross, Maryborough

== Transport links ==
V/Line operates road coach services via Talbot station, from Melbourne and Ballarat to Donald and Mildura.

== Gallery ==
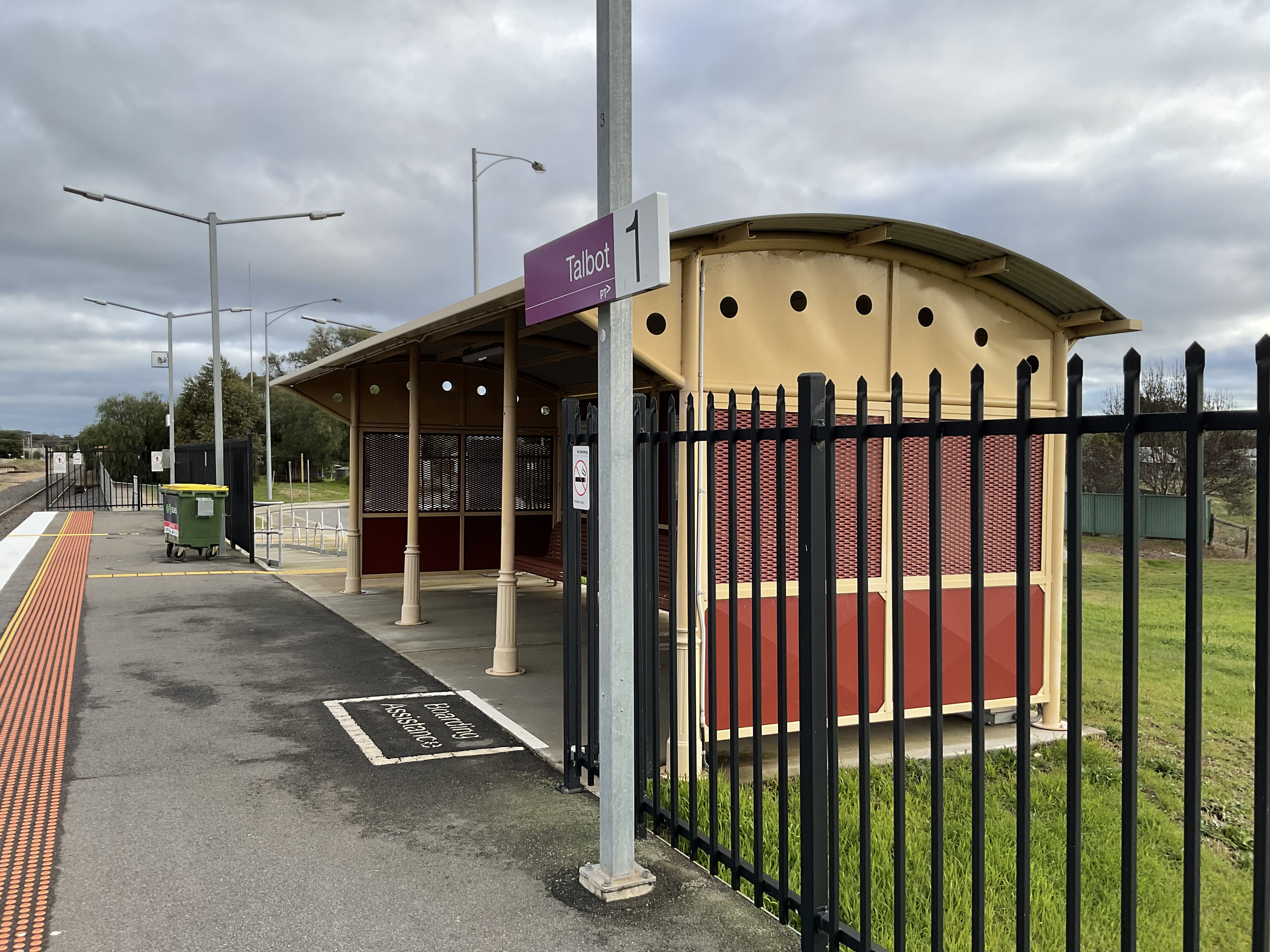
Platform shelter on new platform, looking south, June 2023

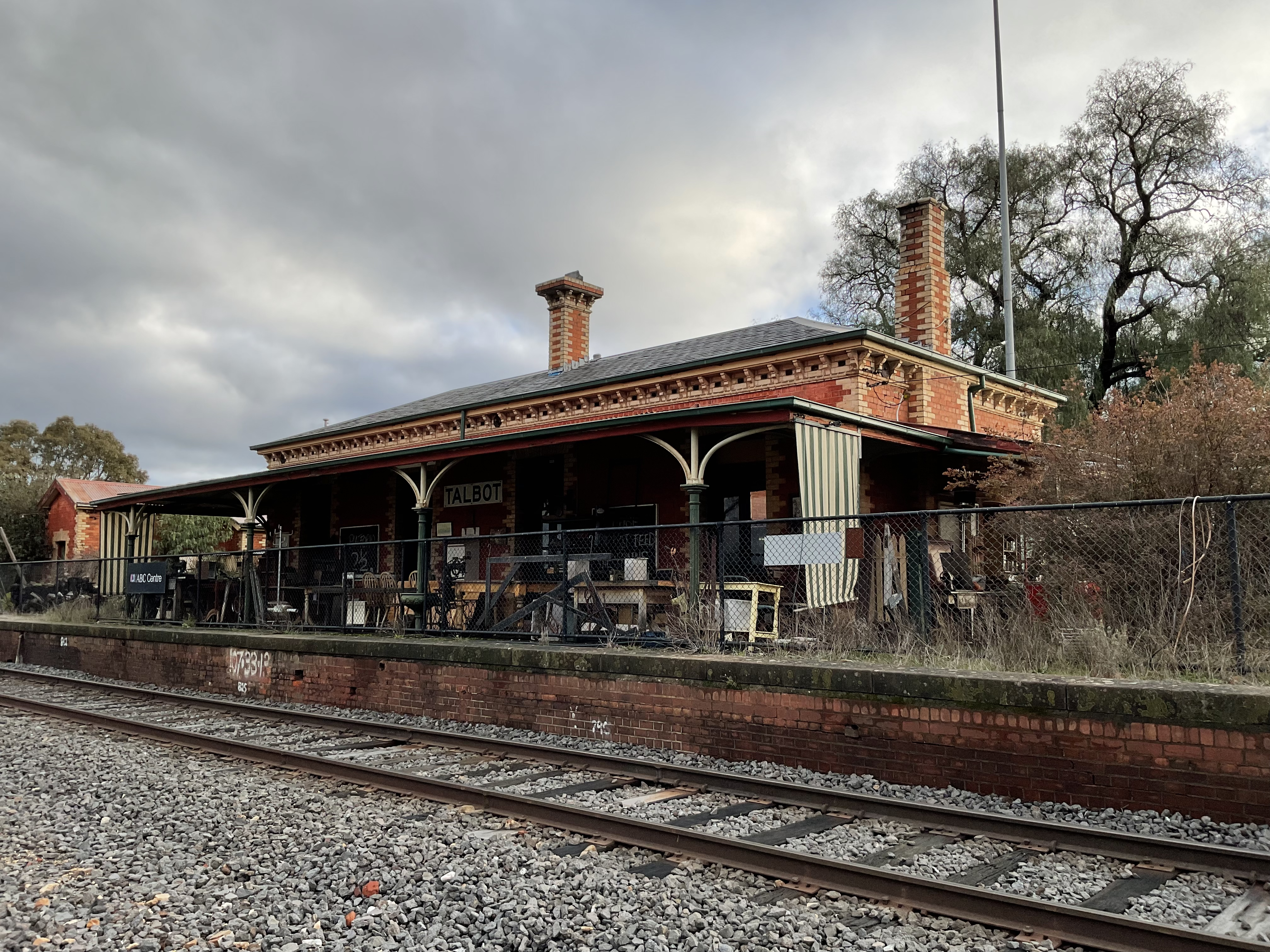
The former station building and platform, looking south, June 2023
