= Clunes railway station, Victoria =

Railway station in Victoria, Australia

Clunes
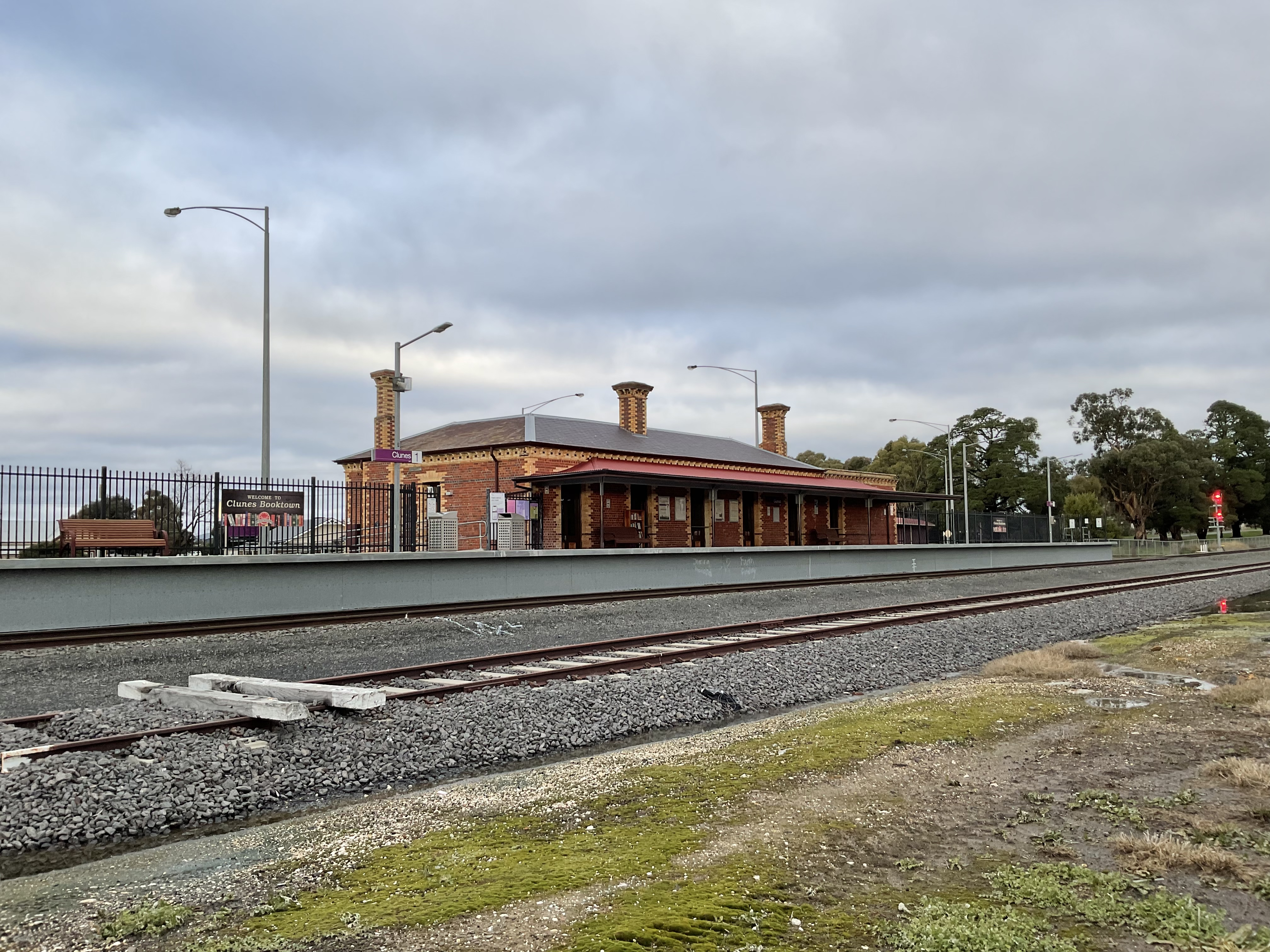
- Southbound view of the station platform and building, June 2023

General information
- Location: Service Street, Clunes, Victoria 3370; Shire of Hepburn; Australia
- Coordinates: 37°10′52″S 143°27′55″E
- System: PTV regional rail station
- Owner: VicTrack
- Operator: V/Line
- Line: Maryborough (Mildura)
- Distance: 192.55 kilometres from Southern Cross
- Platforms: 1
- Tracks: 2
- Connections: Coach

Construction
- Structure type: At-grade
- Parking: Yes
- Cycle facilities: Yes
- Accessible: Yes

Other information
- Status: Operational, unstaffed
- Station code: CLU
- Fare zone: Myki zone 11/12
- Website: Public Transport Victoria

History
- Opened: 16 November 1874; 151 years ago

Key dates
- 16 November 1874: Opened
- 12 September 1993: Closed
- 3 December 2011: Reopened

Services
Preceding station	V/Line	Following station
Creswick towards Ballarat	Maryborough line	Talbot towards Maryborough
Creswick towards Southern Cross	Maryborough line One daily service	Talbot One-way operation
Location
- Location within Victoria

Clunes railway station is a regional railway station on the Mildura line, part of the Victorian railway network. It serves the town of Clunes, in Victoria, Australia. Clunes station is a ground level unstaffed station, featuring one side platform. It opened on 16 November 1874, with the current station provided in 2011. It initially closed on 12 September 1993, then reopened on 3 December 2011.

== History ==
The station closed on 12 September 1993, when The Vinelander service to Mildura was withdrawn and replaced by road coaches. It was reinstated on 3 December 2011, as an additional station on the reopened passenger service to Maryborough.

The station, along with parts of the main street, were famously used in the 1979 film Mad Max, when the bikie crew pick up the Nightrider's coffin.

In 1987, Clunes was abolished as an electric staff station, with the signal box, interlocking and signals abolished. In March 2010, a new 140-metre siding was provided opposite the platform, to stable track machines.

When rail passenger services to Maryborough resumed in July 2010, Clunes station was not reopened, but in June 2010, it was announced that it would be. On 3 December 2011, a ceremony was held to officially reopen the station, and regular services began stopping there the following day.

Prior to the reopening, contractors working on the station removed the original cast iron veranda, which was sent for scrap, outraging local residents and the local council. By mid-2012, a replacement veranda had been rebuilt.

During 2015, the former station building was refurbished, and was leased out for community use in the same year.

== Platforms and services ==
Clunes has one platform. It is served by V/Line Maryborough line trains.

Clunes platform arrangement
Platform	Line	Destination
1	Maryborough line	Ballarat, Southern Cross, Maryborough

== Transport links ==
V/Line operates road coach services via Clunes station, from Ballarat to Donald and Mildura.

== Gallery ==
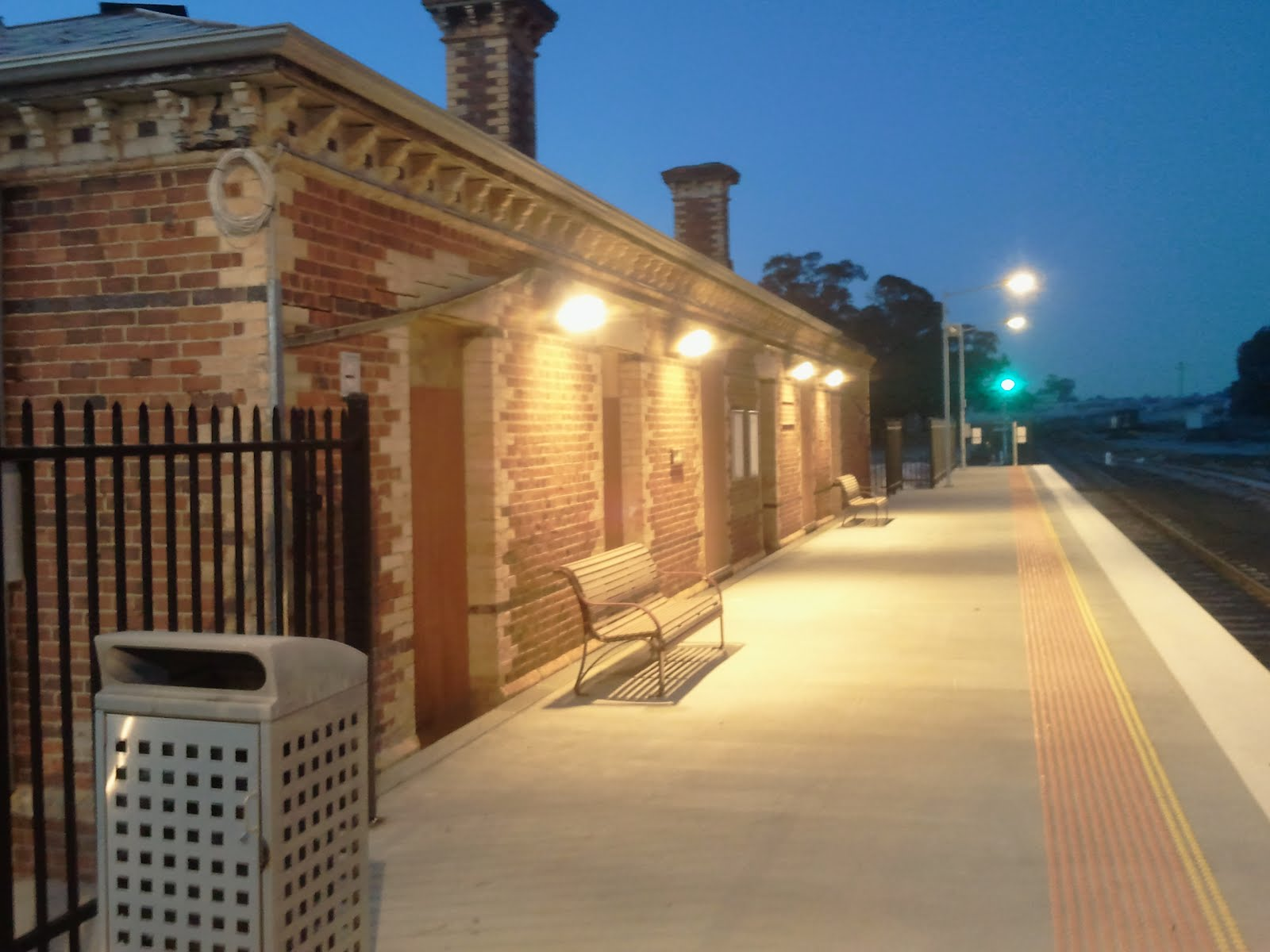
Southbound view from the station platform prior to the replacement verandah being provided, July 2012
