= CWK =

CWK may refer to:

- Cold War Kids, an American indie rock band from Long Beach, California
- Creswick railway station, Australia
- .cwk, a file extension of AppleWorks (ClarisWorks) files
