= Maryborough railway station, Victoria =

Railway station in Victoria, Australia

Maryborough
- Station building, 2026

General information
- Location: Victoria Street, Maryborough, Victoria 3465; Shire of Central Goldfields; Australia
- Coordinates: 37°03′04″S 143°44′33″E
- System: PTV regional rail station
- Owner: VicTrack
- Operator: V/Line
- Lines: Maryborough (Mildura)
- Distance: 182.48 kilometrers from Southern Cross via Ballarat 180.137 kilometrers from Southern Cross via Castlemaine 224.04 kilometres from Geelong 352.983 kilometers from Southern Cross via Ararat
- Platforms: 1 (Formerly 3)
- Tracks: 4
- Train operators: V/Line
- Connections: Bus; Coach

Construction
- Structure type: At-grade
- Parking: Yes
- Cycle facilities: Yes
- Accessible: Yes

Other information
- Status: Operational, staffed part-time
- Station code: MBY
- Fare zone: Myki zone 14
- Website: Public Transport Victoria

History
- Opened: 7 July 1874; 152 years ago

Key dates
- 7 July 1874: Opened
- 12 September 1993: Closed
- 2006–2007: $1.9 million restoration
- 25 July 2010: Reopened

Passengers
- 2013–2014: 9,172
- 2014–2015: 9,431 ▲2.82%
- 2015–2016: 7,571 ▼19.72%
- 2016–2017: 8,360 ▲10.42%
- 2017–2018: Not measured
- 2018–2019: 9,350 ▲11.84%
- 2019–2020: 7,550 ▼19.25%
- 2020–2021: 3,600 ▼52.31%
- 2021–2022: 4,900 ▲36.11%
- 2022–2023: 6,400 ▲30.61%
- 2023–2024: 9,450 ▲47.66%
- 2024–2025: 10,650 ▲12.7%

Services
Preceding station	V/Line	Following station
Talbot towards Ballarat	Maryborough line	Terminus
Talbot towards Southern Cross	Maryborough line One daily service	Terminus
Former services
Preceding station	V/Line	Following station
Talbot towards Spencer Street	Mildura line Vinelander	Dunolly towards Mildura
Former lines
Preceding station	Disused railways	Following station
Terminus	Moolort line	Carisbrook
Homebush	Avoca line	Terminus

Victorian Heritage Register
- Official name: Maryborough Railway Station
- Designated: 20 August 1982
- Reference no.: H1577
Location
- Location within Victoria

Maryborough railway station is a regional railway station on the Mildura line, part of the Victorian railway network. It serves the town of Maryborough, in Victoria, Australia. Maryborough is a ground level premium station, featuring one side platform. It opened on 7 July 1874, with the current station provided in 2010. It was initially closed on 12 September 1993, then reopened on 25 July 2010 with the reintroduction of V/Line passenger services to the station.

Maryborough is a major junction, with cross country routes to Moolort and Ararat. The Avoca line from Ararat is a standard gauge line that becomes a dual gauge track when passing through Maryborough, with the dual gauge track operating as far north as Dunolly. There are the remains of dock platforms at both ends of the main platform.

== History ==
Maryborough station opened on 7 July 1874, when a railway line from Castlemaine was provided. On 6 October of that year, the line was extended to Dunolly and, on 2 February 1875, the line from Clunes was extended. Like the town itself, the station was named after Maryborough in Ireland, which was suggested by James Daly, who was Assistant Gold Commissioner.

The current station building was erected in 1890, with 25 rooms and a clock tower, of red brick with stucco trimming. In 1895, Mark Twain visited Maryborough, which he dryly observed as being: "A railway station with a town attached". Some people believe bureaucratic error led to the station being built from plans for the station intended for Maryborough, Queensland (a much larger town), and others from Melbourne's Spencer Street station (now Southern Cross), as it was a much larger station than Spencer Street, in the state's capital city.

The station clock was provided in the clocktower in 1914.

In 1967, a rail overpass replaced a level crossing at Tuaggra Street (Pyrenees Highway), located in the down direction of the station. In 1969, boom barriers replaced interlocked gates at the Inkerman Street level crossing, located nearby in the up direction of the station.

In 1988, track "A" and siding "C" was abolished, as well as a number of signal posts. A number of signals and crossovers were provided at the same time.

On 12 September 1993, the station was closed to passenger traffic, when The Vinelander service to Mildura was withdrawn and replaced by road coaches.

During 2006–2007, the station was restored by RBA Architects and Conservation Consultants, with repairs to the towers, clock, facade, portico, roof and guttering. Stage Two included slating, rendering, glazing and moulding repairs, to match the works conducted during the first stage of works.

In December 2008, as part of the Victorian Transport Plan, the State Government announced passenger rail services to Maryborough would resume. On 25 July 2010, services between Maryborough and Ballarat commenced.

In 2011, restoration works occurred on the station platform verandah.

During the 2026 Victorian state election campaign, the Victorian Labor government committed to adding a third daily train to Maryborough, and the Victorian Liberals and Nationals committed to introducing a new V/Line passenger rail shuttle to connect Mildura, Red Cliffs, Ouyen, Birchip, Donald, St Arnaud and Dunolly to Melbourne bound trains at Maryborough.

== Platforms and services ==
Maryborough has one platform. It is serviced by V/Line Maryborough line services. It has two former platforms on the other side of the main platform that was closed between 1970s-1990s.

Maryborough platform arrangement
Platform	Line	Destination
1	Maryborough line	Ballarat, Southern Cross

== Transport links ==
Maryborough Transit (Whitmore Group) operates three routes via Maryborough station, under contract to Public Transport Victoria:

- 1 : Maryborough (Napier Street) – Hedges
- 2 : Maryborough (Napier Street) – Princes Park/Whirrakee
- 3 : Maryborough (Napier Street) – Pascoe

V/Line operates road coaches via Maryborough station, from Melbourne and Ballarat to Donald and Mildura.

== Gallery ==
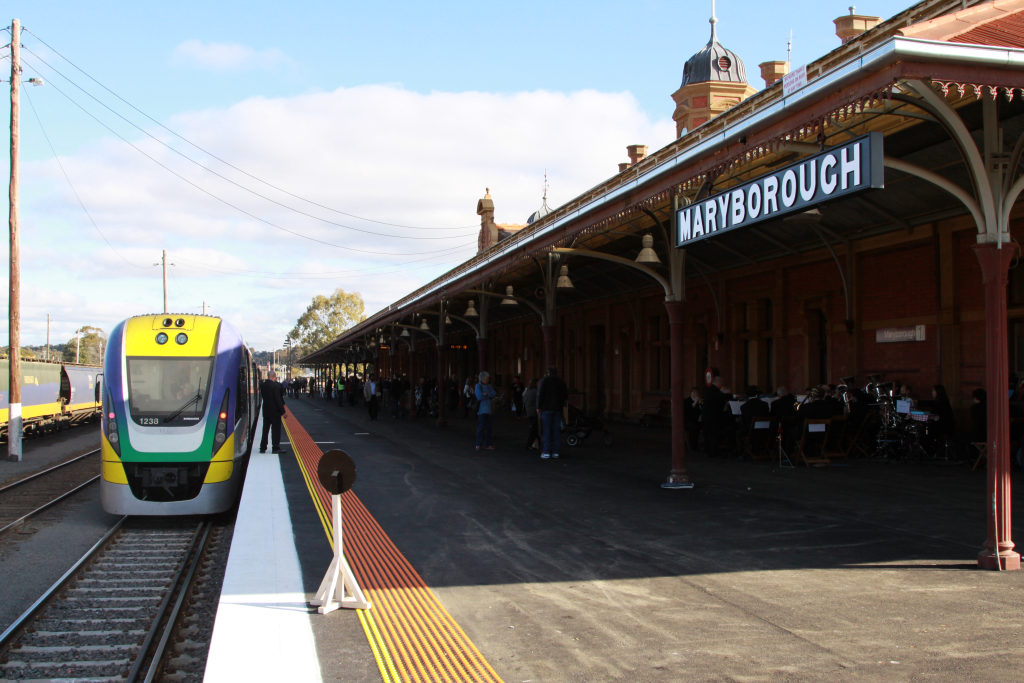
Southbound view, with VLocity set VL38 on Platform 1, July 2010
