= Dunolly railway station =

Former railway station in Victoria, Australia

Dunolly
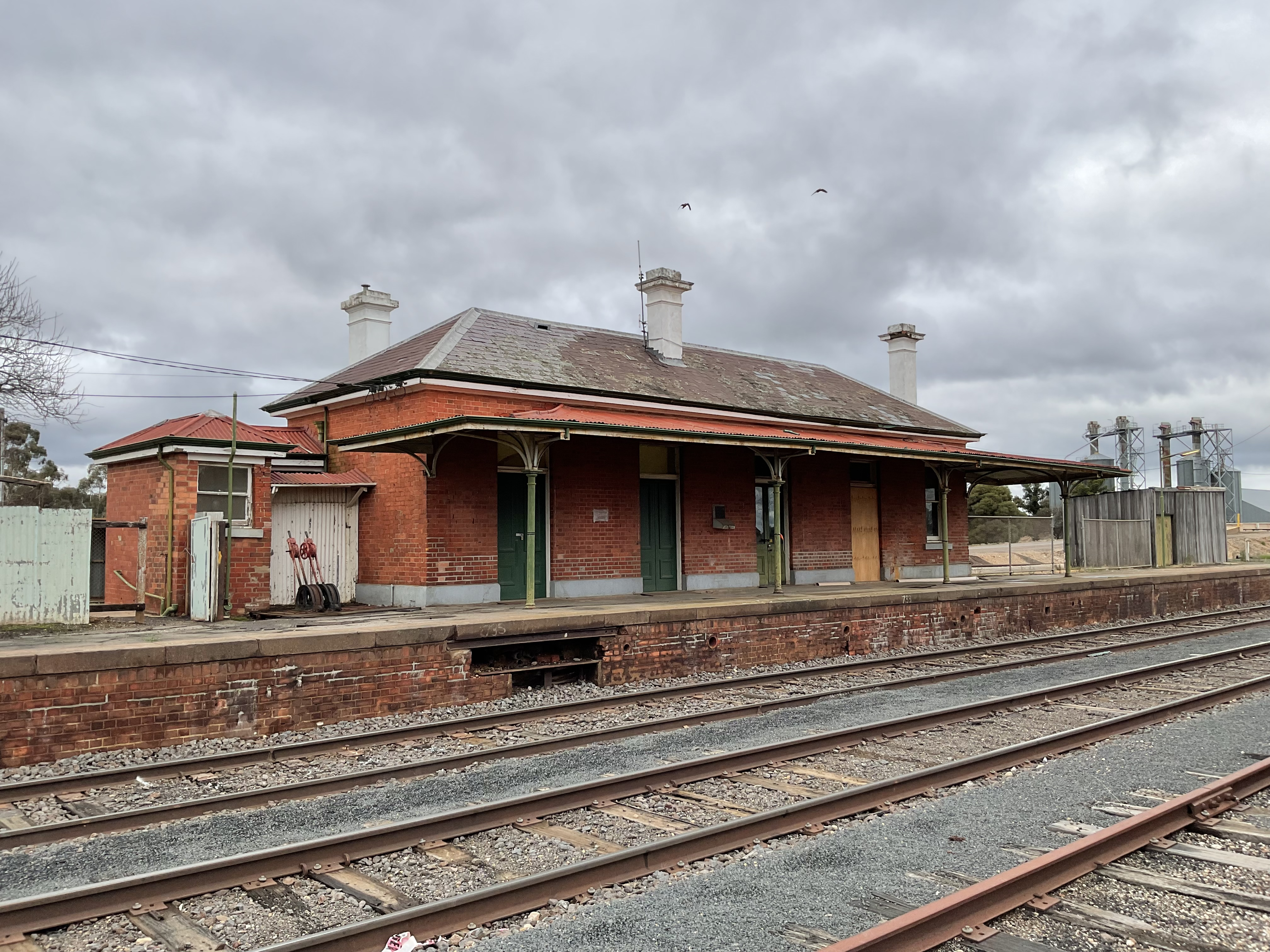
- Southbound view of the station in June 2023

General information
- Coordinates: 36°51′49″S 143°43′46″E
- Lines: Mildura, Robinvale
- Platforms: 1
- Tracks: 3

Other information
- Status: Closed

History
- Opened: 1874
- Closed: 4 October 1981; 12 September 1993 (Vinelander)

Services
Preceding station	V/Line	Following station
Maryborough towards Spencer Street	Mildura line Vinelander	St Arnaud towards Mildura
Former services
Preceding station	Disused railways	Following station
Junction	Robinvale line	Inglewood
Location
- Location within Victoria

Dunolly is a closed railway station on the Mildura line in the town of Dunolly, Victoria, Australia. The station was one of 35 closed to passenger traffic on 4 October 1981 as part of the New Deal timetable for country passengers. Today it is the junction for the lines towards Inglewood, Kulwin, and Robinvale. It also contains grain silos.

The railway from Castlemaine, via Maryborough, reached Dunolly on 6 October 1874. A connection between Maryborough and Ballarat was made on 2 February 1875.

On the 19th of October 2026, the Victorian Liberals and Nationals committed to restoring V/Line passenger rail service to Dunolly by 2029 if they won the November 2026 Victorian state election.
