= Linking Victoria =

The Linking Victoria was a state government program launched in 1999 by the premier, Steve Bracks, to upgrade transport infrastructure in Victoria, Australia. If implemented, the estimate cost of the program would have been $3.5 billion, including improvements to road, rail and port networks.

== Elements ==
Elements of the program included:

- an airport rail link from Melbourne Airport into central Melbourne. Funds were committed in 2017/18 by State and Federal governments for preparation of a business case.
- Regional Fast Rail project upgrading passenger rail links in regional Victoria, completed in 2009.
- reinstating country passenger rail services, including those to Bairnsdale, Ararat, Leongatha and Mildura. The latter two projects were deferred and ultimately cancelled.
- Geelong Freeway upgrade.
- standardisation of railway gauges (deferred, and partially restarted in 2008).
- Eastern Freeway extension to Ringwood. Completed in 2008.
- duplication of the Calder Highway to Bendigo. Completed on 20 April 2009.
- accident blackspot road safety program.
- development of the Port of Melbourne, constructing the Dock Link Road, investigating reinstatement of the Webb Dock railway line.
- joint private/public sector major redevelopment of Spencer Street station.

== See also ==
- List of Victoria Government Infrastructure Plans, Proposals and Studies
