= Irymple railway station =

Former railway station in Australia

Coordinates: 34°14′24.6″S 142°10′19.1″E

Irymple
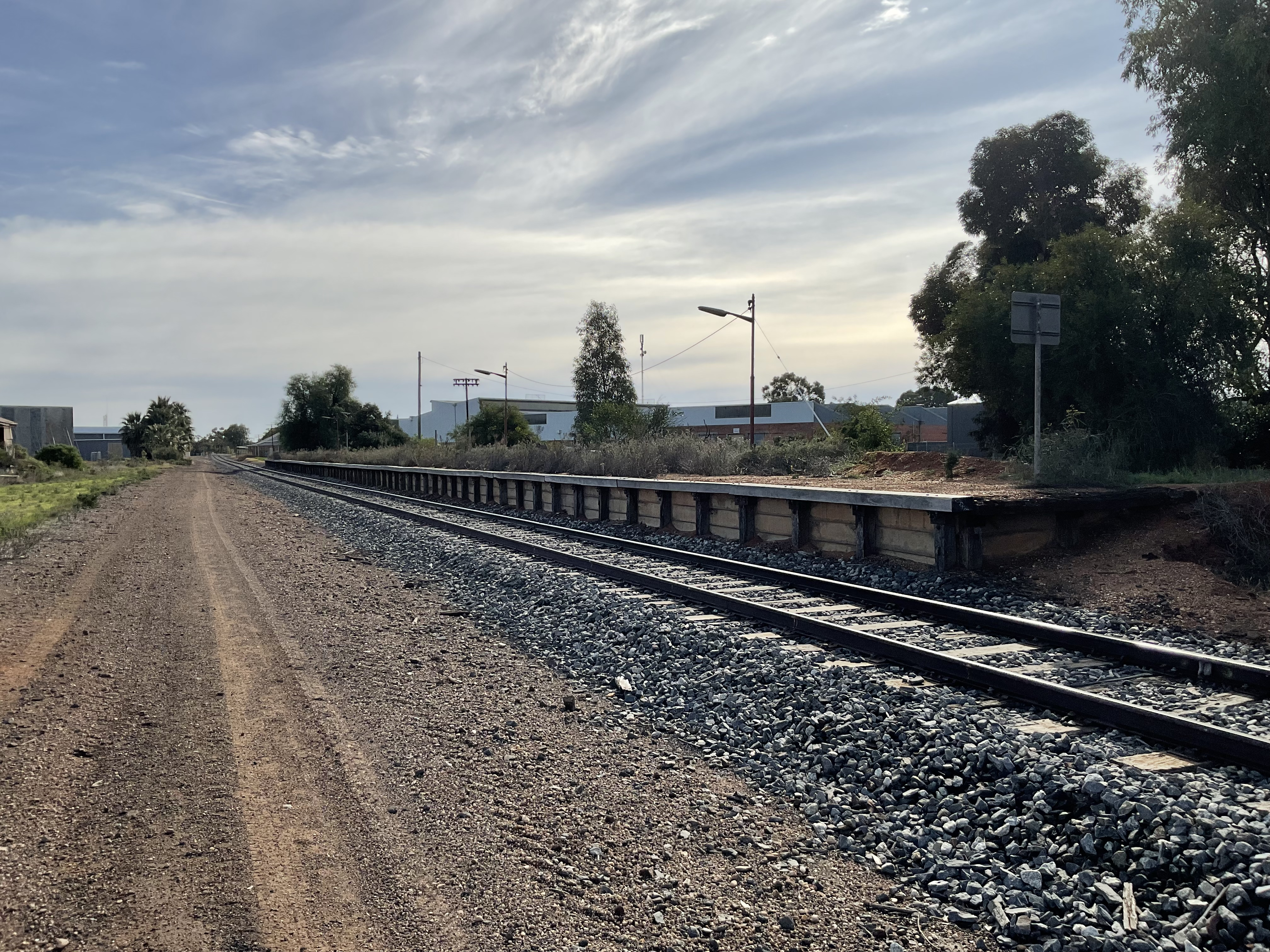
- Northbound view of the station in June 2023

General information
- Location: Australia
- Owner: VicTrack
- Line: Mildura
- Platforms: 1
- Tracks: 1

Other information
- Status: Closed

History
- Opened: October 1903
- Closed: 12 September 1993

Services
| Preceding station | Disused railways | Following station |
|---|---|---|
| Red Cliffs | Mildura line | Mildura |
| | List of closed railway stations in Victoria | |
Location

Irymple railway station is a closed railway station in Irymple, on the Mildura railway line, in Victoria, Australia. It was opened in October 1903 when the railway was extended from Ouyen to Mildura and was closed when passenger services to Mildura were withdrawn in September 1993.

By 1904, a telegraph instrument and goods shed were provided. In 1911, the station building was destroyed by fire. In 1982, the stationmasters office, platforms and remaining facilities were placed on the Victorian Heritage Register.

In 2002, the station building was relocated to the Red Cliffs Historical Steam Railway, who currently use it as a terminus for their narrow gauge tourist railway located along a small section of the former Morkalla line. The station platform still remains intact at the site of Irymple, along with the goods shed.

== Gallery ==
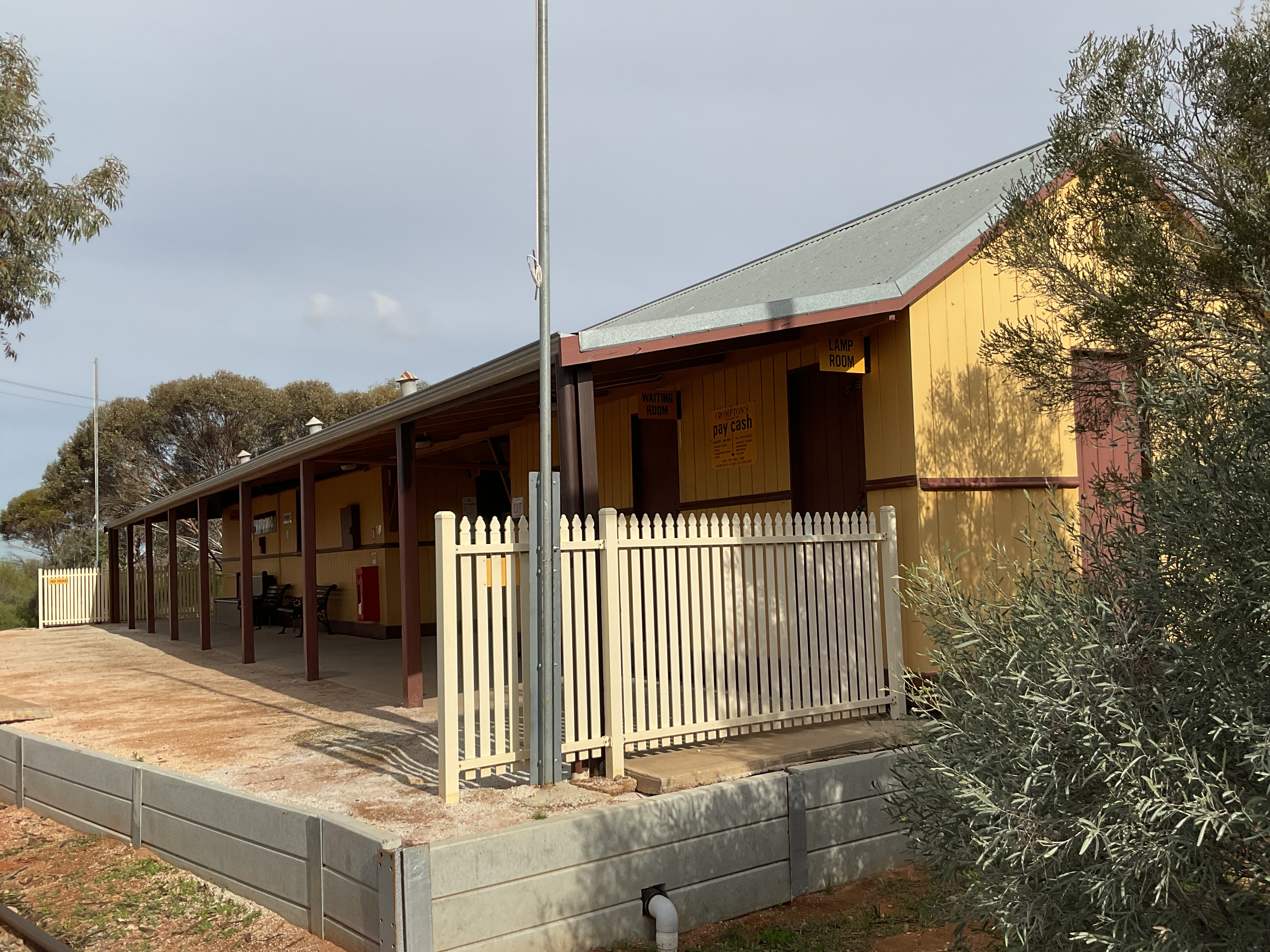
The ex-Irymple station building at its present location as the “Karadoc” terminus of the Red Cliffs Historical Steam Railway in June 2023.

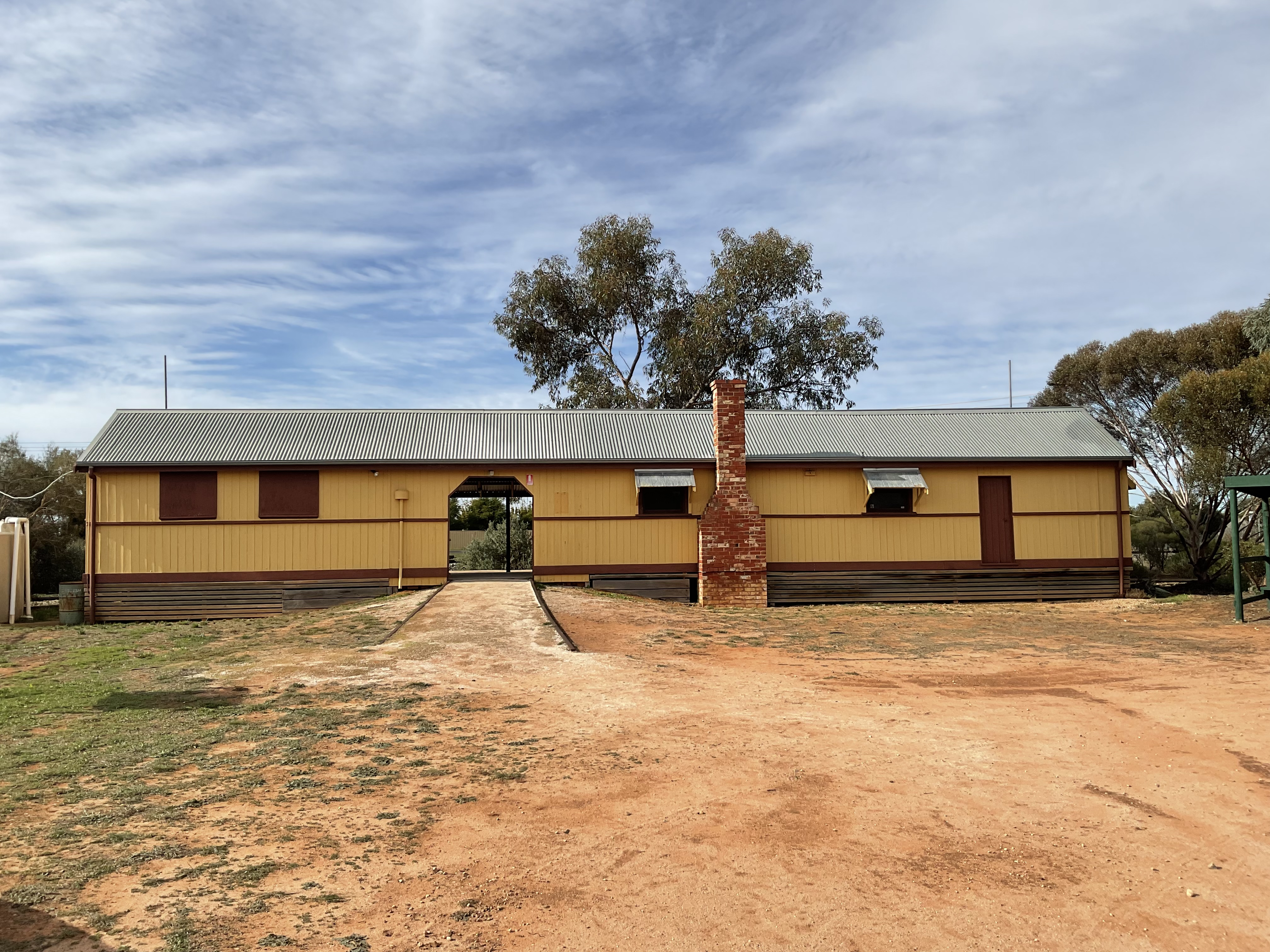
Station entrance at “Karadoc” (ex-Irymple) in June 2023.
