= Yelta railway station =

Former railway station in Victoria, Australia

Yelta

General information
- Coordinates: 34.1280°S 141.9938°E
- Line: Yelta
- Platforms: 0, formerly 1
- Tracks: 1 with runaround loop

Other information
- Status: Closed

History
- Opened: 1925
- Closed: September 12, 1993
Location
- Location within Victoria

Yelta was a small railway station located on the Yelta railway line, in the small township of Yelta, Victoria. It once had a medium-sized platform, which was demolished around 2004.

Early on, traffic was not sufficient to have a station master present, with sheep gates added to the passenger platform to allow for easier transport of sheep from the north in later years.

| Preceding station | Disused railways | Following station |
|---|---|---|
| Mildura | Yelta line | Terminus |
| | List of closed railway stations in Victoria | |
