= St Arnaud railway station =

Former railway station in Victoria, Australia

St Arnaud
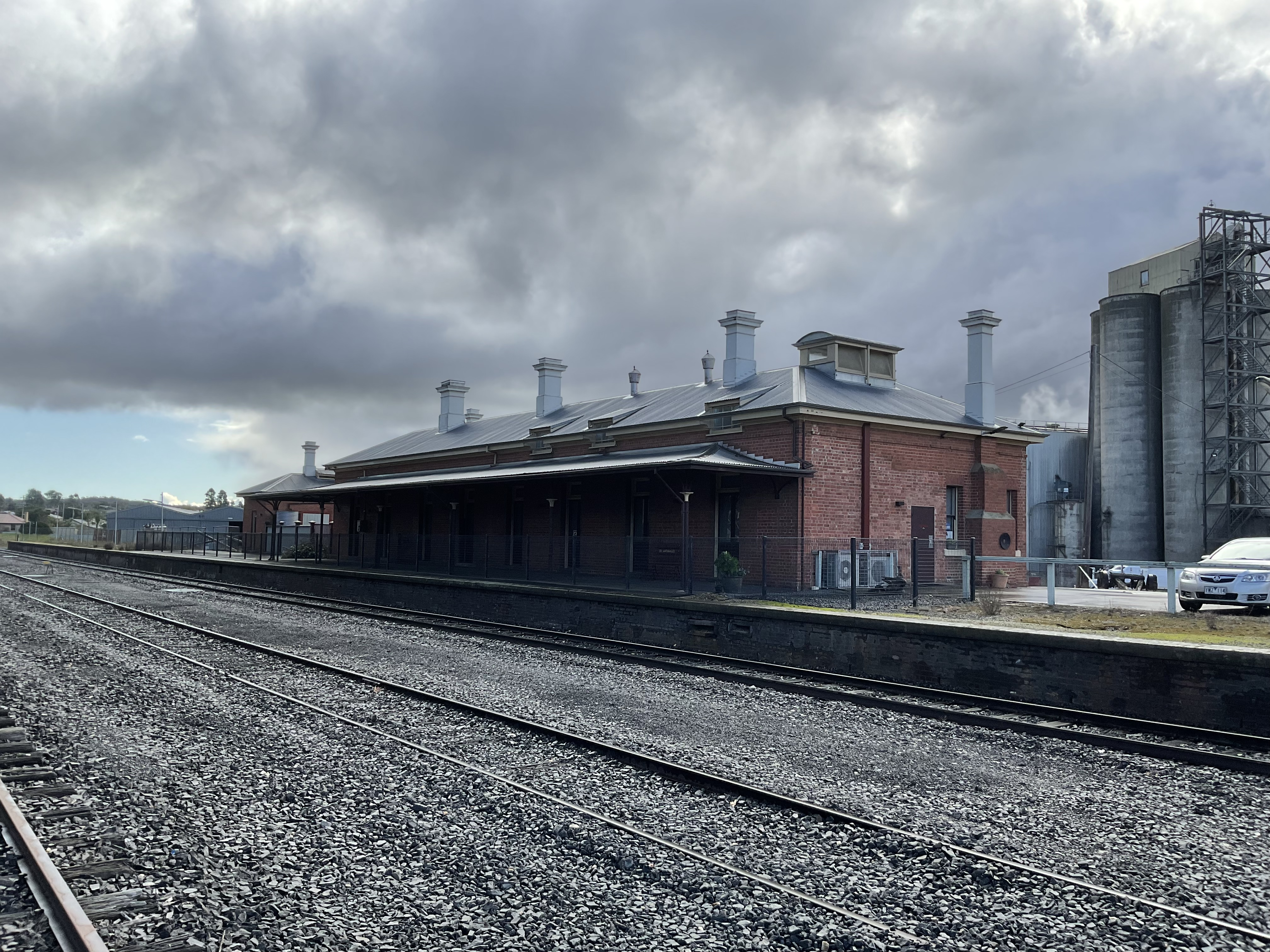
- Westbould view of the station in June 2023

General information
- Location: Queens Avenue, St Arnaud; Australia
- Coordinates: 36.62°S 143.258366°E
- Line: Mildura
- Platforms: 1
- Tracks: 1

Other information
- Status: Closed to rail services

History
- Opened: 1878
- Closed: 12 September 1993

Services
| Preceding station | Disused railways | Following station |
|---|---|---|
| Dunolly | Mildura line | Donald |
| | List of closed railway stations in Victoria | |
Location
- Location within Victoria

St Arnaud is a closed railway station on the Mildura railway line, in St Arnaud, Victoria, Australia. It is 255 km from Southern Cross station. The station contains grain silos and a number of sidings. The heritage listed building was reopened as a repurposed public Gallery and Community Hub in September, 2019.

The station was refurbished as of early 2008, owing to its heritage status, with works to include glazing the platform, and restoring the station building. A major $1M upgrade to the interior of the building and surrounds was completed in July 2019, ahead of the building reopening as a public gallery. There is speculation that passenger services may return in the future, with the reopening of the Mildura line having been promised by the state government since 1999, with major upgrades to the track ongoing as of 2008, and the restoration of services to Maryborough.

Flashing light signals were provided at the nearby Millet Street level crossing in June 1976, replacing hand-operated gates.

In September 1987, the track leading to the turntable and associated Annett locking were abolished, along with a number of points, and a signal post.

On the 19th of October 2026, the Victorian Liberals and Nationals committed to restoring V/Line passenger rail service to St Arnaud by 2029 if they won the November 2026 Victorian state election.
