= Birchip railway station =

Former railway station in Victoria, Australia

Birchip
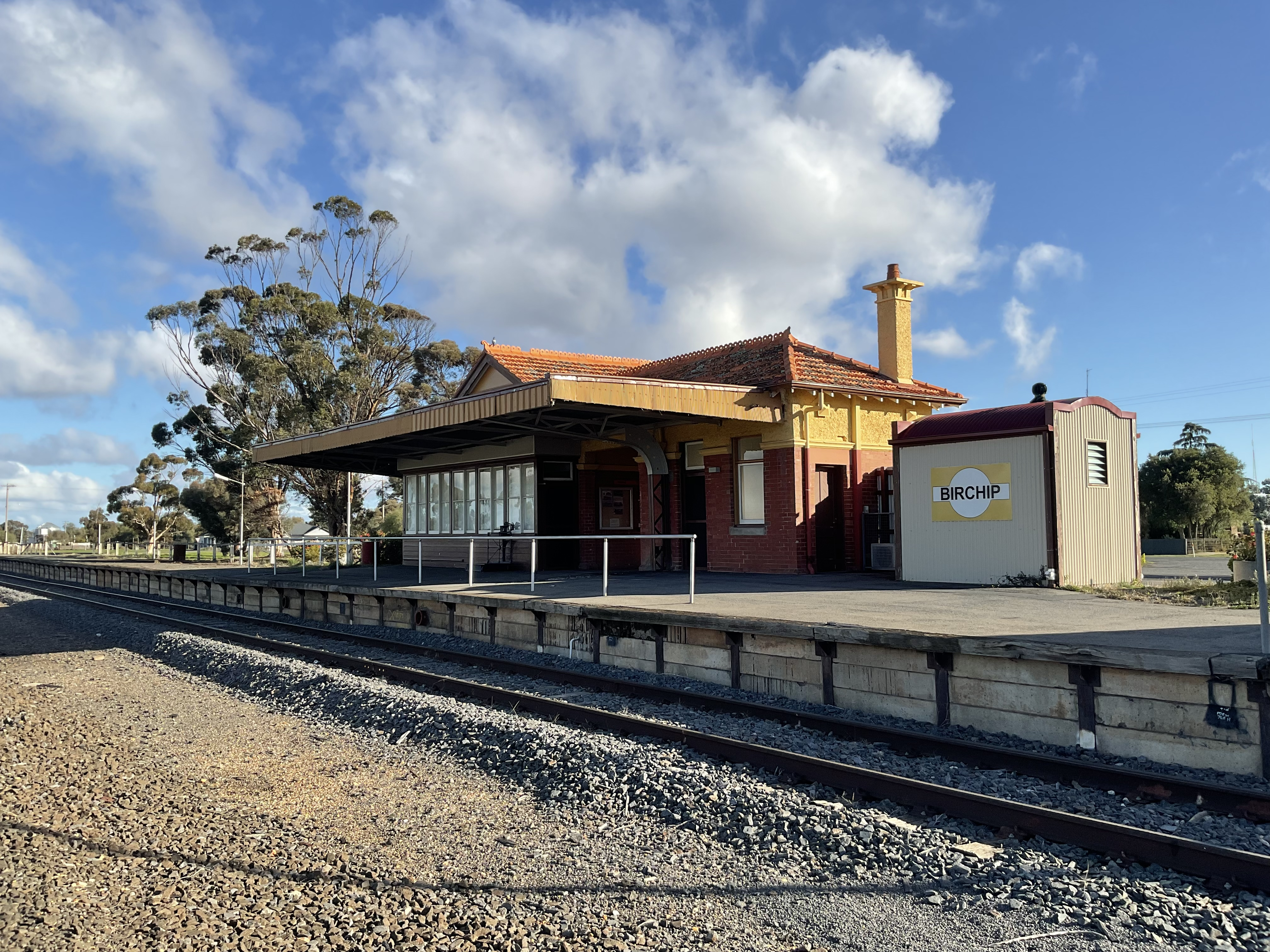
- Southbound view of the station in June 2023

General information
- Coordinates: 35°58′58.23″S 142°55′14.96″E
- Line: Mildura
- Platforms: 1
- Tracks: 1

Other information
- Status: Closed

History
- Opened: 1893
- Closed: 12 September 1993

Services
Preceding station	Disused railways	Following station
Donald	Mildura line	Woomelang
	List of closed railway stations in Victoria	
Location
- Location within Victoria

Birchip is a closed railway station, on the Mildura railway line, in the town of Birchip, Victoria, Australia. It is 389 km from Southern Cross station, in Melbourne.

In late 1987, a number of changes occurred at Birchip, including the No.2 track booked out of service, and the abolition of a number of plunger locked points and signals, with a new up signal provided, located at the down end of the Wycheproof Road level crossing. Also provided around this time was a crossing loop. Further alterations occurred in March 1990, including the removal of a number of signal posts and Annett locks.

On the 19th of October 2026, the Victorian Liberals and Nationals committed to restoring V/Line passenger rail service to Birchip by 2029 if they won the November 2026 Victorian election.
