= Mildura railway line =

Railway line in Victoria, Australia

Mildura

Overview
- Other name: Yelta
- Status: Operational
- Owner: VicTrack
- Locale: Victoria, Australia
- Termini: Yelta; Ballarat

Service
- Type: Heavy rail
- Services: Maryborough
- Operator(s): Passenger: V/Line; Freight: Pacific National

History
- Work began: 1874
- Completed: 1903
- Closed for gauge conversion: August 2017 (Yelta-Maryborough)
- Reopened: February 2018 (Yelta-Maryborough)

Technical
- Line length: 474.4 km (294.8 mi)
- Num of tracks: 1
- Track gauge: 1,435 mm (4 ft 8 1/2 in) standard gauge between Yelta and Maryborough; 1,600 mm (5 ft 3 in) between Maryborough and Ballarat
- Old gauge: 1,600mm (5 ft 3 in) broad gauge (Maryborough-Yelta)
- Signalling: Train Order Working

The Mildura railway line is a heavy rail line in northwestern Victoria, Australia. The line runs from Yelta station to Ballarat station via the settlements of Mildura, Ouyen and Maryborough in an approximate south-southeasterly direction. Initial sections of the line opened from Ballarat in 1874 and the line reached Mildura in 1903.

The line is primarily utilised by freight services. V/Line passenger services also operate on the line between Maryborough and Ballarat.

== History ==
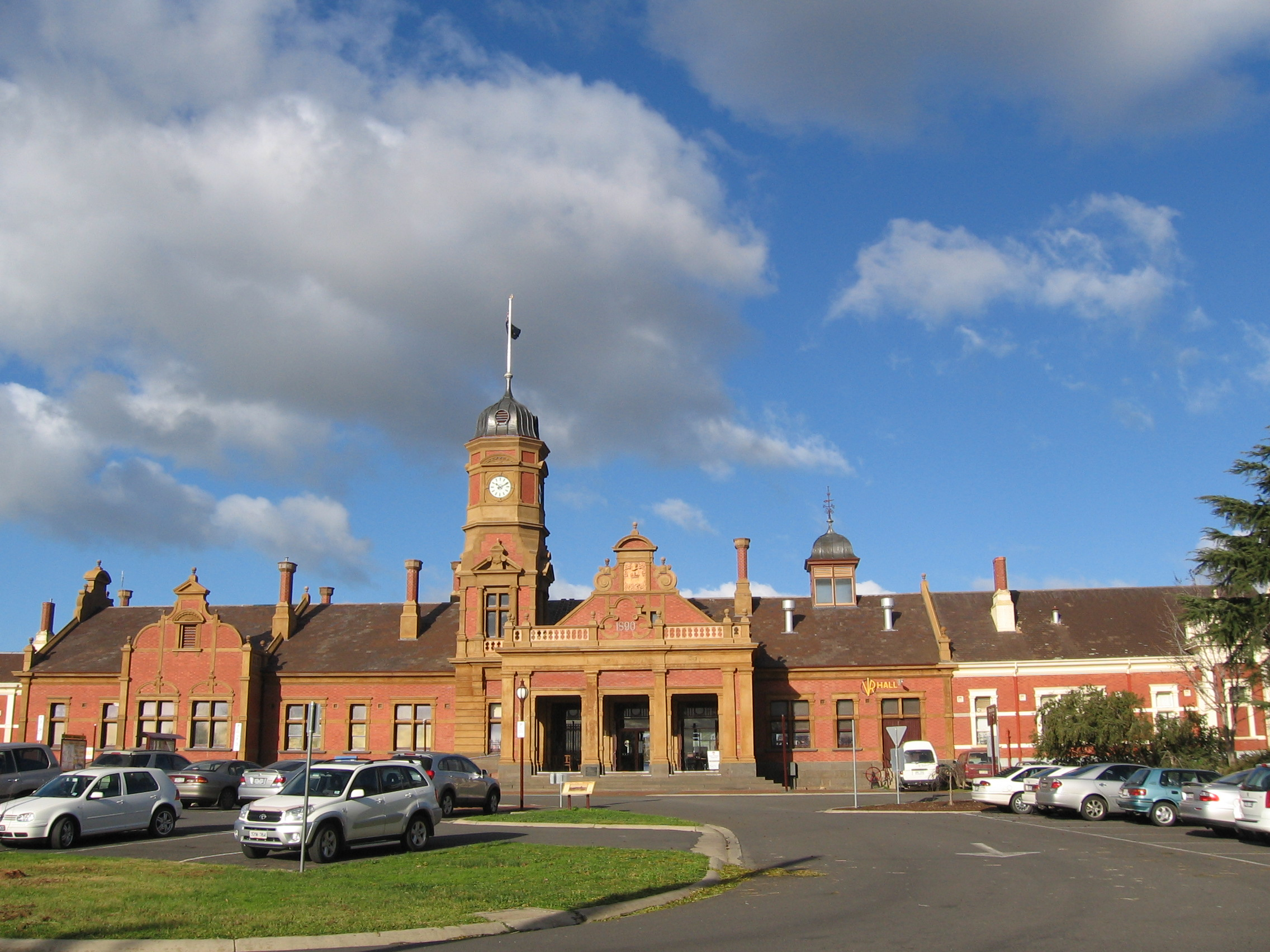
Maryborough station

The Mildura line was opened from Ballarat to Creswick, Clunes, Maryborough and Dunolly in 1874 and 1875, and extended to St Arnaud in 1878, Donald in 1882, Birchip in 1893, Woomelang in 1899, Ouyen, Red Cliffs and Mildura in 1903, Merbein in 1910 and Yelta in 1925.

A line was opened from Ballarat to Waubra in the 1880s. It closed in the 1960s.

A branch line was built from North Creswick to Daylesford in 1887, connecting with the line from Carlsruhe. It had stations at Broomfield, Allendale, Newlyn, Rocklyn, Wombat, Leonard, Sailor's Falls and Woodburn. This line closed in 1953.

A line was opened from Maryborough to connect with the Melbourne–Bendigo line at Castlemaine in 1874. This line has been partly dismantled, with only the section from Castlemaine to Maldon Junction still in use, as part of the Castlemaine to Maldon Victorian Goldfields Railway.

Another branch line was opened from Maryborough to Avoca in 1876 and Ben Nevis and Ararat in 1890. This line was closed in 1959, reopened in 1966, standardised in 1996 and closed again in 2005. It was then reopened to regular traffic in 2019 as part of the Murray Basin Rail Project. The Navarre line opened from Ben Nevis to Navarre in 1914 and it was closed in 1954.

A line was opened from Dunolly to Inglewood in 1888, connecting with the Bendigo–Boort line, completed in 1883.

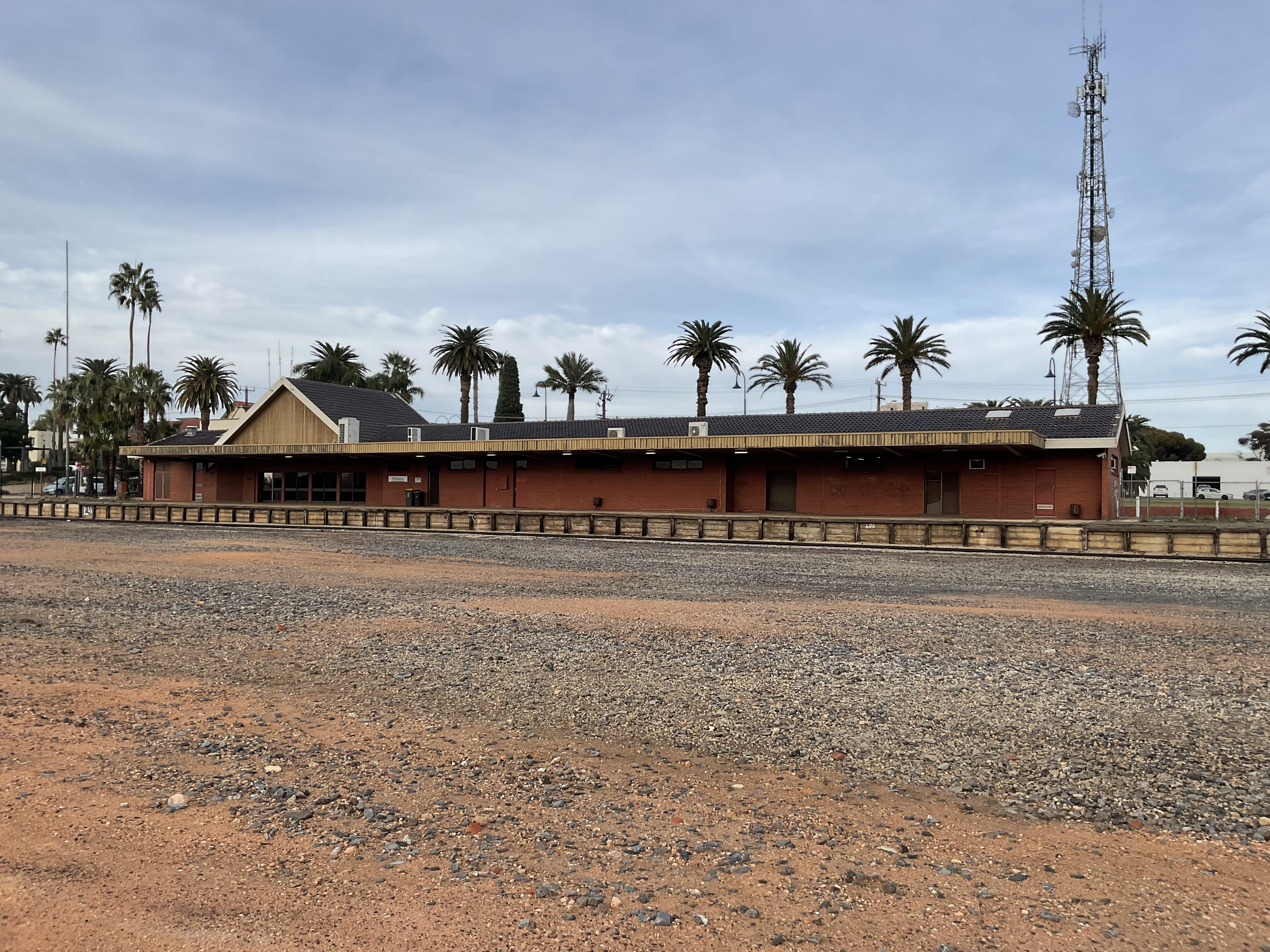
Mildura station

The Pinnaroo line (Victoria) opened from Ouyen to Murrayville in 1912 and the South Australian border in 1915, connecting with the Pinnaroo line (South Australia) to Pinnaroo and Tailem Bend. The Genesee & Wyoming Australia line west of Pinnaroo was standardised in 1998 creating a break-of-gauge. Nevertheless, it is proposed to standardise the line from Geelong to Mildura and the line between Ouyen and Pinnaroo. In 2006, state and federal money was announced to upgrade the line to Mildura with gauge convertible sleepers. However, this upgrade will still leave the passenger service in limbo.

The Morkalla line was completed from Red Cliffs to Meringur in the 1920s and extended to Morkalla in the 1930s. This line closed in the 1980s. A 2 km section of the line near Red Cliffs has been converted to a 610 mm-gauge steam railway, operated occasionally by the Red Cliffs Historical Steam Railway (see Victorian Tourism).

In 1923, a series of sidings were placed between the Mildura station and the wharves on the Murray River. These included a zig zag section to enable trains to travel between the different elevations. These sidings were removed in 1973.

A passenger service was provided by V/Line with three weekly overnight services from Melbourne (known as The Vinelander), including sleeping cars and a Motorail service, until 1993 when it was discontinued by the Kennett Government. The former Bracks/Brumby Governments promised to re-open this line to passenger traffic as part of their pledges for the 1999, 2002 and 2006 elections. They also pledged the reopening of Clunes station in the 2010 election.

In December 2007 work began on upgrading the line between Gheringhap (on the Geelong–Ballarat line) and Mildura, at a cost of $73 million and involving one in every two sleepers being replaced, and lifting maximum train speeds to 80 km/h (50 mph). Current speeds are restricted to 50 km/h on one-third of the track and are as low as 30 km/h in some sections. In April 2008 it was announced that the Mildura–Yelta section of the line would also be upgraded, as part of the Victorian core grain network in a $23.7 million package with 6 other lines.

As part of upgrades for the return of Maryborough passenger services, the crossing loops at Sulky, Tourello and Talbot stations have been removed, resulting in only one train at a time being able to use the 60 kilometres of line between Ballarat and Maryborough. The loop at Sulky was removed on 12 February, the loop at Talbot on 24 February.

In October 2010, the Victorian government released a report into public transport improvement options for the north-west of Victoria, outlining nine proposals for public transport projects. Options discussed include the return of passenger trains on the existing line, or via an extension of the Yungera line to connect to the Mildura line at Ouyen.

Passenger services were reintroduced from Ballarat to Maryborough in July 2010, after a 17-year absence.

The line closed in August 2017 north of Dunolly for conversion to standard gauge as part of the Murray Basin Rail Project. It reopened gradually from February 2018 with maximum axle load lifted to 21 tonnes and line speed increased to 80 km/h.

Despite reopening to passenger traffic in 2010, the line has continued to have very low patronage figures across all the stations on the Maryborough Line. Creswick and Talbot Railway Stations served less than 400 passengers a year in the 2020–2021 patronage figures, down from only 1,000 prior to the Covid-19 Pandemic. Clunes Station also records less than 1,000 annual passenger movements. The terminus of the current passenger services, Maryborough, serves approximately 3,600 passenger per year. In 2018–19 however, Maryborough had patronage figures of around 9,350 per annum or 25 passengers per day. There has been on-going discussions about the viability of the railway service to Maryborough with such low patronage on all stations along the branch line.

== Services ==
The main freight traffic on the line is export grain and containerised wine, grapes, citrus, dried fruit and juice, totalling around 1.5 million tonnes per year. Containers are dispatched to Melbourne from a terminal at Merbein (a short distance north of Mildura) operated by Seaway Intermodal, which handles approximately 13,000 export containers a year, as well as 500 import containers. Cement was also despatched to Mildura from Waurn Ponds until 2015, oil and less than container load (LCL) freight were carried until 2007. A freight terminal also exists at Donald, and grain services run as required.

=== Maryborough services ===
As part of the Victorian Transport Plan, the State Government announced passenger rail services on the Mildura line would be reintroduced up to Maryborough, with services beginning in 2010.

== History of passenger services ==
=== Opening train ===
The first passenger services to Mildura were for the line's opening in 1903; the first special had sleeping accommodation in ordinary car No.29 and extra car 6AB^{AB}, while the second used ordinary car No.30 and extra car 5AB^{AB}. Cars 29 and 30 were Mann Boudoir sleeping cars nominally allocated to the interstate Melbourne and Adelaide expresses, while the two AB^{AB} cars were ordinary clerestory-roofed sitting carriages with access doors either side of each compartment, no corridor, vestibule or diaphragms; half of each car was allocated to First Class passengers and the other to Second Class. The outer two compartments were for ten smoking passengers each and had no access to the internal lavatories, while inner four compartments (one general, one Ladies for each class) had a five- and a four-seat bench, then a narrow corridor on one side to access the lavatory half-compartment built for that section in something of an interlocking ℕ-shape. Between the two lavatory compartments of each side there was a small void for a water tank. The twelve total seating benches (eight long, four short) could be lifted up to make room for sleeping accommodation.

=== Early services ===
Printed shortly after the line opened, a Bradshaw's Guide dated sometime between 1903 and 1907 indicates a Mixed service (combined goods and passenger train) from Castlemaine, reversing after spending about two hours at Maryborough, twice per day (Sundays excluded) as far as St Arnaud. The morning train would continue to Donald, then to Birchip (Mondays and Wednesdays excluded), to Woomelang (Saturdays excluded), and on to Mildura (Thursdays excluded), with the two remaining weekly services arriving at Mildura around 6 am on the Wednesday and Saturday. The afternoon train would continue from St Arnaud to Donald only on Tuesdays, Thursdays and Saturdays, arriving 10:40 pm.

Up direction services were a Monday and Wednesday-only Mixed train from Mildura at 5:35 pm, passing Woomelang around midnight and arriving Donald at 5:15 am the next day; from Donald a train would depart six days per week at 5:50 am to Maryborough and Castlemaine, connecting with a through passenger train. there was an additional service from Woomelang on Fridays at 7 am, joined on Mondays from Birchip and Wednesdays from Donald, then all days from St Arnaud to Castlemaine.

Sleeping cars were provided on the Mildura service. Assuming the given date of c.1903 to 1907 is accurate, these were probably the permanent allocation the two AB^{AB} cars discussed above.

== See also ==
- Avoca railway line
