= Donald railway station =

Former railway station in Victoria, Australia

Donald
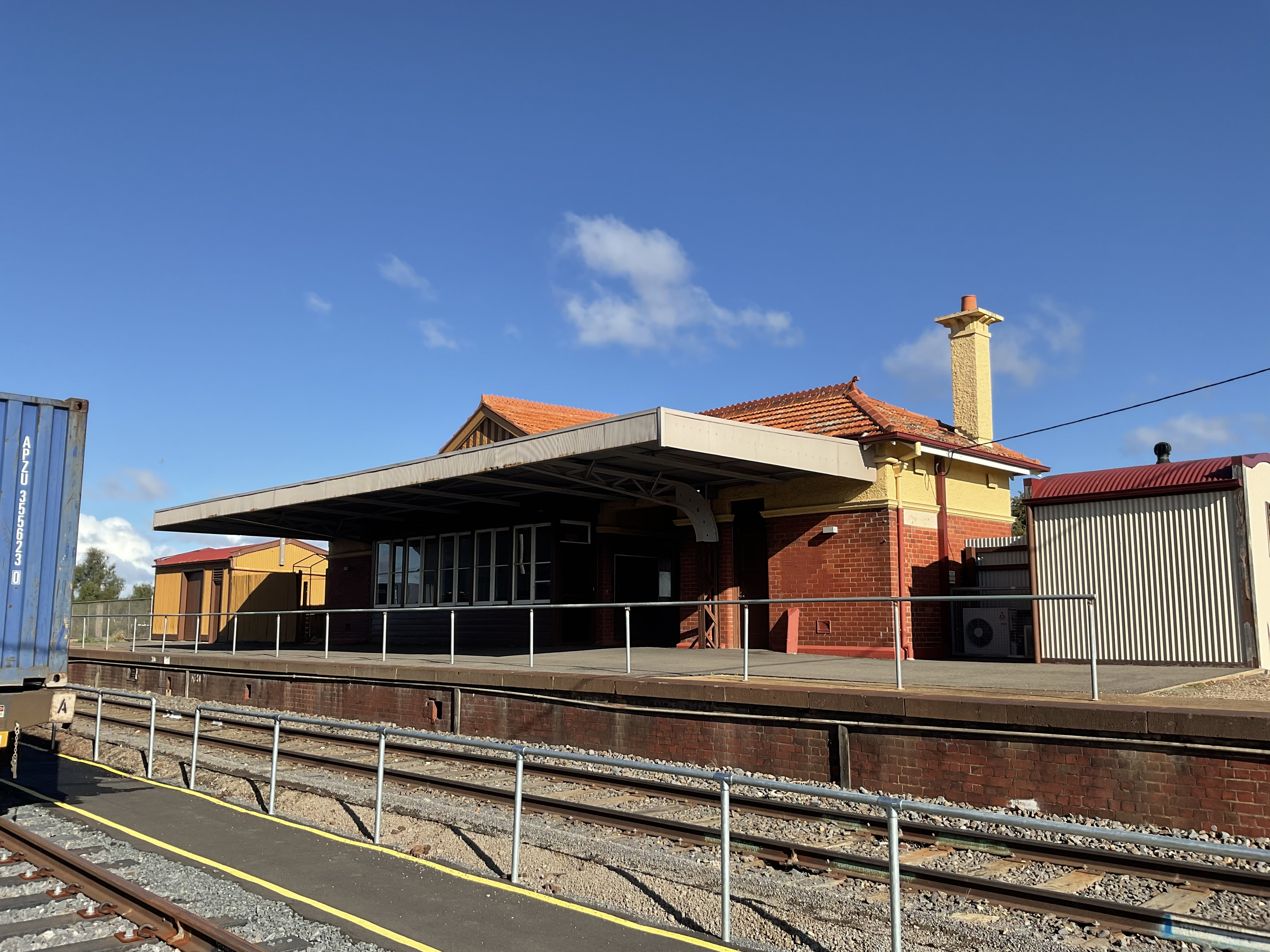
- Eastbound view of the station in June 2023

General information
- Coordinates: 36°22′09″S 142°59′16″E
- Line: Mildura
- Platforms: 1
- Tracks: 4

Other information
- Status: Closed

History
- Opened: 1882
- Closed: 12 September 1993

Services
| Preceding station | Disused railways | Following station |
|---|---|---|
| St Arnaud | Mildura line | Birchip |
| | List of closed railway stations in Victoria | |
Location
- Location within Victoria

Donald is a closed railway station on the Mildura line, in Donald, Victoria, Australia. It is 294 km from Southern Cross station. The station contains a freight yard, however, the former BP and Mobil sidings were abolished in September 1987.

On the 19th of October 2026, the Victorian Liberals and Nationals committed to restoring V/Line passenger rail service to Dimboola by 2029 if they won the November 2026 Victorian state election.
