= The Vinelander =

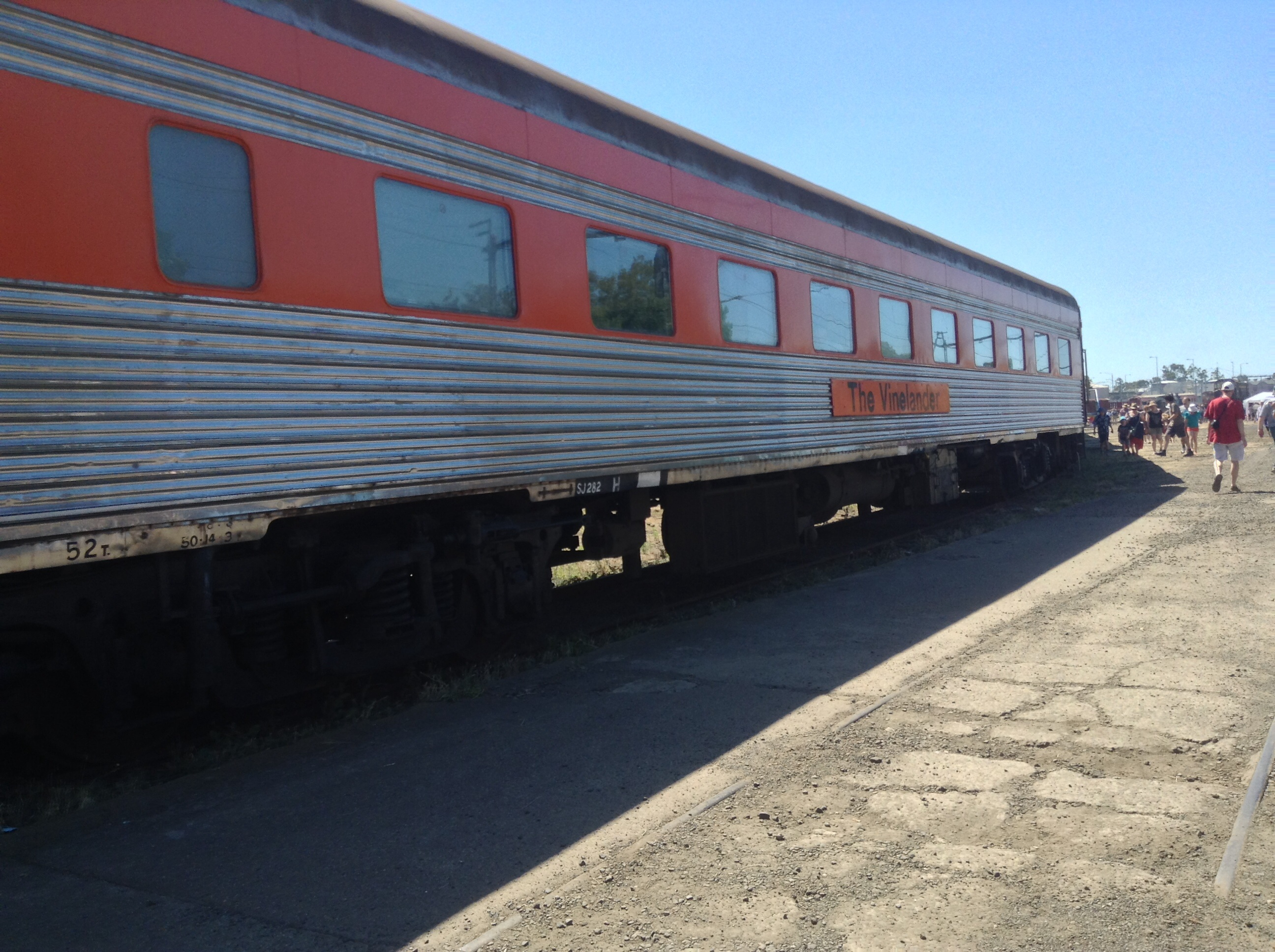
- Preserved Vinelander carriage at Newport Workshops, March 2014

Overview
- Service type: Overnight sleeper train
- Status: Ceased
- First service: 9 August 1972
- Last service: 12 September 1993
- Former operator: V/Line

Route
- Termini: Melbourne; Mildura
- Distance travelled: 609 kilometres
- Lines used: Serviceton; Mildura

The Vinelander was an Australian passenger train operated by the Victorian Railways and, later, V/Line between Melbourne and Mildura from August 1972 until September 1993. Operating overnight along the Mildura line, it included motorail and sleeping car facilities.

== History ==
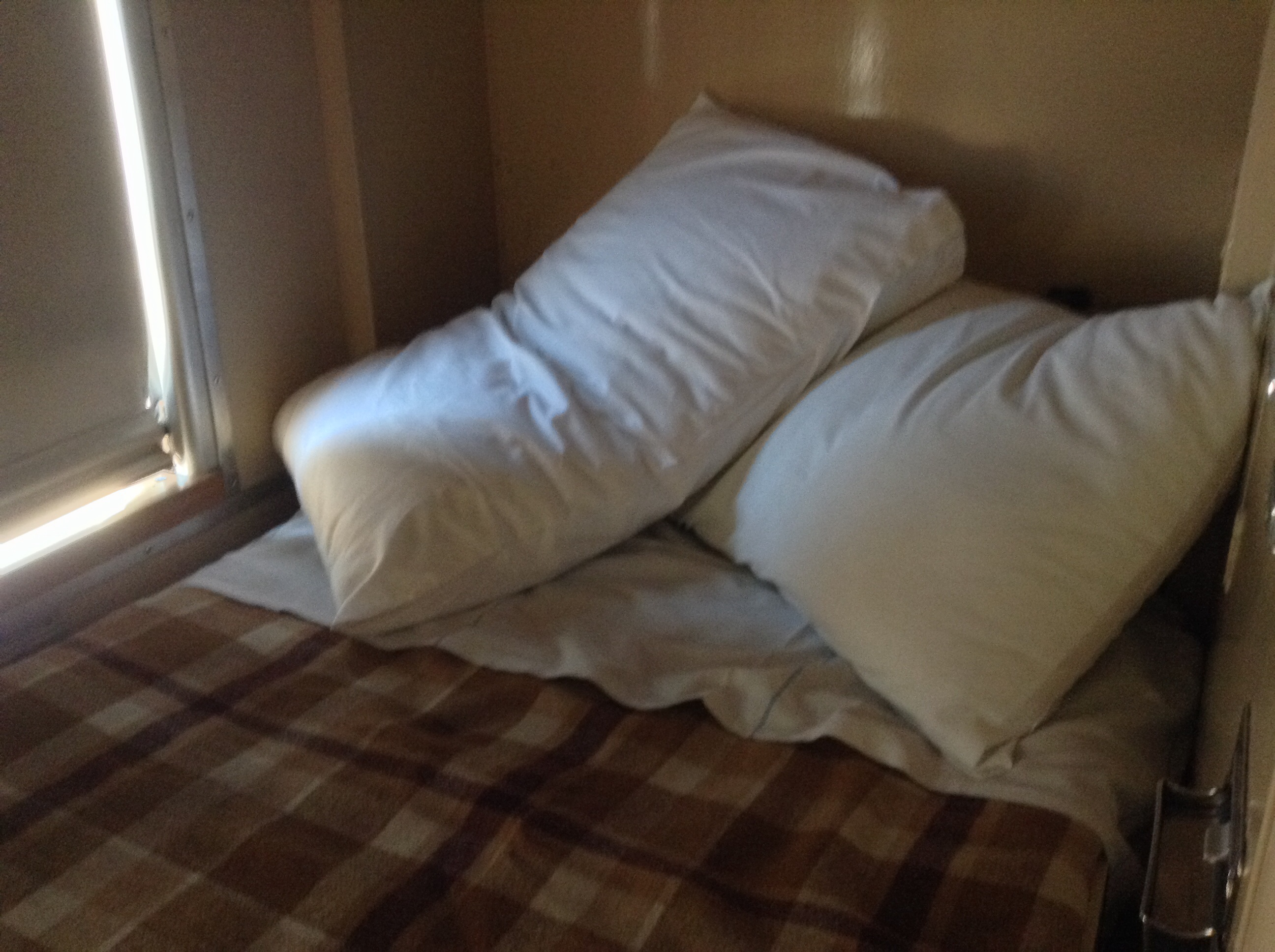
Sleeping facilities

On 3 September 1957, a trial daylight service, the Mildura Sunlight was introduced by the Victorian Railways between Melbourne and Mildura, running thrice weekly. Air-conditioned Z type carriage stock was used.

An overnight train replaced that service in 1967, and a motorail service was added in 1968.

The Vinelander first ran on 9 August 1972, after intense local lobbying for an upgrade of the existing overnight service. The name was the winner of competition held by the Victorian Railways. As of 28 November that year, the 94 total return trips had included 22 late arrivals in Melbourne and 18 late arrivals in Mildura; of those 40 incidents, 25 were less than ten minutes. From 18 March 1974 the Melbourne-bound train was altered to operate via Bacchus Marsh instead of via North Geelong, with a new arrival time of 7:45am at Spencer Street.

Steel sleeping cars, formerly employed on The Overland, were used, along with older wooded-bodied stock. A buffet car and bar was added to the train from 18 July 1977, but drunken behaviour became a problem, requiring the removal of offending passengers at intermediate stations. The typical timetable of the 1970s had a Melbourne departure at 21:20 and an arrival into Mildura at 08:05.

The train was promoted as one of the Victorian Railways' premier trains and, in 1974, the Victorian Railways sponsored a race meeting at the Mildura Racing Club, which included the awarding of the "Vinelander Plate".

In 1984, a parallel road coach commenced operations. A day train, The Sunraysia, was introduced in 1987 but was withdrawn in 1990.

By November 1986, The Vinelander was only operating two nights per week, with The Sunraysia daylight service running as a replacement on some other days. The price of the sleeping car service also rose. From $17 per berth in 1985, it had increased to $30 per berth by July 1986. Staff levels were reduced, with one conductor managing two carriages (prior to that there was a one-to-one ratio), which was seen by some as an attempt by V/Line management to cut back the service.

== Introduction of The Sunraysia ==
From 15 February 1987 The Vinelander was altered to only operate on Thursdays, Fridays and Sundays, with The Sunraysia working on other days; V/Line projected that this would result in a 10 per cent increase in Mildura line patronage. At the time the train service was competing with V/Line's own bus services, as well as six flights per day. The new arrangement included reduction of the day trains from four to three sitting carriages, and combined with the removal of the sleeping cars this gave a net capacity reduction of 400 seats/berths each way per week. The change also coincided with a reversal of the train marshalling, with the D luggage vans now at the Mildura end of the train and the Motorail wagons now at the Melbourne end.

== Demise ==
The last Vinelander service ran on 12 September 1993, following cutbacks imposed by the Kennett Government. A service review was announced by the incoming Bracks Government in 2000, in part due to the independent member for Mildura, Russell Savage, backing the formation of a minority Labor government after the 1999 Victorian state election. However, the service never returned.

== Withdrawal ==
The withdrawal of The Vinelander in 1993 occurred under controversial circumstances. Two days before the service was scheduled to be axed, intending passengers were on the platform at Spencer Street station, ready to board the train to Mildura, when it was announced that it had been cancelled due to a landslide along the track. Despite the very short notice of the cancellation, buses were conveniently available as an alternative. Suspicions about the supposed landslide story were aroused when it was noted that it hadn't blocked the Melbourne-bound Vinelander that same evening.

A leaked document from the train controllers working that evening also aroused suspicion, and an investigation revealed that the story about the landslide was a hoax.

V/Line management failed to give any clear explanation for their actions and it is widely believed that the sudden cancellation of the final Vinelander service was done to avoid protests planned for the officially-announced withdrawal of the service a couple of days later, such as had occurred earlier at Bairnsdale.
