= Mildura railway station =

Former railway line in Victoria, Australia

Mildura
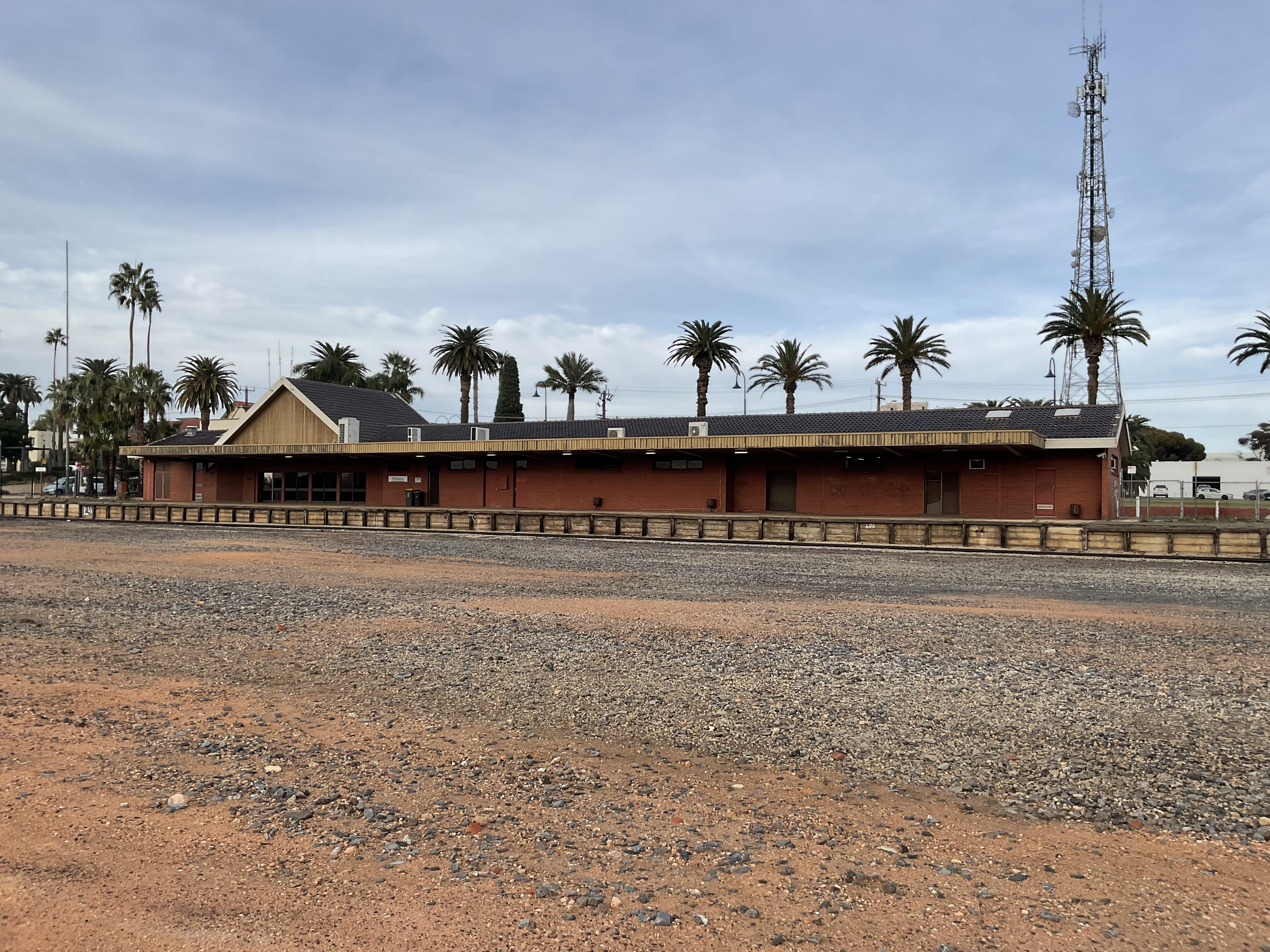
- View of the station in June 2023

General information
- Coordinates: 34°10′55″S 142°09′48″E
- Line: Mildura
- Platforms: 1
- Tracks: 1

Other information
- Status: Closed

History
- Opened: 13 November 1903
- Closed: 12 September 1993

Services
Preceding station	Disused railways	Following station
Irymple	Mildura line	Yelta
	List of closed railway stations in Victoria	
Location
- Location within Victoria

Mildura was the passenger terminus for the Mildura railway line in Victoria, Australia. Located in the city of Mildura it is located on the eastern side of the town centre, alongside the Murray River. Although there has not been a passenger rail service since 1993, the Victorian Labor Government promised to return the service in 1999, though it has yet to return as of 2026.

The station is served by V/Line and NSW TrainLink coach services.

== History ==
Agitation for a railway to Mildura commenced as far back as 1888, but it was not until 1898 that the Victorian Parliament recommended the extension of the Ultima line to Mildura, however this was overturned and the Woomelang line extended north instead. The turning of the first sod at the station site was held in November 1901, by October 1903 rails had been laid up to Mildura, the official opening being on 13 November. Between 1922 and 1928 a railmotor service operated between Red Cliffs and Mildura stations to serve local passengers. Major freight consigned from the region included bulk grain, sheep and cattle, and locally grown fruit.

In 1923, a series of sidings were placed between the Mildura railway station and the wharves on the Murray River. These included a zig-zag section to enable trains to travel between the different elevations. These sidings were removed in 1973. Mildura was once the destination of The Vinelander, the only Victorian intrastate passenger train to have both motorail and sleeping car facilities for passengers. The current station building dates to November 1979.

In late 2009, removal of the station yard at Mildura commenced, with only a single track and the station buildings and platform retained. All other buildings and additional rail infrastructure, including additional tracks and the refuelling area were demolished. The project was carried out by the Rural City of Mildura along with Regional Development Victoria to open up the riverfront area, with $8 million in funding provided by the State Government. As part of the work a new rail freight facility will be constructed to the west of the existing Merbein terminal, as well as refurbishment of the sidings at Red Cliffs for the storage of maintenance equipment.

On the 19th of October 2026, the Victorian Liberals and Nationals committed to restoring V/Line passenger rail service to Mildura by 2029 if they won the November 2026 Victorian election.

== Traffic ==
The main freight traffic on the line is export grain and containerised wine, grapes, citrus, dried fruit and juice, totalling around 1.5 million tonnes per year. Containers are dispatched to Melbourne from a terminal at Merbein (north of the station) operated by Seaway Intermodal which handles approximately 13000 export containers a year, as well as 500 import containers. Cement was also despatched to Mildura from Waurn Ponds (near Geelong) until 2016, oil and LCL containers were carried until 2007.

Today, Mildura lacks passenger rail services, but it is a stop on a number of V/Line operated coach routes, with the station building utilised as a waiting room and a location to purchase coach tickets. A service review was announced by the Bracks Government in 2000, in part due to the independent politician Russell Savage enabling the formation of a minority Labor government in the 1999 Victorian state election. The service has yet to be returned, but as recently as 2007 the Labor Party was stating that the freight upgrade as the "first stage in the reintroduction of passenger rail to Mildura". In July 2009 the government announced that it would start another transport study into the return of passenger rail services "soon", though to date, passenger services have only returned as far as Maryborough.

NSW TrainLink coaches connect the station to Broken Hill and Cootamundra, the latter via Griffith.

== Gallery ==
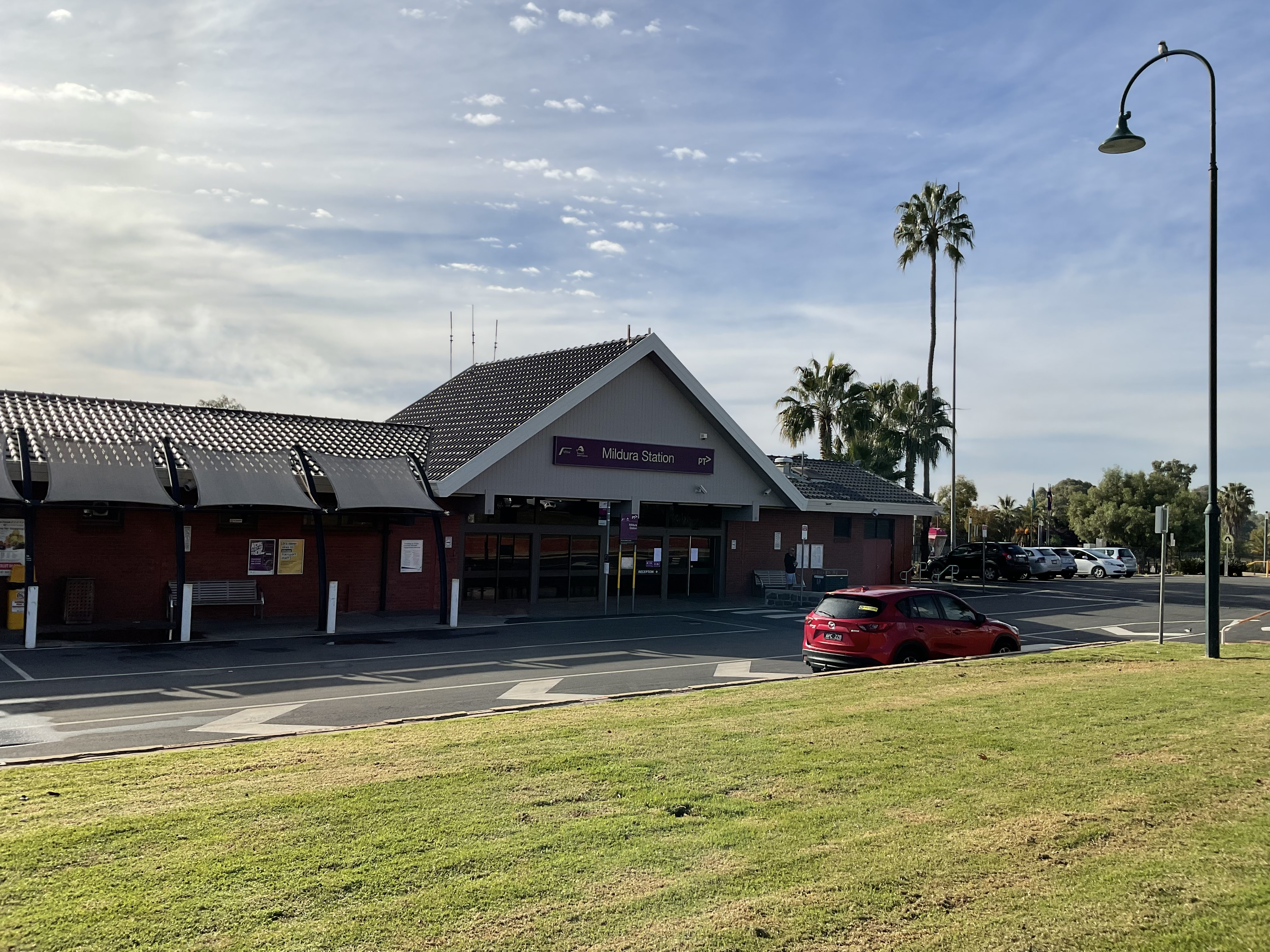
Station entrance in June 2023

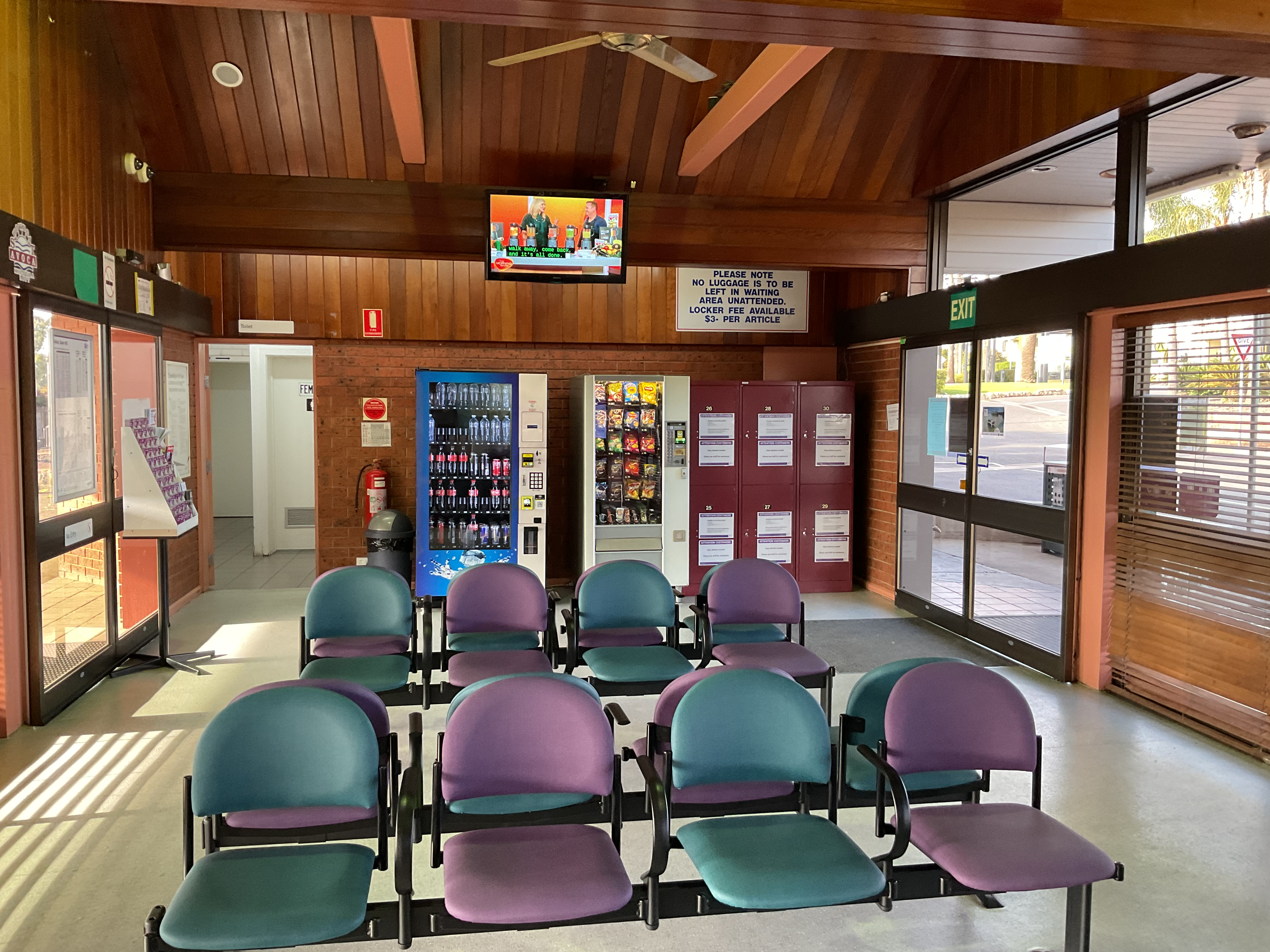
Waiting room area in June 2023

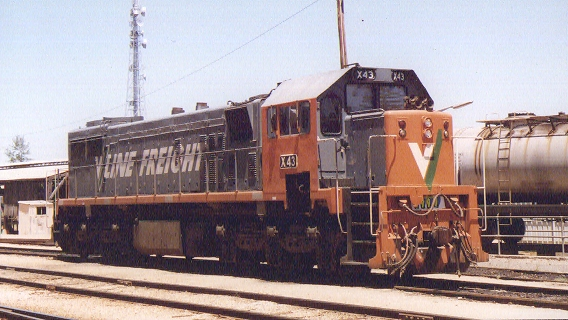
X43 in the now removed station yard in 1992
