= Ben Nevis railway station =

Former railway station in Victoria, Australia

Coordinates: 37°11′33″S 143°07′00″E

Ben Nevis railway station is an abandoned station on the Avoca railway line, a railway line running from Ararat to Avoca and onto Maryborough in the Australian state of Victoria. It also acted as the terminus of the abandoned Navarre railway line to Navarre, a community in the Wimmera region of Victoria, which was closed in 1954.

Little remained of the station in 2013 situated near the intersection of the Pyrenees Highway and the Buangor – Ben Nevis Road, although earthworks associated with it are clearly visible nearby as can the rail lines themselves.

== Proposal ==
In 2017, there is a proposal entitled the, Murray Basin rail project designed to link Mildura to Portland with standard gauge track to carry grain and mineral sands. This upgrading will include the Maryborough to Ararat section of the line, past the site of the disused Ben Nevis station.

The Avoca line reopened in 2018 after a complete rebuild as part of the Murray Basin Rail Project, which also extended the reach of the standard gauge network in Victoria.

== See also ==
- Ararat railway station
- Avoca railway line
- Avoca railway station
- Homebush railway station, Victoria
- Navarre railway line

| Preceding station | Disused railways | Following station |
|---|---|---|
| Elmhurst | Avoca | Ararat |
| Terminus | Navarre | Crowlands |
| | List of closed railway stations in Victoria | |
