= Fishermans Bend railway station =

Railway station in Melbourne, Australia

Fishermans Bend
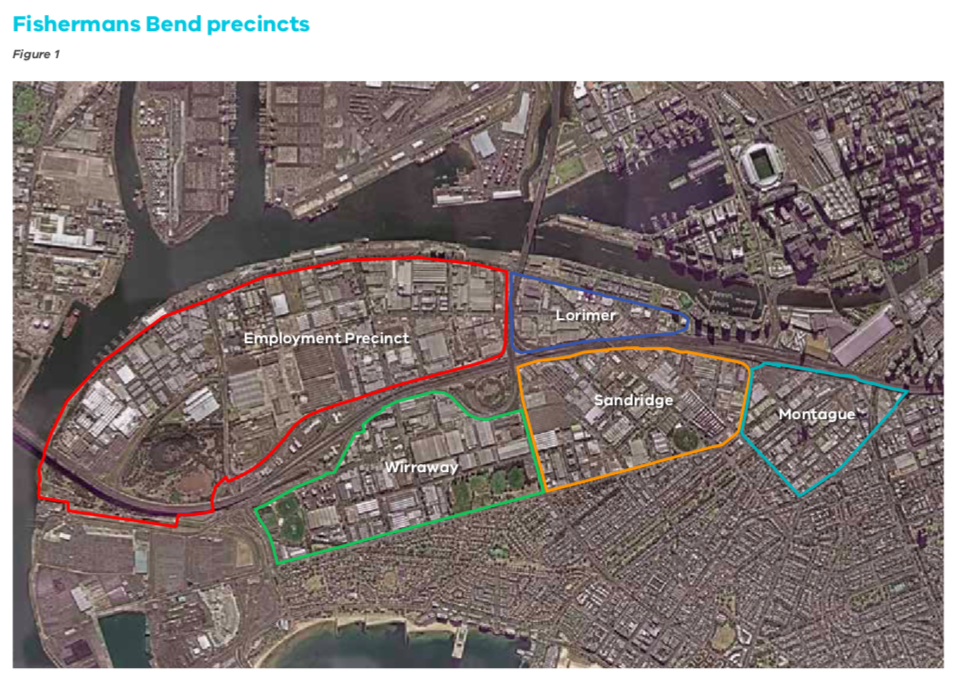
- The station will be located within the Employment precinct.

General information
- Location: Fishermans Bend, Melbourne, Victoria; Australia
- Operator: Metro Trains Melbourne
- Manager: VicTrack
- Lines: Mernda; Werribee; Melbourne Metro 2
- Platforms: 2 (Island)
- Tracks: 2

Construction
- Structure type: Underground
- Parking: Yes
- Cycle facilities: Yes
- Accessible: Yes

Other information
- Status: Proposed

Services
Preceding station	Metro Trains	Following station
Sandridge towards Mernda via Parkville	Werribee line	Newport towards Werribee

Fishermans Bend is a proposed station to be built within the Fishermans Bend redevelopment as part of the Fishermans Bend Integrated Transport Plan. The station is proposed to be built as an underground station as part of the wider Melbourne Metro 2 project. The station is proposed to be served by the Mernda and Werribee lines.

== History ==
A station and heavy rail line through Fishermans Bend has been proposed on numerous occasions over many decades. With more recent proposals also suggesting a tram extension from either Docklands or from the Port Melbourne light rail line. In 2019, Melbourne Metro 2 was proposed which consisted of a new underground heavy rail line from Clifton Hill to Newport West via Parkville and Fishermans Bend. The new line would also be constructed alongside an extension of electrification from Werribee to Geelong.

The plan was updated in 2024 with the public release of the Fishermans Bend Integrated Transport Plan. This plan set out a preferred route from Newport to Southern Cross with stations at Fishermans Bend and Sandridge in the new development. This project was updated to be split into three phases. Phase one would see the swapping of the Route 86 and Route 109 terminus. Phase two would see the opening of a tram extension from the Port Melbourne light rail line into Fishermans Bend and Phase three seeing the construction of the heavy rail line. The station and the rest of Melbourne Metro 2 is expected to be open by 2050.

== Services ==
Fishermans Bend is proposed to be served by the Melbourne Metro 2 route. Services from the station are proposed to run to Werribee in the southwest and Mernda to the north

Fishermans Bend platform arrangement
Platform	Line	Destination	Via	Service Type	Notes	Source
1	Mernda line	Mernda	Parkville	All stations and limited express services		
2	Werribee line	Werribee		All stations and limited express services		
