= Elmhurst railway station =

Former railway station in Victoria, Australia

Coordinates: 37°10′31″S 143°14′52″E

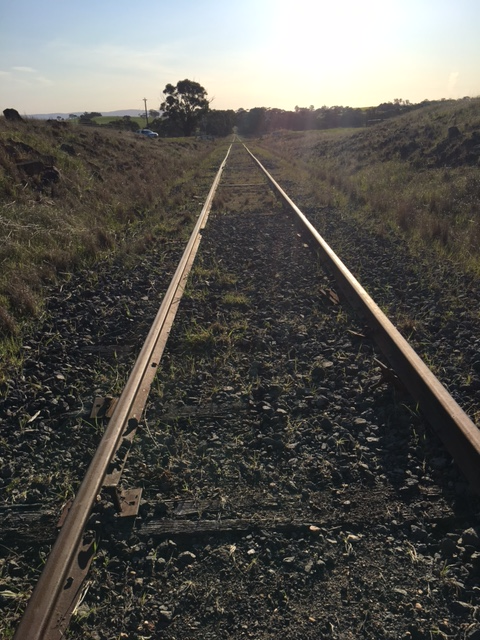
The Avoca Railway line west of Bung Bong

The disused Elmhurst railway station was a rail station in Elmhurst, Victoria, Australia on the Avoca railway line.

== Proposal ==
In 2017, there is a proposal entitled the Murray Basin rail project designed to link Mildura to Portland with standard gauge track to carry grain and mineral sands. This upgrading will include the Maryborough to Ararat section of the line, past the site of the disused Elmhurst railway station.

== See also ==
- Ararat railway station
- Avoca railway line
- Avoca railway station
- Ben Nevis railway station
- Homebush railway station, Victoria
