= Rail Projects Victoria =

Government agency

Project team overview
- Formed: 16 February 2015; 11 years ago (as Melbourne Metro Rail Authority)
- Dissolved: 2 April 2024; 2 years ago
- Type: Project team
- Headquarters: Melbourne, Victoria, Australia
- Employees: ▲363 (June 2018)
- Minister responsible: Danny Pearson, Minister for Transport and Infrastructure
- Project team executive: Evan Tattersall, CEO
- Parent department: Department of Transport and Planning
- Parent authority: Major Transport Infrastructure Authority
- Website: bigbuild.vic.gov.au/about/mtia/rail-projects-victoria

Rail Projects Victoria (RPV) was a project team of the Government of Victoria, Australia, responsible for the management of certain major infrastructure projects on the Victorian rail network, such as Metro Tunnel, Regional Rail Revival and Melbourne Airport Rail. Originally established as the Melbourne Metro Rail Authority (MMRA), to deliver the Melbourne Metro Rail Project, the office was later expanded in its responsibilities to include the management and planning of a number of major infrastructure programs on V/Line's regional rail services. In January 2019, it was renamed to RPV to reflect its expanded scope. It also ceased to be an independent office and became a project team within the Department of Transport and Planning's Major Transport Infrastructure Authority (MITA).

On 2 April 2024, the Regional Rail Revival and Melbourne Airport Rail projects were transferred to the Level Crossing Removal Project team, and RPV was replaced by Metro Tunnel Project. The Metro Tunnel Project continued to be a project team within the new Victorian Infrastructure Delivery Authority, which had replaced MITA on the same day.

== Organisational history ==
For much of the history of the Victorian railway network, construction work was carried out by the Construction Branch of the vertically integrated Victorian Railways (VR). The first major rail infrastructure project in Melbourne to be delivered by an independent entity was the City Loop railway line, which began construction in 1971. The Melbourne Underground Rail Loop Authority (MURLA), established by the Melbourne Underground Rail Loop Act 1970, pioneered a new approach to construction management, where the MURLA employed only a small staff and most work was outsourced to a private consortium by contract. The administrative costs of MURLA were jointly met by the VR, the Melbourne City Council and the Melbourne and Metropolitan Board of Works from their annual budgets, separately to the costs of the project itself.

The Metro Tunnel project was first proposed in 2008 by the state government led by John Brumby, following the Eddington Transport Study's recommendation of a new north–south rail connection. It was realigned and rebranded as the Melbourne Rail Link under premier Denis Napthine in 2014, but reverted to closely match its original form when the Liberal government lost the 2014 Victorian election. The establishment of the MMRA was announced in February 2015 with a commitment of $40 million. Premier Daniel Andrews, making the announcement, described the authority's initial task as managing the planning and site investigation works required to formally commence the Metro Tunnel project. The funding was brought forward from a promise made at the 2014 election for $300 million towards the project in the first budget of the new Labor government.

From a machinery of government perspective, the creation of the MMRA was part of the reorganisation of the Department of Transport, Planning and Local Infrastructure (DTPLI) into the Department of Economic Development, Jobs, Transport and Resources (DEDJTR). Responsibility for the Rail Office of the "Moving Victoria" program was transferred to DEDJTR from DTPLI and during this process, the Office was renamed and reconstituted as MMRA, reporting to the newly created Coordinator General, Major Transport Infrastructure Program.

On 10 March 2015, Evan Tattersall was appointed as the chief executive officer of the MMRA. Previously, Tattersall had been involved in the delivery of the Regional Rail Link and the redevelopment of Melbourne's Southern Cross station. Many of the original staff of the MMRA transferred from other rail infrastructure projects in Melbourne, or from international projects such as London's Crossrail.

At the same time as the publication of the Regional Network Development Plan in 2016, a series of major upgrade works for the Ballarat line were announced. In November of that year, Minister for Public Transport Jacinta Allan announced that the Ballarat Line Upgrade would be managed by a dedicated project team established within the MMRA, noting the potential for the projects, together, to result in electrification of the line to Melton. Planning for the upgrade project was carried out on this basis, with Evan Tattersall describing extension of suburban services as a "long-term aspiration" that could be completed following the opening of the Metro Tunnel.

Prior to the 2017 Victorian Budget, the Andrews government announced that the Ballarat Line Upgrade would be augmented by improvements to each of Victoria's regional passenger rail lines, to be collectively branded as the Regional Rail Revival. Then, in April, the government announced that the MMRA would be renamed Rail Projects Victoria, and begin work on a Melbourne Airport rail link and a high-speed rail line to Geelong. The reorganisation was welcomed by the Public Transport Users Association, who observed that a single rail construction authority would be able to coordinate projects and efficiently manage specialised resources.

In mid-2018, it was reported that RPV would take over the Murray Basin Rail Project from V/Line, following problems with the latter's management of the program.

On 1 January 2019, with the division of DEDJTR into the Department of Jobs, Precincts and Regions and the Department of Transport, RPV was abolished as an independent administrative office and incorporated into the new Major Transport Infrastructure Authority as a project team.

On 2 April 2024, the Major Transport Infrastructure Authority merged with Victorian Health Building Authority to form Victorian Infrastructure Delivery Authority (VIDA). The Regional Rail Revival and Melbourne Airport Rail projects were also transferred to the Level Crossing Removal Project, and the RPV project team was replaced by the Metro Tunnel Project to focus on testing and commissioning.

== Projects ==
=== Metro Tunnel ===
The Metro Tunnel is a pair of 9 km (5.6 mi) rail tunnels between South Kensington in Melbourne's inner north-west and South Yarra in the city's inner south-east. Currently under construction, the tunnels will connect the Sunbury line to the Cranbourne and Pakenham lines through the Melbourne CBD. The project includes five new stations – Arden, Parkville, State Library, Town Hall and Anzac – and will increase the capacity of the inner Melbourne network by releasing train paths in the existing City Loop underground railway. The tunnel opened in late 2025.

RPV is responsible for the delivery of the Metro Tunnel project, including property acquisitions, planning approvals and ensuring positive social outcomes. It appointed a consortium led by Lendlease and John Holland to construct the tunnels in late 2017.

=== Regional Rail Revival ===
Regional Rail Revival is the collective branding for a series of major maintenance and development works overseen by RPV on the regional Victorian rail network. The first works to be announced were the Ballarat Line Upgrade, a $518 million package of works including several new crossing loops on the Ballarat corridor, new stabling facilities for trains at Ararat, and several station upgrades along the route.

The Bendigo line upgrade works include improved signalling north of Bendigo, and works to increase permissible track speed between Bendigo and Echuca. The Gippsland line includes duplication and stabling facilities, as well as the eventual replacement of the rail bridge over the Avon River. The Geelong and Warrnambool lines will also receive lengths of duplication and signalling improvements.

=== Melbourne Airport rail link ===
RPV is responsible for planning, procurement and delivery of a rail line to Melbourne Airport. Construction is expected to begin in 2022 along a preferred route via Sunshine in the city's west, with funding from state and federal governments as well as the private sector. An expression of interest process closed in late 2018 and a detailed business case will be completed by RPV in 2019.

=== Western Rail Plan ===
From April 2018, RPV became responsible for planning and managing electrification of lines to Melton and Wyndham Vale, at the same time as investigating a dedicated high-speed alignment to Geelong. This work was later announced as part of the state government's Western Rail Plan, in additional to the possible high-speed electrification of the Geelong and Ballarat lines.

== See also ==
- Level Crossing Removal Authority – another DEDJTR infrastructure administrative office
- List of Victoria Government Infrastructure Plans, Proposals and Studies
