= Melbourne Metro =

Melbourne Metro or Melbourne metro may refer to:

- Metro Trains Melbourne, the operator of the suburban railway network in Melbourne, Australia
- Railways in Melbourne, the rail network of Melbourne, Australia
- Metro Tunnel, the underground rail project originally known as Melbourne Metro Rail, consisting of a tunnel between South Kensington and South Yarra enabling the Sunbury line to through-run with the Pakenham line and Cranbourne line in Melbourne, Australia
- Melbourne Metro 2, a proposed underground rail project in Melbourne, Australia, that would build a tunnel between Newport and Clifton Hill to enable the Werribee line to through-run with the Mernda line
