= Crowlands railway station, Victoria =

Former railway station in Victoria, Australia

Crowlands railway station

History
- Opened: May 1914
- Closed: 24 February 1954

Services
| Preceding station | Disused railways | Following station |
|---|---|---|
| Ben Nevis | Navarre | Joel |
| | List of closed railway stations in Victoria | |

Crowlands railway station was the first station on the closed Navarre railway line. Crowlands is a township located approximately 24 kilometres (15 mi) northeast of the town of Ararat.
