= Joel railway station, Victoria =

Former railway station in Victoria, Australia

Coordinates: 37°00′45″S 143°00′18″E

Joel railway station was on the Navarre railway line in Victoria, Australia, 10 1/4 miles (16.5 km) from where the line branched off from the Avoca railway line. The station was formally opened in May 1914, with P. Foley as its first stationmaster. It was in what was then known as Joel South. "Joel Joel", or "Joel" as it became known, was named after Joel Pennington, the manager of a local pastoral property.

The station closed with the line in February 1954.

Preceding station	Disused railways	Following station
Crowlands	Navarre	Landsborough
	List of closed railway stations in Victoria	
