= Elmhurst station =

Elmhurst station could refer to:

- Elmhurst (LIRR station) in Elmhurst, Queens
- Elmhurst station (Illinois) in Elmhurst, Illinois
- Elmhurst railway station in Elmhurst, Victoria, Australia
