= Landsborough railway station, Victoria =

Former railway station in Victoria, Australia

Landsborough railway station was one of the main railway stations on the Navarre railway line in Victoria, Australia. The station was located 14½ miles (23 km) from its connection with the Avoca railway line and approximately 5 miles (7 km) west of the township of Landsborough which is situated in the Shire of Pyrenees, north west of Melbourne, Victoria. Originally the station was to be known as "Warlip Station", but was changed to "Landsborough Station", shortly before the line opened in May 1914.

The railway station had a direct road connection with the town along Landsborough Road and was later linked by telephone. Four timber mills operated in the vicinity and for a time were the major users of the line. Although a short "loop line" existed it was argued that it should be extended to meet demand with as many as 25 rail trucks being loaded at any one time.

The station closed with the closure of the line in 1954.

Preceding station	Disused railways	Following station
Joel	Navarre	Tulkara
	List of closed railway stations in Victoria	
