= Homebush railway station, Victoria =

Former railway station in Victoria, Australia

Homebush railway station
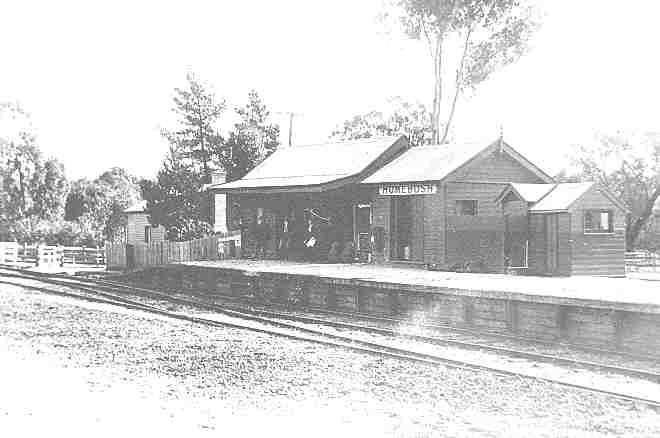
- Homebush railway station as it stood in the 1890s. It was burnt out in the 1980s.

General information
- Coordinates: 37.0631°S 143.5353°E

History
- Opened: October 1874
- Closed: 1979

Services
Preceding station	Disused railways	Following station
Maryborough	Avoca	Avoca
Location

Homebush railway station is a former station on the Avoca railway line in Victoria, Australia. It served the gold-mining town of Homebush.

== History ==
The first section of line was opened in October 1874, as a 24 km (15 mi) branch from Maryborough to Avoca. It was extended to Ararat in November 1890. Once completed, it formed a 62.8 km (39.0 mi) through-route between two main lines. In 1888, the fares to Melbourne were 20 shillings and 13 shillings.

There was a Post Office at the Homebush station which opened in 1914 and was closed in 1919.

In July 1959, the line between Avoca and Ararat was closed. It was reopened in October 1966 and in 1996, it was converted to standard gauge, along with the main Melbourne–Adelaide railway. The Avoca–Ararat section of the line was unused for several years, and Pacific National used it to store over 100 surplus grain wagons, until many of them were reactivated to carry the 2011–2012 harvest.

The Avoca line reopened in 2018, following a complete rebuild as part of the Murray Basin Rail Project, which extended the reach of the standard gauge network in Victoria.

== See also ==
- Adelaide Lead, the railway
- Ararat railway station
- Ben Nevis railway station
- Bung Bong, Victoria
