= Navarre railway line =

Former railway line in Victoria, Australia

Overview
- Status: Closed
- Locale: Wimmera Southern Mallee
- Stations: 5

History
- Opened: 26 May 1914; 112 years ago
- Closed: 25 February 1954; 72 years ago

The Navarre railway line is an abandoned railway line in the Wimmera Southern Mallee region of the Australian state of Victoria. It branched off from Ben Nevis station on the Avoca line, running for 37 kilometres (23 miles) between Ben Nevis and Navarre.

Officially opened on 26 May 1914, the line included five stations: Crowlands, Joel, Landsborough, Tulkara and Navarre. Rolling stock, engines, drivers and repair crews were supplied from Ararat. When the service began, a train ran three times per week.

== History ==
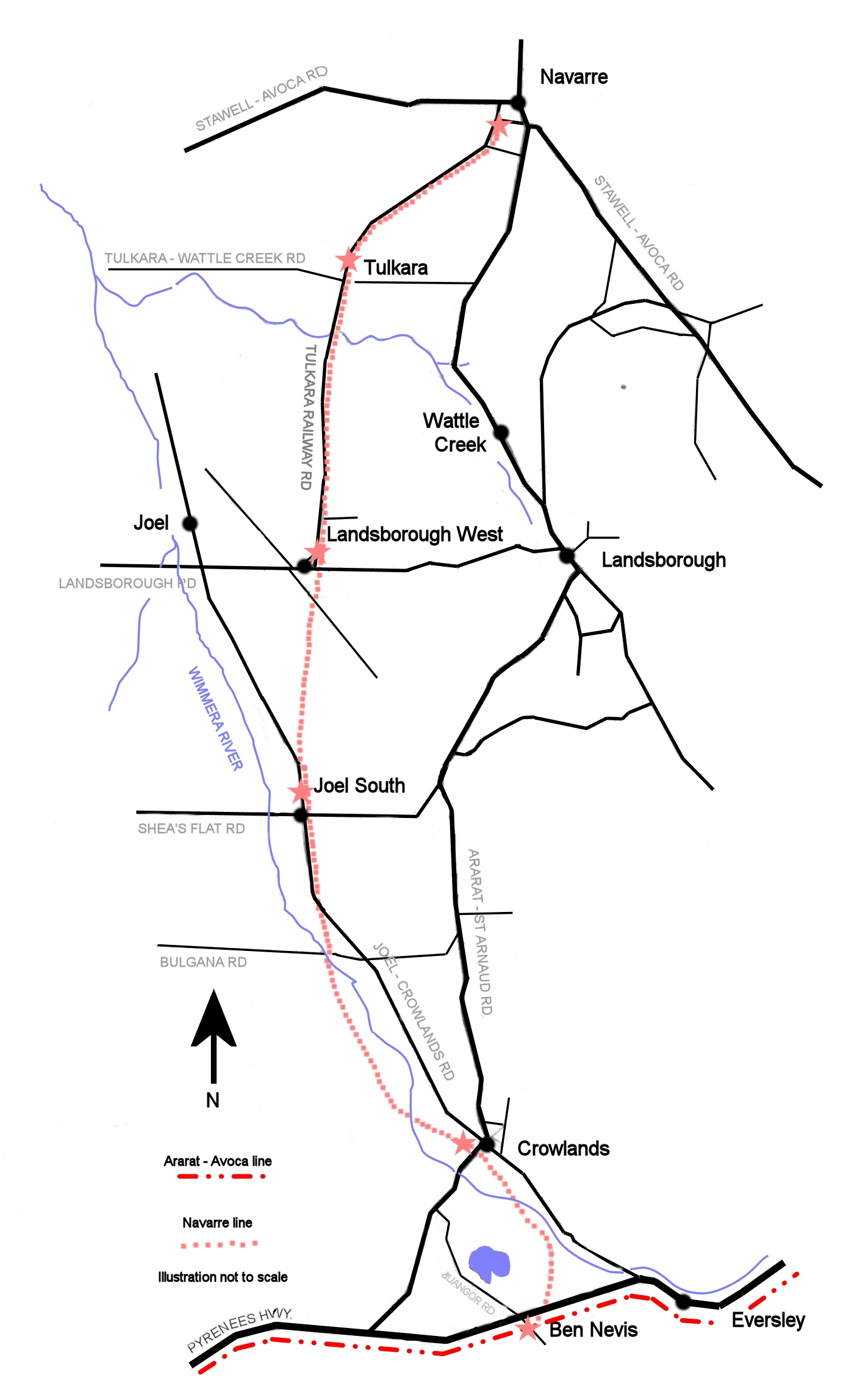
Map of the route of the Navarre line

In 1911, the Railways Standing Committee of the Victorian Parliament made the following recommendation.

"The Committee recommends the construction of a 5ft. 3in. railway from Crowland [sic] to Navarre, 21 miles 59 chains in length, as permanently surveyed, and terminating about 2¼ miles south-west of Navarre township, at an estimated cost of £74,735 with £1,485 added for rolling stock, as it considers that the line should be built with serviceable second-hand rails, and that the construction should not be entered upon until such rails are available."

The line was to connect with the Ararat - Avoca - Maryborough line at Ben Nevis (originally called Crowlands) and there was debate amongst the members of the Committee as to the exact location of the station at Navarre. At that early stage, they could see the possibility of the line being extended to the north to Marnoo and St Arnaud.

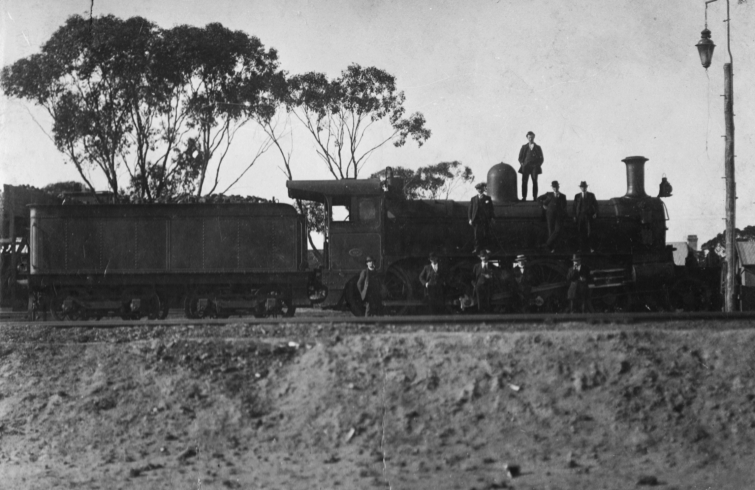
Railway employees and others posing with a Dd class locomotive, c.1920

The line ran through lightly undulating, partly wooded countryside for 36 kilometres. Gold had been found in the region during the 1850s, and many of those pioneers who had arrived there at that time remained to establish their own farms and businesses. Planning for the line began some years before its actual construction and changes in its route were to be inevitable. Originally, the line was expected to serve the expanding agricultural needs of the region, carrying livestock, wheat and chaff. Although the railway also operated a passenger service, one of the biggest users of the line were timber cutters and, for a while, six mills operated in the area, supplying firewood to Ararat, Ballarat and the capital, Melbourne.

From its opening in 1914, returns from the operation of the line were adequate to justify its existence. Within a short period of time, extra storage sheds were required at nearly all the stations to handle local produce on its way to market. However, by the late 1940s, with dwindling supplies of suitable timber, the advent of motorised transport and rising operating costs, it appeared more and more likely that the line would close if something couldn't be done quickly. To try to improve the situation, leading businessmen of the area, particularly from St Arnaud to the north, lobbied to have the line extended to pick up an increasing trade in grain.

== Closure of the line ==
Well before 1950, the Victorian Railways was already considering the future of the line. At a meeting of local businessmen in Landsborough, it was revealed that there had been a sharp move away from the use of firewood, which represented 90% of the line's traffic, to coal. That left the Railways with little option but to close the line. Demand continued to fall while running costs increased, and the goods-only service was reduced from once a week to once a fortnight by 1953. An advertisement in The Argus of 14 February 1954 gave notice of the closure of the line, with the last service to run on 25 February that year.

By 2010, little evidence of the railway remained, although aerial photographs clearly show sections of the right of way to the west and north-west of Landsborough, today located in the Pyrenees Shire. Some of the railway reserve not left to revert to nature was replaced with unsealed roads, such as the Tulkara - Navarre Road, some of which were later asphalted. Station sites, such as at Tulkara and Crowlands, remain as little more than mounds of earth by the roadside, with scattered remnants of sleepers and mounds of ballast the only clue as to what was there. The branch station at Ben Nevis, just 100 meters or so from the Pyrenees Highway, exists only as a couple of weather beaten railway crossing signs on a dirt road which crosses the Ararat to Avoca rail line. At Navarre, foundations of the old buildings, a goods loading ramp and weighbridge pit bore testament to the ideals locals had for the area.

== See also ==
- Avoca railway line
- List of closed railway stations in Victoria
