= Tulkara railway station =

Former railway station in Victoria, Australia

Coordinates: 36.94073°S 143.06212°E

Tulkara railway station is a closed railway station at Tulkara in the Shire of Northern Grampians in the Australian state of Victoria.

== History ==
Tulkara railway station was the 4th station on the Navarre railway line halfway between Navarre and Landsborough. In 1916 funds were made available for the addition of three weighbridges at Navarre, Tulkara and Wal Wal. Now closed, little remains of the station itself other than a mound of earth and a few scattered pieces of timber. The railway tracks, having been removed some time ago, were replaced in part with roads to service local farmers.

Preceding station	Disused railways	Following station
Landsborough	Navarre	Navarre
	List of closed railway stations in Victoria	
