= Crowlands, Victoria =

Crowlands
- Town
- Coordinates: 37°9′1″S 143°6′33″E
- Country: Australia
- State: Victoria
- LGAs: Pyrenees Shire; Northern Grampians Shire; Ararat Rural City
- Location: 24 km (15 mi) NE of Ararat

Government
  - State electorate: Ripon
  - Federal division: Wannon

Population
  - Total: 89 (2016 census)
- Postcode: 3377

Crowlands is a locality nestled on the Wimmera River and is located approximately 24 kilometres (15 mi) northeast of the town of Ararat, in the state of Victoria, Australia. It comprises a small village area of scattered houses and larger farms.

== History ==
=== Before European settlement ===
The traditional owners of the locality are the Dja Dja Wurrung or Jaara people who are part of the larger Kulin nation. The Jaara people suffered badly when gold was discovered and their population dropped dramatically as the Europeans converted more land to mining.

=== The early years ===
In 1836 Major Thomas Mitchell passed through the locality on his exploration of the Colony. During the 1840s European settlers began to move into the locality to establish sheep runs and harvest the nearby timber. Around this time the historic Woodlands Estate was established by Mr W J Clarke who selected some 180,000 acres. The original building and outbuildings, although much extended, still exist today. The property passed through successive owners and was gradually diminished in the size of its land holdings to around 53,000 acres in 1889 when it was purchased by William McCulloch. It remained in that families hands until 1937. The brick and granite buildings are considered historically and aesthetically significant.

As more people arrived the need for community services increased and so the township was formally surveyed in 1849. A Post Office was constructed there two years later followed by a Police Depot in 1854.

Gold was being worked successfully at Craigoir, the name given to the Pyrenees gold diggings, in the early 1850s and it was not long before thousands of prospectors flocked to the locality in search of fortune.

"The attention of the public has for these last six weeks been anxiously directed to this district in order to ascertain whether there was any truth in the rumours which since the discovery of the Bathurst gold field have been circulated as to the supposition of the presence of gold in the neighbourhood of the Pyrenees mountains. . . It is certain that as soon as this discovery is known, thousands will rush out to this country, and we may expect a constant and increasing stream of emigration."

The large influx of prospectors prompted the development of local business which included the establishment of the first public house, later called the Traveller's Rest Hotel. Many saw much promise in the locality and remained on as farmers or agricultural labourers.

=== The modern period ===
Up until the early 1900s the locality was predominantly used for sheep grazing as it was considered too costly to clear the open forest for the sowing of crops. Although considered good farming land it was not until much later that agriculture diversified to include wheat and other arable crops.

In 1914 the Navarre railway line was established to connect Crowlands and other nearby towns to the main line to the south which ran between Ararat and Avoca. The line closed in 1954.

Late in 2013 Pacific Hydro commenced construction of the Crowlands Wind Farm in the locality. After many years of negotiation with the local community it was decided that 39 wind turbines would be erected, each having a generating capacity of 2 megawatts.

== Facilities ==
The towns facilities include a large recreation reserve, Community Hall, Country Fire Authority shed, Church and a Bed and Breakfast facility. An historic walking trail was established in 2012 and the town has an active film appreciation group known as the Crowlands Film Society.

A number of wineries operate in the locality including the Dogrock Winery at Crowlands itself.

A single morning bus service operates from one stop near the old Crowlands Primary School to Ararat twice a week with a return journey mid afternoon.

To the north east of the township there is a large State Forest with a well maintained fauna and flora reserve and to the south is the Mount Cole Reservoir which is suitable for sightseeing.

There are tennis courts, a basketball court and a playground at the Crowlands Hall Playground.
