= Regional Network Development Plan =

The Regional Network Development Plan (RNDP) is a long-term plan for the provision of bus and train services to the regional areas of the state of Victoria, Australia. Produced four years after the Network Development Plan – Metropolitan Rail (NDPMR), which examined in detail the future expansion of the metropolitan Melbourne rail network, the RNDP was produced by the state government's Department of Economic Development, Jobs, Transport and Resources and sets forth short-, medium- and long-term priorities for the 5, 10 and 15 years after 2016 respectively.

The RNDP was widely criticised for its lack of concrete planning by regional commentators. Many of the plan's short-term proposals were funded in the 2016–17 Victorian Budget, and further regional public transport upgrades continued with the announcement of the Regional Rail Revival program in 2017.

== Background ==
Public Transport Victoria (PTV), a new statutory body replacing the former Director of Public Transport and Metlink as the coordinating authority of Victoria's public transport, was formed in December 2011 with the aim of improving services by better planning and stronger intermodal organisation. In March 2013, PTV released the NDPMR in partial fulfilment of these objectives, saying that it would be followed by similar plans for other modes of public transport by the end of that year. However, a report by the Victorian Auditor-General released in August 2014 found that the preparation of plans for "on-road public transport" (including the tram network and bus network) and regional services was "progressing slowly".

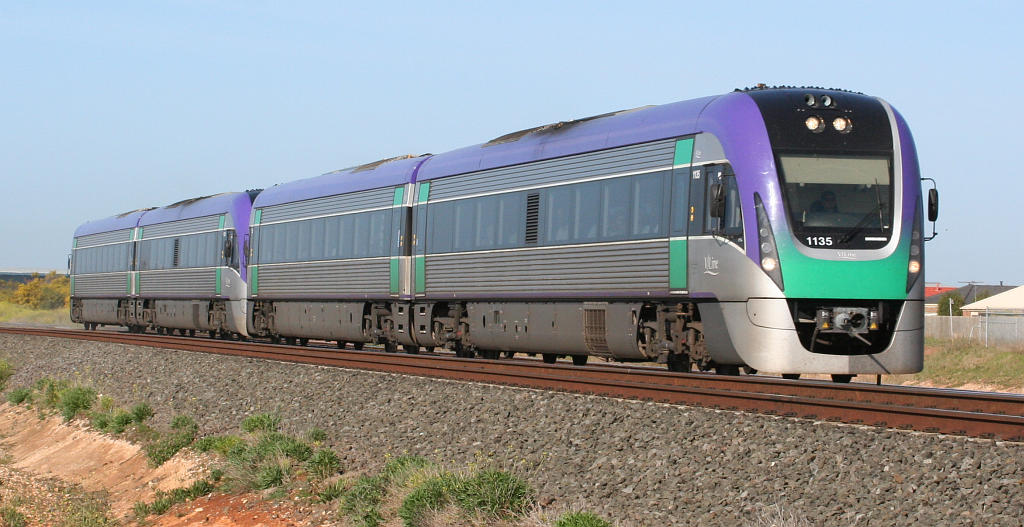
The introduction of VLocity trains had a substantial impact on regional public transport in the early 2000s.

Meanwhile, patronage on V/Line rail services had doubled in the previous decade, in part due to population growth and the increasing costs of car travel, but also as a result of the introduction of new VLocity trains which had substantially improved the comfort and reliability of commuter journeys to and from Melbourne. This unprecedented growth in demand for regional public transport resulted in capacity constraints becoming apparent on much of the V/Line network, limiting the provision of new services.

After public transport became a major issue at the 2014 Victorian election, the new Labor government led by Premier Daniel Andrews announced the commencement of public consultation for a Regional Network Development Plan in May 2015.

== Consultation and development ==
Public consultation meetings with the aim of establishing public transport priorities across the state began in June 2015. At the same time, an online forum was set up to facilitate comments on the state of transport services in regional Victoria.

The consultation process was led by a Regional Transport Advisory Group, co-chaired by Jaclyn Symes, a member of the Victorian Parliament's Legislative Council, and Richard Elkington, a member of the Gippsland Regional Development Committee. The group also included representative of planning and development bodies in the Wimmera region, Warrnambool, Bendigo, Wodonga, Shepparton and Ballarat; and a representative of the Transport Accident Commission.

38 "workshops" were held in various town centres during the consultation period, and were attended by about 1,400 people. In addition to this, approximately 1,700 surveys were returned in various formats, and 102 "detailed submissions" were made to the project by stakeholder groups.

The process received generally positive feedback in regional media outlets, with a number of established advocacy campaigns praising the opportunity for their demands to be discussed. The Ballarat Courier called the consultation a "solid start", but observed that significant investment would be required to realise any long-term benefits of the plan. The Weekly Times, a statewide newspaper with a rural focus, noted that it would be important for future planning to prioritise the needs identified in the consultation carefully.

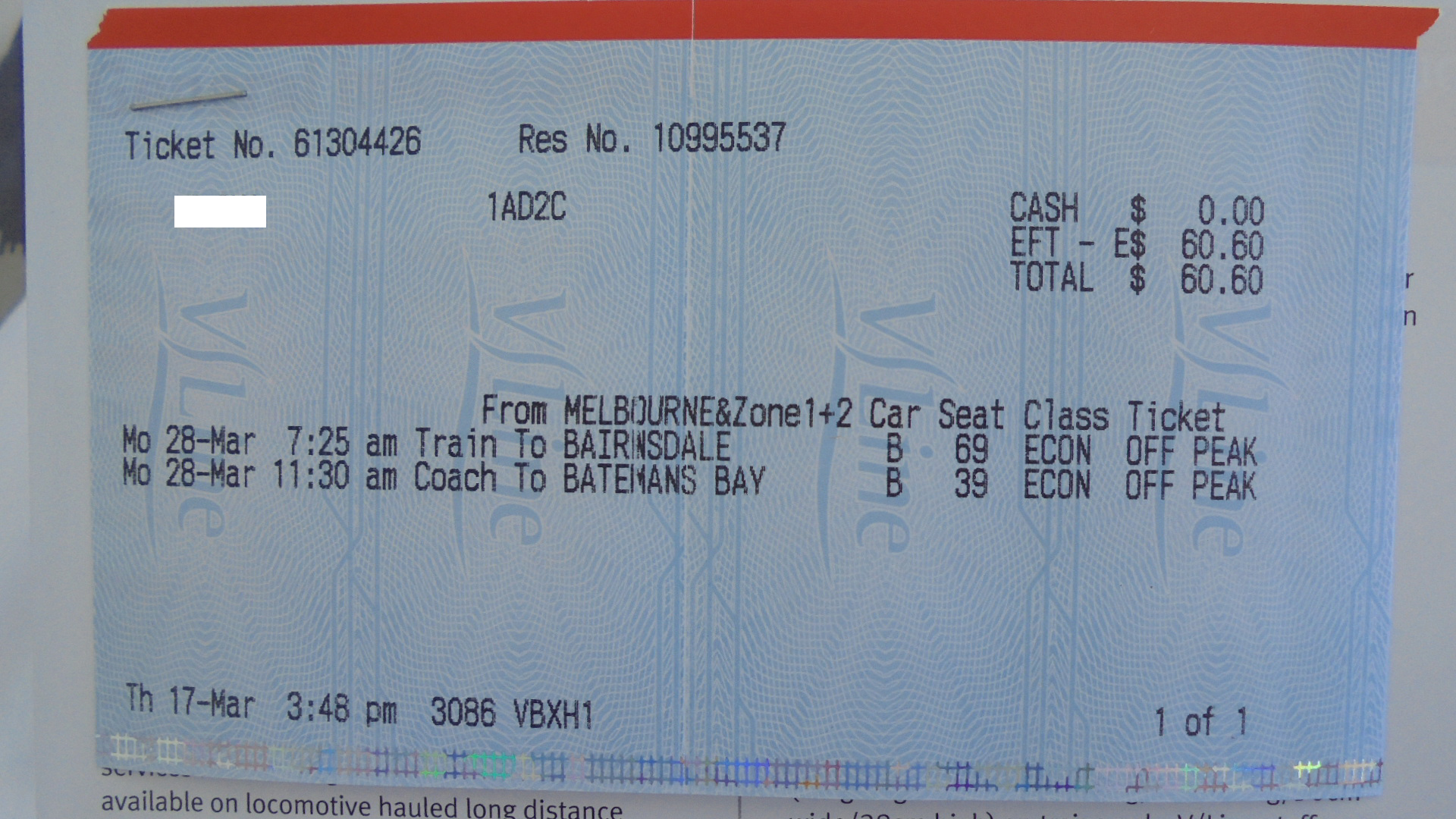
A source of frustration in the feedback received was the complex ticketing system combining myki and more traditional paper tickets such as this one.

The feedback channels closed on the same day as the final workshop, held in Maryborough on 9 October, and a "Conversation Report" summarising the feedback received was released on 26 November.

The Conversation Report summarised comments received in five regions: Gippsland, Grampians (extending from Ballarat to the western border of Victoria), Hume (the rough area served by the Hume Highway's Victorian section), Loddon Mallee (including most of northwest Victoria) and Barwon South West (approximately reflecting the catchment area of the Barwon River). Common themes of feedback across the state included the need for improved transport to smaller towns, a desire for higher-quality facilities and communication, and frustration at inflexible and inconsistent ticketing arrangements.

At the end of 2015, no release date for the plan had yet been announced. Minister for Public Transport Jacinta Allan told media that it would likely be ready for the 2016–17 Budget. By March 2016, the plan had been finalised and released to the government, but no timeframe was provided for its eventual public release. The RNDP was launched at a press conference on 30 May 2016, some weeks after the announcement of the Budget.

== Summary of proposals ==
The RNDP presents proposals under three "Strategic Priorities": "Building a better public transport network", "Putting passengers first", and "Developing local transport solutions." According to the introductory material of the plan, these priorities reflect the need for a "clearly defined" public transport network across modes and regions.

=== Building a better public transport network ===
This section of the plan focuses largely on upgrading and building upon the existing rail and long-distance coach networks. The plan specifies 2 further orders of VLocity trains, for a total of 48 further carriages, and the development of a "next generation" regional train to replace N type and H type carriages, particularly on long-haul routes. The RNDP also noted the ongoing requirement for further construction of stabling facilities, and sets a target of 20 minute service frequency for the commuter lines during peak times, and 40 minutes at other times.

Improvements to regional railway station infrastructure are also outlined in this section, along with concurrent improvements to interchange facilities. The RNDP also proposes the introduction of express coach connections to rail, and a network of orbital connections between towns.

Further, the RNDP suggests the introduction of myki ticketing across the rest of regional Victoria, and a review of existing fare structures to simplify ticket purchases. A small number of freight initiatives are also outlined, including the already-underway Murray Basin Rail Project and improvements to regulation of interstate traffic.

=== Putting passengers first ===
The second section of the RNDP is concerned largely with the improvement of comfort and accessibility for passengers. Among its proposals are standards for directional signage, the widespread introduction of real-time tracking of bus and train services and new passenger information display systems for buses and coaches. The requirement to upgrade transport facilities to comply with the Disability Discrimination Act is noted, and passenger comfort is addressed by the proposal of new cleaning facilities for buses and trains.

=== Developing local transport solutions ===
The last section of the plan's proposals addresses the need for new types of public transport in different regions. The RNDP includes programs to establish Local Transport Forums in various locations across the state, and envisages their participation in trials of new public transport solutions.

This section of the plan also deals with constraints on the existing network, suggesting the use of buses to provide extra capacity in peak times where rail capacity is not available, and introducing seasonal bus services for a variety of fluctuating transport requirements.

The RNDP also deals briefly with the need to encourage walking and cycling in regional areas, and to better orient the public transport network to tourism within Victoria.

== Reception ==
The plan received generally negative coverage on its release, particularly from regional newspapers. The Ballarat Courier identified the major shortfall of the RNDP as its lack of cost estimates or definite timeframes for most projects, and quoted the concerns of local politicians that it did not provide any guarantees of progress. The Border Mail, similarly, published the criticisms of the Border Rail Action Group which described the plan as a "bland handout" without any specific benefit to long-distance services such as those in the Albury/Wodonga area. The Latrobe Valley Express lamented the focus of the RNDP on "aspirations" rather than practical, short-term solutions to existing problems.

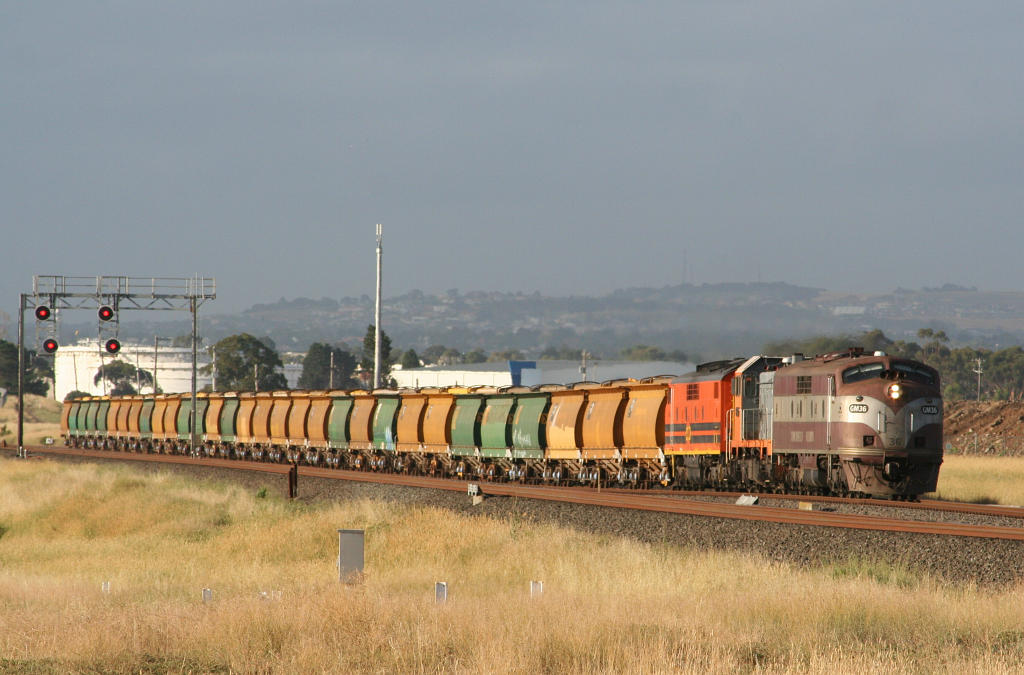
Rail freight, such as this interstate grain haulage, was identified as a potential beneficiary of the regional network's development.

Melbourne's Herald Sun, however, praised the plan for its focus on future commuter routes, while acknowledging the rapidly growing numbers of Victorians moving outside Melbourne. The Bendigo Advertiser also noted the benefits for commuters to Melbourne, as well as the potential for economic growth incentives provided by improvements to rail freight services and the enhanced intra-regional connectivity offered by improved bus services.

Two further high-profile transport planning documents were released by private groups in Victoria later in 2016. The first of these, produced by Consolidated Land and Rail Australia, focused on the construction of a high-speed train between Melbourne, Canberra and Sydney, but also included plans to improve intrastate transport along the train's route. The second plan, developed by the Rail Futures Institute, addressed the RNDP more explicitly in its public release. RFI president John Hearns, while announcing the InterCity plan, called the RNDP a "fairly political document" that was "not really a long-term plan". InterCity covers a 30-year timeframe and calls for a substantially higher level of investment in regional rail.

== Legacy ==
=== 2016–17 Budget ===
The published version of the RNDP included a summary of the initiatives funded by the 2016–17 Victorian Budget in accordance with the plan's recommendations. These included the purchase of a further 27 VLocity train carriages, the establishment of a "road and rail minor works fund" to finance improvements to interchange facilities in regional areas, and a number of additional off-peak rail services in the commuter regions.

The investment totalled $1.3 billion in budget estimates, and was largely perceived as a reaction to the major disruptions caused by wheel wear earlier that year. The investment in part duplication of the Ballarat line was also viewed as a precursor to eventual electrification of the commuter service to Melton.

=== Regional Rail Revival ===
The 2017–18 State Budget included further investment in regional railway services under the "Regional Rail Revival" (RRR) branding. The promised works extended to each of the passenger-carrying rail lines and included track duplication and signalling upgrades to increase capacity. The RRR was to be funded by funds from the Federal Government released after the lease of the Port of Melbourne, and was cast into doubt when the government of Prime Minister Malcolm Turnbull initially refused to back the proposal.

The Regional Rail Revival will be overseen and managed by the Melbourne Metro Rail Authority, and will commence with the Ballarat Line Upgrade. Major works are expected to commence in 2018.

== See also ==
- Operation Phoenix – 1950s rebuilding scheme for Victorian Railways
- New Deal – 1980s reorganisation of regional rail services
- Regional Fast Rail project – early 2000s infrastructure upgrade to regional lines

== Bibliography ==
- Connecting Regional Victoria: Victoria's Regional Network Development Plan (PDF). Department of Economic Development, Jobs, Transport and Resources. May 2016. ISBN 978-1-925466-81-2.
- Conversation Report. Regional Transport Advisory Group. November 2015.
- Coordinating Public Transport (PDF). Victorian Auditor-General's Office. August 2014.
