= Avoca railway station =

Former railway station in Victoria, Australia

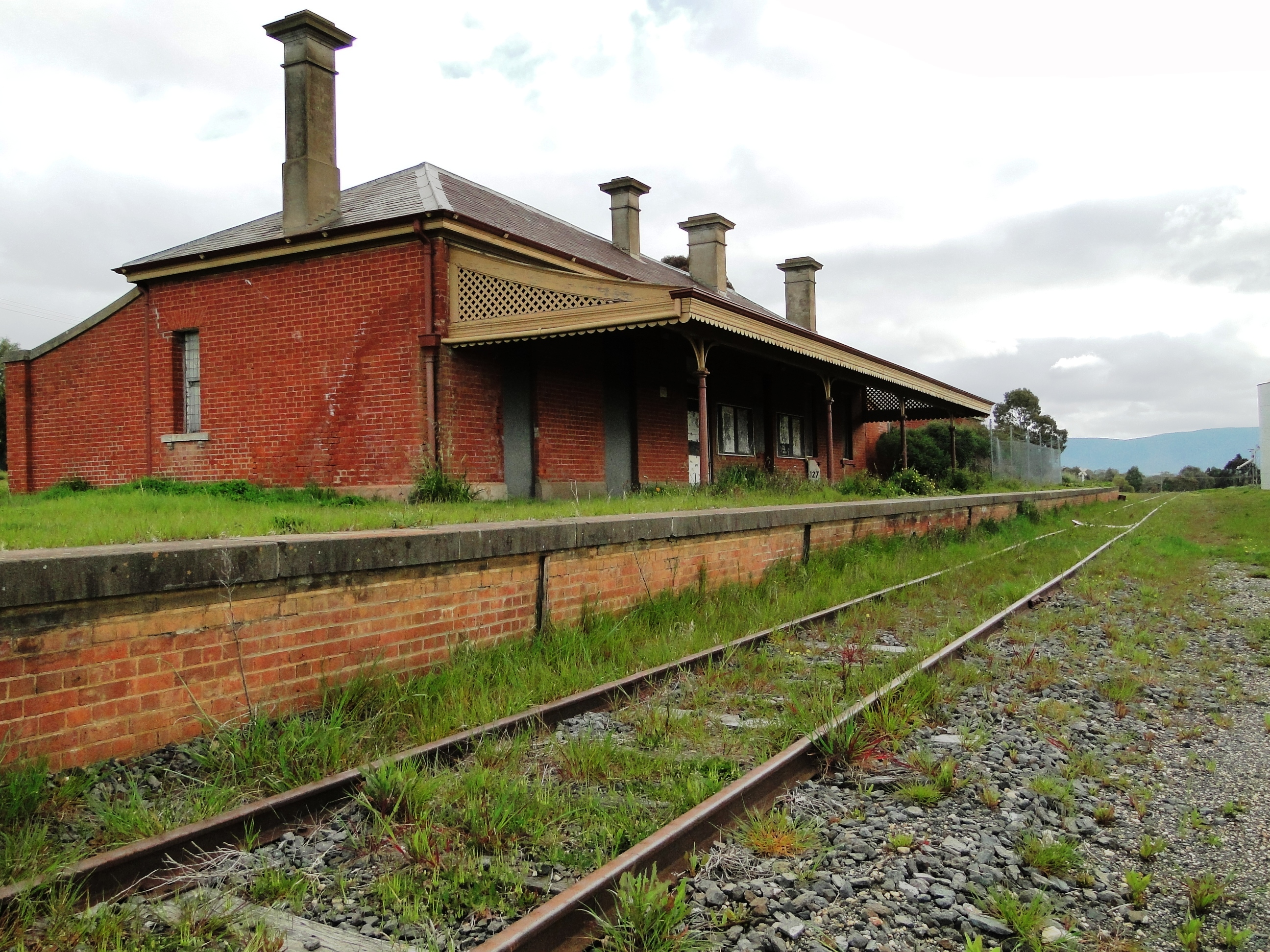
- Avoca station

General information
- Coordinates: 37°4′51.01″S 143°28′45.50″E
- Line: Maryborough to Ararat
- Platforms: 1
- Tracks: 1

Other information
- Status: Closed

History
- Opened: 1876
- Closed: 1979

Services
Preceding station	Disused railways	Following station
Homebush	Avoca	Elmhurst
	List of closed railway stations in Victoria	
Location

Avoca railway station is a railway station on the Avoca line in the town of Avoca, Victoria. It was first opened on Saturday, 21 October 1876 however was closed for gauge conversion on Friday, 14 April 1995. Again the railway was opened on Sunday, 28 April 1995, then the line was booked out of service on Friday, 21 January 2005. Although no longer in use, Avoca retains a brick station building, platform and goods shed.

In 2017, there was a proposal entitled the, Murray Basin rail project designed to link Mildura to Portland with standard gauge track to carry grain and mineral sands. This upgrading will include the Maryborough to Ararat section of the line, past the site of the disused Avoca station.

== Re-opening ==
The Maryborough to Ararat rail freight line was officially re-opened at Avoca early in 2018 after more than 13 years of siting idle.

== See also ==
- Ararat railway station
- Avoca railway line
- Homebush railway station, Victoria
