= Murray Basin Rail Project =

Railway project in the north-west of Victoria, Australia

The Murray Basin Rail Project is a major railway project in the north-west of Victoria, Australia. The project includes the conversion of a substantial portion of the Victorian freight rail network from the historical broad gauge to the standard gauge used in other parts of Australia, and the upgrading of track to enable higher axle loads for more efficient intrastate freight transfer.

The project is part of the Regional Rail Revival program and is being delivered by V/Line in its role as infrastructure manager of the Victorian rail network, under the direction of Public Transport Victoria. The project is jointly funded by the Victorian and Australian governments. Construction commenced in 2016 and was supposed to be completed by late 2018, but financial issues delayed its completion until 2023.

== Background ==
Prior to Federation in 1901, the colonial governments of Victoria, New South Wales, South Australia, and the other Australian colonies were responsible for development of railway networks surrounding their nascent capital cities. Due to political pressures and disagreements over the technical advantages of various track specifications, several different gauges were adopted. In particular, Victoria adopted the 1,600 mm (5 ft 3 in) Victorian broad gauge, New South Wales 4 ft 8 1/2 in (1,435 mm) standard gauge and South Australia a combination of broad gauge and 3 ft 6 in (1,067 mm) narrow gauge.

Following a Royal Commission in 1921 which recommended the adoption of standard gauge across the country, the first Victorian line to be converted was the North East line in 1962 between Melbourne and Albury, eliminating the interstate break of gauge and allowing trains to run between Sydney and Melbourne for the first time. Then, in 1995, the Melbourne–Adelaide railway was standardised, meaning that all capital cities were linked by a single gauge for the first time in Australia's history. Over the following years, new private rail freight operators invested in new interstate services due to the reduced running costs of a single-gauge network.

In May 2001, the state government under Premier Steve Bracks promised the standardisation of 13 freight lines, incorporating some 2,000 km (1,200 mi) of track. The rationale offered for the Rail Gauge Standardisation Project was that it would reduce freight costs, improve rail's mode share for intrastate freight, and improve competition between ports. However, the private lessees of the freight network over the following years, Freight Australia and its successor Pacific National, failed to commit to the project, and by 2005, it was largely abandoned. The government announced in May 2007 that the entire state's network would be bought back from Pacific National, with its ownership moving to VicTrack and management responsibility passing to V/Line. Industry groups expressed hope that the purchase would enable upgrade works to proceed on the north-west rail network.

By 2014, approximately 2 million metric tons (2,000,000 long tons) of grain was exported from the Murray Basin annually, in addition to 1,000,000–1,500,000 t (980,000–1,480,000 long tons) of mineral sands and around 13,000 containers of other produce.

In the May prior to the 2014 Victorian election, the Liberal government of Premier Denis Napthine announced the Murray Basin Rail Project, including the standardisation of most rail lines in the state's north-west. The announcement included future plans for the extension of the Piangil railway line to join the East-west rail corridor near Mildura and the return of passenger services to Mildura; some days later, government ministers downplayed the potential for passenger rail following the upgrade. The government expected that the MBRP would be partially financed by the sale of the Rural Finance Corporation, a state-backed investment bank, to Bendigo and Adelaide Bank.

After the election, in August 2015, the new Labor government of Premier Daniel Andrews announced that they would recommit to the MBRP, with a particular focus on freight, at a cost of $416 million. The Commonwealth government was initially reluctant to fund the project, as it related to track not managed by the federally-owned Australian Rail Track Corporation, but committed to a contribution of half the project cost in April 2016.

== Scope of works ==
The two main elements of the MBRP are the expansion of the Victorian standard gauge network, and the improvement of line capacity via increased axle loads, both of which are intended to facilitate more efficient intrastate rail connections. The rationale for the project is centred on improved access to the Victorian ports of Portland, Geelong and Melbourne, and encouraging freight users such as Iluka Resources at Hamilton to retain access to the Victorian network rather than economising with existing standard gauge connections.

However, the predominantly broad-gauge passenger network centred on Melbourne's Southern Cross railway station complicates the total standardisation of the rail network. The MBRP includes several sections of dual gauge rail enabling access for both broad- and standard-gauge services.

The Mildura, Sea Lake, Manangatang and Murrayville lines will be fully gauge converted between Maryborough and their respective termini. Further, the defunct standard gauge link between Ararat and Maryborough will be repaired and reopened to traffic. The entire length of the Geelong–Ballarat railway line and the Mildura line between Maryborough and Ballarat will be converted to dual gauge to facilitate standard-gauge access to the Port of Geelong.

In addition to the standardisation, maximum axle loads on all lines will be increased to at least 21 t (21 long tons), with the exception of the Murrayville line, which will be upgraded to a 19 t (19 long tons) axle load. According to the project documentation, this will result in an increase in the payload per train of some 300–400 t (300–390 long tons).

== Construction timeline ==
=== Stage 1 ===
Stage 1 works commenced in February 2015, consisting of sleeper replacement and regular maintenance on the Mildura line. Structures such as bridges and culverts were inspected, and rail was continuously welded to increase the speed limit on the track section to 80 km/h (50 mph).

175,000 concrete sleepers and 3,400 m (11,200 ft) of new rail were laid during stage 1. Minister for Public Transport Jacinta Allan announced its completion on 5 September 2016.

=== Stage 2 ===
McConnell Dowell and Martinus Rail were announced as contractors for stages 2, 3 and 4 of the project on 26 June 2017. The contractors established a project office in Maryborough for the duration of their works. The Mildura and Murrayville lines closed north of Dunolly on 7 August for standardisation work to commence, with the Sea Lake and Manangatang lines remaining open for broad gauge grain traffic. The scope of stage 2 also included the reopening of the Maryborough–Ararat line.

On 23 October 2017, a worker on the project was killed after being crushed between a roller and trailer while loading the trailer near Mildura. The Rail Tram & Bus Union and Construction, Forestry, Mining and Energy Union accused V/Line and its contractors of unsafe work practices on the project; V/Line denied the allegations and the state government announced a full coronial inquiry into the death.

Test trains on the Maryborough–Ararat section began running towards the end of November 2017. Towards the conclusion of Stage 2 works in mid-January 2018, warnings to motorists of the imminent rail traffic were placed on roads crossing the Maryborough–Ararat line. 35 level crossings on the newly reopened line were provided with boom gates to protect road traffic. On 29 January 2018, an official ceremony was held to reopen the line, with a single 830 class locomotive running past state and federal representatives near Avoca.

With the Ararat–Maryborough line open, work continued on the Mildura standardisation, but the originally announced opening date of January 2018 was delayed because of hot weather and fire danger restricting the use of welding and grinding equipment.

A gradual reopening for the Mildura line began on 14 February 2018, with the first trains running to Birchip. This was followed by Pacific National's Fruit Flyer running to Merbein on 22 February 2018. The same train returned with its load to the Port of Melbourne, in the process also becoming the first commercial train to operate over the Ararat–Maryborough section since its restoration.

=== Further stages ===
Stage 3 was to include the standardisation of the Sea Lake and Manangatang lines, and was intended to commence in 2018 when stage 2 works were complete and the Mildura line had reopened to traffic. Stage 4 works were to encompass the conversion of the Geelong–Ballarat line in its entirety to dual gauge, while Stage 5 would have involved the conversion of the Maryborough line to dual gauge north of Ballarat.

However, in June 2018, state opposition parties claimed that work had ceased on the project entirely. In response, the government announced that V/Line was reconsidering the staging of the project following feedback from freight rail operators. Later that month, The Weekly Times reported that the project had encountered serious issues, including poor-quality construction on the Ararat–Maryborough and Mildura lines, and, as a result, the state government had asked the newly formed Rail Projects Victoria (RPV) to take over delivery from V/Line and was attempting to end the contract with McConnell Dowell Martinus. However, the government denied the reports, claiming instead that V/Line had taken over management of the works from the contractor and would co-operate with RPV. At the end of June 2018, severe speed restrictions continued to be imposed on the Ararat–Maryborough line, and the lack of a connection at Ararat to the interstate mainline to the south was severely limiting the capacity of the junction.

The state government announced a new package of works, described as the Freight–Passenger Rail Separation Project (FPRSP), to augment the remaining stages of the MBRP at an additional cost of $130 million. The major components of the FPRSP revealed included augmentation of tracks at Ballarat and improved segregation of freight and passenger tracks through the station precinct, as well as the conversion of the Ballarat–Maryborough line to dual gauge originally described as Stage 4 of the MBRP.

A review of the original MBRP business case was undertaken in 2020 and a revised business case was developed. The standardisation of the Manangatang and Sea Lake lines was dropped from the scope. Victorian Minister for Transport Infrastructure Jacinta Allan claimed that standardisation "would create a bottleneck at Ballarat".

During the October 2020 federal budget, the federal government did not allocate further funding for the project, arguing it had already provided $240 million of funding since the start of the project in 2016. However, in December 2020, the federal government announced a new funding of $200 million onto the project. The project resumed in February 2021, beginning with sleeper replacement works between Korong Vale and Sea Lake. The resumed project was expected to be completed in late 2023.

== Reception and analysis ==
The project was largely welcomed by regional communities and the agriculture and resources industries. The Victorian Farmers Federation (VFF) called the MBRP a solution to the "foolish" break of gauge situation and suggested that the conversion had the potential to encourage further rail investment from grain producers and transporters. Wakefield Transport, one such operator, noted that the project in totality would enable a round trip to be completed from grain producing regions to the Port of Geelong in less than 24 hours, substantially decreasing transport costs. On this basis, Infrastructure Australia's review of the business case for the MBRP in early 2017 found that the project would likely deliver economic benefits in excess of its costs.

The 2016–17 grain harvest season saw a 70% increase in rail traffic year-on-year, which V/Line CEO James Pinder attributed to the increased capacity provided by stage 1 of the project. The VFF subsequently criticised the lack of progress on the remainder of the project.

However, the Central Goldfields Shire Council expressed concern that the dual gauge section between Ballarat and Maryborough would adversely affect the existing passenger service, noting that the dual gauge setup would impose a speed restriction on the broad gauge passenger traffic.

== See also ==
- Regional Network Development Plan – a 2016 document including strategic priorities for Victorian freight rail.
