= Melbourne Metro 2 =

Proposed extension to the Melbourne railway network

Diagram showing Melbourne's rail network, including former lines, lines under construction and proposed lines.

Melbourne Metro 2 (MM2 for short, also known informally as Metro Tunnel 2 or Metro 2) is a proposed underground rail project in Melbourne, Victoria, Australia. It involves constructing new rail tunnels from Newport to Clifton Hill via the city centre. Conceived as a follow-up project to the Metro Tunnel (MM1), MM2 would link the Werribee line, and possibly also the Geelong line, in Melbourne's south-west to the Mernda line in Melbourne's north-east.

Likely to be split into two stages due to the project's large size and cost, the first (western) stage would include a new interchange at Newport, followed by two new stations in the Fishermans Bend development precinct and a new interchange at Southern Cross. A second (eastern) stage would extend to new interchanges at Flagstaff and Parkville, followed by a new station in Carlton or Fitzroy and a new interchange at Clifton Hill.

Although MM2 has been proposed and refined by a number of government-led and independent reports and proposals, no funding or policy commitment to its construction is in place as of 2026.

== History ==
=== 2008–2014: Early concepts ===
The first Metro Tunnel proposal gradually emerged in detail after the 2008 Eddington Report, which identified a new rail tunnel creating an end-to-end line from west to east through the city centre as a major priority for transport investment in Melbourne. In the period between 2008, when the tunnel was first envisaged, and 2016, when construction began, the Metro Tunnel underwent several changes to its scope and proposed delivery, including the combination of what was originally envisaged as a two-stage project into a single-stage construction.

During this period, the Public Transport Development Authority, trading as Public Transport Victoria (PTV), was established under the state government of Ted Baillieu to coordinate planning for Victoria's public transport services. In 2013, PTV released its Network Development Plan – Metropolitan Rail (NDPMR), which presented a 20-year plan in four stages to improve the suburban rail system. The projects suggested by the NDMPR focused both on increasing the capacity of the central rail system and extending the network's reach to serve the growing outer suburbs of Melbourne. To achieve this goal, PTV argued it would be necessary to invest in major infrastructure, starting with the Metro Tunnel, to segregate railway lines on their journey through the city, to maximise the connectivity of the system and minimise the possibility of disruption.

Among the projects envisaged for Stage 3 – the five-year period after the completion of the Metro Tunnel – was the creation of another end-to-end line with a tunnel from Clifton Hill to Southern Cross. The NDPMR suggested that the tunnel would provide the additional capacity needed to serve the booming patronage on the South Morang (now Mernda) line, as well as providing additional space in the existing Clifton Hill tunnel of the City Loop so that a new line to Doncaster could be accommodated alongside Mernda line services. The NDPMR also recommended that the tunnel be extended in Stage 4 from Southern Cross to a new station at Fishermans Bend, with a view to further expansion to Newport and the Werribee line.

=== 2014–present: Further planning and provisions ===
Interactive map of the 2024 proposed route of the tunnel

By 2015, with planning work for the first Metro Tunnel underway, the Herald Sun began referring to the second tunnel as "Metro 2", as the state government confirmed that the new Parkville station would be designed with provision for future expansion to an interchange. At the same time, the newspaper reported that the state government of premier Daniel Andrews was broadly supportive of the need for a second major rail project at the completion of the Metro Tunnel.

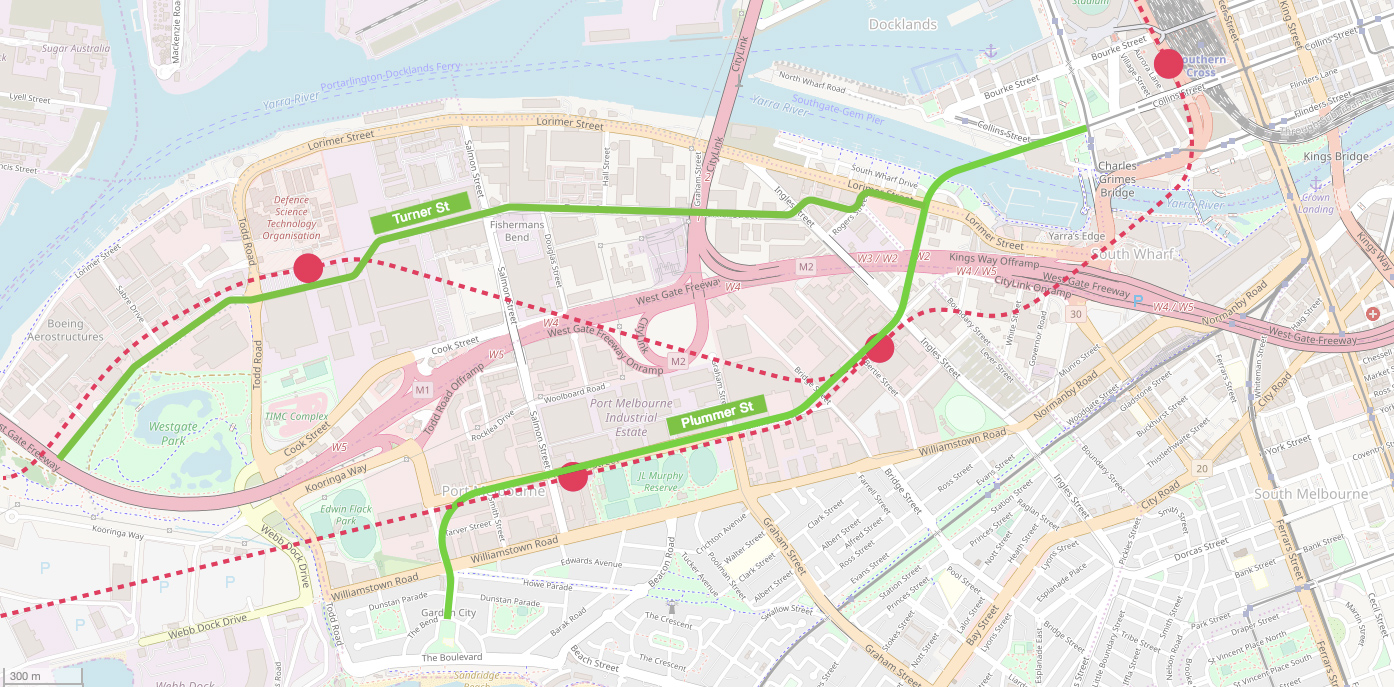
Map showing proposed tram extensions to Fishermans Bend, and the two alternative paths for the western section of the Melbourne Metro 2 tunnel proposed in the State Government's 2018 Fishermans Bend Framework plan.

Then, in October 2016, the inaugural 30-year plan released by the independent infrastructure advisory agency Infrastructure Victoria suggested that the entire project – from Newport to Clifton Hill – needed to be constructed simultaneously, but would have enormous costs potentially not offset by its benefits. The report recommended a reconfiguration of the City Loop as an earlier and cheaper measure to improve core capacity in the network, but stated that any redesign of MM2 would need to consider delivering further improvements to the lines through Sunshine after completion of the first Metro Tunnel. On the other hand, the report also suggested that the massive improvements in property values created by MM2, which it estimated as being up to $20 billion, could be used to partially fund the project using a value capture levy or tax.

After the Andrews government announced an expanded West Gate Tunnel project in 2017, in an attempt to improve transport links from the western suburbs, public transport advocates cited MM2 as a more sustainable alternative to the massive road tunnel. The MM2 project again received attention in December of that year, when the University of Melbourne announced plans to build a new campus for its Melbourne School of Engineering at Fishermans Bend. Although the state government suggested an extension of the tram network could be built to serve the facility, treasurer Tim Pallas admitted that a heavy rail line through the area was unlikely to proceed in the near future. At the same time, however, he mentioned that a "Metro 3" project was also possible, but did not provide any detail on the plan.

A report by Melbourne City Council in early 2018 stated its support for the entire MM2 project, and urged the state government to begin planning as soon as possible. It also suggested that Melbourne Metro 3 could be an entirely new line, combining a Melbourne Airport rail link and Doncaster line via a new tunnel in the central city connecting with existing stations. Then, at the end of May, a report commissioned by Infrastructure Victoria and produced by engineering consultants Arup found that MM2 would be more beneficial to the city than either of the two road projects being promoted ahead of the state election in November. The analysis suggested that MM2 would have a transformative impact on road congestion and consequently on the efficient transport of freight, but would be unlikely to ever produce a positive cost-benefit ratio using traditional methodology. The report attributed this in part to the enormous capital cost of the project, which it estimated at $20.3 billion.

In August 2018, plans released for the state government's Suburban Rail Loop included demand modelling maps depicting MM2 as a component of the city's future rail network. However, the government refused to immediately commit to the tunnel as part of its election platform. The opposition expressed in-principle support for the project but also refrained from promising its implementation. The Framework plan for Fishermans Bend, released in 2018 by the State Government, showed two route options for the western section of the tunnel between Southern Cross station and Newport station. One option includes a station in the proposed Employment Precinct, near the future University of Melbourne Engineering campus, while the southern option included a station in the proposed residential district of Wirraway on Plummer St.

A leaked long-term plan produced by Transport for Victoria also included the tunnel, and suggested that the western section should be built first, followed by the originally proposed eastern section. In 2021, the tunnel was fully supported by Infrastructure Victoria and was included in its 30-year infrastructure plan for Victoria, with the agency describing it as a "city shaping project that will provide a significant uplift in rail services, relieve future pressure on the public transport network, improve access to jobs and services and provide urban renewal opportunities in key precincts".

In 2024, the Allan government committed to revised locations for the two proposed Fishermans Bend stations, and an additional proposed station serving the Docklands area.

== Proposed operations ==
The Stage 4 service plan in the 2012 NDPMR suggested that the tunnel – terminating at Fishermans Bend – would carry 15 trains an hour in peak times, most running the full length of the line from Mernda and Hurstbridge. However, no service plan has been publicly released for the longer tunnel to Newport as of 2018.

== See also ==
- Elizabeth line
- Sydney Metro

== Bibliography ==
- Network Development Plan Metropolitan Rail (PDF). Melbourne: Public Transport Victoria. December 2012.
