= Parkville railway station =

Railway station in Victoria, Australia

Parkville
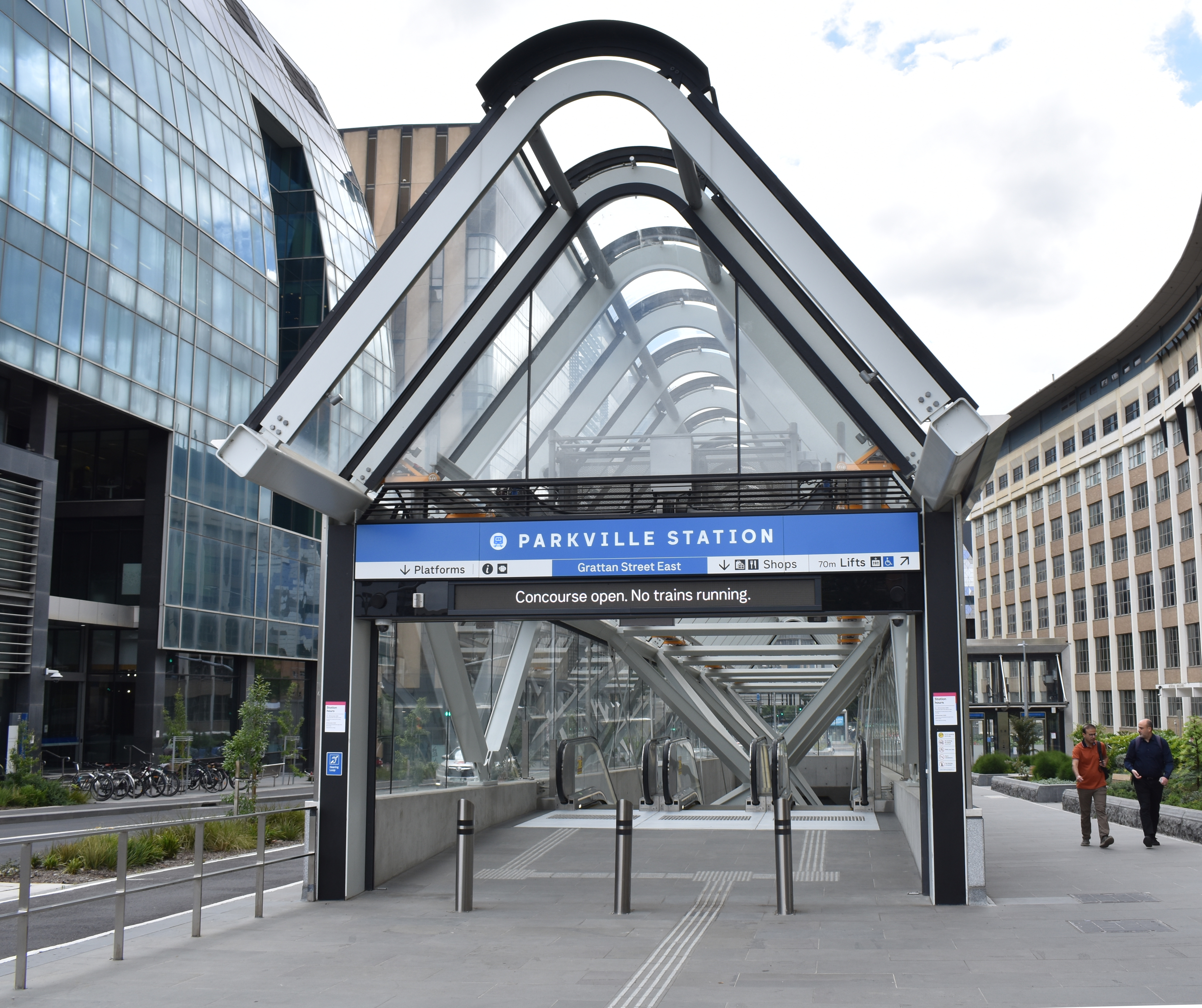
- Parkville station entrance, November 2025

General information
- Location: Grattan Street, Parkville, Victoria 3052; City of Melbourne; Australia
- Coordinates: 37.7998872°S 144.9591705°E
- System: PTV commuter rail station
- Owner: VicTrack
- Operator: Metro Trains
- Line: Sunbury
- Distance: 8.08 kilometres from Southern Cross
- Platforms: 2
- Tracks: 2
- Connections: Tram; Bus

Construction
- Structure type: Underground
- Cycle facilities: 250
- Accessible: Yes—step free access

Other information
- Status: Operational, premium station
- Station code: PKV
- Fare zone: Myki zone 1
- Website: Public Transport Victoria

History
- Opened: 30 November 2025; 11 months ago
- Electrified: Yes (1500 V DC overhead)

Services
| Preceding station | Metro Trains | Following station |
|---|---|---|
| State Library towards Cranbourne or East Pakenham via Metro Tunnel | Sunbury line | Arden towards Watergardens or Sunbury |
Track layout
Location

Parkville railway station is an underground railway station operated by Metro Trains Melbourne on the Sunbury line, part of the Melbourne rail network. It serves the inner-northern Melbourne suburb of Parkville and the University of Melbourne in Victoria, Australia.

Opened as part of the Metro Tunnel project, Parkville is an underground premium station, featuring an island platform with two platforms. Major construction commenced in April 2018, and was completed in May 2024. The station concourse opened on 24 November 2025, with train operations beginning on 30 November 2025, along with the rest of the Metro Tunnel.

Parkville has been built below Grattan Street, between Leicester and Elizabeth streets, using the cut-and-cover method. The station serves the extensive medical, health, and education precinct in the Melbourne suburb of Parkville, encompassing the University of Melbourne, the University High School, the Royal Melbourne Hospital, the Royal Women's Hospital, the Peter MacCallum Cancer Centre and WEHI.

The station connects Parkville to the metropolitan train network for the first time. Provisions have been made in the station design to allow for construction of the proposed Metro Tunnel 2, enabling an interchange between the two lines.

== Design ==
The station was designed by RSHP, Hassell and Weston Williamson, and construction materials feature sandstone, steel, glass and bluestone.

There are four entrances, two serving the University of Melbourne, one outside the Royal Melbourne Hospital, and the other in front of the Peter MacCallum Cancer Centre. An underground walkway connects the entrances and four sets of lifts underneath Royal Parade, while the main station concourse lies beneath Grattan Street. The main entrance features a 50-metre-long steel and glass canopy, and a number of skylights provide natural light to the station concourse, which is clad on one side with green aluminium. Like other Metro Tunnel stations, exposed concrete is a key design element.

The station concourse features an artwork by Patricia Piccinini titled Vernal Glade, which consists of a large array of handmade Japanese ceramic tiles in natural colours.

== Parkville precinct ==
Parkville station is intended to become a "grand promenade" to connect the area's health, research and education buildings. A new tram "super stop" has been provided on Royal Parade, along with realigned traffic lanes, bicycle lanes, bus stops, footpaths and pedestrian crossings. More than 250 bicycle parking spaces have been provided.

== Station layout ==
| S | Street level | Entrances/Exits |
| B1 | | Staff only |
| C | Concourse | Customer service, retail, Royal Parade underpass |
| B3 | | Staff only |
| P platforms | Platform 1 | Sunbury line towards Sunbury (Arden) → |
| P platforms | Island platform, doors will open on the right |
| P platforms | Platform 2 | ← Sunbury line towards East Pakenham or Cranbourne (State Library) |

== Transport links ==
Yarra Trams operates 3 services via Parkville Station on Royal Parade and Flemington Road

Royal Parade:

- : North Coburg – Flinders Street Station

Flemington Road:

- : West Coburg – Toorak
- : Airport West – Flinders Street Station

Kinetic Melbourne operates two bus routes via Parkville Station, under contract to Public Transport Victoria:

- 505 : Moonee Ponds – Melbourne University (Note: Route 505 services continue to/from Heidelberg Station as route 546.)
- 546 : Heidelberg Station – Melbourne University (Note: Route 546 services continue to/from Moonee Ponds Junction as route 505.)

Transit Systems Victoria operates two routes via Parkville Station, under contract to Public Transport Victoria:

- 241 : North Melbourne Station – Yarra Bend Park
- 402 : Footscray Station – East Melbourne

== Gallery ==
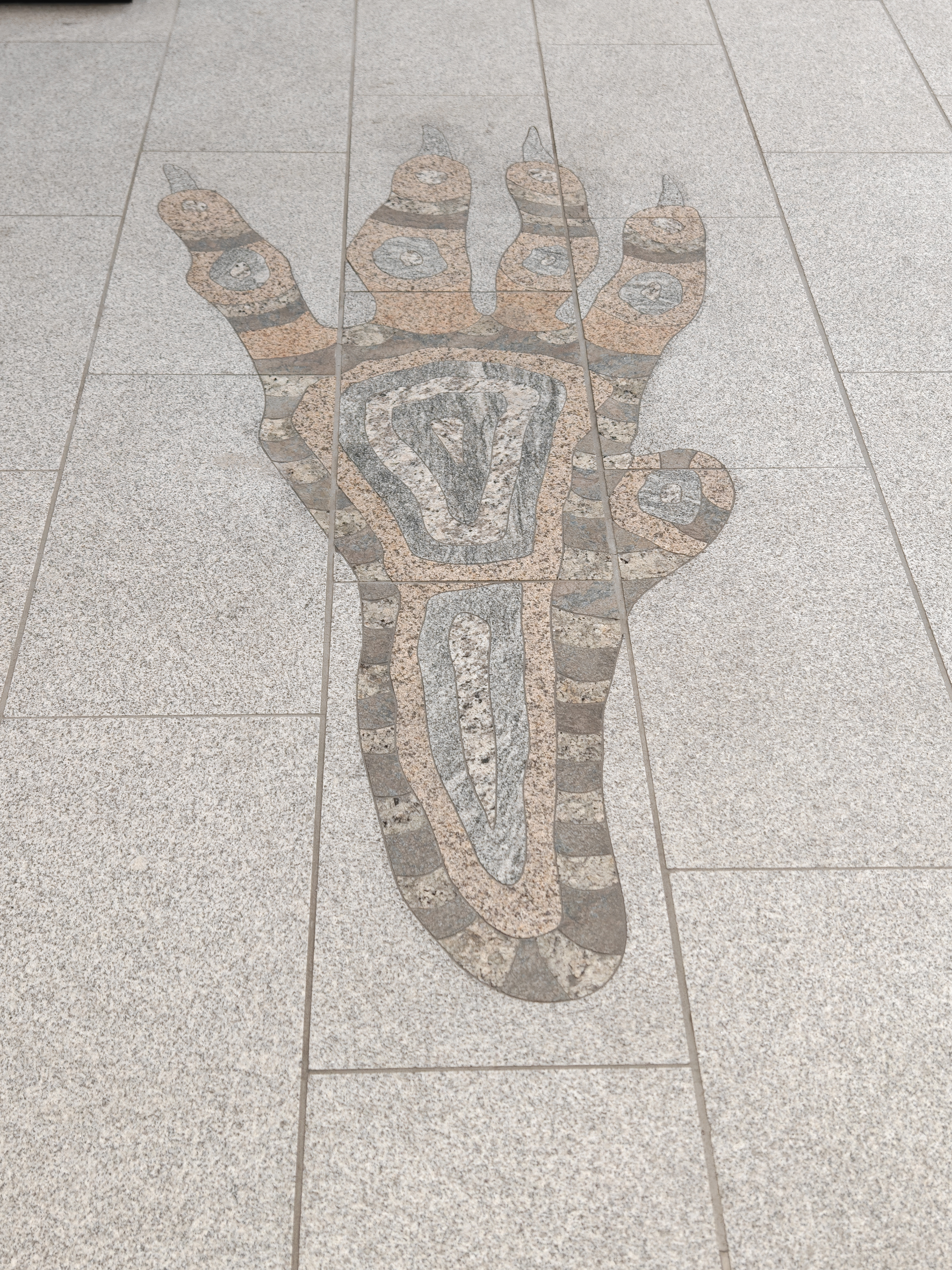
Track Work Artwork; Parkville Station

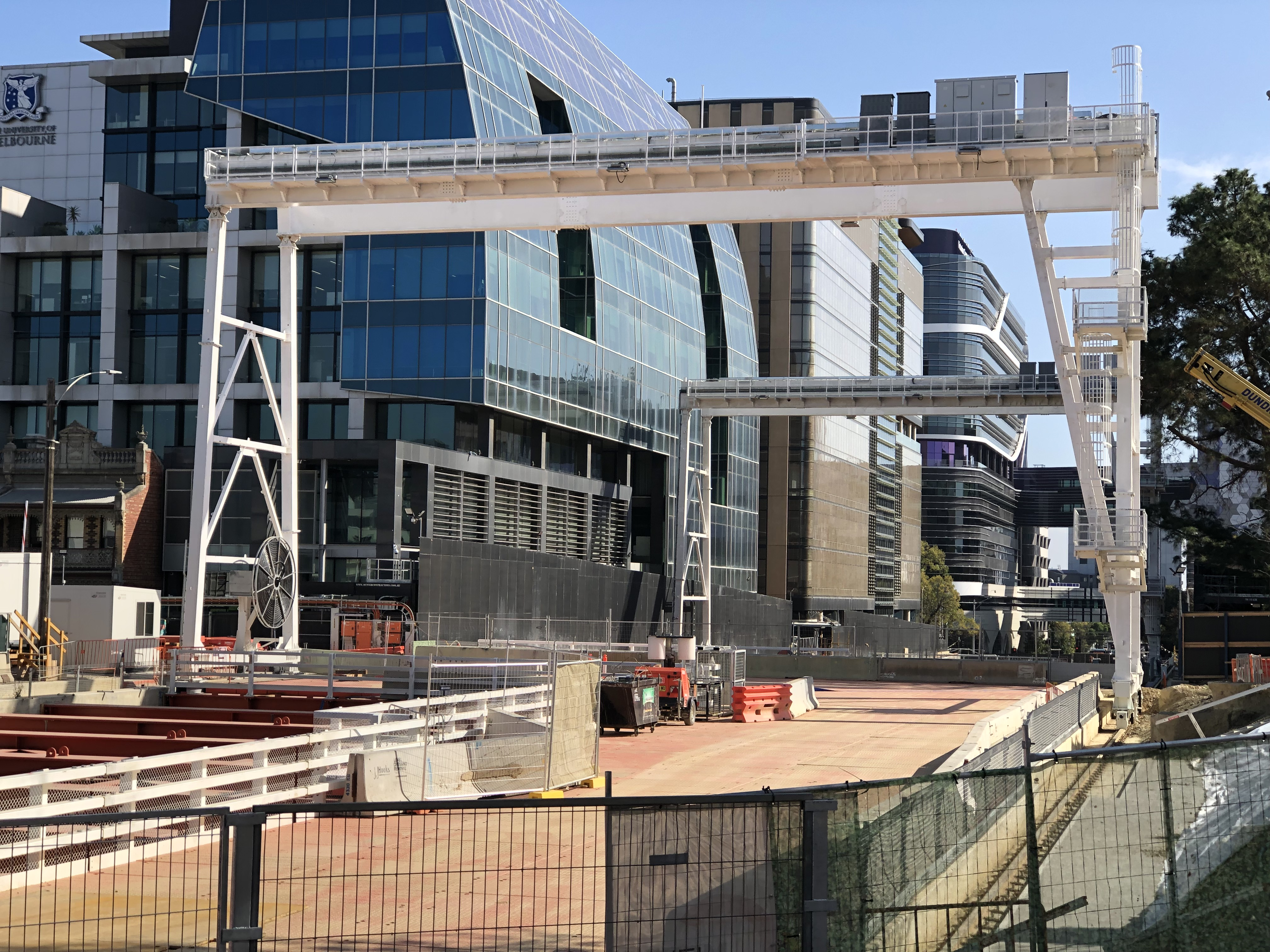
Parkville station under construction, looking west towards Royal Parade, April 2019

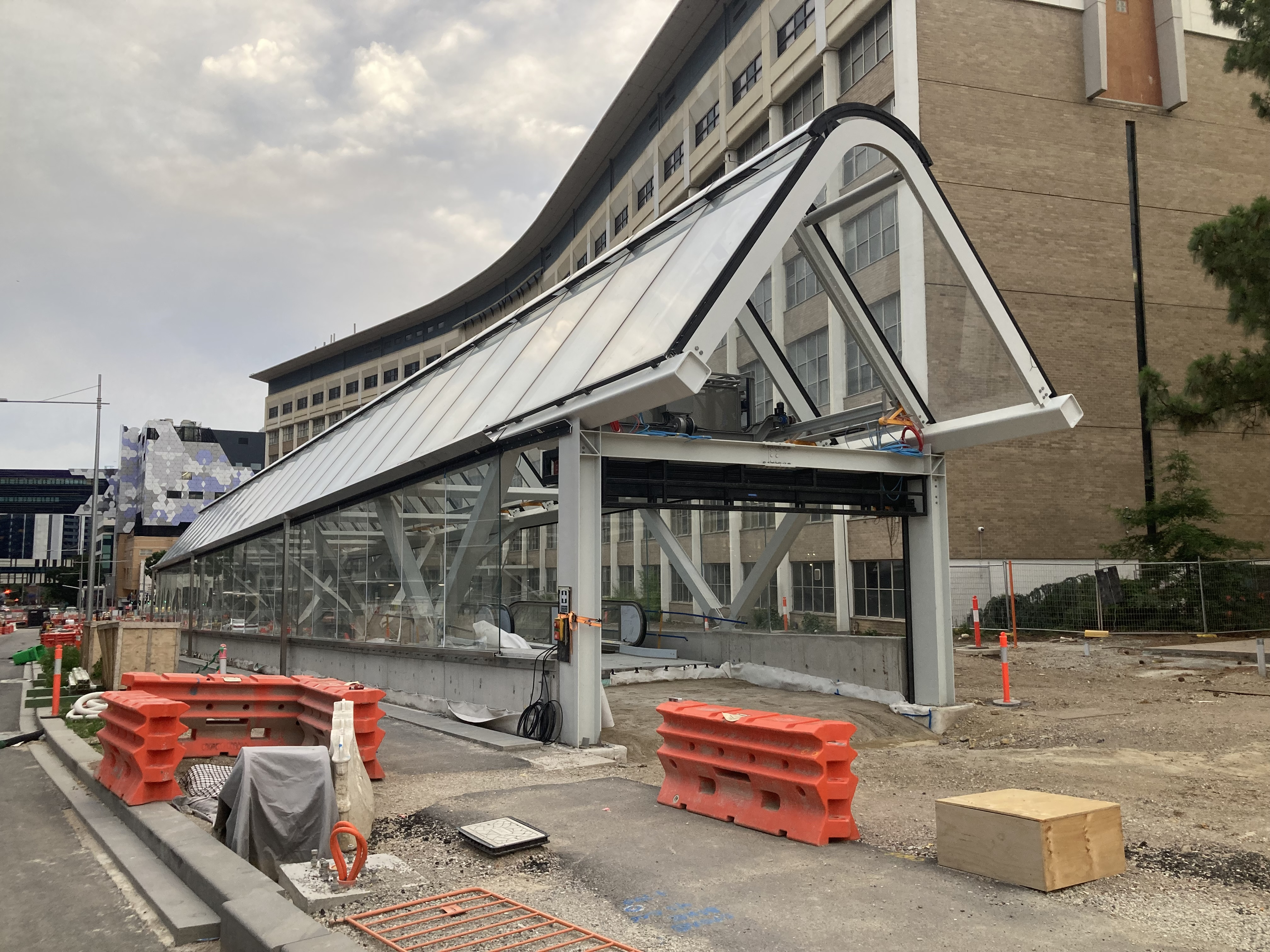
The almost completed main and eastern entrance on Grattan Street outside Melbourne University, January 2024

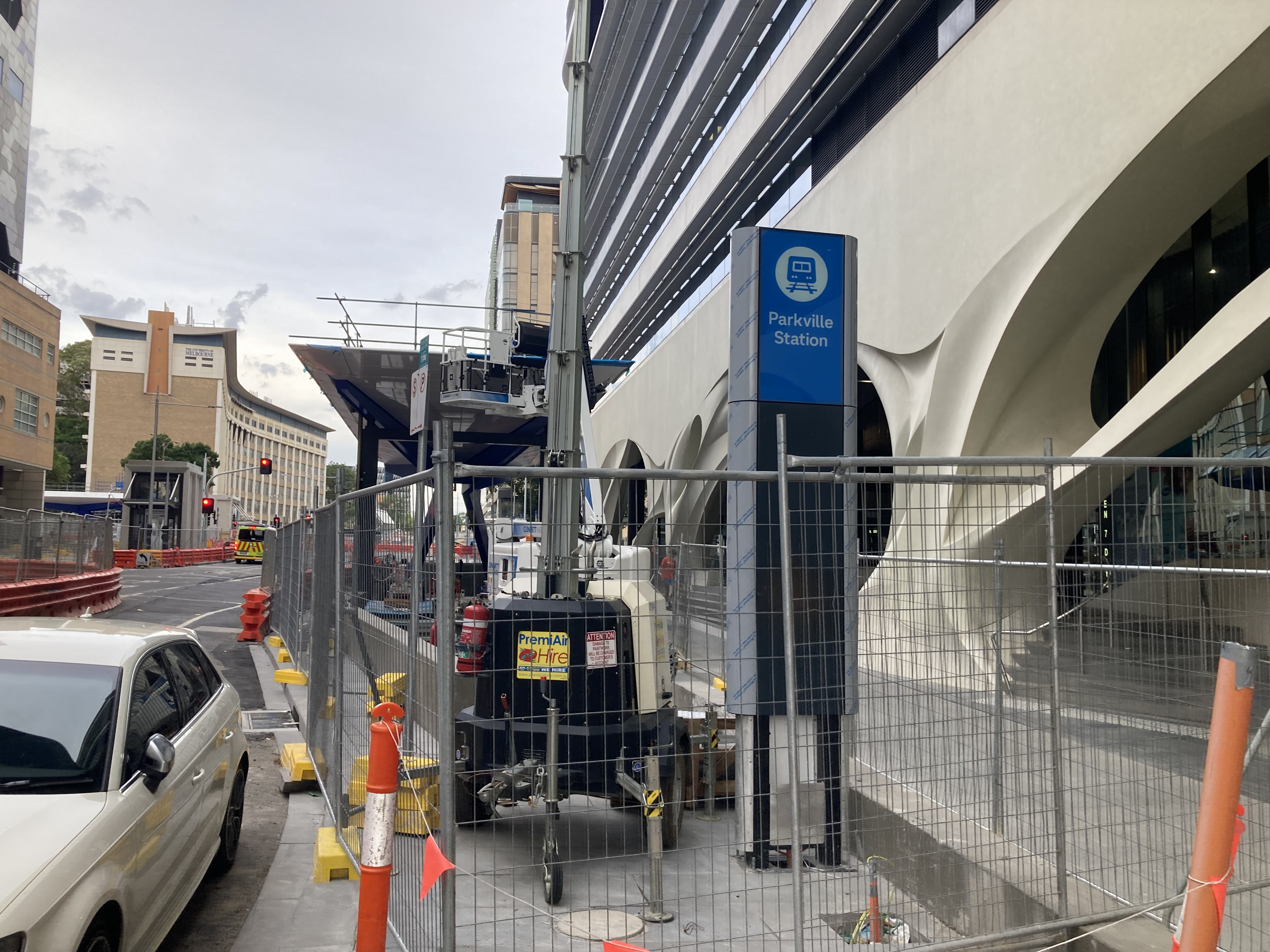
New Grattan street western station entrance, looking east towards Royal Parade, January 2024

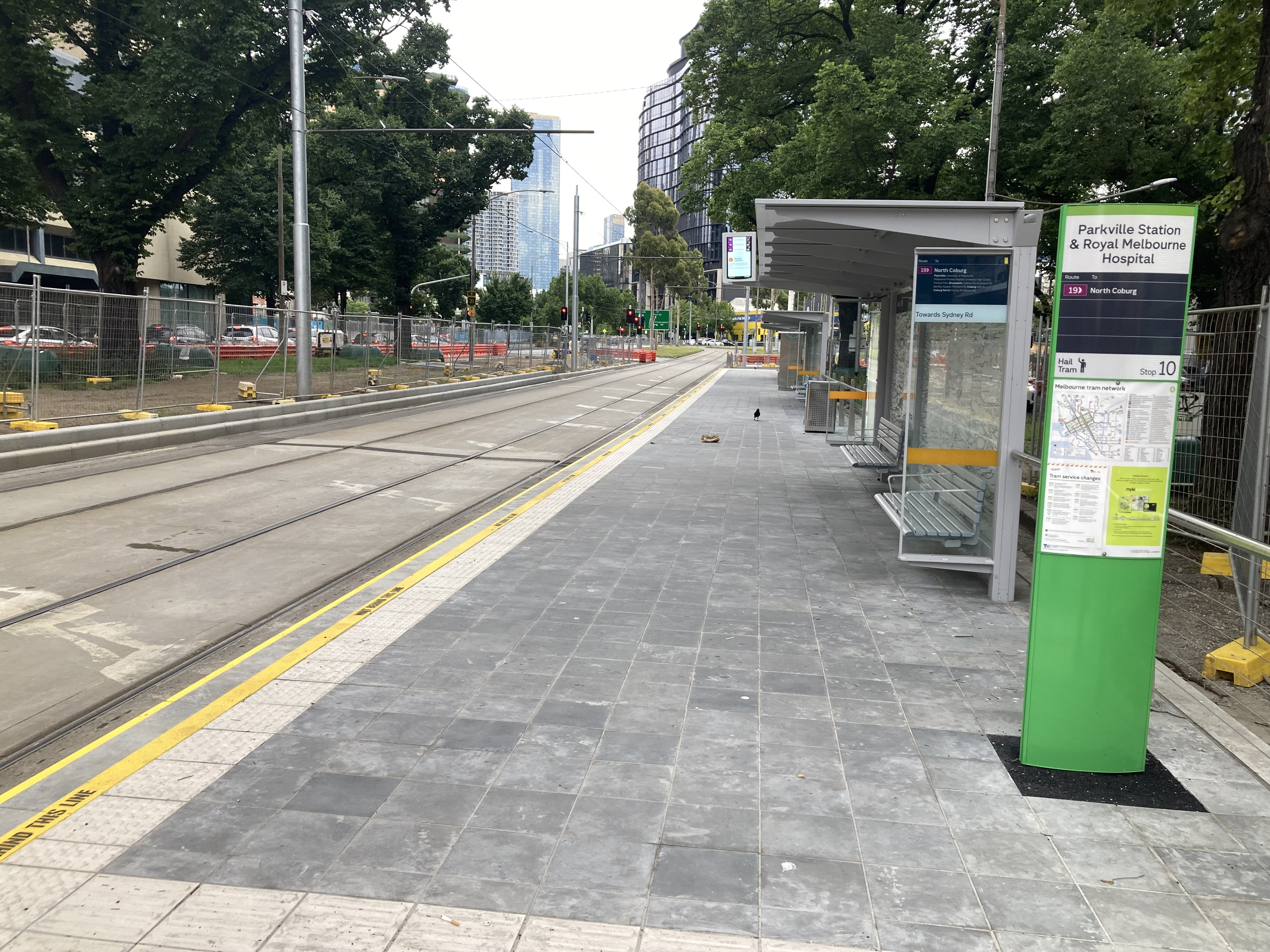
New Royal Parade tram stop, looking south towards Haymarket roundabout, January 2024

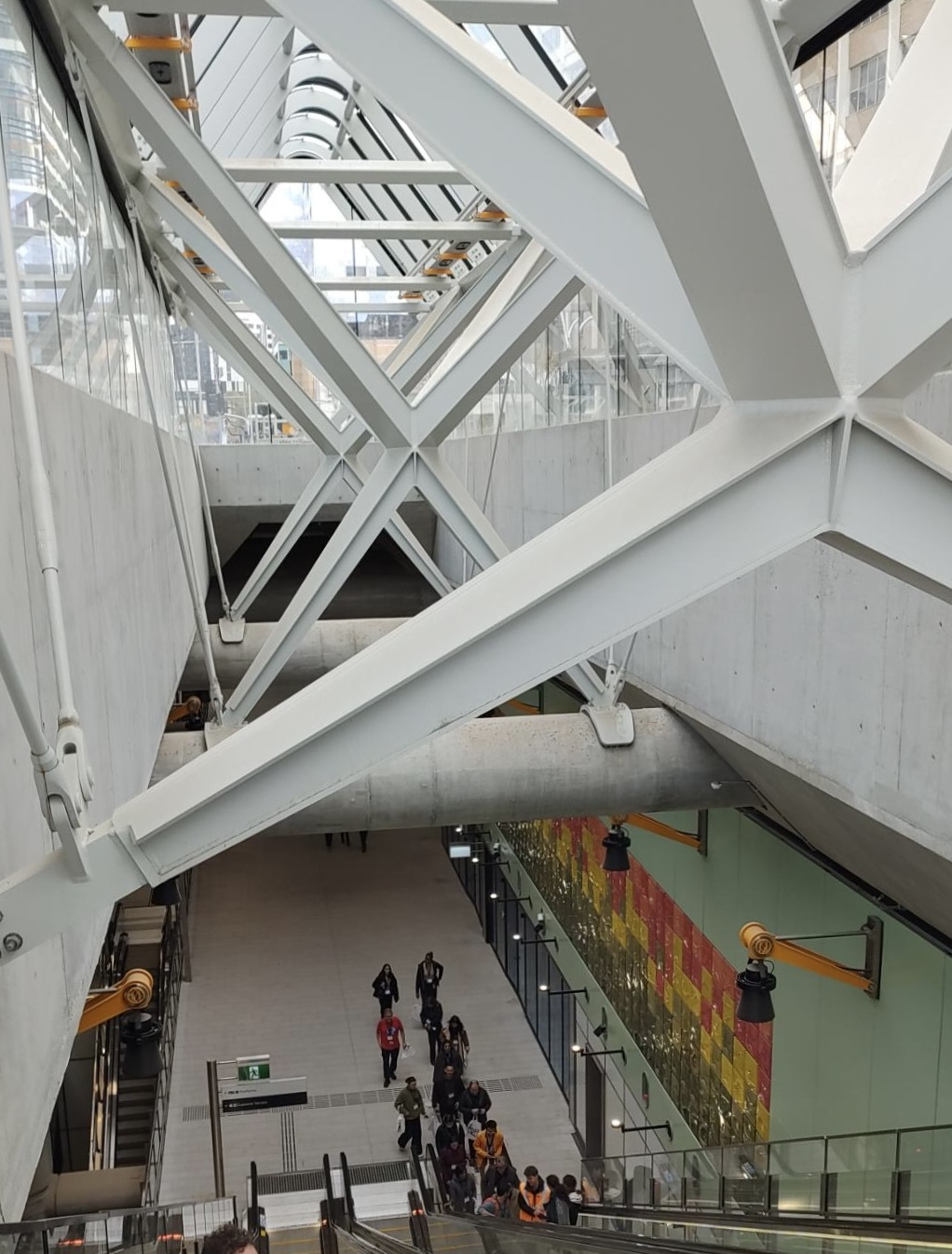
Escalator down to platforms

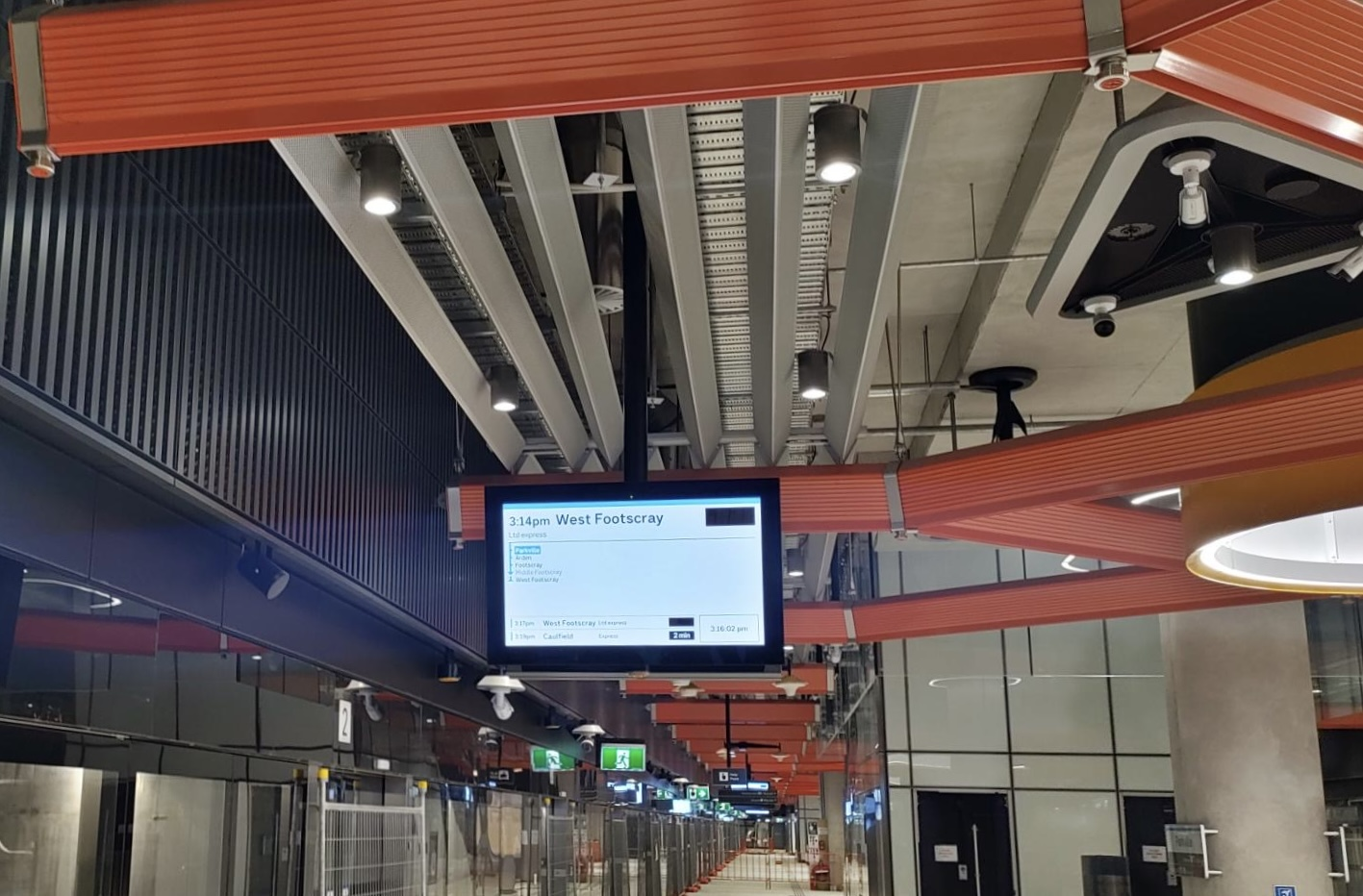
Detail of platform with test train running prior to the opening of the line, June 2024

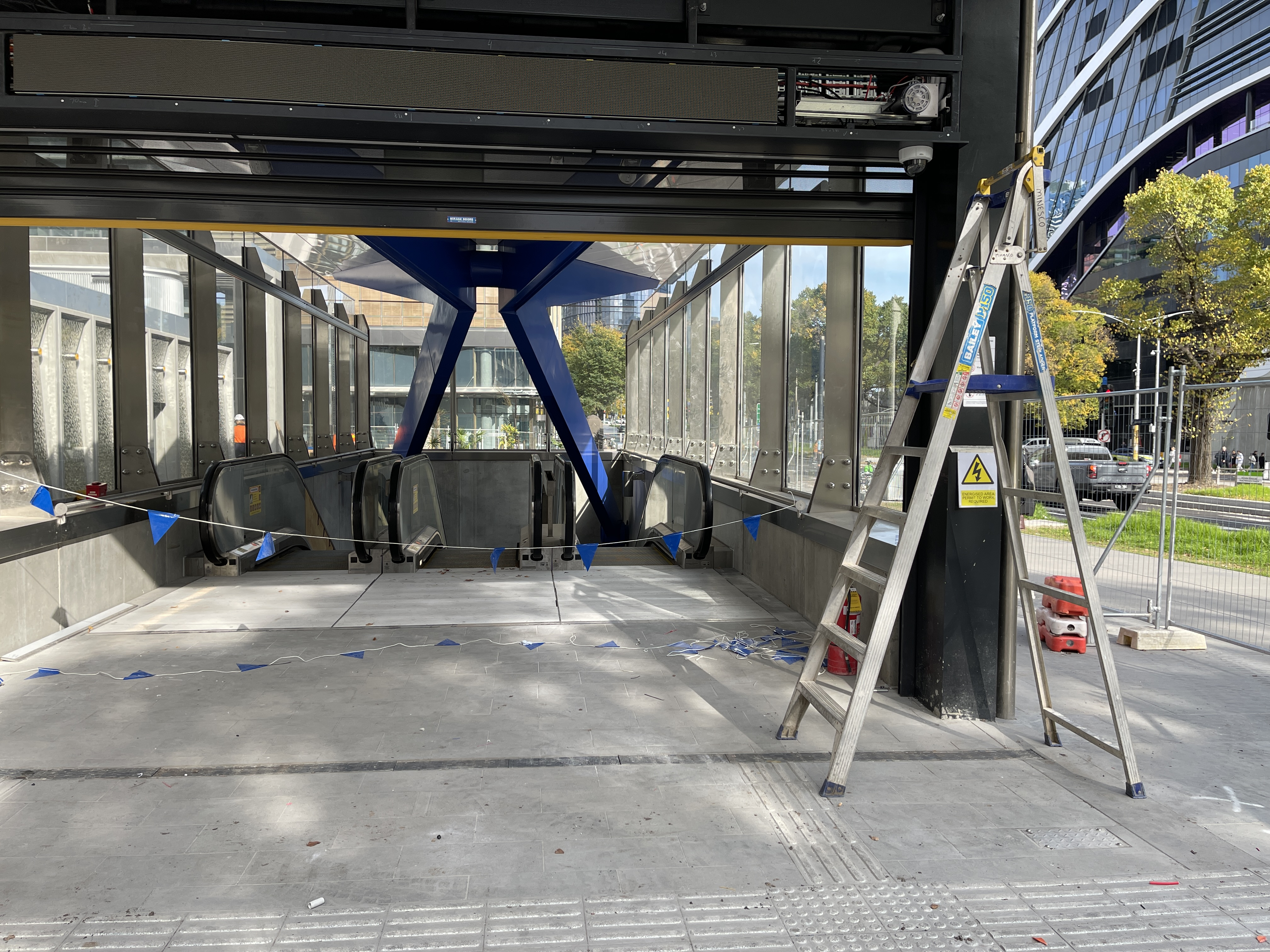
Near-completed station entrance facing south down the royal parade, next to the University of Melbourne Medical Building, May 2024

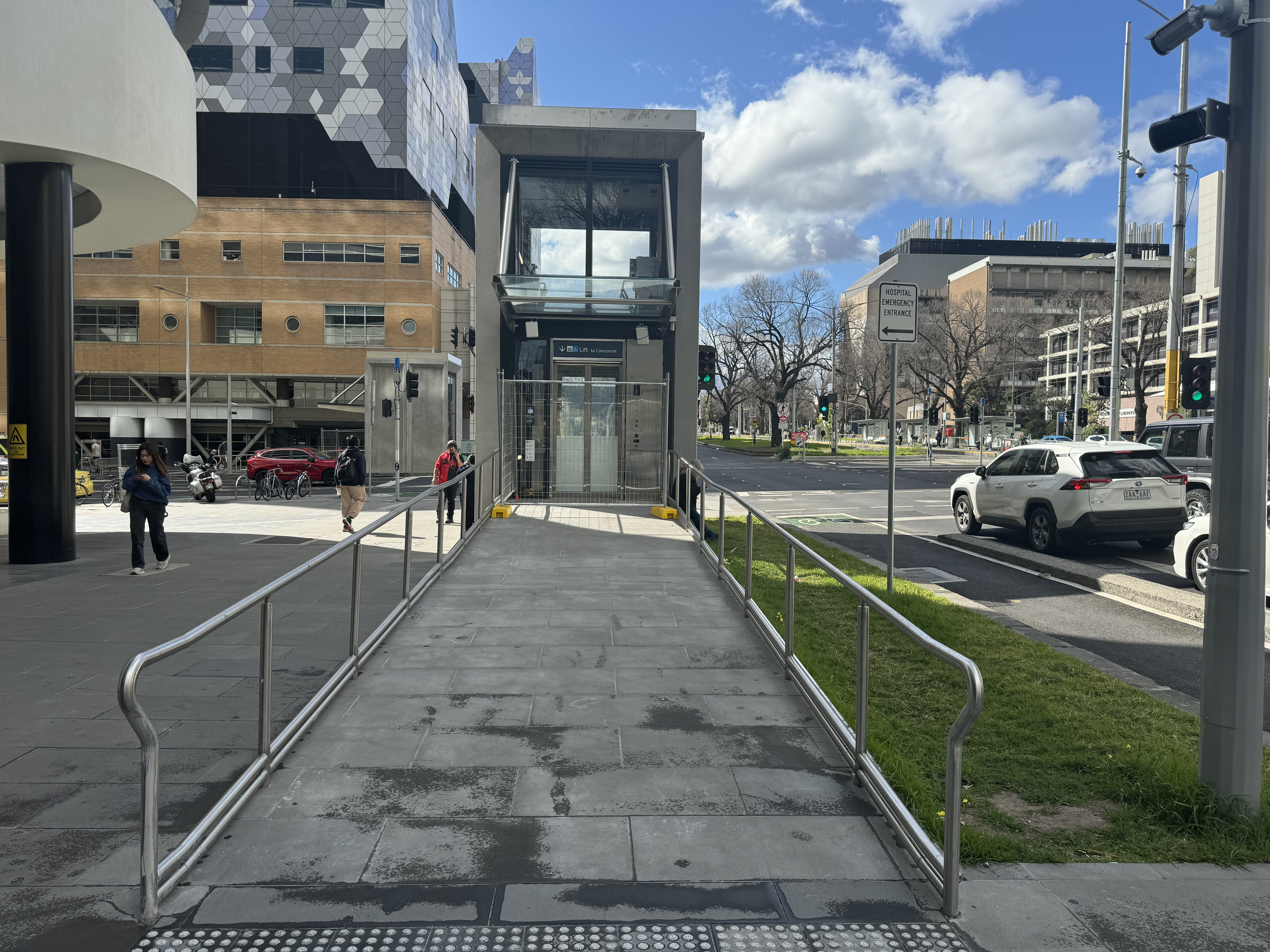
The completed southern entrance lift access from Royal Parade, September 2024

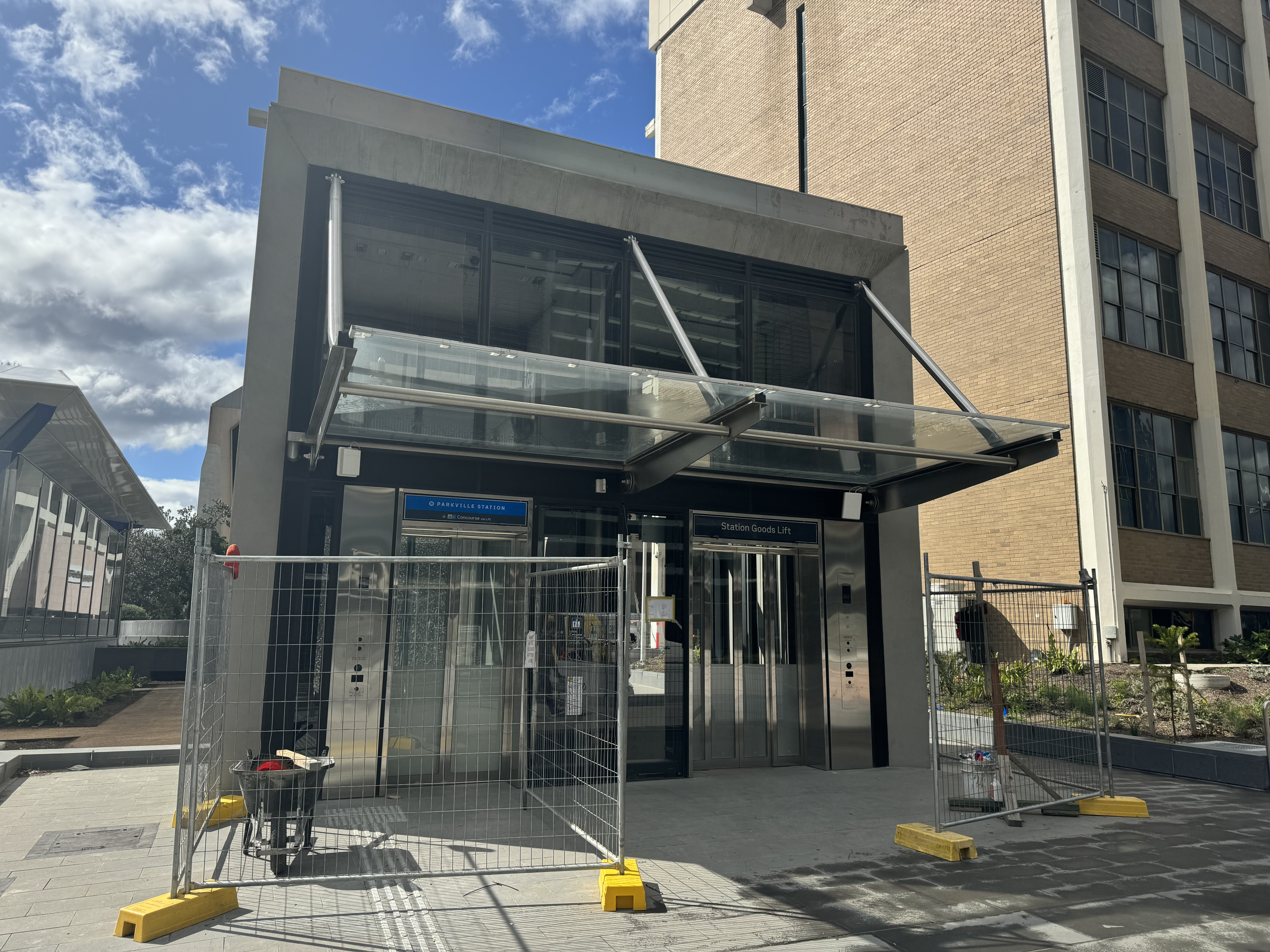
The completed lift access on eastern entrance from Grattan Street, September 2024

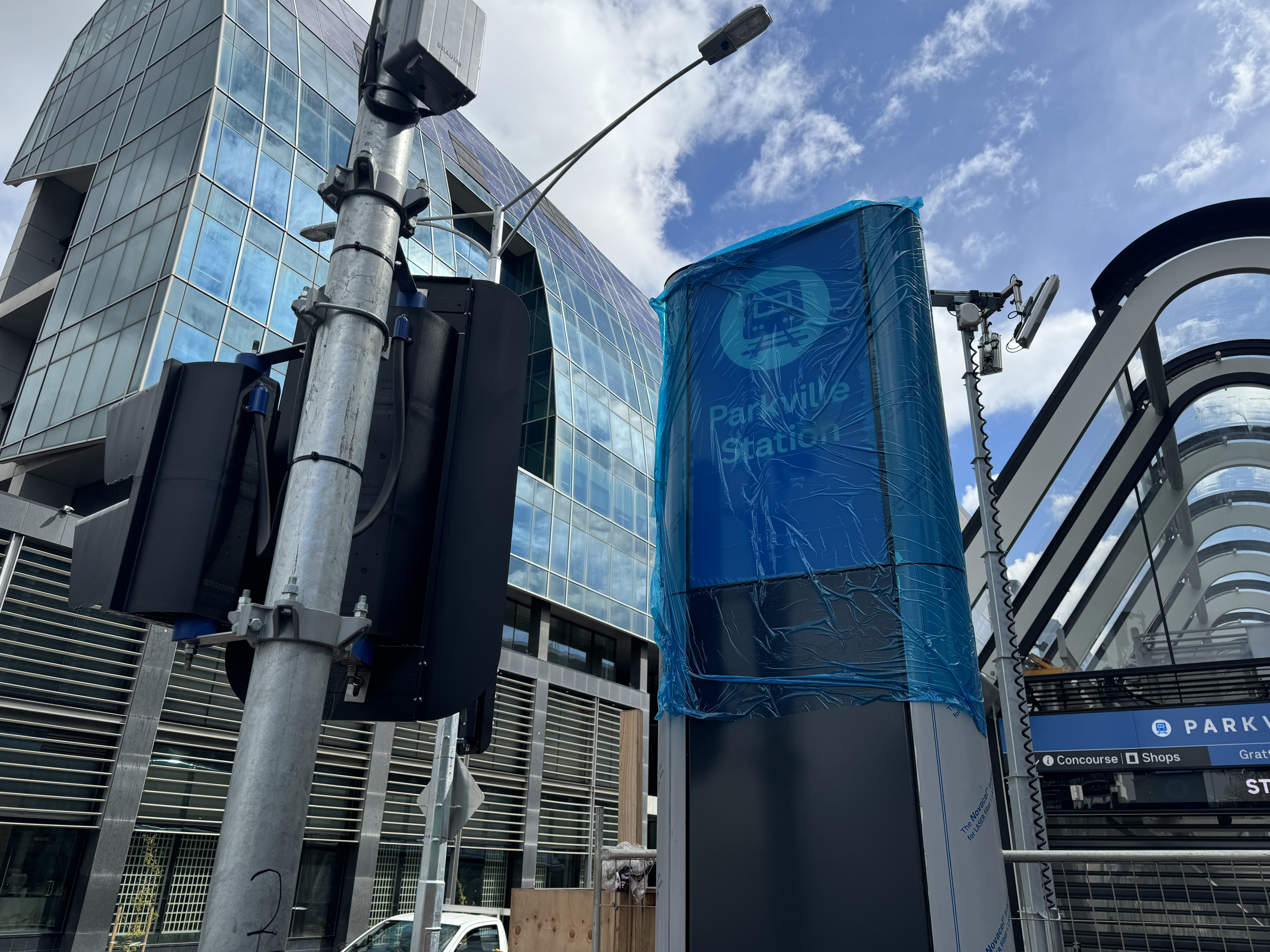
An unwrapped station entrance signage near the main and eastern entrance on Grattan Street, September 2024

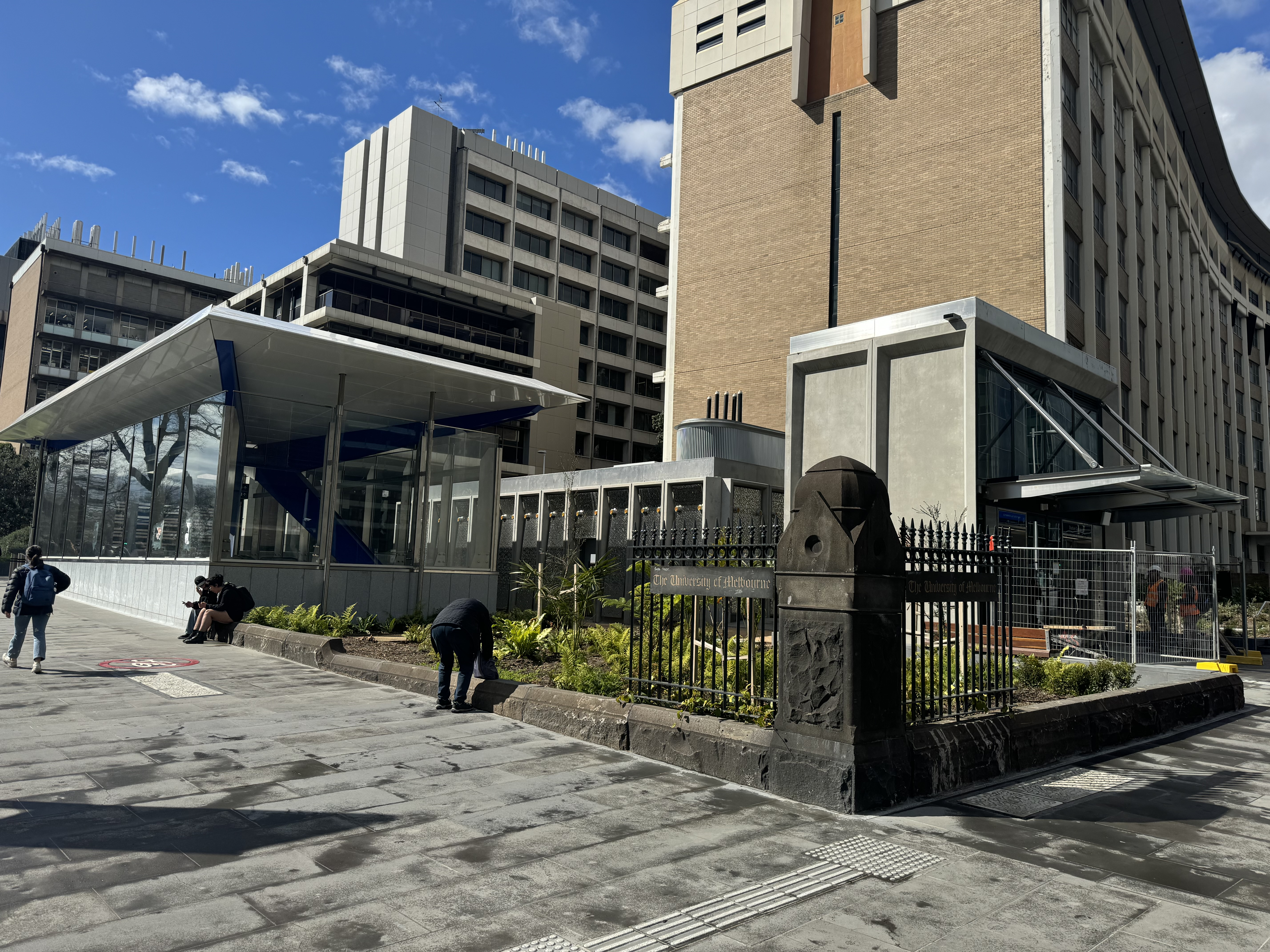
The lift and north-east entrance on Grattan Street/Royal Parade intersection, September 2024

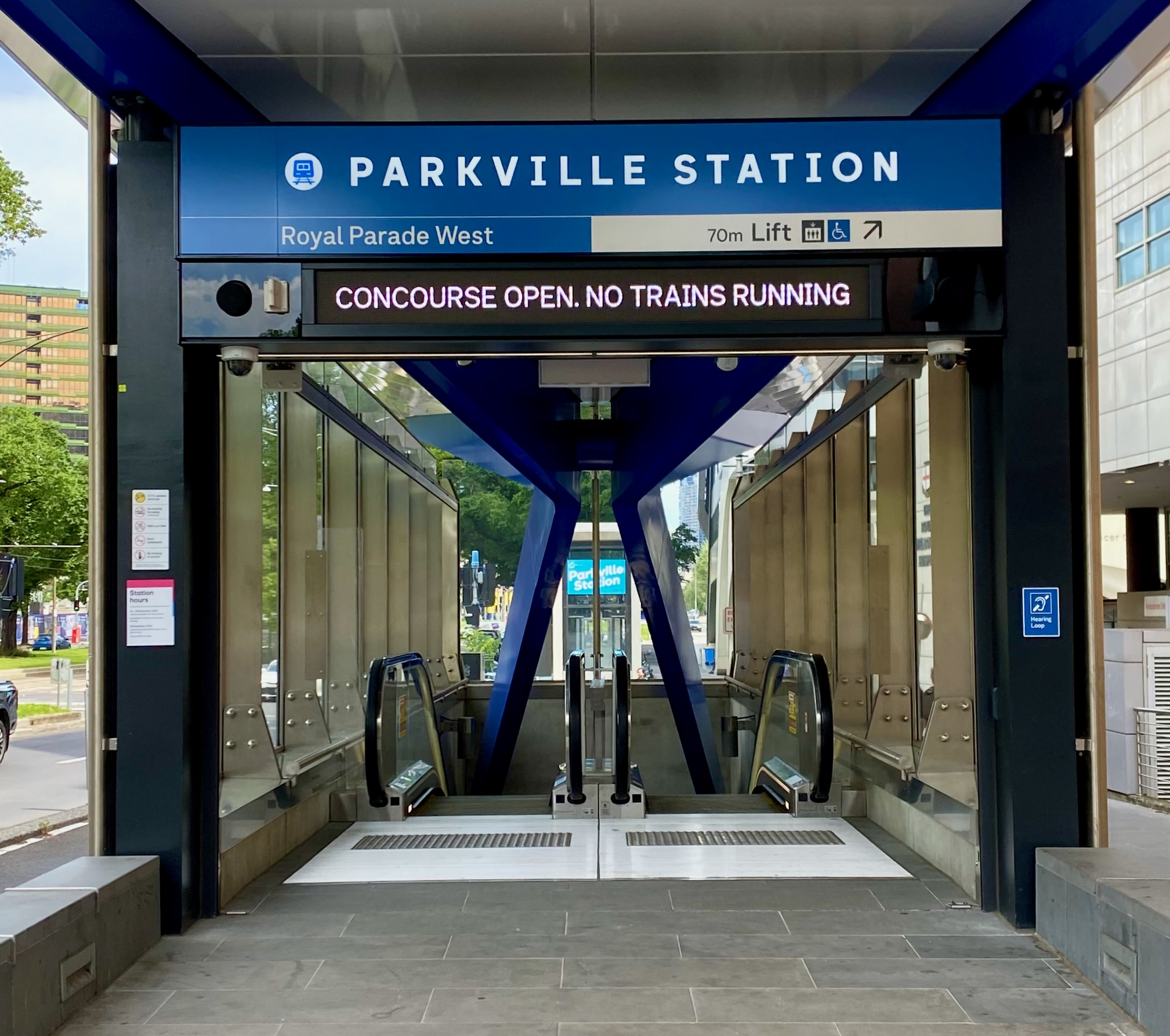
Royal Parade Entrance next to the Royal Melbourne Hospital

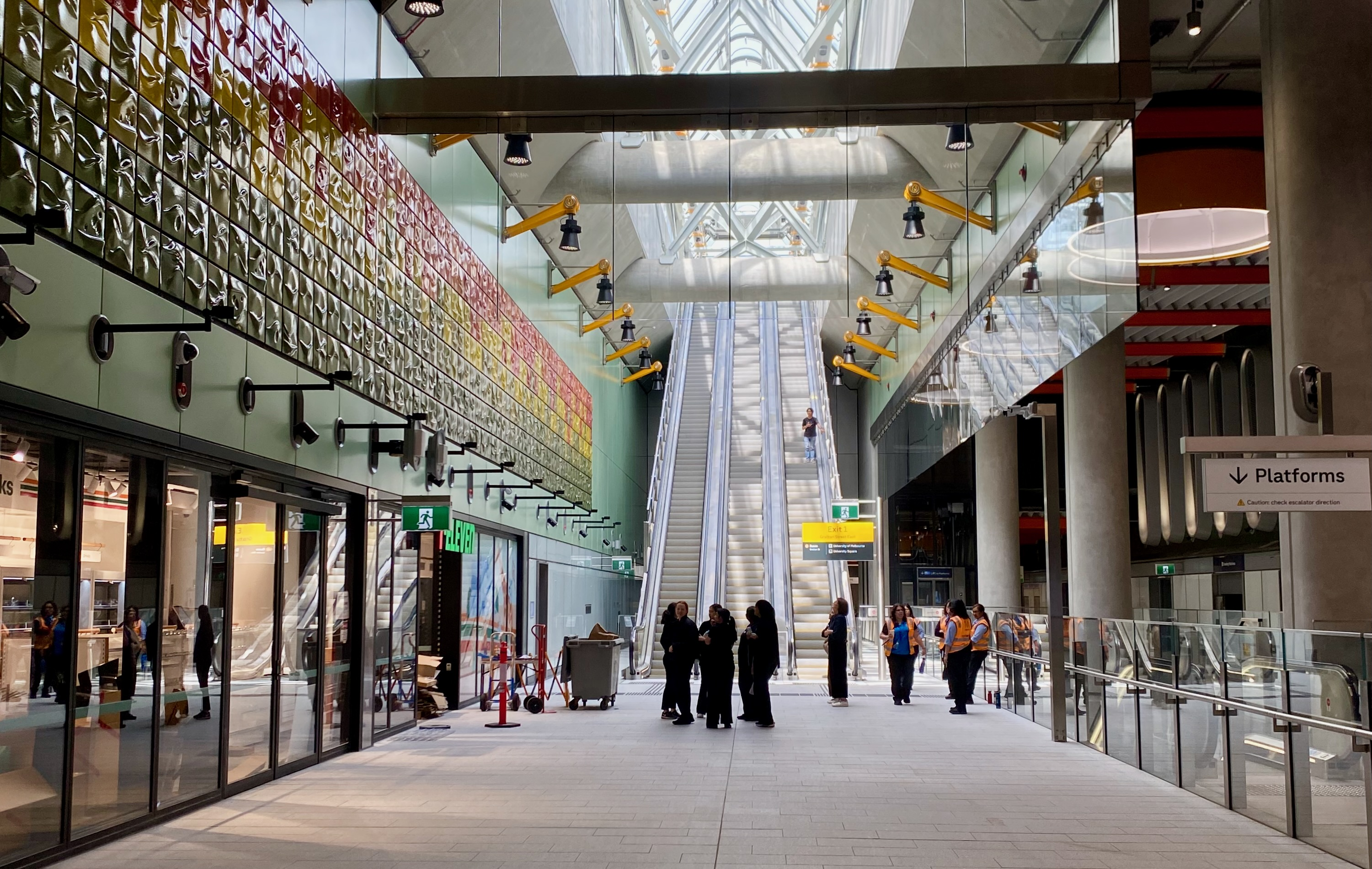
Concourse near ticket barriers

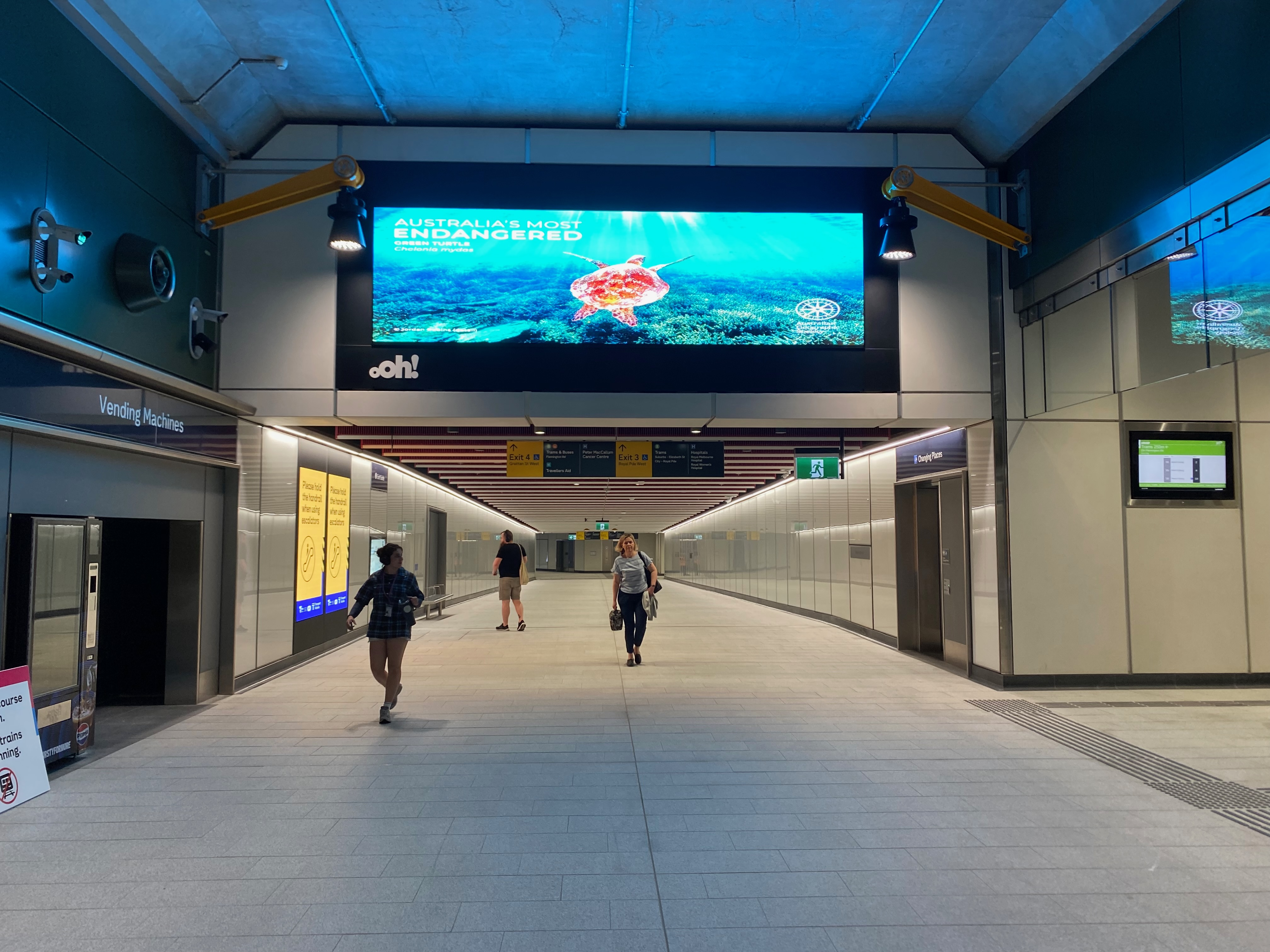
Concourse near exits
