= Avoca railway line =

Railway line in Victoria, Australia

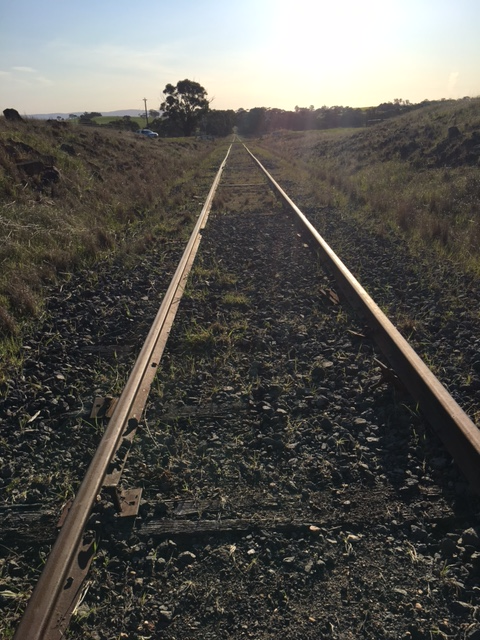
- Avoca railway line west of Bung Bong

Overview
- Status: Freight only line (currently reopened)
- Stations: 4

Service
- Type: Branch
- Rolling stock: Ballast, Grain

History
- Opened: 1874
- Completed: 1890
- Closed: 2005
- Reopened: January 2018

Technical
- Line length: 87.769 km (54.537 mi)
- Number of tracks: Single track
- Track gauge: 1,435 mm (4 ft 8 1/2 in) standard gauge
- Old gauge: 1,600 mm (5 ft 3 in) broad gauge
- Signalling: Staff & Ticket

The Maryborough–Avoca–Ararat railway is a railway line in western Victoria, Australia. It is one of the few railway lines in the state to have been closed and then reopened. Today it is a standard gauge branch line connecting the Western SG with Bung Bong (ballast) and Dunolly (grain), running through Maryborough station.

== History ==
The first section of line was opened as a branch from Maryborough to Avoca in October 1874, 24 kilometres in length, then was extended 62.8 kilometres to Ararat in November 1890, forming a through route between two main lines. In July 1959 the line between Avoca and Ararat was closed. In October 1966 the line was reopened, and in 1996 it was converted to standard gauge, along with the main Melbourne–Adelaide railway.

The Avoca–Ararat section of the line has been unused for a number of years and Pacific National used it to store over 100 surplus grain wagons, until many of them were reactivated to carry the 2011–2012 harvest. Although more wagons were stored after this, all were cleared in preparation for re-opening the line.

The line was to be reopened as standard gauge and upgraded to 21-tonne axle loads, with insertion of over 100,000 new concrete sleepers. The second reopening of this cross-country line was primarily to allow for the carriage of mineral sands from Manangatang to a processing plant at Hamilton. The reopening project included construction of a direct standard gauge connection between the Avoca and Hamilton lines at Ararat to avoid the need for trains to have to reverse at Ararat. However, following cancellation of the conversion of the Robinvale line to standard gauge in 2020, it is almost certain these trains will not operate.

It was announced in June 2017 that work would begin to reopen the 87 km line between Maryborough and Ararat. The Maryborough-Ararat rail freight line was officially re-opened at Avoca early in 2018 after more than 13 years of siting idle.

== Operations ==
The line is used for services from the Mildura and Murrayville lines heading to Melbourne, as there is no direct standard gauge link from Maryborough to Geelong via Ballarat. This forces services on the standard gauge lines to Mildura and Murrayville to instead take the longer route via Avoca and Ararat.

== See also ==
- Adelaide Lead, the railway
- Ararat railway station
- Avoca railway station
- Bung Bong, Victoria
- Homebush railway station, Victoria
