= Better Farming Train =

Better Farming Train may refer to:

- Better Farming Train (Saskatchewan) which toured Saskatchewan, Canada between 1914 and 1922
- Better Farming Train (New South Wales) which toured New South Wales, Australia between 1927 and 1929
- Better Farming Train (Victoria) which toured Victoria, Australia between 1924 and 1935
