= Rochester railway station (disambiguation) =

Rochester railway station is on the Chatham Main Line in Kent, England.

Rochester railway station or Rochester station may also refer to:

- Rochester railway station, Victoria, a regional rail station in Victoria, Australia
- Louise M. Slaughter Rochester Station, an intermodal passenger station in Rochester, New York, United States
- Erie Railroad Depot (Rochester, New York), a former railway station in the United States
- Lehigh Valley Railroad Station (Rochester, New York), a historic railway station in the United States
