= Better Farming Train (Victoria) =

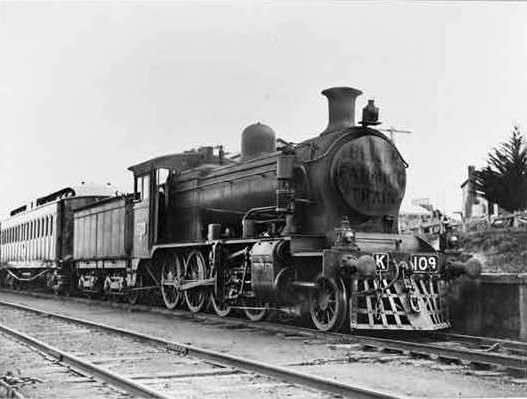
K class locomotive on the inaugural Better Farming Train in Gippsland in October 1924.

The Better Farming Train was an agricultural demonstration train which toured Victoria, Australia in the 1920s and 1930s to promote better farming practices. It was the first of two agricultural demonstration trains to run in Australia.

== Background ==
The idea of special trains to promote better agricultural practices was developed in Canada in the early years of the 20th century. In 1904, special trains brought farmers to the Dominion Experimental Farm in Indian Head, Saskatchewan, Canada to demonstrate farming techniques. From 1914 to 1922, a Better Farming Train ran throughout Saskatchewan.

The Victorian train was devised by Harold Clapp, Chairman of Commissioners of the Victorian Railways, and Dr Samuel Cameron, the Victorian Director of Agriculture. It was operated jointly by the Victorian Departments of Agriculture, Railways, Education and Public Health. The agricultural content of the train was devised by Hubert Mullett, an agricultural scientist with the Department of Agriculture and later Director of Agriculture.

== The train ==
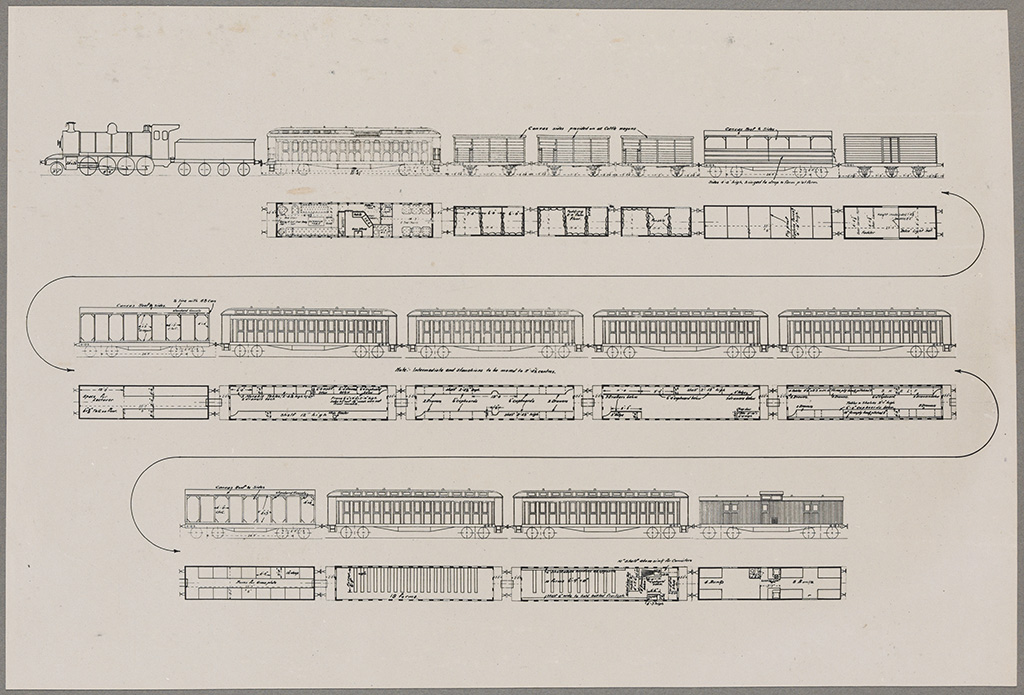
Diagram showing arrangement of the Better Farming Train.

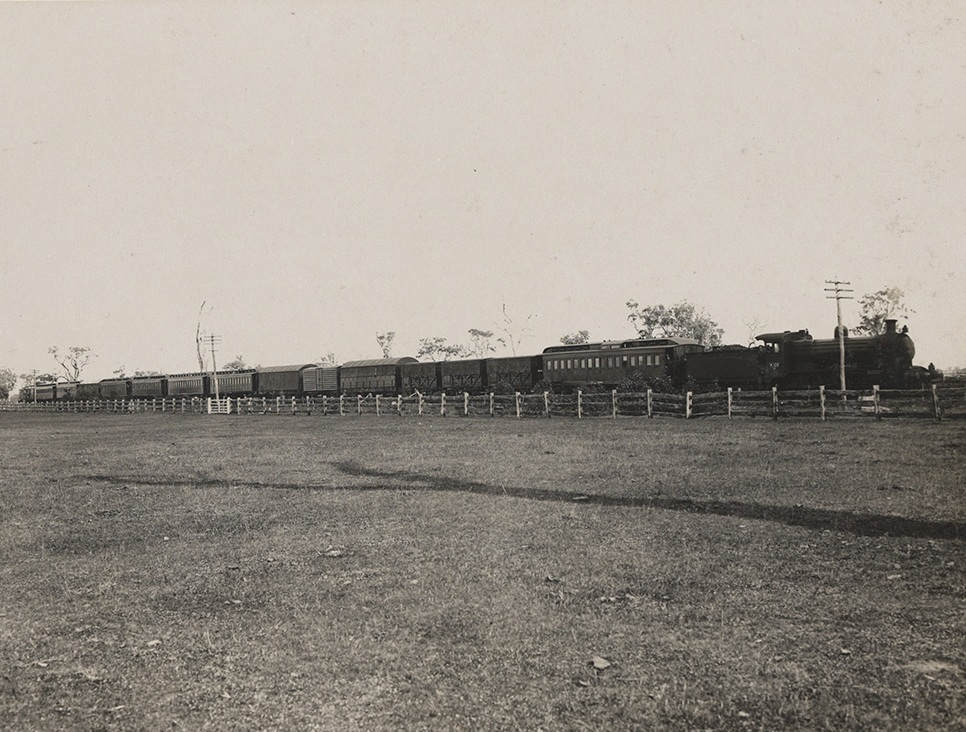
The full train on its inaugural run in Gippsland in October 1924.

The Department of Agriculture described the train as an "agricultural college on wheels". Fifteen carriages were fitted out with displays covering livestock, dairy, crop production, pasture, farm machinery, cooking and infant welfare. The train was painted bright yellow to attract attention and included sleeping accommodation for the 80 staff.

A typical composition, taken from the May 1925 tour, was:

- Car 1: Special car Victoria for staff accommodation
- Car 2: Louvre van with electric generator and live stock fodder
- Cars 3-5: Cattle trucks, each with three padded compartments.
- Car 6: An open truck with six compartments for pigs.
- Car 7: A flat car used as a lecture platform.
- Car 8: A corridor carriage fitted with display tables of agricultural utensils.
- Car 9: A carriage with a display of veterinary exhibits.
- Car 10: A carriage of potato exhibits.
- Car 11: A carriage displaying wool production techniques, various types of weeds and grasses and soil analysis techniques.
- Car 12: A carriage of fruit production techniques.

== Tours ==
The full train made 38 tours of regional Victoria and into southern New South Wales and eastern South Australia. The displays were varied depending on the area visited, for example dairy in Gippsland and grain in the Wimmera. In addition, the "Domestic" and "Women's" sections of the train, featuring baby health, needlework and cookery, made independent tours to some locations and a Wool Demonstration Train ran in 1934.

The first tour departed Melbourne on 13 October 1924 and toured Gippsland with the first stop at Bunyip. The response from the public was beyond expectations, with some people travelling 60 to 80 miles (97 to 129 km) to see the train, and lecture cars proved to be too small. There were also criticisms of some of the arrangements for the visiting public. Between 500 and 2,000 people visited the train at each location and the tour was so successful that a second tour was planned before the first one had returned to Melbourne.

At the end of the 6th tour, Dr Cameron wrote "I have no hesitation whatever in saying that the Better Farming Train ... has made a greater appeal to the practical farmer and the younger generation of agriculturalists than anything that has hitherto been attained in Australia".

Tours became less frequent during the Great Depression and a temporary suspension was considered in 1930, however the Minister for Agriculture William Slater said it had been of inestimable value. With state finances becoming tight, in May 1932 the Commonwealth Bank made a grant of £600 to finance the next tour. The final tour was in 1935 when funding was withdrawn.

Reviving the train was considered in July 1939 if assistance was available from the Commonwealth, however this was prevented by the outbreak of World War II.

== Interest from other states ==
In December 1924, the Government of South Australia made enquiries about borrowing the train for a tour of that state. Experts from South Australia visited Victoria in 1926 to examine the train, and there was interest from New South Wales and Queensland. The train eventually toured South Australia in 1929.

New South Wales operated its own Better Farming Train between 1927 and 1929.

== Tour locations ==
Tour	Region	Dates	Places visited	Notes
1	Gippsland	13–23 October 1924	Bunyip, Neerim South, Warragul, Yarragon, Mirboo North, Morwell, Maffra, Bairnsdale, Kilmany, Traralgon, Moe, Drouin.	
2	South Gippsland	10–15 November 1924	Lang Lang, Meeniyan, Yarram, Toora, Korumburra, Cranbourne.	
3	Western District	1–12 December 1924	Colac, Terang, Allansford, Warrnambool, Penshurst, Branxholme, Heywood, Portland, Hamilton, Koroit, Camperdown, Birregurra, Moriac.	
4	North Central/Goulburn Valley	9–21 March 1925	Elmore, Cohuna, Gunbower, Rochester, Echuca, Tongala/Kyabram, Tatura, Shepparton, Cobram, Numurkah, Stanhope, Murchison.	
-	Gippsland	16–25 April 1925	Warragul, Thorpdale, Moe, Morwell, Mirboo North, Trafalgar.	Domestic section only.
5	Goldfields/Mallee	11–22 May 1925	Castlemaine, Raywood, Mitiamo, Kerang, Nyah, Kooloonong, Piangil, Swan Hill, Tresco, Pyramid, Dingee, Bendigo.	
6	North East	17–28 August 1925	Devenish, Yarrawonga, Benalla, Springhurst, Wangaratta, Wodonga, Myrtleford, Violet Town, Seymour.	
7	Central Victoria	12–17 October 1925	Broadford, Alexandra, Yea, Mansfield, Merton, Wallan.	
8	Midlands/Goldfields	9–20 November 1925	Sunbury, Kyneton, Redesdale, Newstead, Maryborough, Clunes, Creswick, Newlyn, Daylesford, Trentham.	
9	Central West	30 November - 11 December 1925	Ballan, Bungaree, Ballarat, Waubra, Linton, Skipton, Meredith, Geelong, Little River.	
-	South Gippsland	8–13 February 1926	Koo Wee Rup, Korumburra, Meeniyan, Toora, Fish Creek, Leongatha.	Domestic section only.
-	Central Victoria	15 February 1926	Alexandra.	Domestic Arts and Mothercraft cars only.
10	Wimmera/Mallee	8–20 March 1926	Minyip, Beulah, Patchewollock, Hopetoun, Warracknabeal, Horsham, Jeparit, Rainbow, Dimboola, Kaniva, Nhill, Murtoa.	
-	South Gippsland	8–11 June 1926	Nyora, Glen Forbes, Anderson, Wonthaggi.	Women's Section only.
11	Mallee/Sunraysia	26 July - 7 August 1926	Donald, Woomelang, Underbool, Murrayville, Walpeup, Carwarp, Mildura, Ouyen, Speed, Birchip, Watchem, St Arnaud.	
-	North East	30 August - 4 September 1926	Goorambat, St James, Yarrawonga, Benalla.	Women's Section only.
12	Mallee	4–15 October 1926	Boort, Ultima, Manangatang, Annuello, Chillingollah, Quambatook, Charlton, Wycheproof, Sea Lake, Kulwin, Culgoa.	
13	Midlands/Goldfields	8–13 November 1926	Kilmore, Inglewood, Wedderburn, Marong, Axedale, Heathcote.	
14	Yarra Valley/Mornington Peninsula	6–10 December 1926	Whittlesea, Lilydale, Healesville, Somerville, Red Hill.	
15	Western District/Wimmera	21–31 March 1927	Inverleigh, Cressy, Lismore, Westmere, Willaura, Glenthompson, Stawell, Ararat, Beaufort, Burrumbeet.	
-	Western District	30 May-9 June 1927	Winchelsea, Colac, Cobden, Mortlake, Panmure, Port Fairy, Koroit.	Domestic Section only.
16	Mallee/Riverina (New South Wales)	11–23 July 1927	Goornong, Lockington, Cohuna, Gunbower, Rochester, Deniliquin, Mathoura, Bunnaloo, Moulamein, Balranald, Wakool, Echuca.	
17	Midlands/Goldfields/Mallee	15–27 August 1927	Malmsbury, Prairie, Swan Hill, Piangil, Kooloonong, Nyah West, Mystic Park, Murrabit, Kerang, Mincha, Harcourt, Maldon.	
18	Gippsland	10–21 October 1927	Warragul, Trafalgar, Mirboo North, Yinnar, Maffra, Bairnsdale, Orbost, Bruthen, Sale, Rosedale, Pakenham.	
19	South Gippsland	14–19 November 1927	Koo Wee Rup, Dalyston, Leongatha, Yarram, Foster, Loch.	
20	Western District	6–16 March 1928	Koroit, Hamilton, Cavendish, Balmoral, Portland, Condah, Casterton, Merino, Coleraine, Penshurst.	
21	Western District	7–12 May 1928	Winchelsea, Camperdown, Panmure, Mortlake, Colac, Drysdale.	Originally scheduled for one week earlier. Postponed to prevent clashing with the Warrnambool Racing Carnival.
22	Mallee	30 July-9 August 1928	Carwarp, Merrinee, Meringur, Werrimull, Red Cliffs, Ouyen, Underbool, Murrayville, Cowangie, Walpeup.	
23	Goulburn Valley	27 August-6 September 1928	Nagambie, Colbinabbin, Girgarre, Tatura, Tongala, Shepparton, Dookie, Numurkah, Cobram, Nathalia.	
24	North East	22 October-1 November 1928	Euroa, St James, Yarrawonga, Tatong, Wangaratta, Myrtleford, Rutherglen, Tallangatta, Wodonga, Chiltern, Benalla.	
25	Wimmera	12–22 March 1929	Horsham, Natimuk, Goroke, Toolondo, Dimboola, Kaniva, Nhill, Jeparit, Rainbow, Lorquon.	
26	Wimmera/Mallee	19–24 April 1929	Warracknabeal, Beulah, Hopetoun, Patchewollock, Murtoa.	
27	Central Victoria	16–26 June 1929	Werribee, Longwood, Seymour, Alexandra, Yea, Mansfield, Merton, Kilmore, Axedale, Heathcote.	
28	Central Victoria/Goldfields	30 July-8 August 1929	Trentham, Newlyn, Clunes, Navarre, Elmhurst, Avoca, Carisbrook, Kyneton, Gisborne.	
29	South Australia	7–17 October 1929	Bordertown, Murray Bridge, Balaklava, Gladstone, Gawler, Kapunda, Riverton, Mount Barker.	
30	Western District/Central Victoria	24 March-4 April 1930	Winchelsea, Cressy, Westmere, Glenthompson, Strathkellar, Willaura, Derrinallum, Moriac, Lara, Diggers Rest, Melton.	
31	Gippsland	23 June-2 July 1930	Drouin, Thorpdale, Boolarra, Heyfield, Boisdale, Bruthen, Orbost, Lindenow, Neerim South, Berwick.	
32	South Gippsland	21–29 July 1930	Clyde, Yannathan, Meeniyan, Toora, Yarram, Fish Creek, Korumburra, Kernot.	
33	Mallee/Northern Districts	19–30 October 1931	Dingee, Swan Hill, Murrabit, Kerang, Pyramid, Rochester, Kyabram, Gunbower, Cohuna, Lockington.	
34	Western District/Goulburn Valley	8–18 March 1932	Timboon, Cobden, Stanhope, Tatura, Tongala, Kyabram, Numurkah, Cobram, Shepparton.	
35	Mallee	12–22 July 1932	Quambatook, Manangatang, Robinvale, Ultima, Boort, Culgoa, Nandaly, Sea Lake, Wycheproof, Charlton.	
36	Western District	10–19 October 1933	Warrnambool, Port Fairy, Hawkesdale, Coleraine, Portland, Heywood, Condah, Merino, Casterton.	
37	North East	18–28 September 1934	Beechworth, Cudgewa, Tallangatta, Huon, Wahgunyah, Goorambat, Tungamah, Yarrawonga.	
-	Central/Goulburn Valley/North East	3–16 October 1934	Seymour, Mansfield, Yea, Shepparton, Murchison, Rushworth, Nagambie, Euroa, Benalla, Wangaratta.	Wool Demonstration Train run jointly with the Country Women's Association.
38	Mallee/Sunraysia	25 March-4 April 1935	Tempy, Underbool, Murrayville, Ouyen, Mildura, Merrinee, Meringur, Werrimull, Red Cliffs.	

== Gallery ==
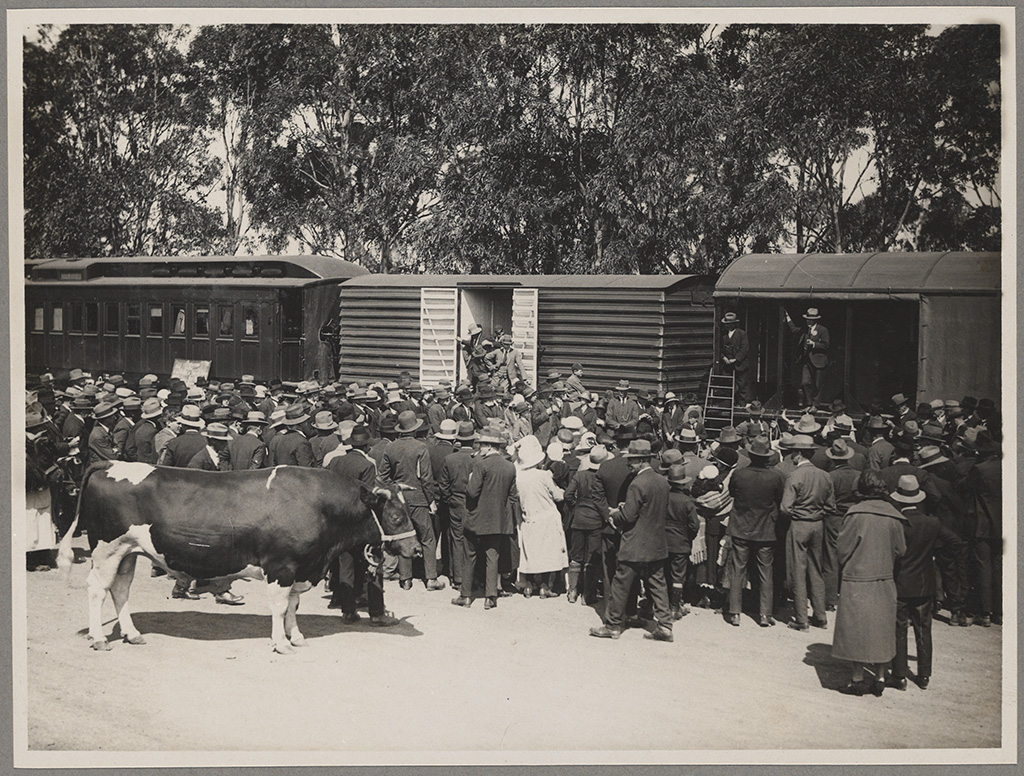
A lecture on pure bred stock

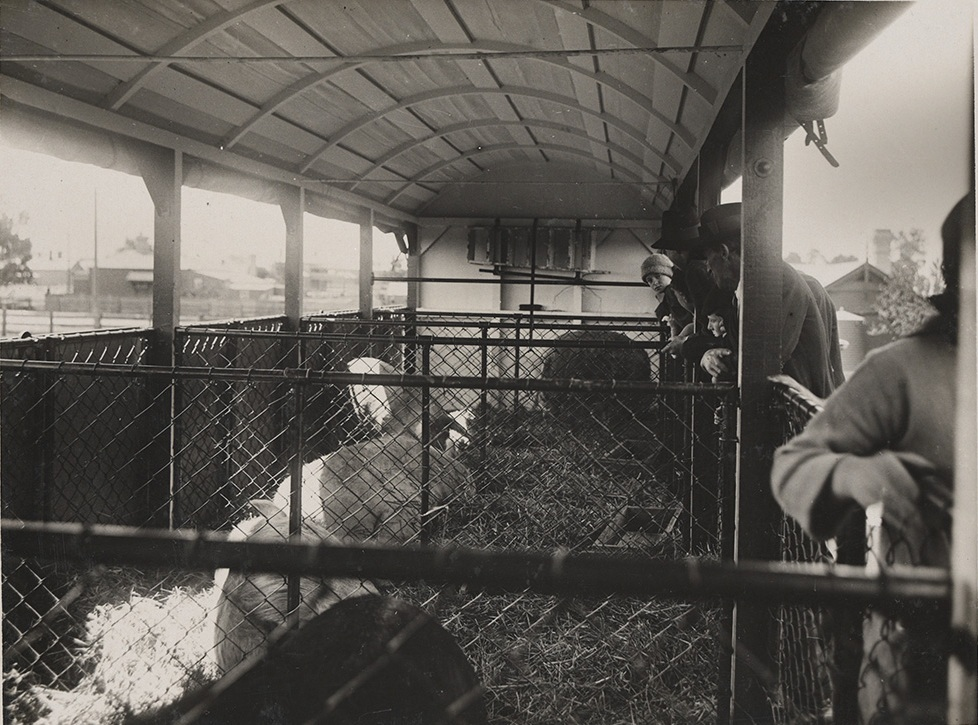
Pig truck

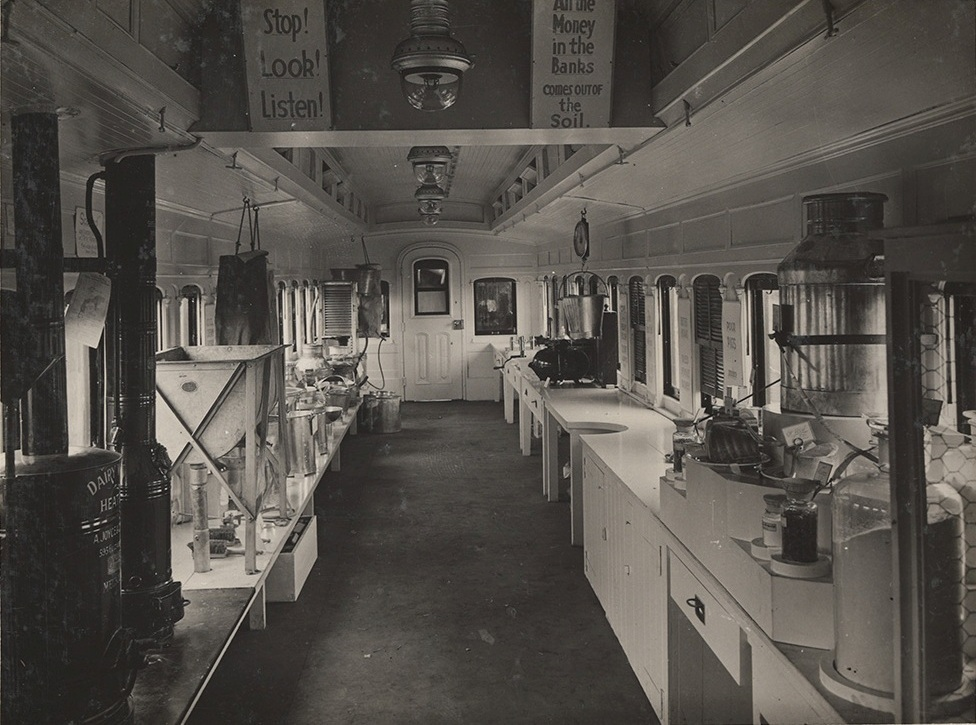
Dairy utensils car

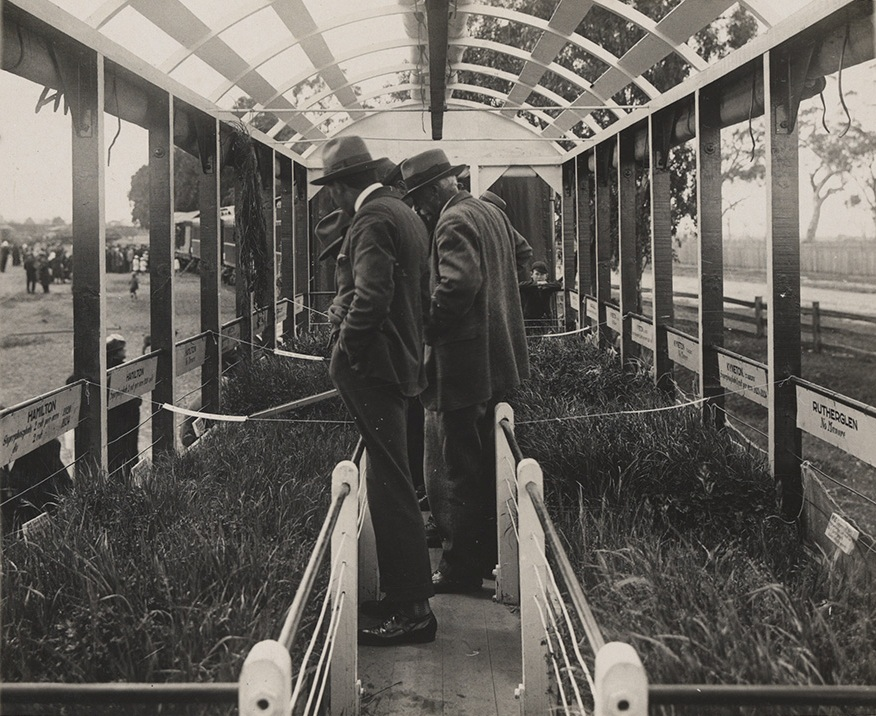
Growing pastures (Illustrating beneficial effects of superphosphates)

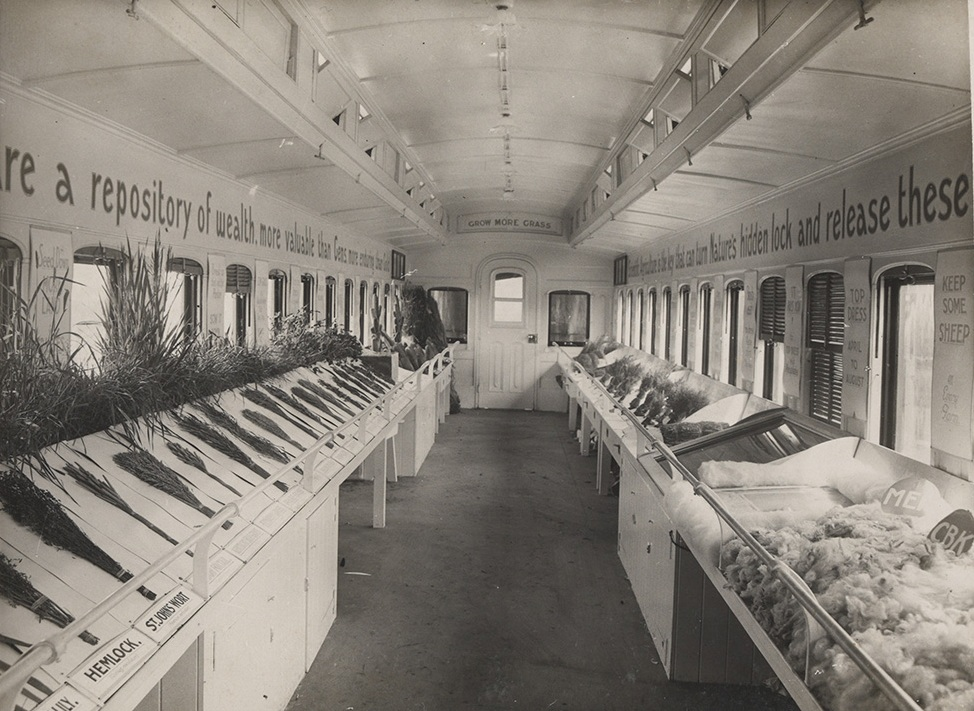
Noxious weeds, edible grasses and wool

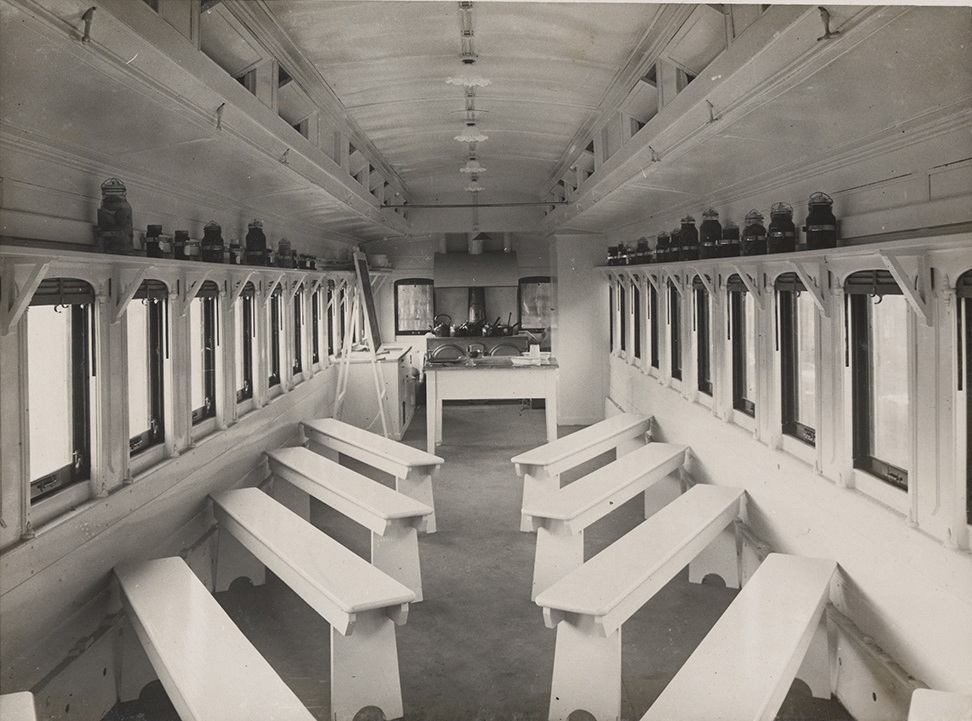
Cookery and needlewok demonstration car

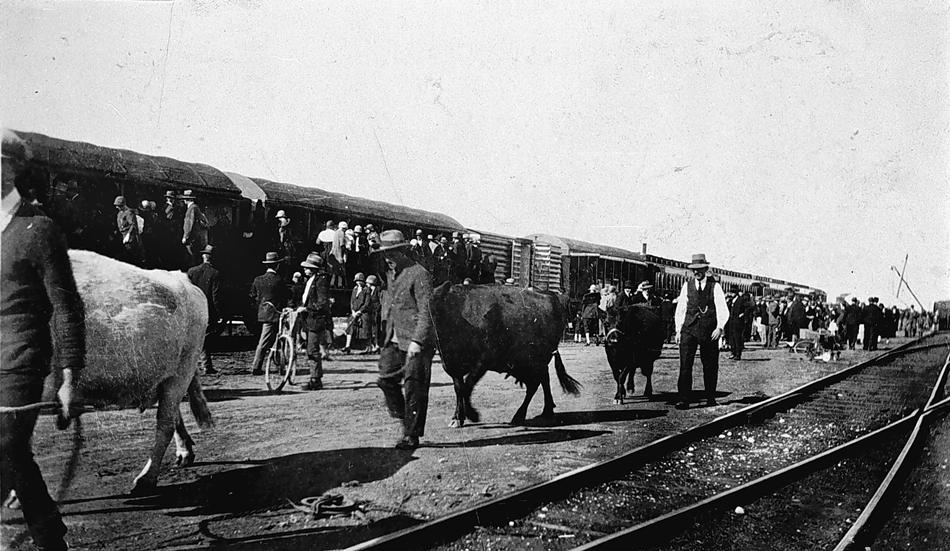
Better Farming Train at Mildura on 2 August 1926.

== See also ==
- Better Farming Train (Saskatchewan), Canadian inspiration for the Victorian train.
- Reso Train, National Resources Development train inspired by the Better Farming Train.
