= Elmore railway station =

Railway station in Victoria, Australia

Elmore
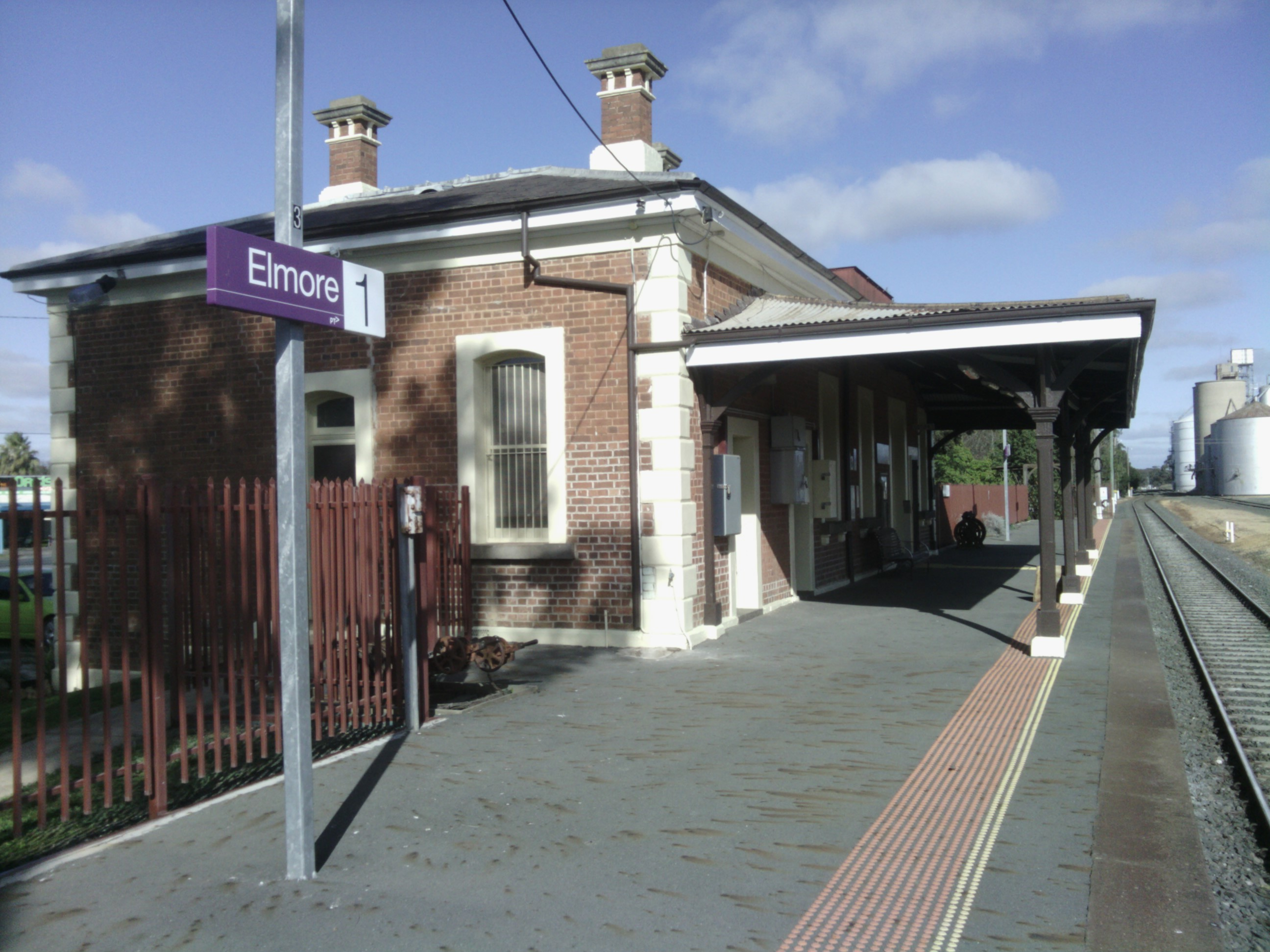
- Southbound view of the station building and platform, June 2015

General information
- Location: 61 Railway Road, Elmore, Victoria 3558; City of Greater Bendigo; Australia
- Coordinates: 36°29′42″S 144°36′28″E
- System: PTV regional rail station
- Owner: VicTrack
- Operator: V/Line
- Line: Echuca (Deniliquin)
- Distance: 206.69 kilometres from Southern Cross
- Platforms: 1
- Tracks: 2
- Connections: Coach

Construction
- Structure type: At-grade
- Accessible: Yes

Other information
- Status: Operational, unstaffed
- Station code: EME
- Fare zone: Myki zone 14
- Website: Public Transport Victoria

History
- Opened: 19 September 1864; 161 years ago
- Former names: Runnymede (1864-1876)

Services
One in both directions on weekdays, two on weekends
Preceding station	V/Line	Following station
Goornong towards Southern Cross	Echuca line	Rochester towards Echuca
Former services
Preceding station	Disused railways	Following station
Line open	Deniliquin line	Avonmore
Terminus	Cohuna line	Hunter towards Cohuna

Victorian Heritage Register
- Official name: Elmore Railway Station and Water Tower
- Designated: 20 August 1982
- Reference no.: H1672
Location
- Location within Victoria

Elmore railway station is located on the Deniliquin line in Victoria, Australia, and serves the town of the same name. The station opened on 19 September 1864 as Runnymede, but was renamed Elmore on 1 November 1876.

== History ==
Elmore was opened along with the line to Echuca. The station, like the township itself, was named after the Elmore Estate, which was part of the Burnewang pastoral run. The name was possibly inspired by the English town of Elmore, Gloucestershire.

In 1916, a 70-foot (21 m) turntable was provided at the station. The siding leading to the turntable was abolished in 1957. In 1976, the siding leading to the dock platform was abolished.

The station was the junction for the 57-mile (92 km) branch line to Cohuna, which was opened on 10 November 1915. The last section of the branch was closed in 1987, and the connection to it had been removed by July 1988.

In 2016/2017, the station was recorded as the least-used railway station in Victoria, with an average of 2.42 boardings per day.

A disused station, Avonmore, was located between Elmore and Goornong.

== Platforms and services ==
Elmore has one platform and is served by V/Line Echuca line trains.

Elmore platform arrangement
Platform	Line	Destination
1	Echuca line	Southern Cross, Echuca

== Transport links ==
Elmore is also served by a V/Line road coach route running between Bendigo and Moama.
