= Frank Comer =

Australian rules footballer

Personal information
- Full name: Francis Joseph Comer
- Born: 7 February 1886; Goornong, Victoria
- Died: 11 April 1948 (aged 62); Fitzroy, Victoria
- Original team: Perth / Boulder City

Playing career^{1}
Years	Club	Games (Goals)
1912	South Melbourne	2 (0)
- ^{1} Playing statistics correct to the end of 1912.

Francis Joseph Comer (7 February 1886 – 11 April 1948) was an Australian rules footballer who played with South Melbourne in the Victorian Football League (VFL).
