= Huntly railway station, Victoria =

Railway station in Huntly, Victoria, Australia

Huntly
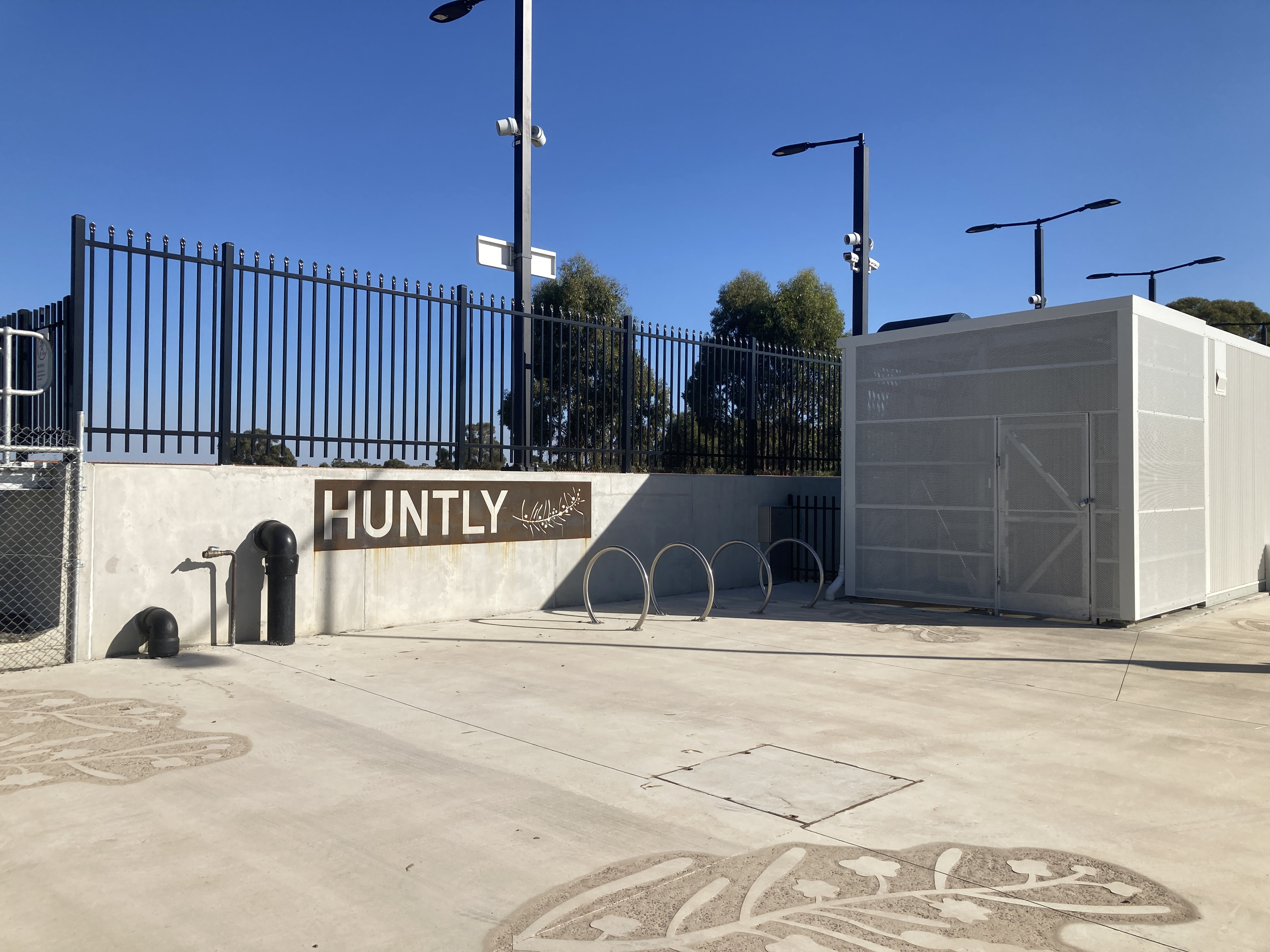
- Station forecourt and platform, March 2024

General information
- Location: Wakeman Road; Huntly, Victoria; City of Greater Bendigo; Australia
- Coordinates: 36°39′57″S 144°22′11″E
- System: PTV regional rail station
- Owner: VicTrack
- Operator: V/Line
- Line: Echuca (Deniliquin)
- Distance: 176.61 kilometres from Southern Cross
- Platforms: 1
- Tracks: 1

Construction
- Structure type: At-grade

Other information
- Status: Operational, unstaffed
- Fare zone: Myki zone 13/14
- Website: Public Transport Victoria

History
- Opened: 16 July 2022; 4 years ago

Services
Preceding station	V/Line	Following station
Epsom towards Southern Cross	Echuca line	Goornong towards Echuca
Former services
Preceding station	Disused railways	Following station
Epsom	Deniliquin line (line open)	Bagshot
Location
- Location within Victoria

Huntly railway station is a railway station located on the Deniliquin line in Victoria, Australia. Situated west of the Wakeman Road level crossing, It serves the town of Huntly and it opened on 16 July 2022 as part of the Regional Rail Revival project.

== History ==
On the 19th of September 1864, the Deniliquin line opened from Bendigo to Echuca, passing the site of the then non existent Huntly Station.

The first Huntly station opened on the 1st of October, 1889. It closed on the 18th of October 1954.

Construction of the new station platforms started in Late November 2021, with the new Huntly station opened the following year on the 3rd of June, 2022. The previous disused Huntly station is located west of the new station.

Disused stations Bagshot and Wellsford are located between Huntly and Goornong.

== Platforms and services ==
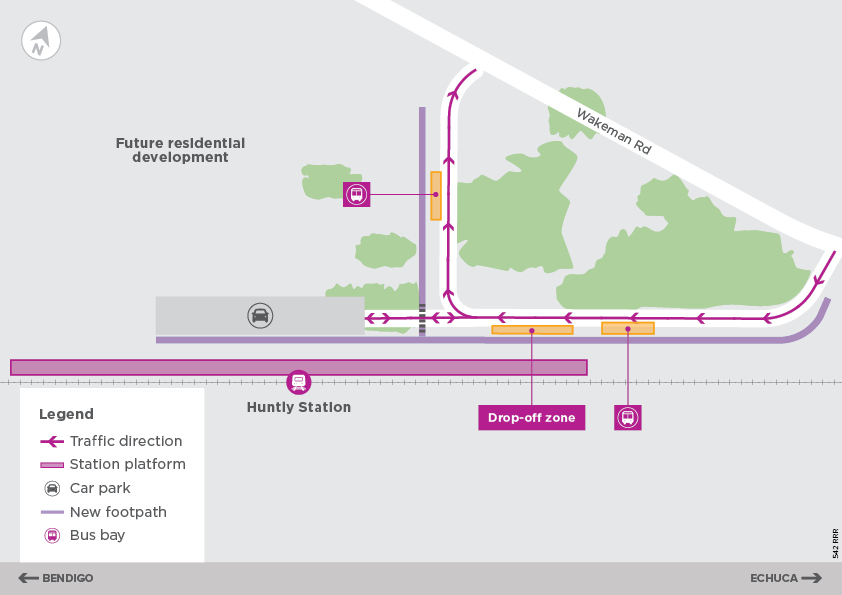
Concept map of Huntly railway station

Huntly has one platform, and is served by Echuca line trains.

Despite the station being served by Echuca line trains only, which usually require a paper ticket to travel on, passengers have to use a valid Myki to get to or from the station (as well as Goornong railway station).

Huntly platform arrangement
Platform	Line	Destination
1	Echuca line	Southern Cross, Echuca

== Gallery ==
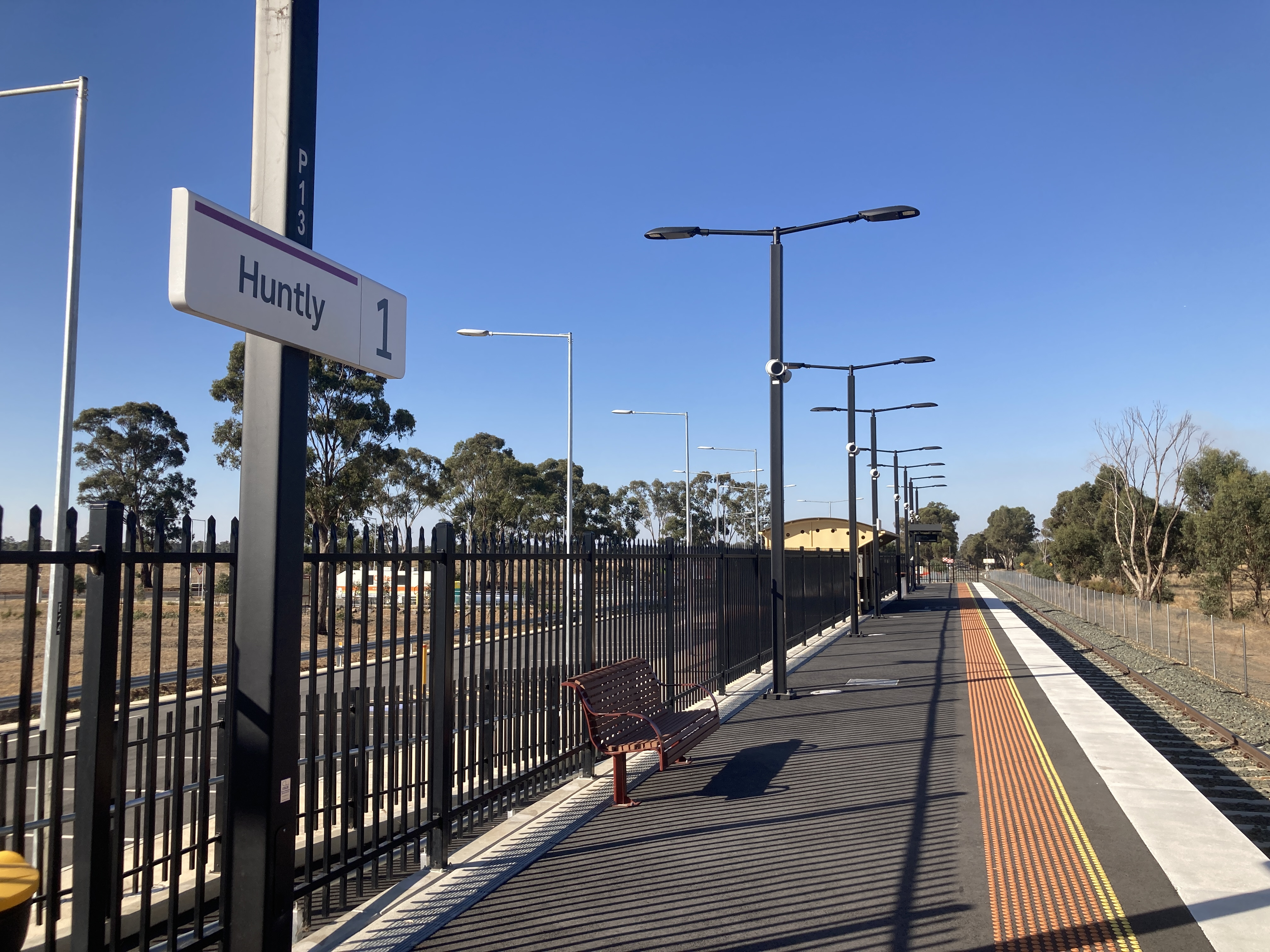
Station platform, March 2024

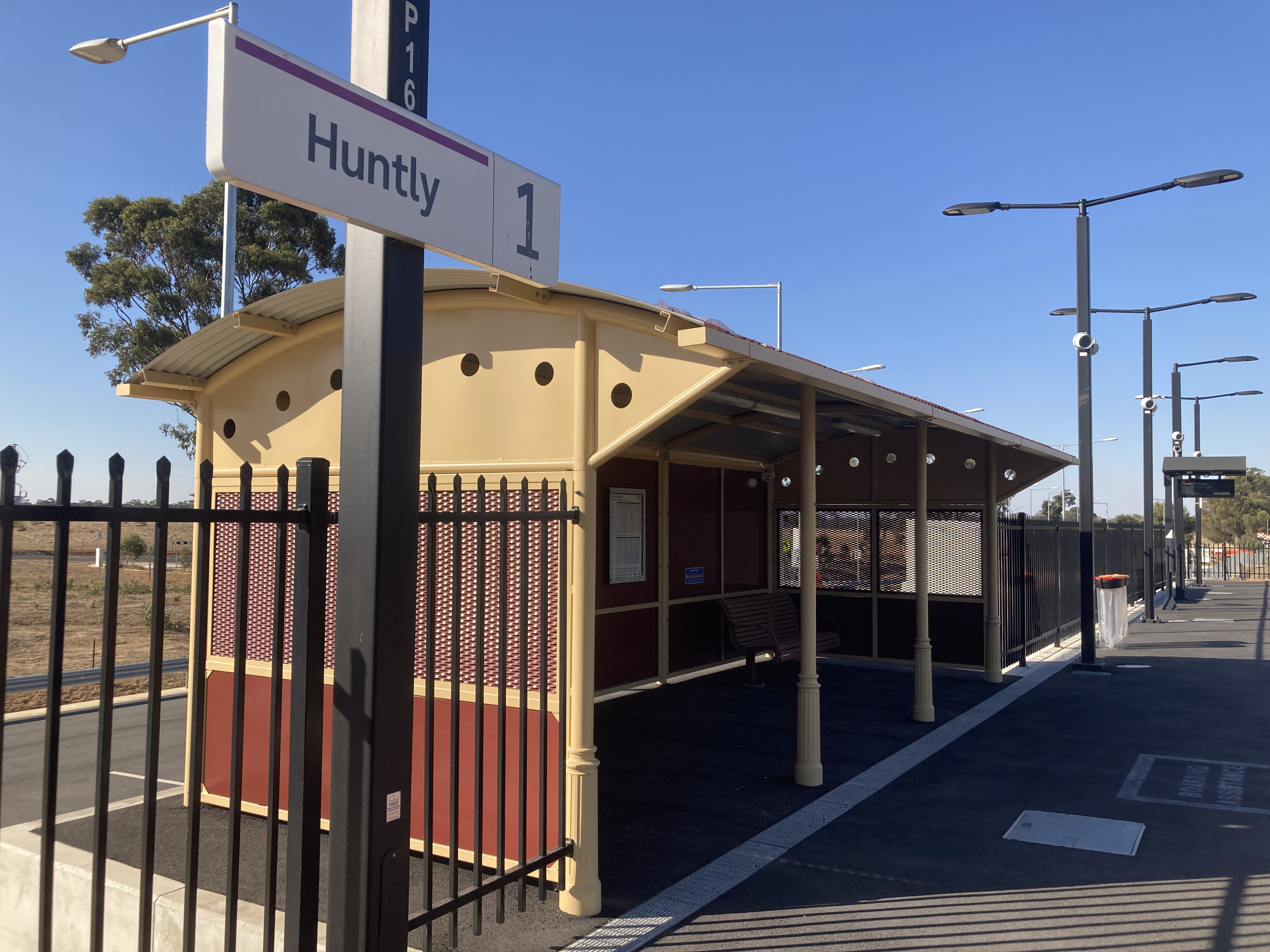
Waiting shelter, March 2024

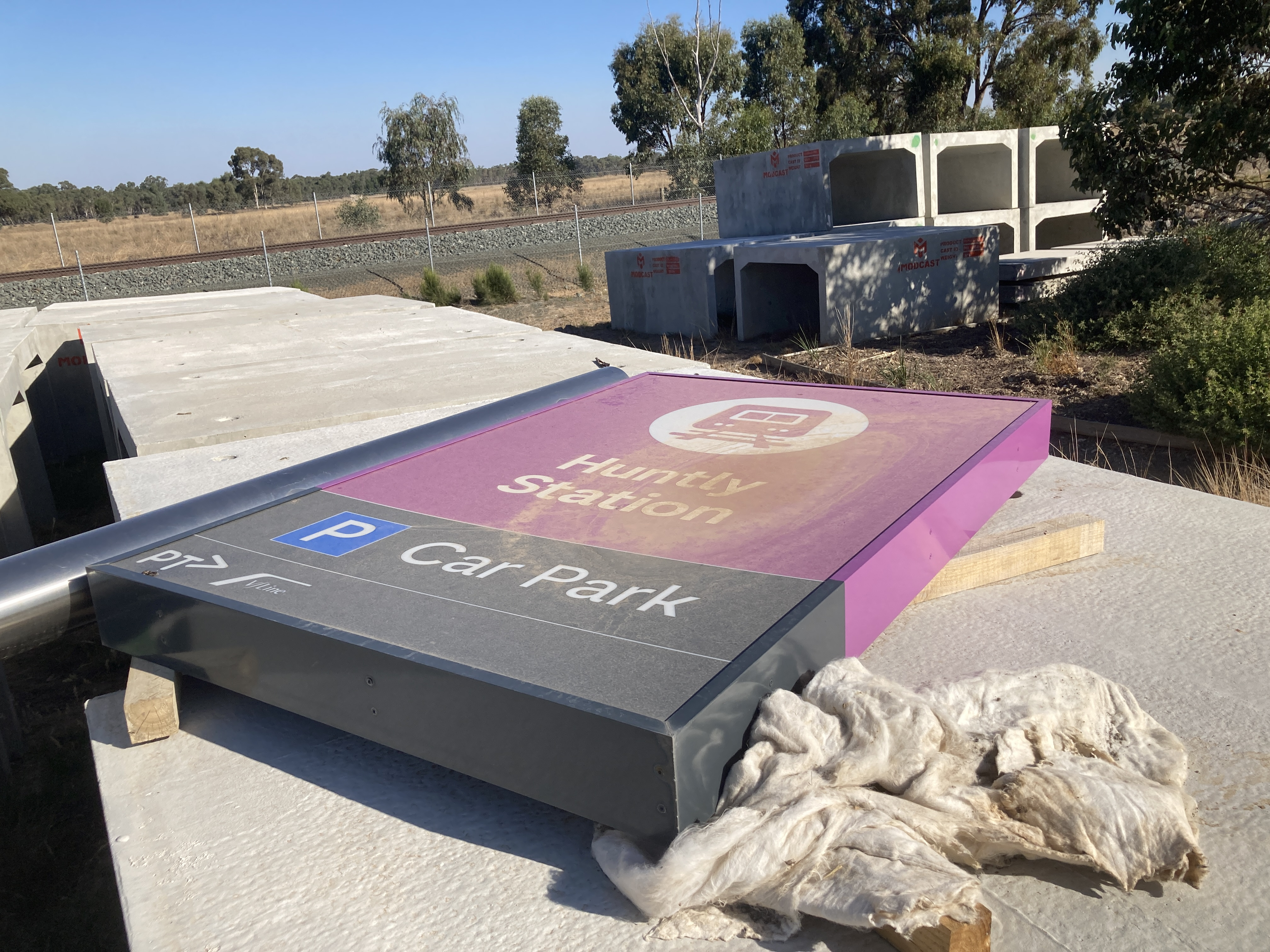
Station signage to be installed, March 2024
