= Reso Train =

Overview
- Service type: Passenger train
- First service: 28 August 1922
- Former operator(s): Victorian Railways

Technical
- Track gauge: 1,600 mm (5 ft 3 in)

The Reso Train, officially the State Resources Train, was a train operated by the Victorian Railways to bring business leaders from Melbourne and regional Victoria together. The concept was promoted by Harold Clapp, Chairman of Commissioners of the Victorian Railways with the city leaders travelling on the train to various parts of the state. The first train ran to Swan Hill and Mildura in August 1922. It was complemented by the Better Farming Train from 1924.

A typical consist in 1934, when the train was making its 22nd journey, accommodated 60 passengers, with the train made up of a parlor car, three sleeping carriages, a dining car, an office car, a staff car and a van. Tours ceased with the outbreak of World War II, before resuming in May 1947.

In the August 1954 edition of the Victorian Railways News Letter, the train was described as having four or five sleeping cars, plus an unidentified 42-seater dining car, the original Norman, the "shower car" Carey, the dining car Goulburn, and possibly a brake van.

A typical itinerary is demonstrated by the 53rd journey of the train, in March 1959. It left Melbourne on a five-day journey, with the passengers visiting the Hume Dam, Rutherglen Research Station, Mount Buffalo National Park, the Kiewa Hydroelectric Scheme, and the rayon and wool industries of Wangaratta.
