= Goornong railway station =

Railway station in Victoria, Australia

Goornong
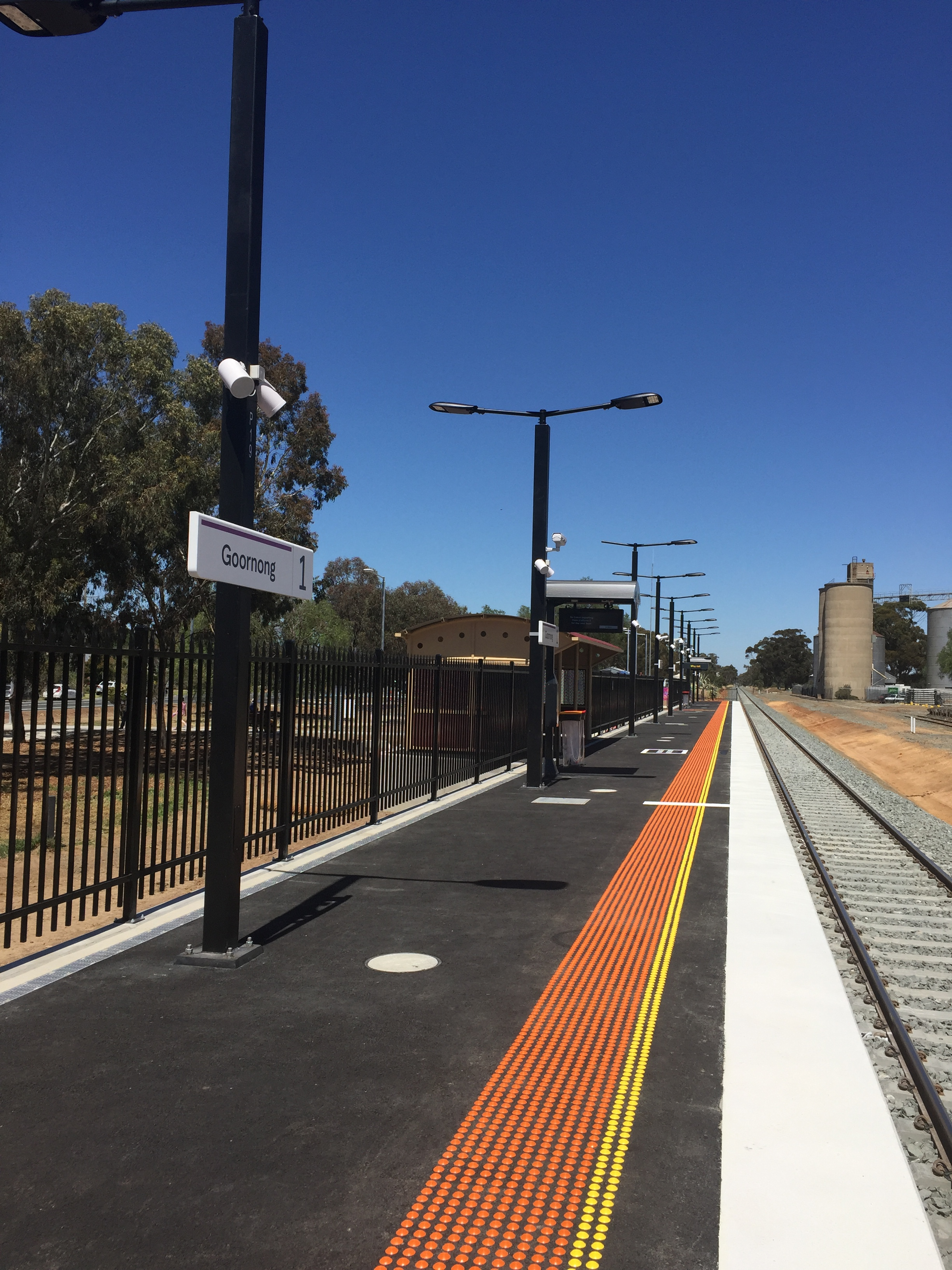
- Southbound view from platform, December 2021

General information
- Location: Midland Highway, Goornong, Victoria 3557; City of Greater Bendigo; Australia
- Coordinates: 36°36′55″S 144°30′13″E
- System: PTV regional rail station
- Owner: VicTrack
- Operator: V/Line
- Line: Echuca (Deniliquin)
- Distance: 189.75 kilometres from Southern Cross
- Platforms: 1
- Tracks: 1
- Train operators: V/Line

Construction
- Structure type: At grade
- Parking: Yes
- Accessible: Yes

Other information
- Status: Operational, unstaffed
- Station code: GON
- Fare zone: Myki zone 13/14
- Website: Public Transport Victoria

History
- Opened: 12 December 2021; 4 years ago

Services
Preceding station	V/Line	Following station
Huntly towards Southern Cross	Echuca line	Elmore towards Echuca
Former services
Preceding station	Disused railways	Following station
Wellsford	Deniliquin line (line open)	Avonmore
Location
- Location within Victoria

Goornong railway station is located on the Deniliquin line in Victoria, Australia. It serves the town of Goornong, and it opened on 12 December 2021.

Originally closing in 1979, it was re-opened on 12 December 2021, as part of the Regional Rail Revival project.

Disused stations Bagshot and Wellsford are located between Goornong and Huntly, while disused station Avonmore is located between Goornong and Elmore.

== History ==
Goornong originally opened on 19 September 1864, along with the line to Echuca, and closed on 4 June 1979. On 5 August 2008, a petition was presented to the City of Greater Bendigo council, signed by 175 Goornong residents, calling for a railway platform to be built at Goornong. On 31 August 2018, the Victorian Labor Government announced that, if it was re-elected at the 2018 state election, a station would be provided at Goornong by 2021, as part of the Bendigo metro rail project. Labor was ultimately re-elected, winning 55 of the 88 seats in the Victorian Legislative Assembly.

On 31 July 2020, a concept map of the proposed station was released. On 19 May 2021, it was announced that site investigations had begun at Goornong and that the contract for the construction of the station had been awarded to Symal Infrastructure. On 30 July 2021, the Australian and Victorian governments jointly announced that "critical works including track alignment and platform construction" would take place at Goornong, with the station set to open "by the end of the year". Between September and October 2021, track upgrades were performed between Epsom station and Goornong, to allow an increase in track speed from 80 km/h to 130 km/h. An artist's impression of the station was released in August 2021.

On 5 November 2021, the Victorian Government announced that trains would begin stopping at Goornong from 12 December 2021.

On 16 July 2022, with the opening of Huntly railway station, passengers had to start using a valid Myki to travel on the Echuca line to get to and from Goornong station.

== Platforms and services ==
Goornong has one platform, and is served by Echuca line trains.

Goornong platform arrangement
Platform	Line	Destination
1	Echuca line	Southern Cross, Echuca

== Gallery ==
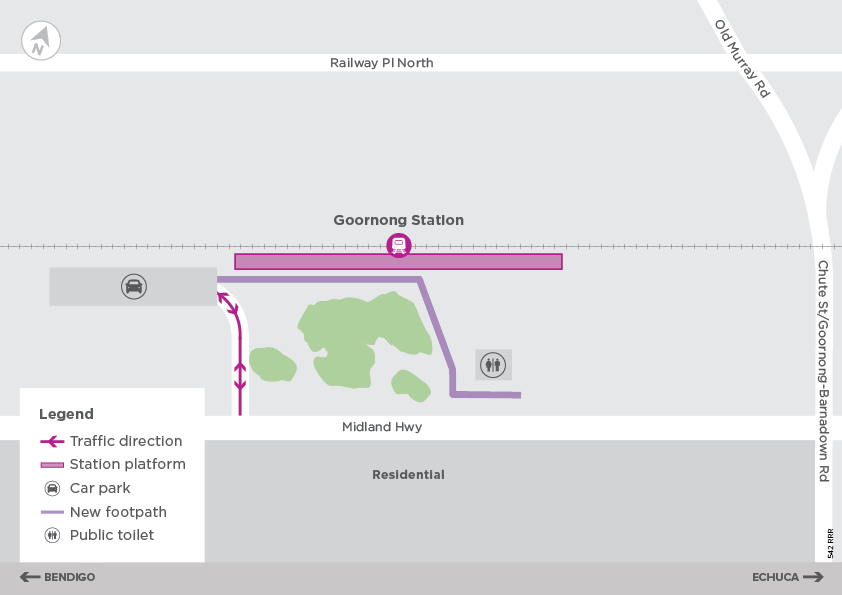
Concept map of Goornong station, released in
July 2020

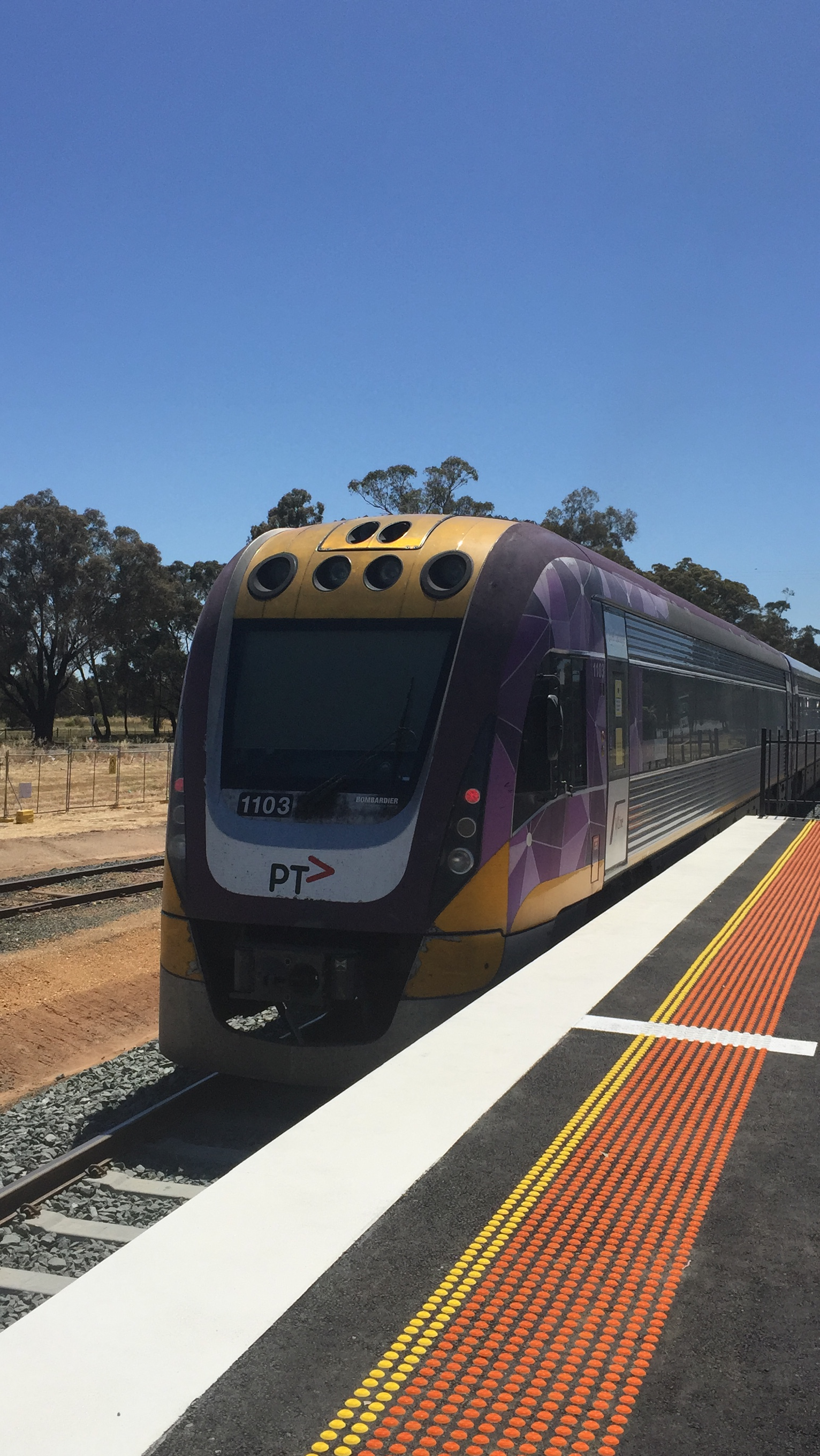
VLocity train leaving Goornong, December 2021

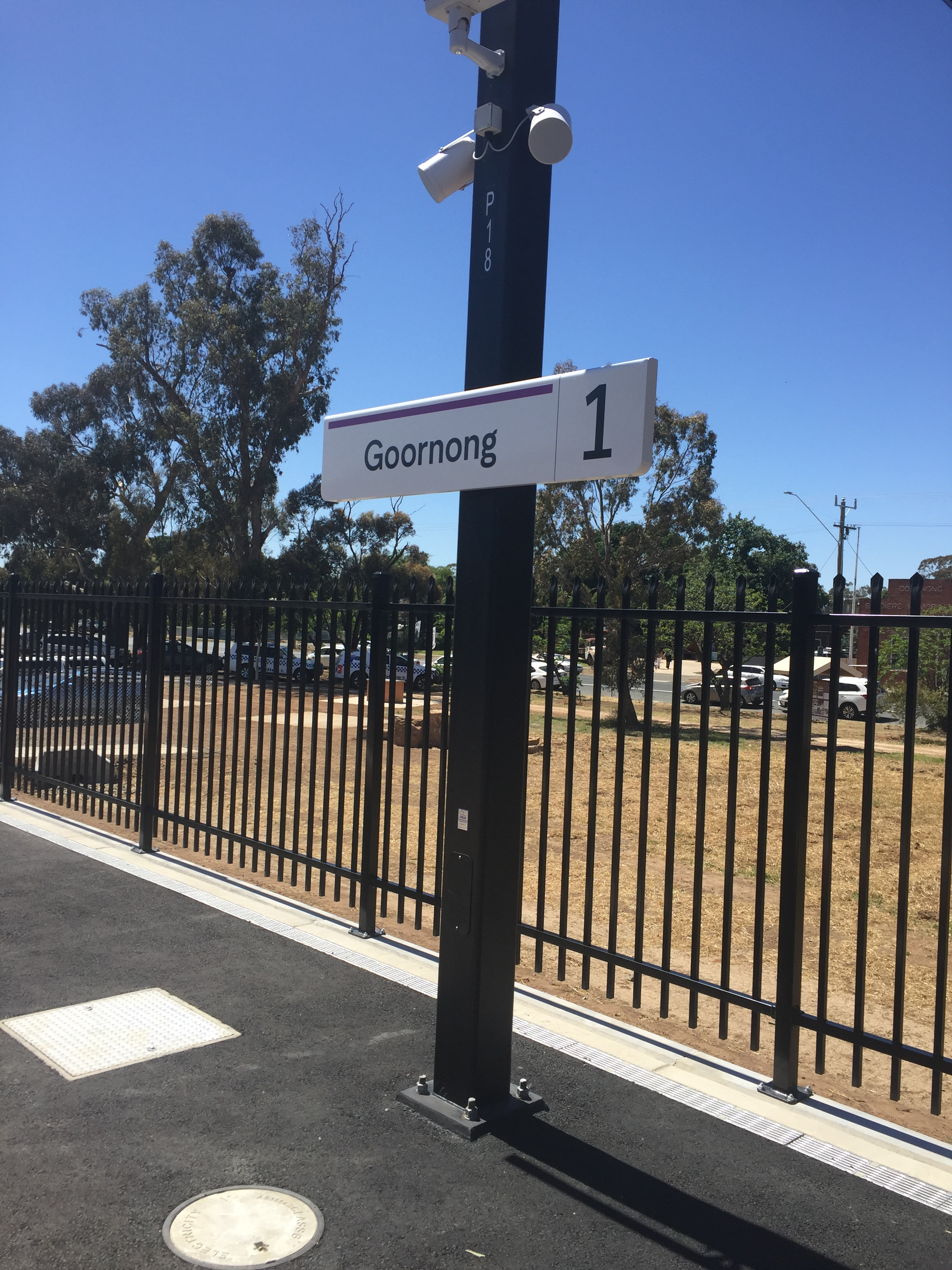
Platform signage at Goornong station,
December 2021
