= Harold Winthrop Clapp =

Australian transport administrator

Sir Harold Winthrop Clapp KBE
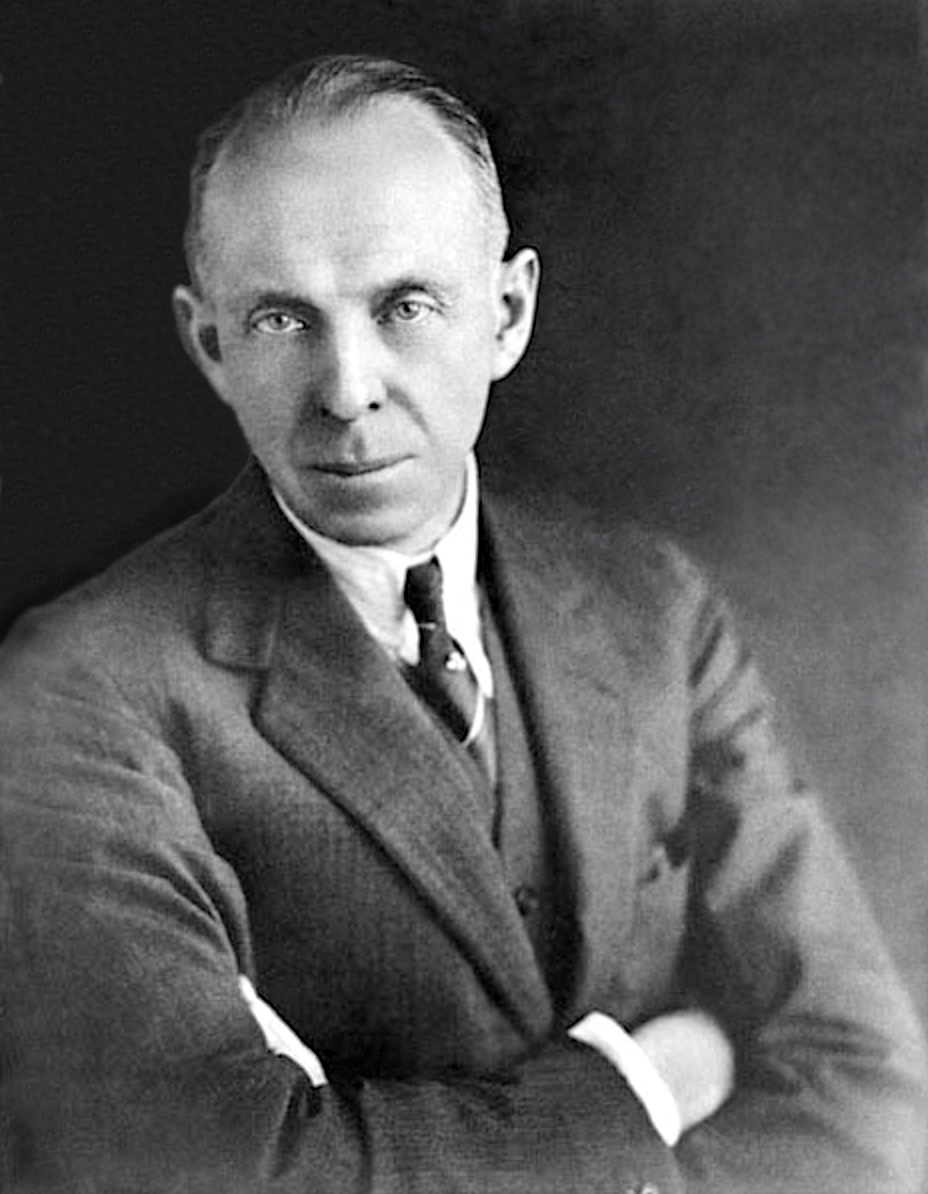
- Born: 7 May 1875; St Kilda, Victoria, Australia
- Died: 21 October 1952 (aged 77); East Melbourne, Victoria, Australia
- Occupations: Vice President, Southern Pacific Railroad Chairman of Commissioners, Victorian Railways Director-General, Commonwealth Land Transport Board
- Spouse: Gertrude Vivien

Sir Harold Winthrop Clapp KBE (7 May 1875 – 21 October 1952) was a transport administrator who over the course of thirty years had a profound effect on Australia's railway network. In two decades as its Chairman of Commissioners, he revolutionised Victorian Railways, with unprecedented attention to customer service and innovations such as more powerful locomotives, air-conditioned carriages, and faster services culminating in the introduction of the flagship Spirit of Progress express train. Seconded to the federal government in World War II, he played a pivotal role in the manufacture of fighter aircraft in the defence of Australia. As Director-General of Australia's Land Transport Board, he presented a report on railway gauge standardisation that ultimately led to the eventual linking of all Australian mainland capital cities by a uniform track gauge.

== Early life and career abroad ==
Born in St Kilda, Victoria, Harold Clapp was the son of Cobb and Co coach operator and future Melbourne Tramway and Omnibus Company owner Francis Boardman Clapp and wife Isabella Pinnock, née Pierce. He was educated at Brighton Grammar and Melbourne Church of England Grammar schools, before serving an apprenticeship at the Austral Otis Engineering Co. and later taking charge of motive power in his father's Brisbane Tramway Co. Ltd.

In 1900 Clapp left for the United States of America, first obtaining work at the General Electric Co. He was then engaged by the Interborough Rapid Transit Co., and among other work was in charge of electrification of the West Jersey and Seashore division of the Pennsylvania Railroad. On 19 September 1906 at Providence, Rhode Island, he married Gertrude Vivien, daughter of Judge Arthur Noel of Brisbane. In 1908 he moved to Columbus, Ohio and joined the Southern Pacific Railroad. By 1920, he was a Vice President of the Southern Pacific, as well as the Columbus Railway Power and Light Co and Illinois' East St. Louis and Suburban Railway.

== Victorian Railways career ==
Premier Harry Lawson appointed Clapp as Chairman of the Commissioners of Victorian Railways in September 1920 on the recommendation of former Chairman Sir Thomas James Tait, who had known Clapp prior to his move to the United States. With an annual salary of £5,000, Clapp was Australia's highest-paid public servant at the time.

Clapp arrived in September 1920, and began an extraordinary period of reform of Victorian Railways. During his tenure, timetables were improved, larger and more powerful locomotives were built, services were improved, and the VR expanded operations into everything from motor coach services, a ski chalet, and creches to bakeries and raisin bread marketing.

=== Management style ===
Clapp enjoyed cordial relations with his staff, union officials, and was fortunate to have the support of highly capable Railways Ministers from both sides of politics, including future Premier of Victoria John Cain and future Prime Minister of Australia Robert Menzies.

Harold Clapp famously quipped that "The railway is ninety-five percent men and five percent iron." He was possessed of a remarkable memory and learnt the names and faces of many thousands of railway employees. He regarded stationmasters, who dealt with the public at many levels, as "his front line soldiers". Although his approach to industrial relations has been judged as paternalistic, his concern for workers' conditions was genuine and he was personally responsible for improvements such as better sanitation facilities and the provision of decent cafeterias at Newport Workshops.

Harold Clapp's fastidiousness for cleanliness was legendary. He was reputed to polish his shoes up to eight times a day, was renowned for running a finger along high shelves of country railway stations checking for dust, and earned the nickname "Clever Mary", after a popular brand of household cleaning product of the time.

Clapp's cleanliness was matched by his punctuality, a quality he expected in his employees and in his railway. Improvements in service reliability earned the ultimate compliment by way of the following complaint published in a Melbourne newspaper: "Mr Clapp's fiendish efficiency means that we have lost another excuse for being late for work in the mornings."

His normally unsmiling face masked the fact that Clapp did have a sense of humour. He shared his awareness of people making use of his surname's unfortunate association with "the clap", a sexually transmitted infection: when addressing a group of railwaymen he said, "I know what you fellows call me behind my back. My brother has a farm at Ouyen. One day, he called in at the railway station and found the stationmaster and porter cleaning up the place. When my brother asked them what they were doing, the stationmaster replied, 'Didn't you know? The Bloody Disease is coming tomorrow for an inspection.'"

=== The "Reso" and Better Farming Trains ===
Clapp was notable for his support and assistance to the farming sector. This reflected not only a desire to boost rail traffic through increased farm production and customer demand, but also a belief that the role and social responsibilities of the Victorian Railways as an organisation went far greater than simply the provision of transport. To this end, he introduced two special trains with the aim of developing the rural economy of Victoria, the Better Farming Train and the Reso Train (for Victorian National Resources Development). These trains served to link up businessmen with primary producers and develop entrepreneurial relationships, as well as educate farmers on the latest developments and best practices in agricultural science.

=== Motive power improvements ===
Victorian Railways Petrol Electric railmotor, introduced in 1928

At the time that Harold Clapp took over, the VR goods locomotive fleet was almost completely of 19th century designs that were largely obsolete. Clapp set about modernising the fleet, firstly with construction commencing in 1921 of 25 further examples of the prototype C class heavy goods locomotive of 1918, as well as introducing three new classes of locomotive which proved to be of highly successful design, the K class and N class light-lines locomotives of 1922 and 1925, and the X class heavy goods locomotive of 1929. With a large fleet of relatively new A2 class locomotives available, there was far less development of new passenger locomotives during the Clapp era. Even so, the two classes that were ordered during his time (the 3-cylinder S and H classes) were of unprecedented size, power and technical innovation.

As an efficiency measure, Clapp dispensed with the "Canadian Red" locomotive livery introduced by his predecessor Sir Thomas Tait, replacing it with a plain black livery that required less cleaning. In other key developments that drew on his US railroad experience, he oversaw the introduction of electric lighting on VR locomotives and the fitting of auto-couplers.

Clapp also oversaw the introduction of important innovations in alternative motive power. These included the E class electric suburban goods locomotives and the introduction of rail motors to provide faster, more cost effective services than steam locomotives.

=== Improved timetables ===
Clapp focused on accelerating timetables, in many cases achieving considerable savings (and even more considerable favourable publicity for Victorian Railways) simply through better utilisation of existing technology. He introduced Victoria's first "named train", the Geelong Flier in May 1926, which cut the journey time between Melbourne and Geelong to just one hour, using existing rolling stock hauled by an A2 class locomotive of 1907 design. In 1935 Clapp raised the maximum line speed limit on Victorian Railways from 60 to 70 mph (96 to 112 km/h) and the Flier subsequently ran to Geelong on a 55-minute timetable. The public relations success of the Flier was reflected by the train's name entering the local lexicon as a metaphor for speed; former Geelong Football Club player Bob Davis was nicknamed "The Geelong Flier"; and even in 2005 current player David Wojcinski was said to "run like the Geelong Flier of yesteryear".

Similarly, the Adelaide Express was renamed The Overland in 1926, despite some reluctance from the South Australian authorities who jointly ran the inter-capital service. Clapp oversaw the reduction in running time for the service from sixteen and a half hours in 1928 to around fourteen hours in 1938 (with the departure time changed from 4:30pm to a much more convenient 7:00pm), achieved at very moderate cost simply through the introduction of Automatic Staff Exchange equipment between Ballarat and Serviceton to allow unimpeded progress from one track section to the next, and design improvements to the existing A2 class locomotive fleet to increase power and efficiency.

=== Spirit of Progress ===
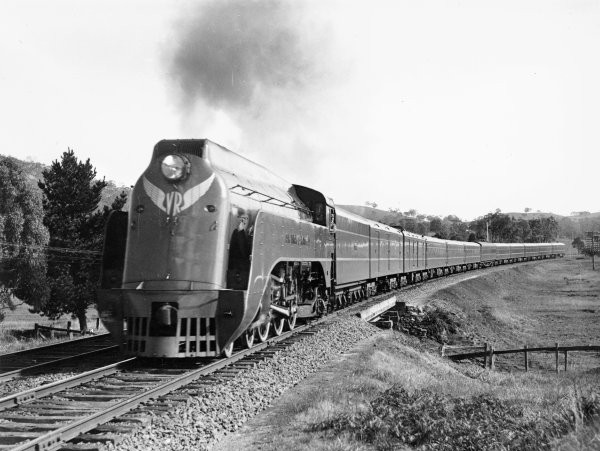
The Spirit of Progress headed by locomotive S301 Sir Thomas Mitchell in 1938

In 1934, Clapp toured Europe and North America to investigate new developments in rail technology such as diesel locomotives. On his return, he began work on his ultimate project, upgrade of the Sydney Limited service into the all-steel, all-air-conditioned, non-stop, high-speed express streamliner, Spirit of Progress.

Clapp's decision to invest considerable funds into Spirit of Progress was based on entirely pragmatic considerations. In an age before interstate air travel was common, politicians and heads of industry rode between Australia's two largest capital cities and the national capital Canberra by train. The upgrade of the service was then a smart investment in promoting the Victorian Railways brand and its reputation to the nation's most powerful and influential people.

The train was truly world class, running non-stop along its entire 190.5-mile (306.5 km) length at an average speed of 52 mph (83 km/h) between Albury and Melbourne, a speed comparable to that of the legendary Flying Scotsman service of the London and North Eastern Railway. Harold Clapp's personal involvement in its design and construction was all-encompassing, from the auto-couplers connecting the carriages to the Art Deco interior design.

Clapp's time at Victorian Railways is often viewed as being the halcyon days for the organisation. However, during Clapp's tenure the VR was already struggling to match new competition from road transport, as well as to remain profitable despite the legacy of a network of short, inefficient branch lines built in the late 19th century for reasons of political expediency rather than economic merit, challenges that were to bedevil Clapp's successors. The VR only turned a profit in two of the nearly twenty years that he was at its helm.

== Wartime aviation production ==
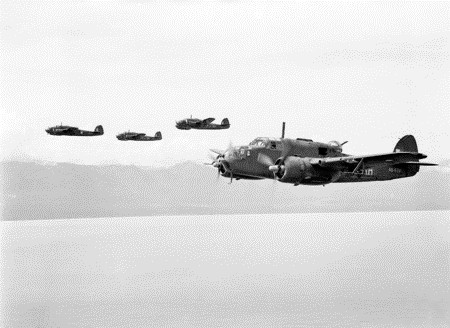
Four Australian Beauforts of No. 100 Squadron RAAF near the New Guinea coast in early 1945

In May 1939, with the outbreak of World War II imminent, Clapp was seconded by then Prime Minister Robert Menzies to become general manager of the Aircraft Construction Branch of the Commonwealth Department of Supply and Development, overseeing the construction of Bristol Beaufort bombers in Australia. He was made chairman of the new Aircraft Production Commission in March next year.

Although Beaufort bombers were advanced aluminium aircraft requiring complex and previously untried assembly processes, the first flew as early as August 1941. During 1942 they were delivered at the rate of sixteen per month and in 1943 at 29 per month. The last of 700 was delivered in August 1944, by which time production had shifted to Beaufighter fighter-bomber, of which 364 were completed by the end of the war.

Clapp was appointed a Knight Commander of the Order of the British Empire (KBE) in the 1941 New Year Honours "[f]or public services in the Commonwealth of Australia."

== Commonwealth Land Transport Board ==
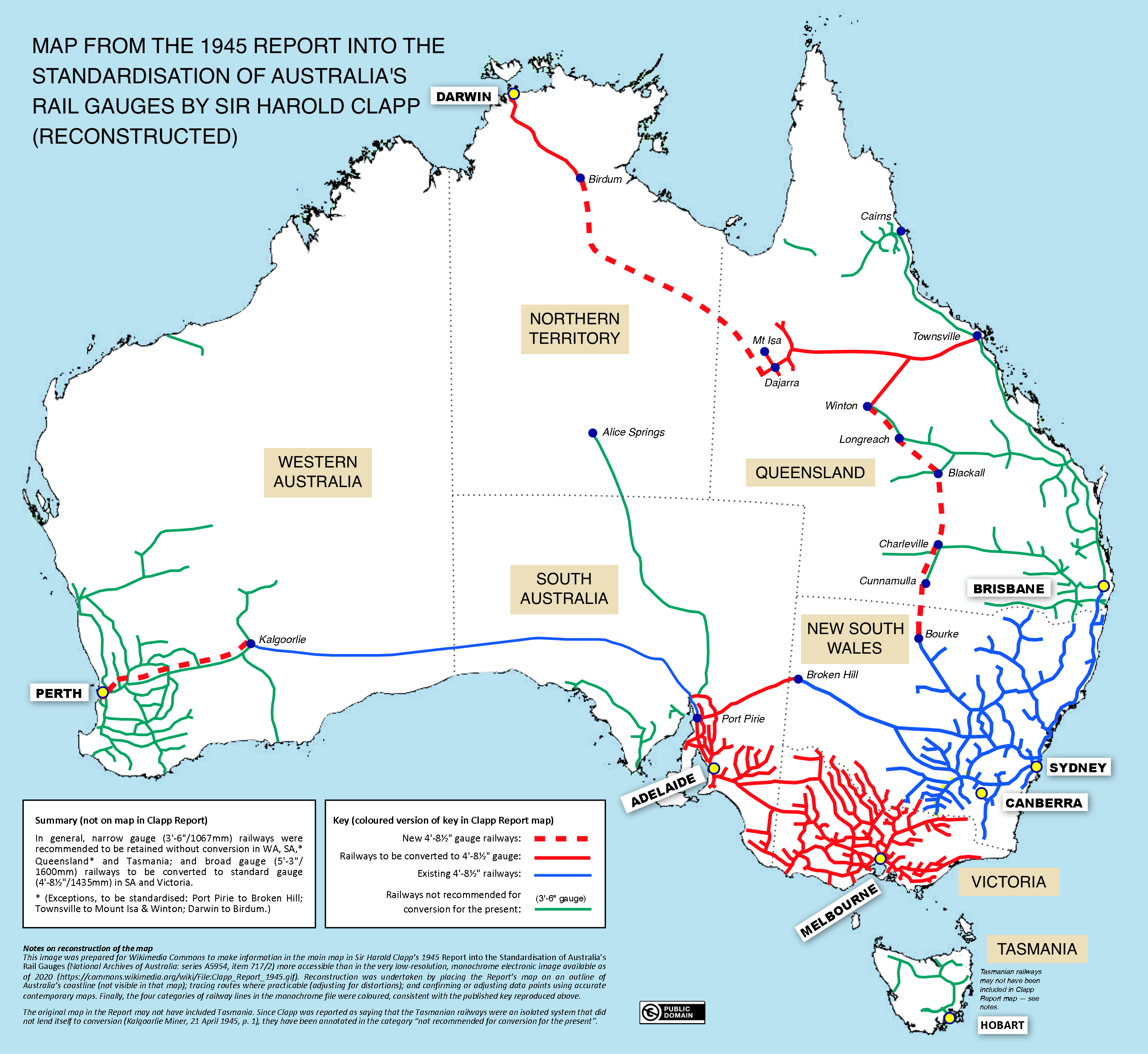
Clapp's 1945 proposals for standardisation of Australia's railway gauges

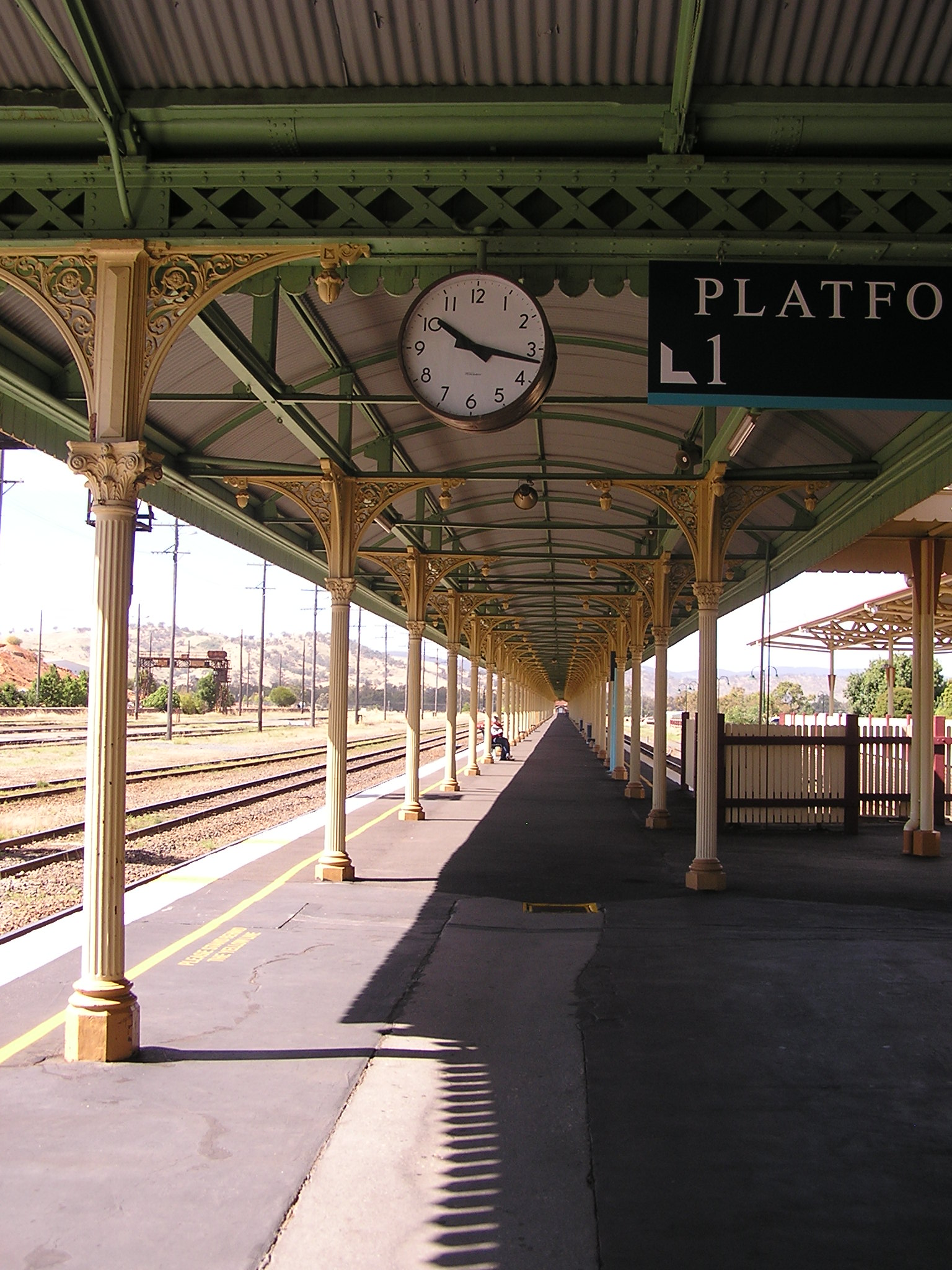
The break-of-gauge platform for the Sydney–Melbourne railway at Albury station, where passengers disembarked from broad gauge trains from Melbourne to board standard gauge trains to Sydney

In February 1942, Clapp was appointed Director-General of Land Transport by the Curtin Government to co-ordinate Commonwealth and State road and rail transport. In 1944, he was asked to prepare a report on the standardisation of track gauges in Australia.

The Second World War, in generating greatly increased rail traffic through the shipment of men, munitions and supplies around the country, exposed the inefficiency of a national rail system built on several systems built to different gauges. Multiple break-of-gauge points across the country between 1,067 mm (3 ft 6 in) narrow gauge, 1,435 mm (4 ft 8 1/2 in) standard gauge and 1,600 mm (5 ft 3 in) broad gauge compromised the ability of the railways to support the war effort and required upwards of 1,600 men at various break-of-gauge points to transfer cargo from one train to another.

Clapp submitted a national rail plan for the complete conversion of the Victorian and South Australian broad-gauge networks to standard gauge, the conversion of the Silverton Tramway and south-east South Australian narrow gauge lines to standard gauge, and the linking of Perth to Kalgoorlie by a new standard gauge link, at a cost of £44,318,000. He further recommended and the linking of Darwin to the national network via a new standard gauge link to be built from Queensland at a cost of £10,898,000, and a new inland standard gauge link through New South Wales and Queensland, cost £21,565,000.

Parochial state interests thwarted the plan from being adopted. New South Wales refused to ratify the agreement as only a relatively small proportion of the project cost would be spent in NSW, where almost all track was already standard gauge. South Australia objected to the Darwin link being built from Queensland rather than extending the existing Central Australia Railway link from Adelaide to Alice Springs.

Clapp's report was used in 1956 as a basis for further recommendations by the Government Members Rail Standardisation Committee chaired by William Wentworth, which concluded that "while there may be considerable doubts as to the justification for undertaking large-scale standardisation of Australian railways under present circumstances, there can be no doubt that the standardisation of main trunk lines is not only justified, but long overdue." By 1962, Melbourne was linked to Sydney by a standard gauge link, and by 1970 the standardisation of the transcontinental link from Sydney to Perth was completed.

Another key element of Clapp's 1945 proposal was delivered, at least in part, with the standardisation of the broad gauge Crystal Brook line connecting Adelaide to the transcontinental Sydney–Perth railway in 1982, followed by the standardisation of South Australia's non-metropolitan broad gauge network and most of the broad gauge network in western Victoria in 1995, including the main Melbourne-Adelaide railway.

== Retirement and death ==
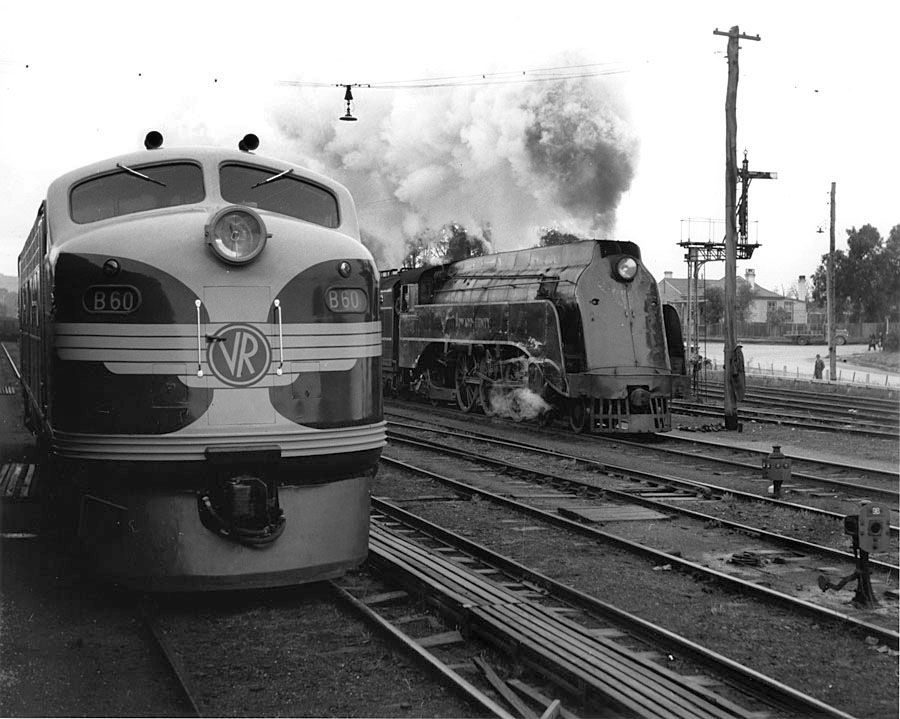
Locomotive B 60, later named Harold W. Clapp, on its delivery run to Melbourne is passed by one of Clapp's earlier S class streamliners

In September 1951 Clapp resigned for health reasons but continued to act as a consultant to the Department of Shipping and Transport. On 14 July 1952 the first of the B class diesel electric locomotives, which were to revolutionise train operations in Victoria, was delivered to the VR and travelled from NSW to Melbourne's Spencer Street station under its own power. The elderly Harold Clapp climbed into the cab of locomotive B 60 and sat at the controls, and was honoured by having the new locomotive named after him.

On 21 October 1952 he died in hospital, leaving behind his wife, two sons and a daughter. Tributes were paid by many, including Prime Minister Robert Menzies. Journalist C. R. Bradish described him as "a remarkable man", with "sufficient power and imagination to give the Victorian Railways a reputation they had never known before".
