= Cohuna railway line =

Closed railway line in Victoria, Australia

Cohuna

Overview
- Stations: 10

Service
- Type: Victorian Railways passenger and freight services

History
- Opened: 10 November 1915
- Closed: 1 March 1981: Diggora West—Cohuna; 8 December 1986: Elmore—Diggora West

Technical
- Line length: 57 miles (92 km)
- Number of tracks: 1

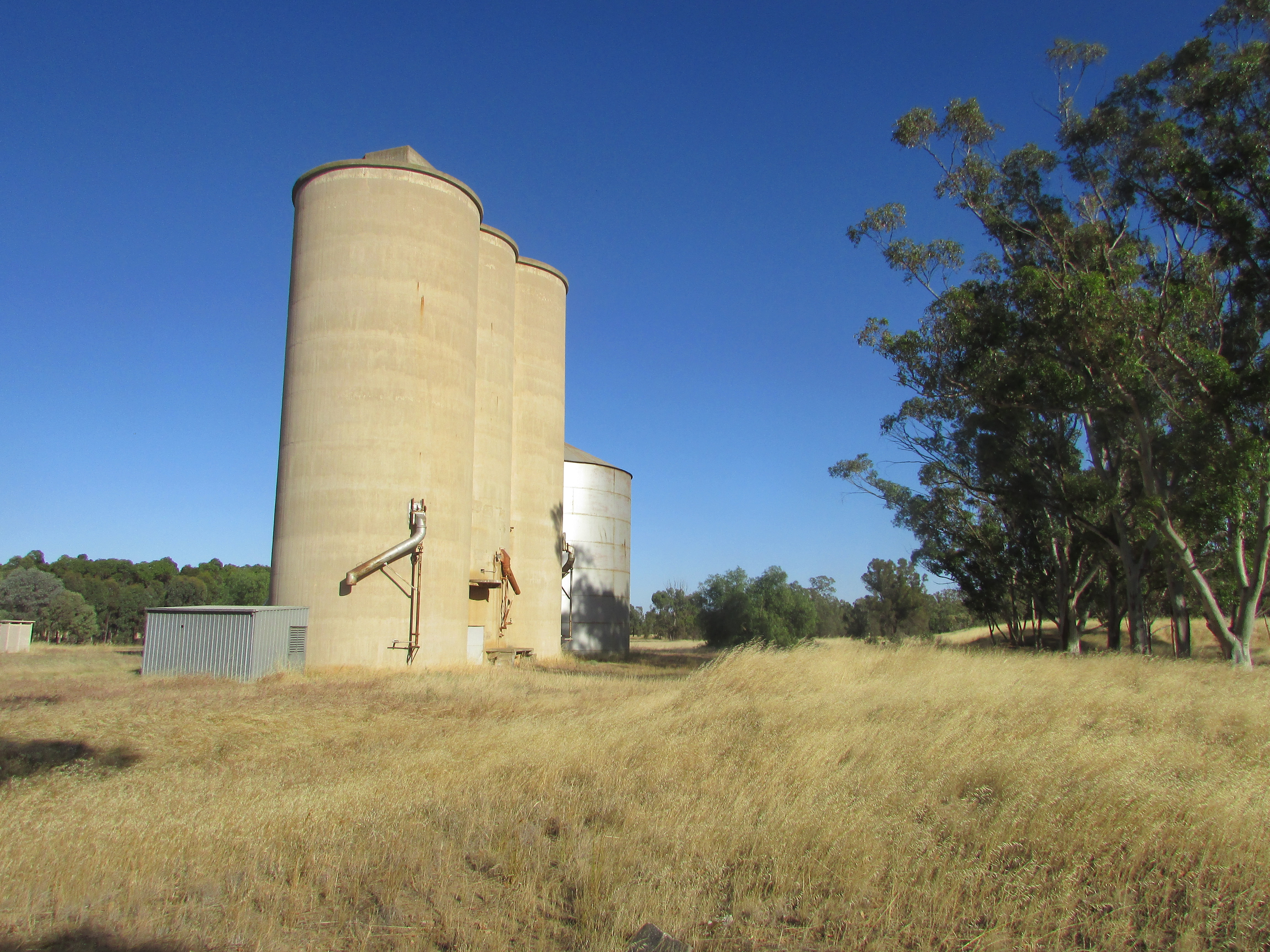
Silos at the site of Hunter Station, 2021

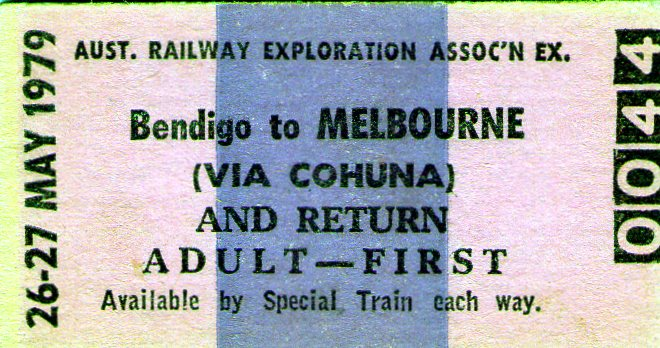
Bendigo via Cohuna enthusiasts' tour ticket, 1979

The Cohuna railway line is a closed line in the north of Victoria, Australia. Branching off the Bendigo-Deniliquin line at Elmore, it ran north-west to its terminus at Cohuna.

== History ==
The line was authorised by the 1912 Elmore to Cohuna Railway Construction Act, and was officially opened on 10 November 1915.

== Stations ==
All stations on the branch opened with the line on 10 November 1915. Stations on the section from Diggora West to Cohuna closed with that part of the line on 1 March 1981. The section from Elmore to Diggora West was closed on 8 December 1986.

- Elmore 128 miles (206 km) from Melbourne
- Hunter 135 miles (217 km)
- Diggora West 140 miles (230 km)
- McColl 144 miles (232 km)s
- Lockington 147 miles (237 km)
- Kotta 152 miles (245 km)
- Roslynmead 157 miles (253 km)
- Patho 165 miles (266 km)
- Gunbower 172 miles (277 km)
- Leitchville 177 miles (285 km)
- Keely 181 miles (291 km)
- Cohuna 185 miles (298 km)
