= Rochester railway station, Victoria =

Railway station in Victoria, Australia

Rochester
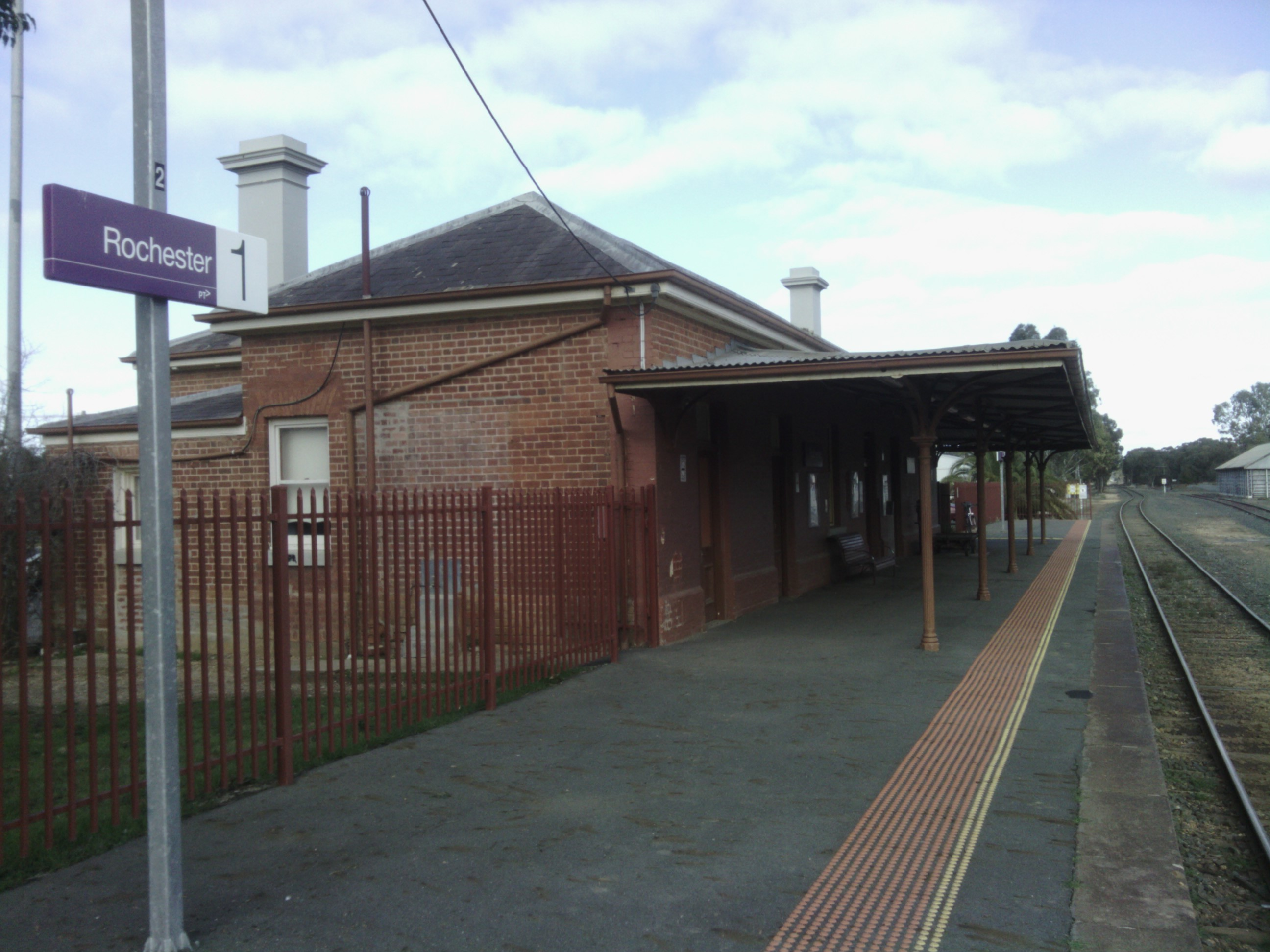
- Southbound view of the station building and platform, June 2015

General information
- Location: Northern Highway, Rochester, Victoria; Shire of Campaspe; Australia
- Coordinates: 36°21′43″S 144°41′55″E
- System: PTV regional rail station
- Owner: VicTrack
- Operator: V/Line
- Line: Echuca (Deniliquin)
- Distance: 223.45 kilometres from Southern Cross
- Platforms: 1
- Tracks: 2
- Connections: Coach

Construction
- Structure type: At-grade
- Accessible: Yes

Other information
- Status: Operational, unstaffed
- Station code: ROR
- Fare zone: Myki zone 15/16
- Website: Public Transport Victoria

History
- Opened: 19 September 1864; 162 years ago

Services
One in both directions on weekdays, two on weekends
Preceding station	V/Line	Following station
Elmore towards Southern Cross	Echuca line	Echuca Terminus
Location
- Location within Victoria

Rochester railway station is located on the Deniliquin line in Victoria, Australia. It serves the town of Rochester, and opened on 19 September 1864.

== Platforms and services ==
Rochester has one platform. It is served by V/Line Echuca line trains.

Rochester platform arrangement
Platform	Line	Destination
1	Echuca line	Southern Cross, Echuca

Rochester is also served by a V/Line road coach route running between Bendigo and Moama.
