= Better Farming Train (Saskatchewan) =

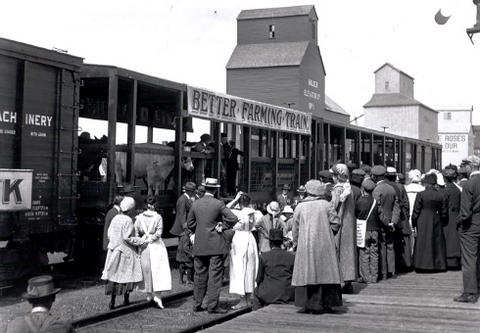
Livestock Car of the Better Farming Train in 1920.

The Better Farming Train was an agriculture demonstration train which toured Saskatchewan, Canada, between 1914 and 1922.

== Background ==
The idea of special trains to promote better agricultural practices was developed in Canada in the early years of the 20th century. In 1904, special trains brought farmers to the Dominion Experimental Farm in Indian Head to demonstrate farming techniques. In 1906, a Special Seed Train ran throughout the Canadian Prairies to advertise the Seed Act and warn of the dangers of weeds.

In 1913, the Government of Canada passed the Agricultural Instruction Act "to assist the provinces by grants of money to carry on educational and instructional work for the benefit and encouragement of agriculture". Two trains called "Better Farming Specials" operated in Manitoba in 1913, demonstrating farm equipment, live stock and home economics.

A more substantial "Better Farming Train" was devised by William Motherwell of the Saskatchewan Department of Agriculture. Motherwell was a firm believer in scientific agriculture and had the enthusiastic support of William Rutherford, a former Deputy Minister of Agriculture and then Dean of Agriculture at the newly formed University of Saskatchewan at Saskatoon. Rutherford offered the full assistance of the College of Agriculture to promote the latest information on agricultural research and how it could assist farmers. The train itself was provided at no cost by the Canadian Pacific Railway and operating expenses were borne by the grant.

== Formation ==
The train consisted of between 13 and 17 cars with exhibits and equipment for demonstrations and lectures. The train was divided into five sections: Livestock, Field Husbandry, Boys and Girls, Household Science, and Farm Mechanics. Each section had a lecture car and one or more demonstration cars. A flat car also carried displays and stock cars carried horses, cattle, sheep and pigs.

== Operation ==
The Better Farming Train operated in June and July every year from 1914 to 1922, targeting a different area of the province each year. Prominent professors from the college, including Grant MacEwan, and agricultural officials from the department served as demonstrators and lecturers. The train typically stopped in two communities each day.

== Summary ==
The table below is a summary of train operation.

Year	Distance travelled (miles)	Places visited	Attendance	Operating cost
1914	1,344	88	36,000	$7,000
1916	1,946	135	37,109	$6,742
1915	810	56	22,673	$4,787

== Other agricultural instruction cars ==
A separate Special Dairy Car, also known as the Travelling Dairy, ran in Saskatchewan in 1916 to promote better dairy farming practices. It was staffed by the Department and College and hauled by the Canadian Northern Railway. It was fitted out as a lecture coach with a stereopticon and exhibits.

Following the Better Farming Train, a single agriculture lecture car for the University of Saskatchewan was attached to various trains from 1923 until the early 1930s.

== Gallery ==
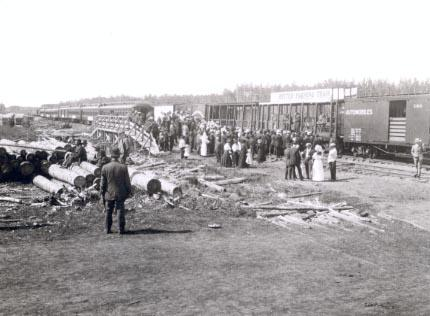
Better Farming Train in Debden, Saskatchewan c1914.

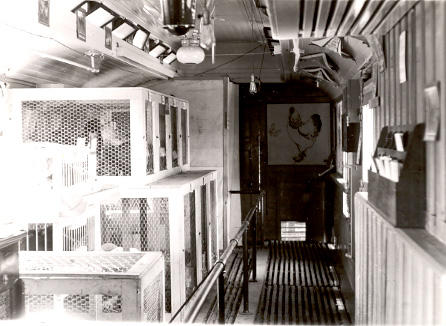
Poultry display on the Better Farming Train in 1920.

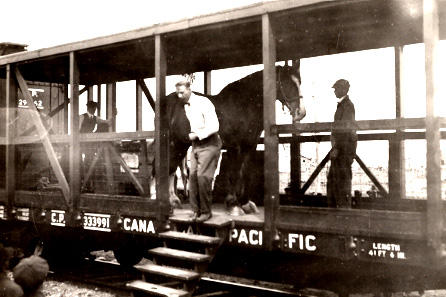
A Livestock Car of the Better Farming Train in 1920.

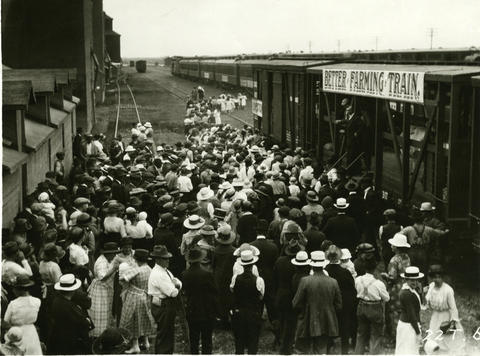
A lecture given from the Better Farming Train in 1922.

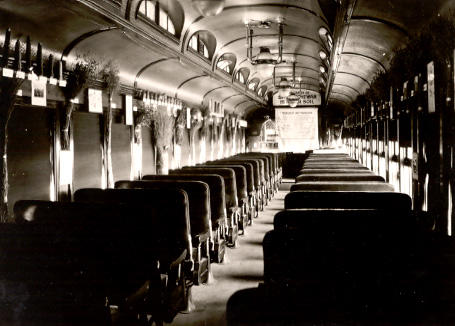
Interior of lecture car for teaching Crop Production.

== See also ==
- Better Farming Train (New South Wales), a similar train which operated in New South Wales, Australia between 1927 and 1929.
- Better Farming Train (Victoria), a similar train which operated in Victoria, Australia between 1924 and 1935.
