= Goornong =

- Suburb
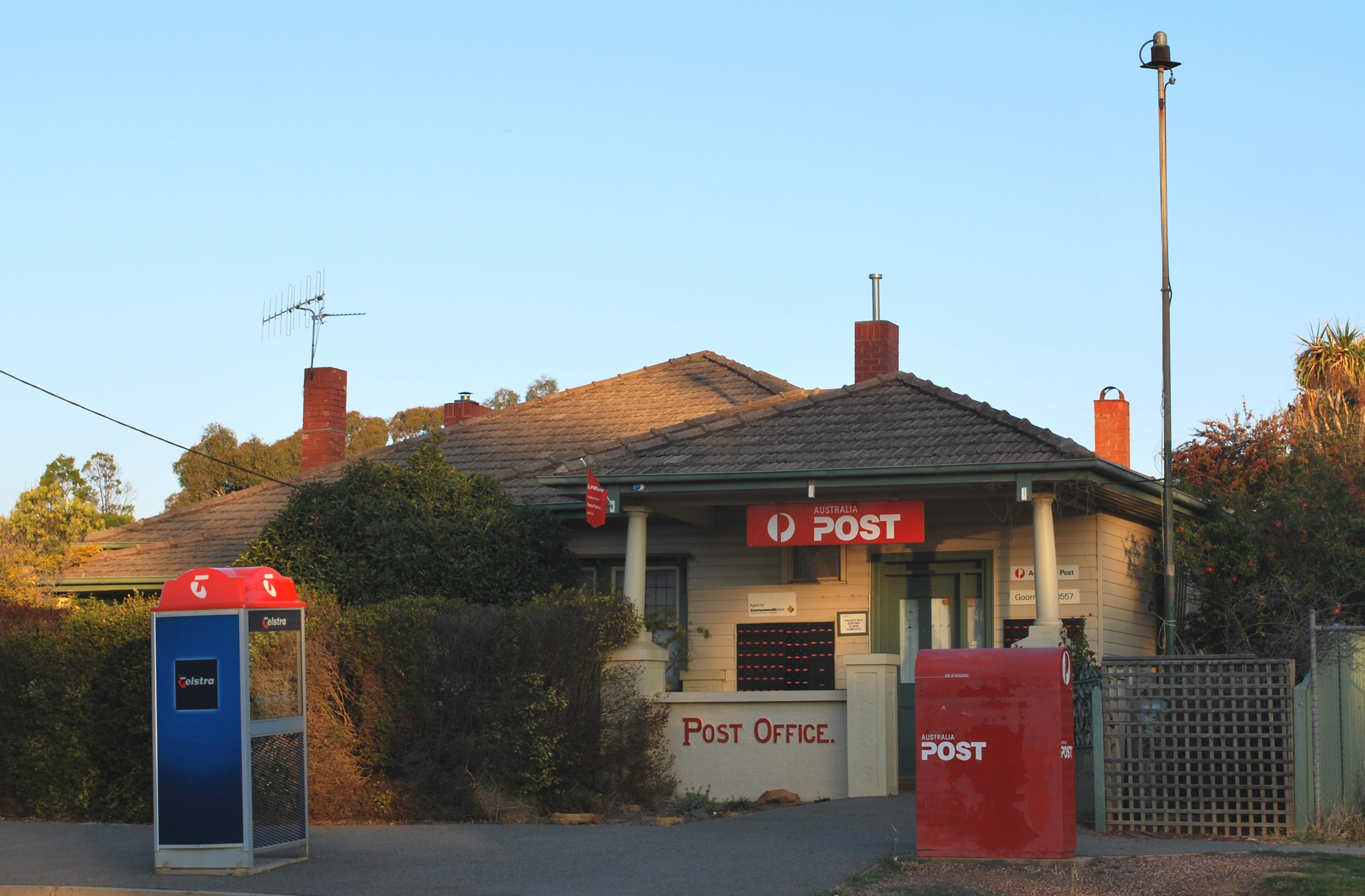
- Post office, 2009

- Interactive map of Goornong
- Coordinates: 36°36′52″S 144°30′26″E
- Country: Australia
- State: Victoria
- City: Bendigo
- LGA: City of Greater Bendigo
- Location: 161 km (100 mi) N of Melbourne; 27 km (17 mi) NE of Bendigo; 17 km (11 mi) SW of Elmore

Government
  - State electorate: Bendigo East
  - Federal division: Bendigo

Population
  - Total: 718 (2021 census)
- Postcode: 3557

Goornong is a town in north central Victoria, Australia. The town is in the City of Greater Bendigo local government area and on the Midland Highway, 159 kilometres (99 mi) north of the state capital, Melbourne.

At the 2021 census, Goornong had a population of 718.

A railway station opened in December 2021 as part of the Regional Rail Revival project, in order to serve the area.
