= Cohuna =

- Town
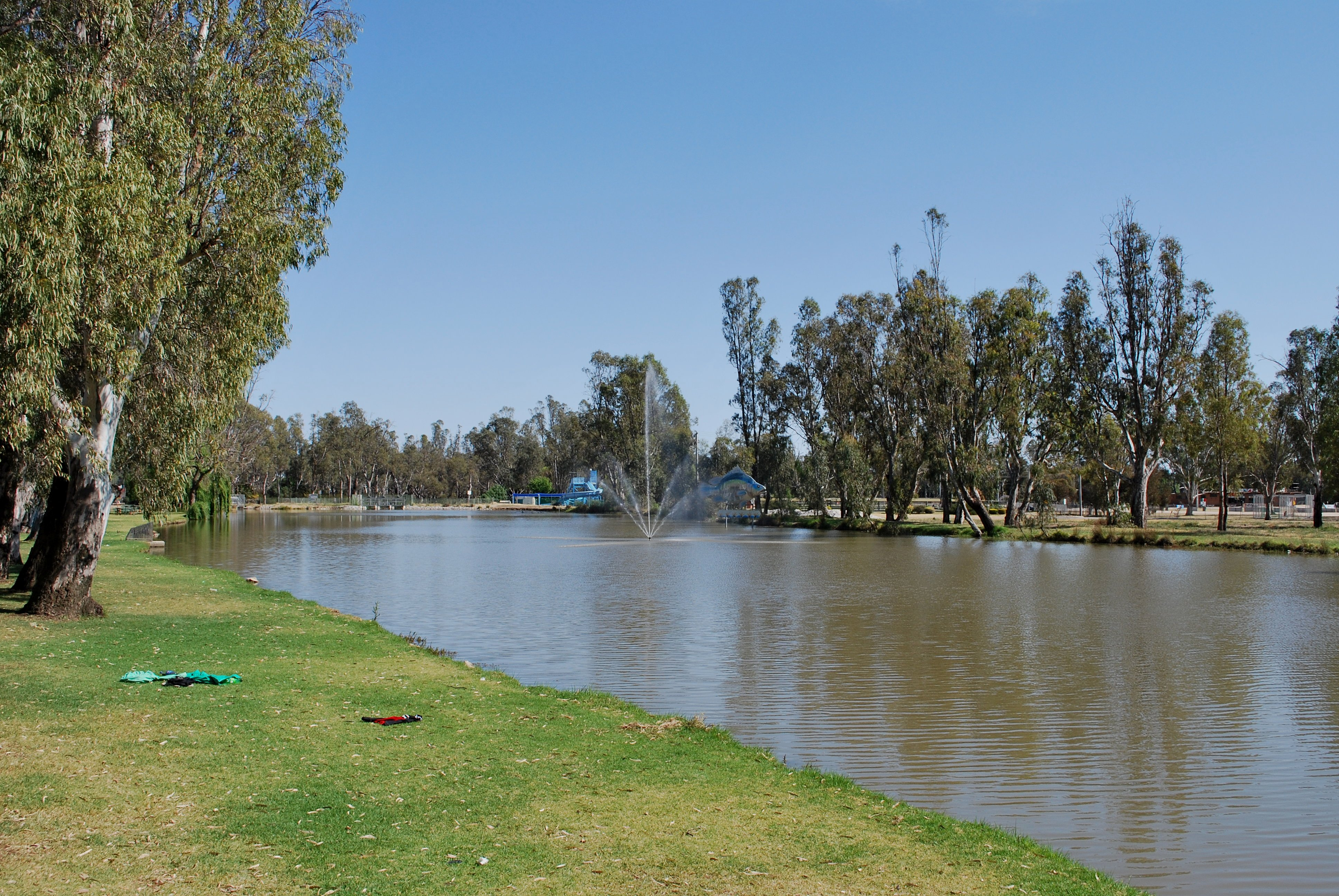
- Gunbower Creek

- Coordinates: 35°48′0″S 144°12′0″E
- Country: Australia
- State: Victoria
- LGA: Shire of Gannawarra
- Location: 274 km (170 mi) NW of Melbourne; 151 km (94 mi) N of Bendigo; 65 km (40 mi) NW of Echuca

Government
  - State electorate: Murray Plains
  - Federal division: Mallee

Population
  - Total: 2,415 (2016 census)
- Postcode: 3568

Cohuna /koʊˈhuːnə/ is a town situated 274 kilometres (170 mi) north of Melbourne, on the Murray Valley Highway, in northern Victoria, Australia. At the 2016 census, Cohuna had a population of 2,415.

== History ==
A post office opened in the area on 18 September 1875, known as Mologa until 1876, then Cohuna, and renamed Cullen in 1884 when Cohuna Township PO opened. This latter office was renamed Cohuna around 1887.

On 10 November 1915, Cohuna was connected to the Victorian Railways system when the 57-mile (92 km) branch line from Elmore to Cohuna was opened. The line was closed on 1 March 1981.

The Cohuna Magistrates' Court closed on 1 January 1990.

The Cohuna & District Historical Society has a museum that is open to visitors. The museum is in the old Scots Church building. The collection contains a variety of old household items and memorabilia from the district.

== The town today ==
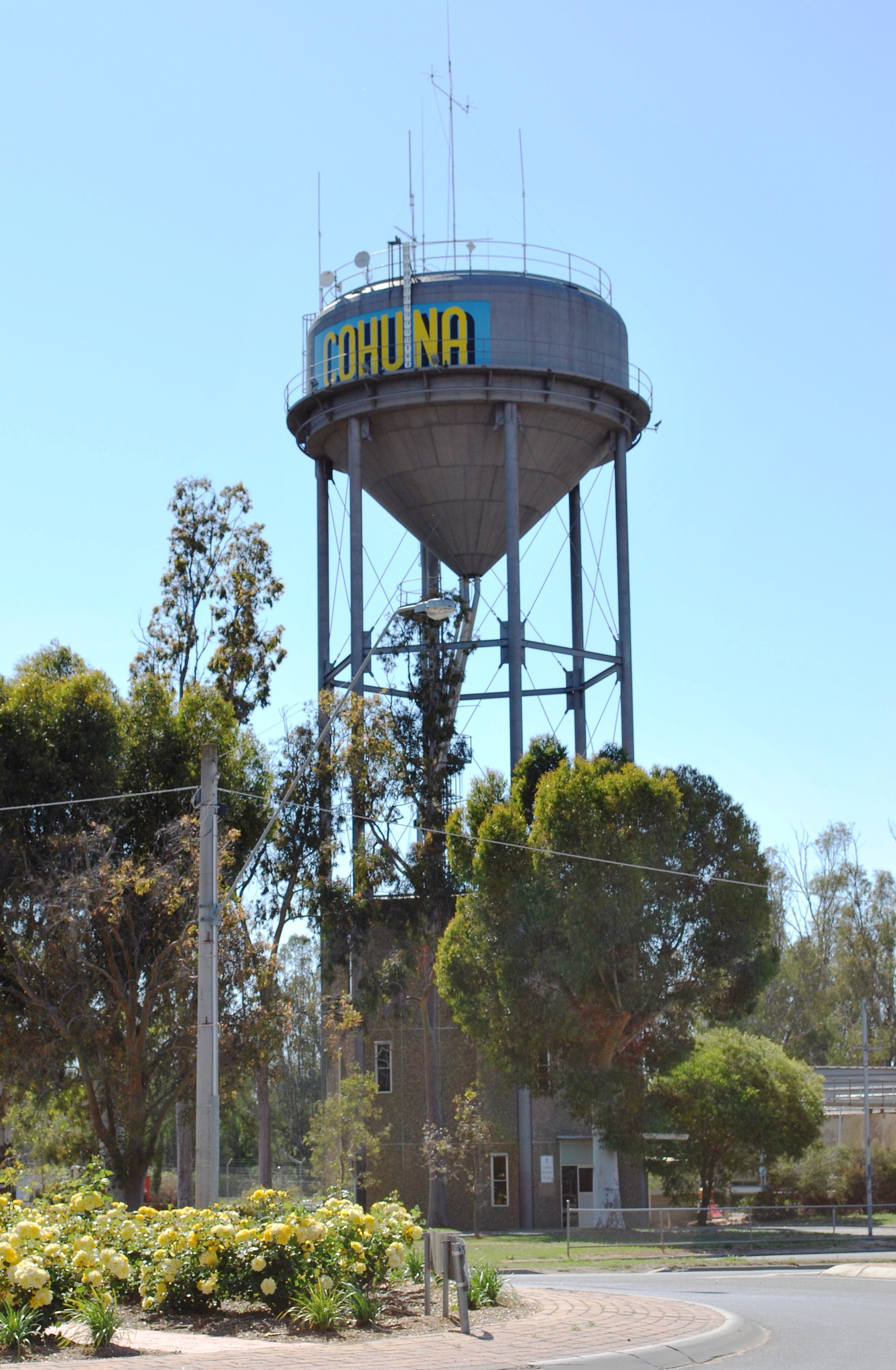
The Cohuna water tower

Surrounded by dairy farms and situated on the banks of Gunbower Creek, (an anabranch of the Murray River), the town is a popular holiday spot as well as a regional sports centre with a wide range of facilities.

Cohuna is the main access point to the attractions of the vast red gum and box forest covered Gunbower Island, which lies between Gunbower Creek and the Murray, and is home to diverse native birdlife, kangaroos and emus.

Legend has it that John Farnham was "discovered" in Cohuna, and he returned in 2002 for a free one-off show. The Bee Gees also played in Cohuna in their early days.

Australian artist Sarah Blasko used Cohuna landmarks such as a local cafe and hospital for her video "Planet New Year".

Gunbower Creek runs along the Main Street and Garden Park. Golf, tennis, parkrun, camping, fishing, water-skiing, canoeing, birdwatching and bushwalking are popular with visitors.

The Cohuna water tower is adorned with the town's name, and is visible for kilometres.

Cohuna took part in a regional “plastic bag free” initiative in the 2000s as part of environmental programs in northern Victoria.

== Events and sport ==
The Bridge to Bridge is an annual charity event that includes seven run and cycle events for all ages and abilities, and raises funds for the Cohuna District Hospital. The program of events includes a 21.1 km half marathon trail run, 12.5 km trail run, 6.5 km fun run/walk, Kids K 1 km junior run/walk, 25 km and 50 km cycle events and 6.5 km junior cycle event. The event is held on the first Sunday in March each year.

Cohuna hosts an Easter tennis tournament and golf tournament.

The local agricultural show is held in March and is organised by the Cohuna Agricultural, Pastoral & Horticultural Society. The first Cohuna Show was held in 1911.

The town has an Australian rules football team, the Cohuna Kangas, competing in the Central Murray Football League.

Golfers play at the Cohuna Golf Club on Weymouth Road.

== See also ==
- Cohuna railway line
