= Loch railway station =

Railway station in Victoria, Australia

Coordinates: 38°22′05″S 145°42′37″E

Loch
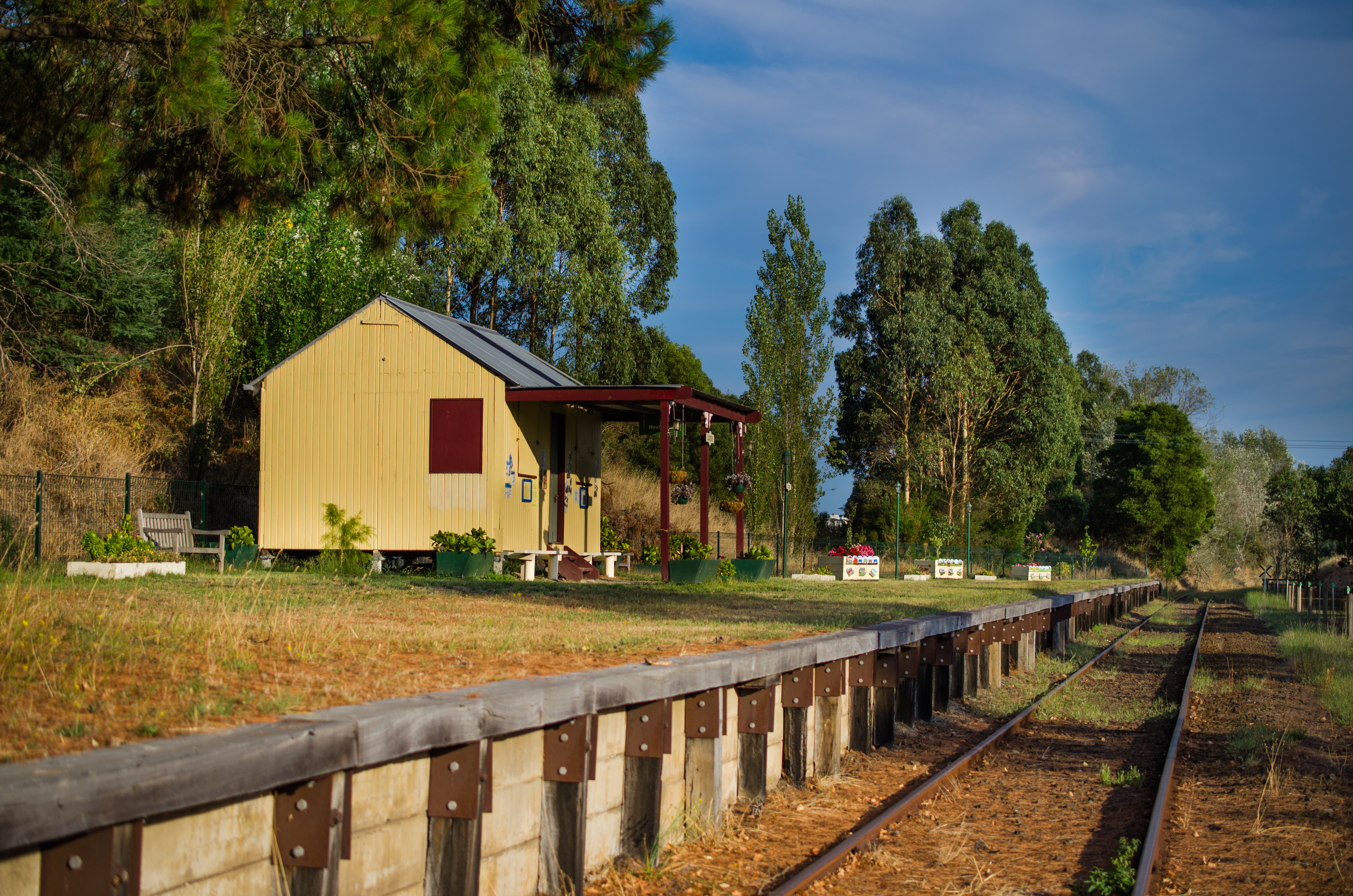
- Station platform and building, March 2013

General information
- Location: 100.41 km (62.39 mi) from Flinders Street
- System: South Gippsland Railway station
- Line: South Gippsland Railway
- Platforms: 1
- Tracks: 1, (3 until 1981), (2 until 1994, Loch Loop)

Other information
- Status: Closed 16 January 2016

History
- Opened: 11 November 1890; 135 years ago 1997; 29 years ago (reopened)
- Closed: 24 July 1993; 33 years ago

Services
Preceding station	VicRail	Following station
Nyora towards Spencer Street	South Gippsland line	Jeetho towards Yarram
Preceding station	V/Line	Following station
Nyora towards Spencer Street	South Gippsland line	Korumburra towards Leongatha
Location

Loch is a railway station on the former South Gippsland line in South Gippsland, Victoria, Australia, located in the town of Loch. The station was then part of the South Gippsland Tourist railway, after passenger operations on the line ceased after Cranbourne station in 1993, until 2016, when the railway shut down. It is located on the Great Southern Rail Trail.

The station is maintained by volunteers of the South Gippsland Railway, and by a growing number of people within the Loch township.

The station presently features a small station building that was formerly located at Welshpool station. It was relocated to the Loch platform in 2003 following the construction of the Loch bypass road. The former station structure when operating as a V/Line service was of the pebble coated concrete Bus Shelter type, on a grass platform, featuring a large tree on the southern end of the platform—typical of many small township railway stations. It is understood a more substantial building was at Loch, prior to its sidings and goods facilities being dismantled in the 1970s.

== Current status ==
Reopening the South Gippsland railway line as far as Leongatha is continuing to feature as a prominent issue for the region. A South Gippsland Shire Council Priority Projects documents released in June 2013 acknowledged that the return of rail as a major community priority where funding and support are sought from all forms of level government. In early 2014, a report into the extensions of the Melbourne metropolitan rail system identified the population growth corridor from Cranbourne to Koo-Wee-Rup along the disused Leongatha line as a key planning priority. The South and West Gippsland Transport Group, a public transportation and rail lobby group established in April 2011 that is closely associated with the South Gippsland Shire Council and local forms of government has continued to campaign for an integrated transport plan in the region, which includes rail at the forefront of the proposal. Previously, the group was classified as the South Gippsland Transport Users Group and had amalgamated with numerous rail lobby groups in 1994 shortly after the rail passenger service to Leongatha was withdrawn in July 1993 and the line to Barry Beach and Yarram was formally closed in June 1992 and dismantled by December 1994. One notable milestone that this group achieved in the past was running a successful campaign that saw passenger rail services reinstated to Leongatha on 9 December 1984. Despite the political promise to revive the railway line for freight and passenger services by the Steve Bracks led Victorian state Labor government in 1999 being abandoned in 2008 by his successor John Brumby, a public community campaign involving the South and West Gippsland Transport Group is continuing to lobby and work collaboratively with key stakeholders and governments to reinstate rail services that focuses on improving transport accessibility in the region.

Activities at Loch station include the monthly Lions Club Sunday Market. More community service groups are being encouraged to utilise the facility for events and activities.

== Gallery ==
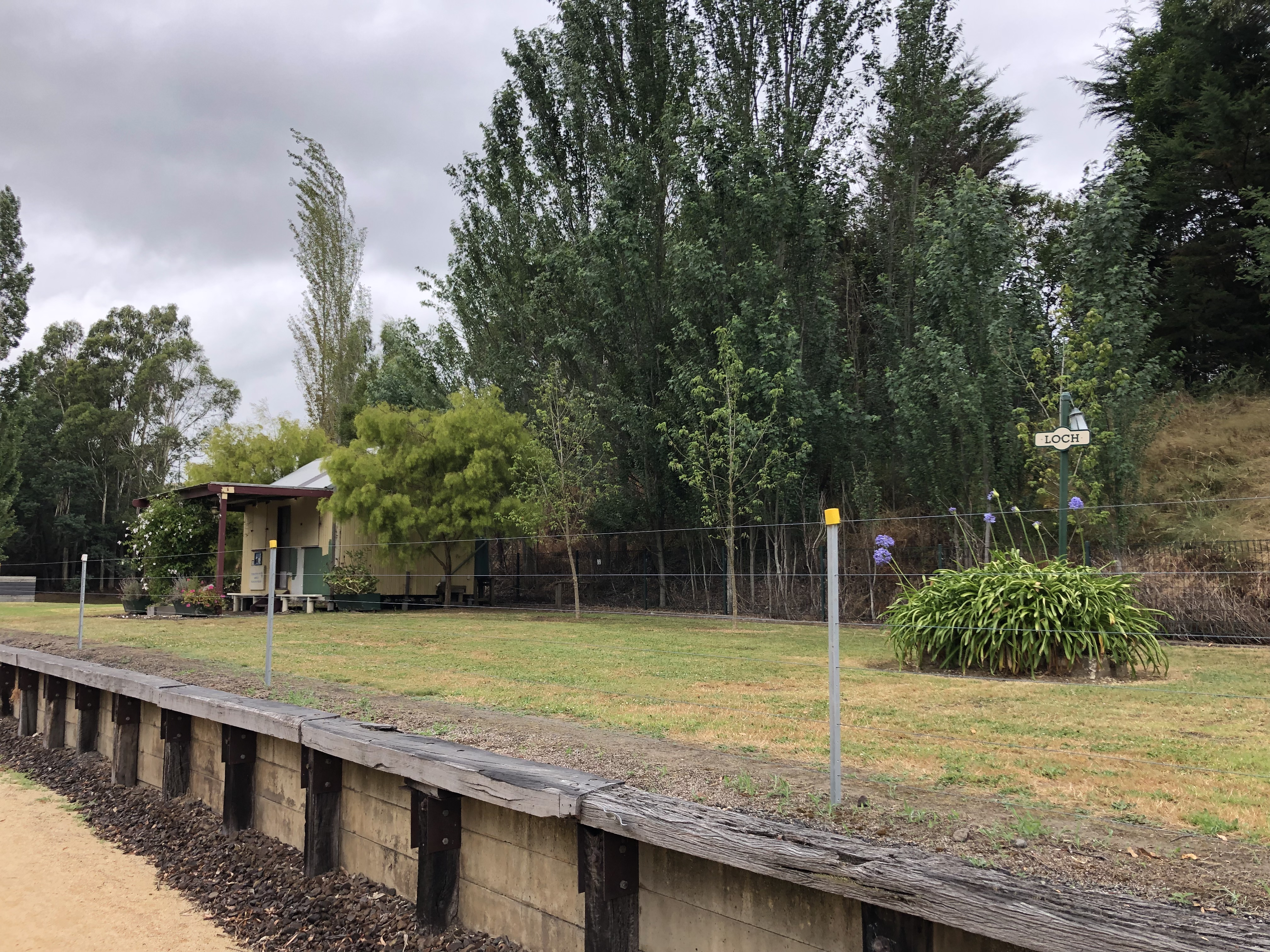
Loch Station Platform looking south

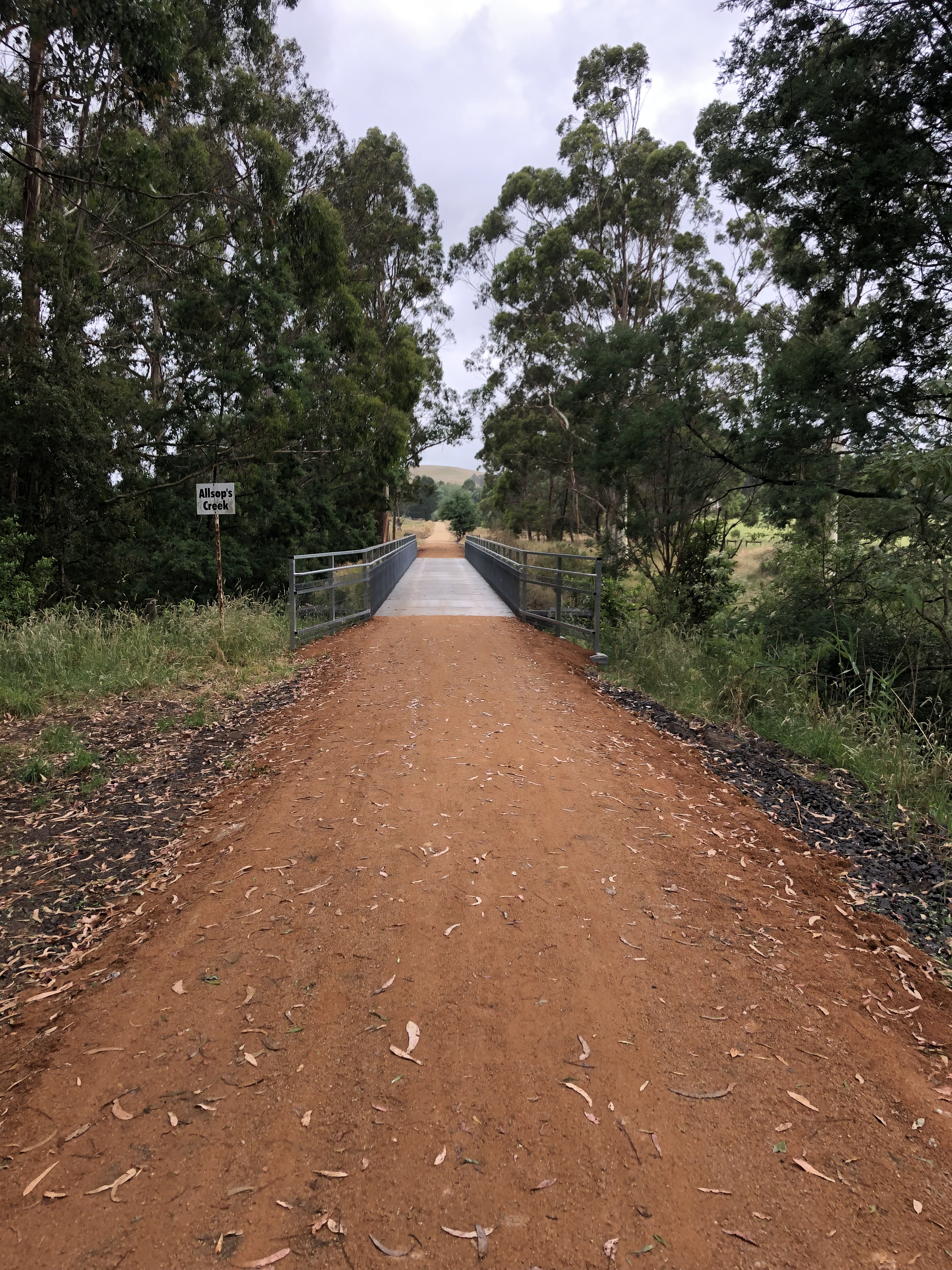
Allsops Creek Bridge

== Station layout ==
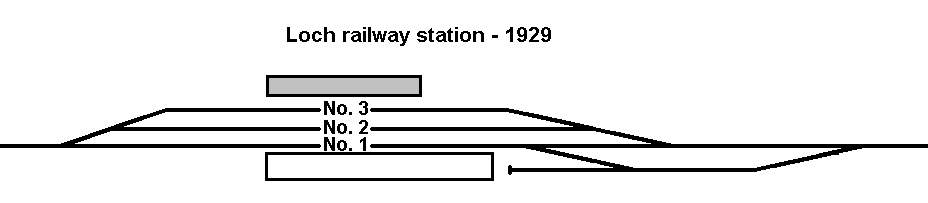
Station layout
