= Bennison railway station =

Former railway station in Victoria, Australia

Coordinates: 38°39′59″S 146°15′56″E

Bennison

General information
- Line: South Gippsland
- Platforms: 1
- Tracks: 1

Other information
- Status: Closed

History
- Opened: 1892; 134 years ago
- Closed: 1 August 1973; 53 years ago (Station); 1992; 34 years ago (Line)

Services
Preceding station	VicRail	Following station
Foster towards Spencer Street	South Gippsland line	Toora towards Yarram
Location

Bennison (originally Franklin River) was a railway station on the South Gippsland line, in South Gippsland, Victoria. The station was opened during the 1890s, and was closed to all traffic on 1 August 1973, at a time when many other stations and lines were closing around Victoria. The line was closed in 1991, at the same time as the line to Barry Beach, servicing the oil fields in Bass Strait, was closed. The line was then dismantled and turned into the Great Southern Rail Trail.
