= AGM Siding =

Former railway station in Victoria, Australia

Coordinates: 38°18′56″S 145°37′47″E

Australian Glass Manufacturers

General information
- Line: South Gippsland
- Tracks: 3

Other information
- Status: Closed

History
- Opened: 1960s
- Closed: 15 January 1998

Services
Preceding station	Disused railways	Following station
Lang Lang	South Gippsland line	Nyora
	List of closed railway stations in Victoria	
Location

Australian Glass Manufacturers Siding, which is also known as Koala Siding, was a railway siding on the South Gippsland railway line in South Gippsland, Victoria, Australia.

The siding was the last new siding on the line, being opened during the 1960s. It was the last source of traffic on the line after the withdrawal of the Leongatha passenger service on 24 July 1993. By the mid-1990s, only T, Y and P class diesel locomotives were used on the line due to their low axle loads, with a 15 km/h speed limit applying to parts of the track. This continued until 15 January 1998 when the sand train to the AGM glass works at Spotswood station ceased operation. The track between Nyora and Lang Lang was proposed for an extension for the South Gippsland Tourist Railway. However, the SGR ceased operations in 2015, and the line from Leongatha to Nyora has been dismantled as part of an extension of the Great Southern Rail Trail, and so this is unlikely to occur. Instead, it has been proposed to extend the trail back from Nyora to Cranbourne in the long term. For now, the track will remain disused and overgrown however.
