= Fish Creek railway station =

Former railway station in Victoria, Australia

Coordinates: 38°41′35″S 146°04′53″E

Fish Creek
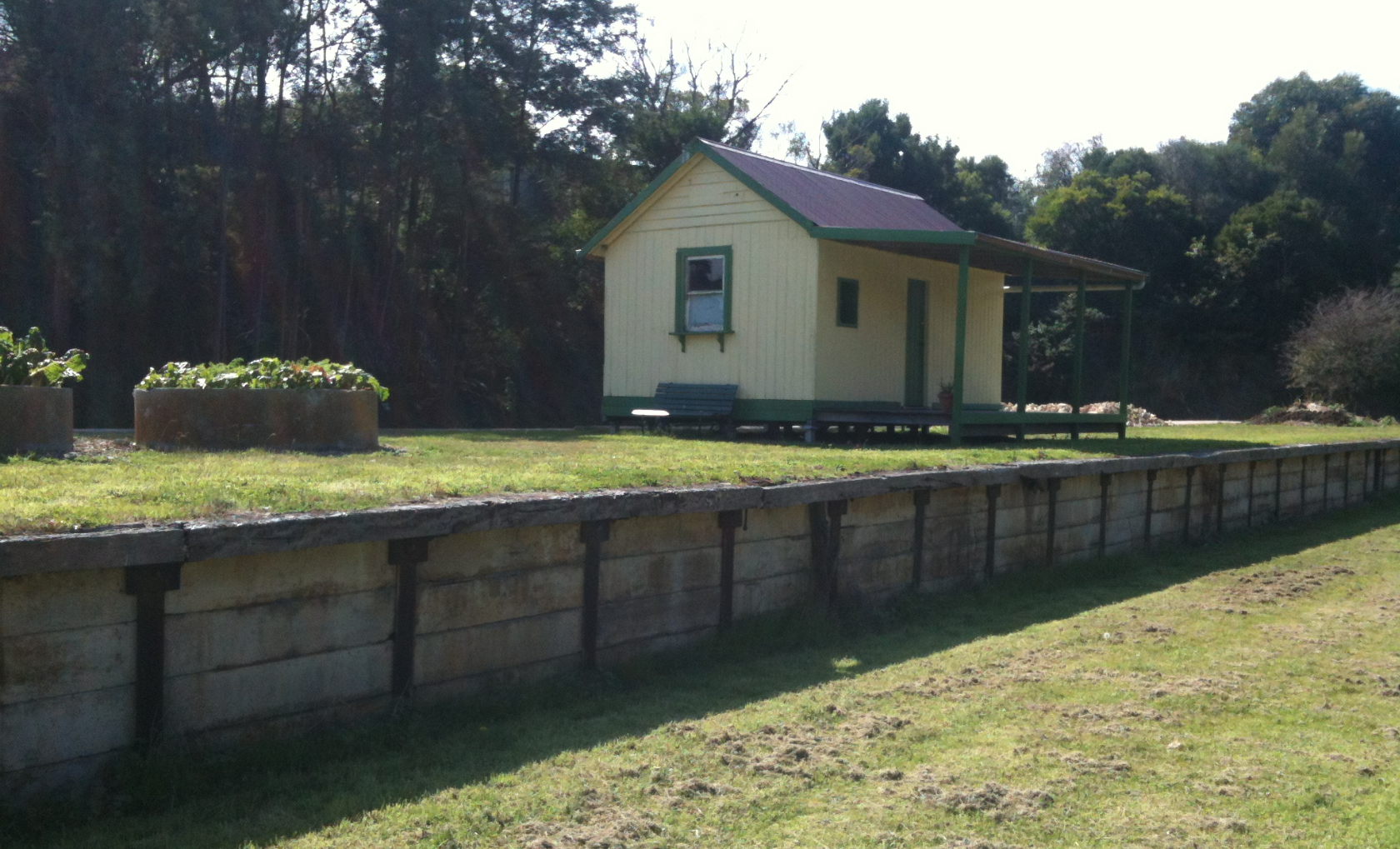
- Disused platform and building, April 2012

General information
- Line: South Gippsland
- Platforms: 1
- Tracks: 3

Other information
- Status: Closed

History
- Opened: 1892; 134 years ago
- Closed: 6 June 1981; 45 years ago (Station); 1992; 34 years ago (Line)

Services
Preceding station	VicRail	Following station
Boys towards Spencer Street	South Gippsland line	Hoddle towards Yarram
Location

Fish Creek was a railway station on the South Gippsland railway line in South Gippsland, Victoria. The station was opened during the 1890s and operated until 1992 when the line to Barry Beach servicing the oil fields in Bass Strait was closed. The line was then dismantled and turned into the Great Southern Rail Trail. Fish Creek contained a rather extensive goods yard, all of which now has been demolished. The remaining platform is still in good condition.
