= Toora railway station =

Former railway station in Victoria, Australia

Coordinates: 38°40′00″S 146°19′35″E

Toora

General information
- Line: South Gippsland
- Platforms: 1
- Tracks: 3

Other information
- Status: Closed

History
- Opened: 1892; 134 years ago
- Closed: 6 June 1981; 45 years ago (Station); 1992; 34 years ago (Line)

Services
Preceding station	VicRail	Following station
Bennison towards Spencer Street	South Gippsland line	Agnes towards Yarram
Location

Toora was a railway station on the South Gippsland railway line in South Gippsland, Victoria. The station was opened in the 1890s and operated until the line was closed in 1991, at the same time the line to Barry Beach servicing the oil fields in Bass Strait was closed. The line was dismantled and turned into the Great Southern Rail Trail.

== See also ==
- Toora
