= Welshpool railway station (disambiguation) =

Welshpool railway station is a station in Welshpool Powys, Wales

Welshpool station may also refer to:

- Welshpool Raven Square railway station, on the Welshpool and Llanfair Light Railway in Powys, Wales, UK
- Welshpool railway station, Perth, a former railway station in Western Australia
- Welshpool railway station, Victoria, a former railway station in Victoria, Australia
