= Gelliondale railway station =

Former railway station in Victoria, Australia

Coordinates: 38°37′14″S 146°36′21″E

Gelliondale

General information
- Line: South Gippsland
- Platforms: 1
- Tracks: 1

Other information
- Status: Closed

History
- Opened: 1892; 134 years ago
- Closed: 6 June 1981; 45 years ago (Station); 1987; 39 years ago (Line)

Services
Preceding station	VicRail	Following station
Hedley towards Spencer Street	South Gippsland line	Alberton towards Yarram
Location

Gelliondale was a railway station on the South Gippsland railway line in South Gippsland, Victoria. The station was opened during the 1890s and operated until the 1970s.
