= Korumburra railway station =

Railway station in Victoria, Australia

Coordinates: 38°25′50″S 145°49′02″E

Korumburra
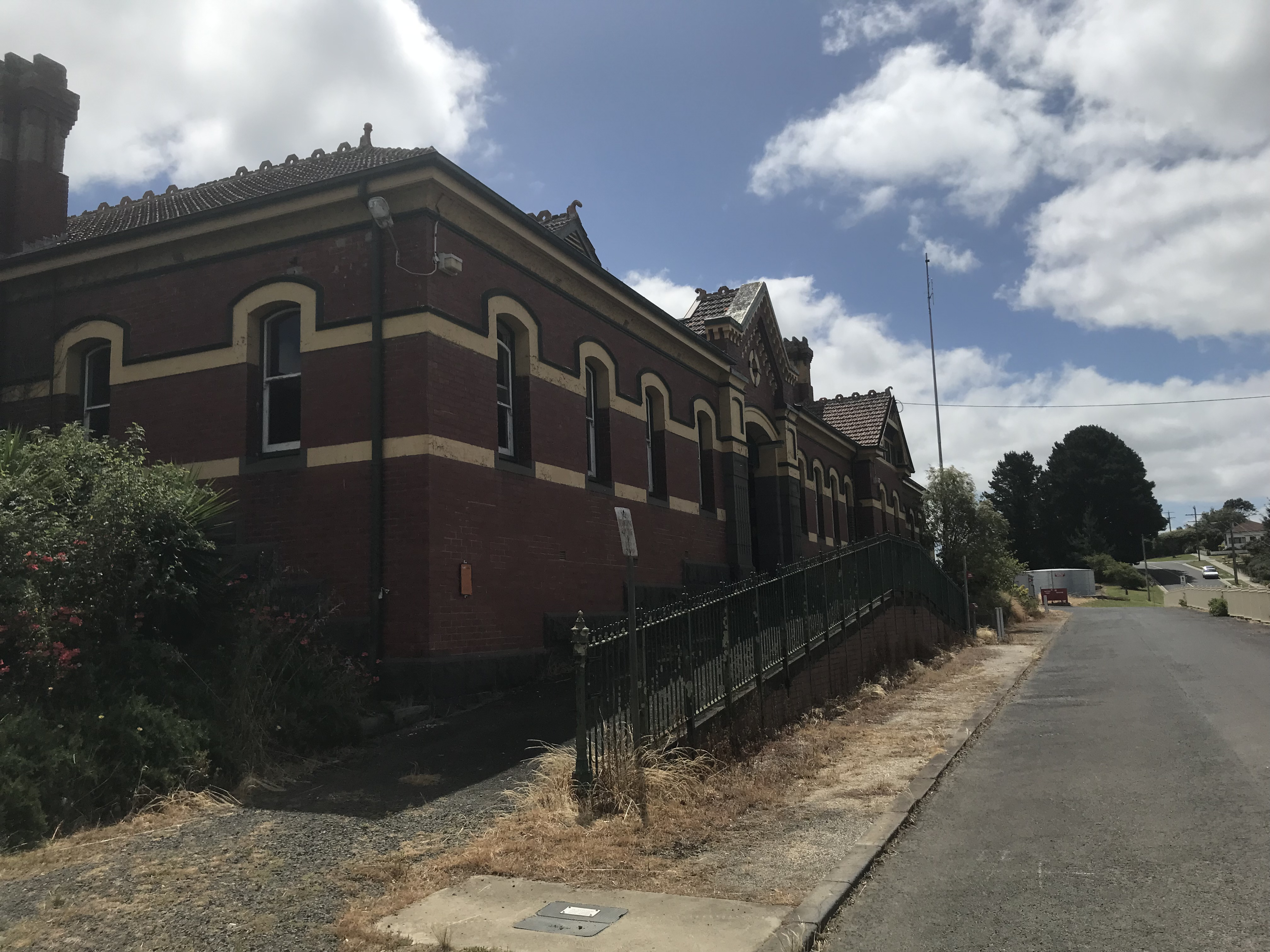
- Station building and entrance in December 2021

General information
- Location: 116 km (72 mi) from Flinders Street
- System: South Gippsland Railway station
- Line: South Gippsland Railway
- Platforms: 1
- Tracks: 6

Other information
- Status: Former Heritage and tourist station

History
- Opened: 2 June 1891; 135 years ago 1994; 32 years ago (re-opened)
- Closed: 24 July 1993; 33 years ago 2016; 10 years ago (SGR Closed)

Services
Preceding station	VicRail	Following station
Whitelaw towards Spencer Street	South Gippsland line	Kardella towards Yarram
Whitelaw towards Spencer Street	Outtrim line	Jumbunna towards Outtrim
Preceding station	V/Line	Following station
Loch towards Spencer Street	South Gippsland line	Leongatha Terminus
Location

Korumburra is a heritage listed railway station on the former South Gippsland line in South Gippsland, Victoria, Australia. Passenger operations on the line ceased beyond Cranbourne station in July 1993. The station was part of the South Gippsland tourist railway between 1994 and 2015 but is no longer in use.

== Current status ==
Between 1999 and 2008, there was constant speculation that the railway line beyond Cranbourne to Leongatha could re-open, as promised by the Victorian State Government, under a project named "Bringing Trains Back to Victorians". In May 2008, a scoping study carried out on behalf of the State Government found the costs of returning services high, at $72 million. Therefore, plans to reopen the line were stopped, and the Government has pledged to spend $14.2 million on improved V/Line coach services in the South Gippsland region instead. Further, there are plans in motion to turn the railway reservation into a Rail Trail between Cranbourne East and Nyora.

Reopening the South Gippsland railway line as far as Leongatha is continuing to feature as a prominent issue for the region. A South Gippsland Shire Council Priority Projects documents released in June 2013 acknowledged that the return of rail as a major community priority where funding and support are sought from all forms of level government. In early 2014, a report into the extensions of the Melbourne metropolitan rail system identified the population growth corridor from Cranbourne to Koo-Wee-Rup along the disused Leongatha line as a key planning priority. The South and West Gippsland Transport Group, a public transportation and rail lobby group established in April 2011 that is closely associated with the South Gippsland Shire Council and local forms of government has continued to campaign for an integrated transport plan in the region, which includes rail at the forefront of the proposal. Previously, the group was classified as the South Gippsland Transport Users Group and had amalgamated with numerous rail lobby groups in 1994 shortly after the rail passenger service to Leongatha was withdrawn in July 1993 and the line to Barry Beach and Yarram was formally closed in June 1992 and dismantled by December 1994. One notable milestone that this group achieved in the past was running a successful campaign that saw passenger rail services reinstated to Leongatha on 9 December 1984. Despite the political promise to revive the railway line for freight and passenger services by the Steve Bracks led Victorian state Labor government in 1999 being abandoned in 2008 by his successor John Brumby, a public community campaign involving the South and West Gippsland Transport Group is continuing to lobby and work collaboratively with key stakeholders and governments to reinstate rail services that focuses on improving transport accessibility in the region.

Rail trail passing the newly renovated station building

== Location ==
Korumburra Railway Station is located on Station Street, off Bridge Street, Korumburra. Bridge street can be accessed from the South Gippsland Highway Bridge Street is named after the road overpass bridge that crosses the railway line, dividing the eastern and western halves of the town.

The station contains a well preserved red brick station, large goods yard, a fully working turntable and goods shed. The station building currently enjoys a heritage listing, and the station's 100th birthday was in January 2008.

Korumburra Railway Station features a Railway Museum, featuring railway artifacts and items from the entire South Gippsland Line. Various items have been donated from people throughout the district. An additional ongoing display is a photographic exhibition featuring images of railway infrastructure, vehicles and railway workers in action from Koo-Wee-Rup through to Foster and beyond—all prior to the 1994 closure of the line.

As well as the many freight trains that ran on the line superphosphate special trains were commonly stabled at the Korumburra Yards. Superphosphate trains would run around Winter months and transported many goods products, farming produce, fertilizer, oil, explosives, super, grain, cement and many more products.

== Public transport services ==
Upon the closure of the railway stations for regular passenger traffic, the V/Line coach stop was located outside the Korumburra station in Station Street.

Changes to services and streamlining of coach services meant the change of V/Line coach stops along the route, with Korumburra's coach stop being moved from the Korumburra Station to the main street. A second bus-stop is now located outside the Coal Creek Community Park and Museum on the corner of Silkstone Road and the South Gippsland Highway.

== Station layout ==
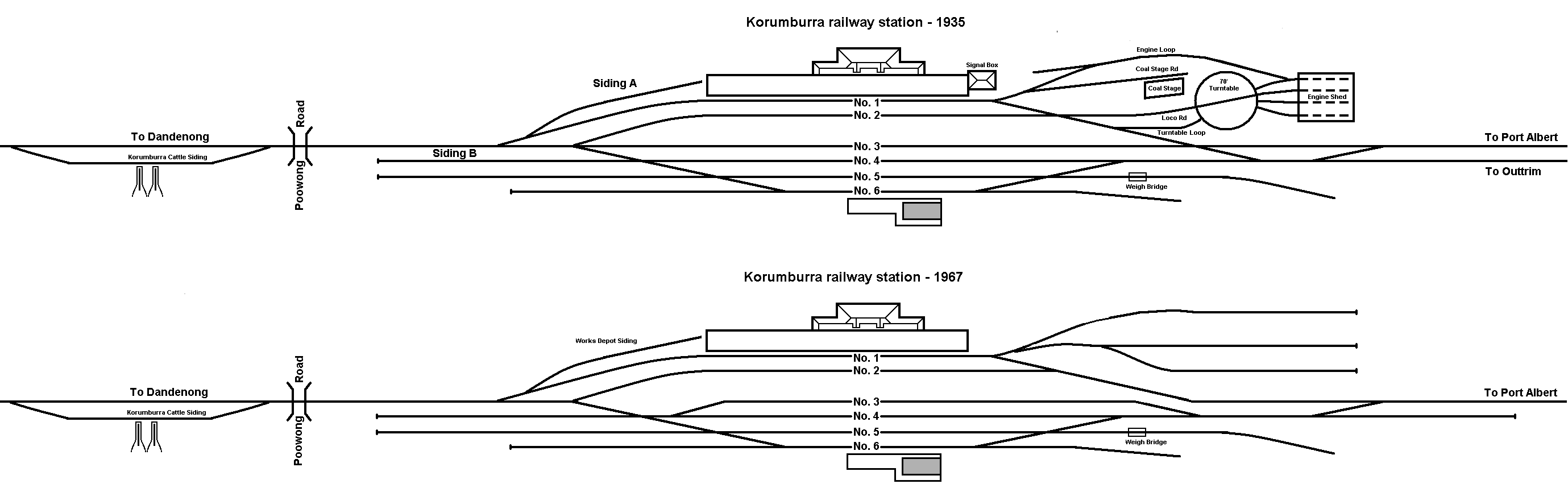
