= Hoddle railway station =

Former railway station in Victoria, Australia

Coordinates: 38°41′23″S 146°8′9″E

Hoddle

General information
- Line: South Gippsland
- Platforms: 1
- Tracks: 1

Other information
- Status: Closed

History
- Opened: 1892; 134 years ago
- Closed: c.1965; 61 years ago 1992; 34 years ago (Line)

Services
Preceding station	VicRail	Following station
Fish Creek towards Spencer Street	South Gippsland line	Foster towards Yarram
Location

Hoddle (originally Hoddle Range) was a railway station on the South Gippsland railway line in South Gippsland, Victoria. The station was opened during the 1890s and was one of the first to close on the South Gippsland line, closing in the 1960s.
