= Hedley railway station =

Railway station in Victoria

Coordinates: 38°38′37″S 146°30′20″E

Hedley

General information
- Line: South Gippsland
- Platforms: 1
- Tracks: 1

Other information
- Status: Closed

History
- Opened: 1892; 134 years ago
- Closed: 31 August 1976; 49 years ago (Station); 1987; 39 years ago (Line)

Services
Preceding station	VicRail	Following station
Welshpool towards Spencer Street	South Gippsland line	Gelliondale towards Yarram
Location

Hedley was a railway station on the South Gippsland line in South Gippsland, Victoria. The station was opened during the 1890s, and operated until its closure on 31 July 1976.
