= Agnes railway station =

Former railway station in Victoria, Australia

Coordinates: 38.672494°S 146.392608°E

Agnes/Barry Beach Junction

General information
- Line: South Gippsland
- Platforms: 1
- Tracks: 2

Other information
- Status: Closed

History
- Opened: 1892; 134 years ago
- Closed: 6 June 1981; 45 years ago (Station); 1992; 34 years ago (Line)

Services
Preceding station	VicRail	Following station
Toora towards Spencer Street	South Gippsland line	Welshpool towards Yarram
Location

Agnes (originally Agnes River) was a railway station on the South Gippsland railway line in South Gippsland, Victoria.

The station was opened in 1892 and operated as Agnes River until 1 January 1906, when it was renamed to simply Agnes. It was then renamed Barry Beach Junction, after the opening of the line to Barry Beach servicing the oil fields in Bass Strait, before closing in 1981.
