= Derm, Namibia =

Derm
- Location within Namibia
- Coordinates: 23°38′37″S 018°6′52″E
- Country: Namibia
- Time zone: UTC+2 (South African Standard Time)

Derm is a hamlet in the Hardap Region of central Namibia, on Route M-41 at its intersection with routes D-1328 and C-25. It is 13 kilometres (8 mi) east of the Lüneburg farmstead.

There is a police station there and a landing strip south-southeast of the hamlet.

Derm is situated 132 kilometres (82 mi) north-east of Mariental and 24 km east of Uhlenhorst in the Rehoboth district. Afrikaans for 'intestine', the name is translated from Khoekhoen Guias.

The town was named after the Victorian Railways Diesel Electric Railmotor after its successful introduction to Victoria's railway network.
