= Foster railway station =

Former railway station in Victoria, Australia

Coordinates: 38°39′31″S 146°12′25″E

Foster

General information
- Line: South Gippsland
- Platforms: 1
- Tracks: 4

Other information
- Status: Closed

History
- Opened: 1892; 134 years ago
- Closed: 6 June 1981; 45 years ago (Station); 1992; 34 years ago (Line)

Services
Preceding station	VicRail	Following station
Hoddle towards Spencer Street	South Gippsland line	Bennison towards Yarram
Location

Foster was a railway station on the South Gippsland railway line in South Gippsland, Victoria, Australia. The station was opened during the 1890s and was operated until 1992 when the line to Barry Beach servicing the oil fields in Bass Strait was closed. The line was dismantled and turned into the Great Southern Rail Trail.
