= Tom Purvis (footballer) =

Australian rules footballer

Personal information
- Full name: Thomas Raby Purvis
- Born: 5 May 1916; Northcote, Victoria
- Died: 5 March 2008 (aged 91); Toora, Victoria
- Height: 180 cm (5 ft 11 in)
- Weight: 70 kg (154 lb)

Playing career^{1}
Years	Club	Games (Goals)
1938	South Melbourne	3 (0)
- ^{1} Playing statistics correct to the end of 1938.

Thomas Raby Purvis (5 May 1916 – 5 March 2008) was an Australian rules footballer who played with South Melbourne in the Victorian Football League (VFL).
