= Toora =

- Town
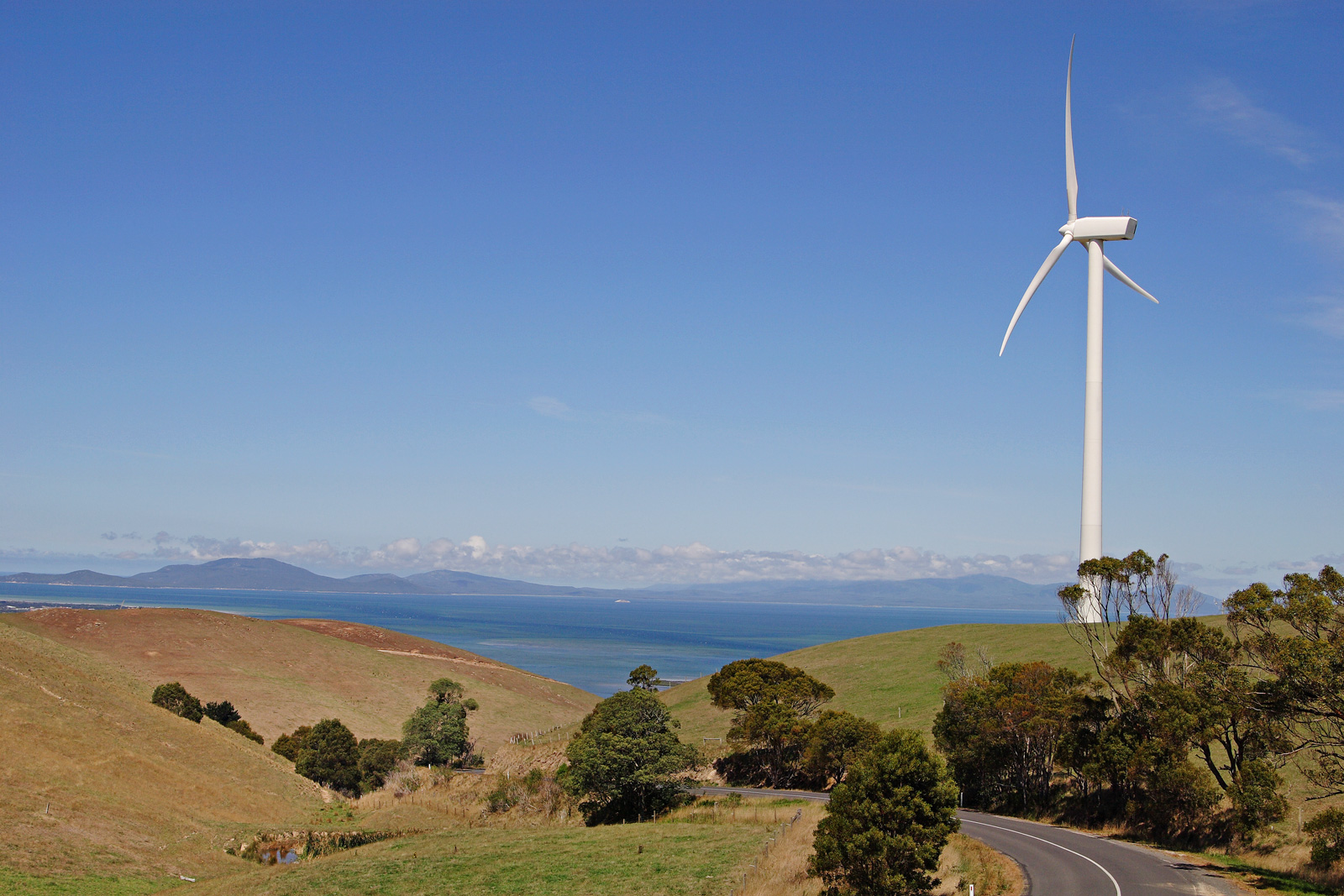
- Wind Turbine

- Coordinates: 38°39′S 146°20′E
- Country: Australia
- State: Victoria
- LGA: South Gippsland Shire

Government
  - State electorate: Gippsland South
  - Federal division: Monash

Population
  - Total: 681 (2016 census)
- Postcode: 3962
- County: Buln Buln

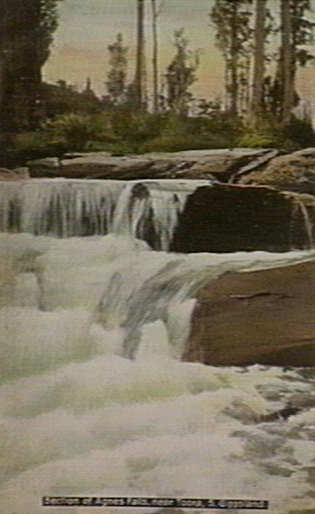
Agnes Falls, near Toora

Toora is a town in Victoria, Australia whose main industry is dairy farming. It is located at the top of Corner Inlet opposite Wilsons Promontory National Park. In the 2016 census the population was 681.

== History ==
The Post Office opened on 18 August 1882.

Located on the South Gippsland Highway east of Wilsons Promontory, Toora was first named Muddy Creek in the 1860s when a timber mill was set up on a 640-acre Mangrove Pre-emptive Right to supply much needed hardwood for the colony. The gold boom had led to a building surge in Melbourne when blue gum sleepers were used in the first piers constructed at Port Melbourne while railway sleepers were sent to India when the British Government were constructing hundreds of miles of railway lines.

George Buchanan built a sawmill at Sealers Cove on Wilsons Promontory but the supply of timber was too limited and in 1853 he arranged for it to be relocated first to Agnes River and then across to Muddy Creek. Situated on the east bank of Muddy Creek, Buchanan's Mill had contracts for many types of sawn timber which was transported across the mangrove swamp to Swan Bay where it was loaded onto barges which carried them to larger boats anchored in deeper water in Corner Inlet. Parts of the old tramlines and loading facilities still remain.

More mills were established in the thickly forested hills and the timber was transported on tramlines across swamps and taken to seaports by barges.

Not far from the old mill site, still on the coastal plain, during the depression of the 1890s the government of the day encouraged settlement of the area as farming land under the Village Settlement Scheme but the blocks were too small and the scheme failed. The abandoned land was taken up for dairying and the fattening of cattle. These are the main industries of the area today.

The Toora Magistrates' Court closed on 1 July 1981, not having been visited by a Magistrate since 1971.

== Surrounding area ==
North of Toora beyond Mt. Best and Mt. Fatigue is the Gunyah Gunyah Forest which is home to huge mountain ash, beaches, wattles and tree ferns. This timber reserve of 2,000 acres backs onto the Grand Ridge Road which meanders across the full length of the Strzelecki Ranges.

Nearby Agnes Falls are the tallest in Victoria and easily accessible to the thousands of visitors who each year come to the Strzelecki Ranges and Wilsons Promontory.

A round trip along the scenic route from Toora leads to the sea via Welshpool to Port Welshpool where the Long Jetty has been added to the Heritage List.

The district is rich in maritime history with small fishing fleets operating from Port Welshpool, Port Franklin and Port Albert while cray boats work from Walkerville.

A boat ramp at Toora gives access to Corner Inlet and is a short drive from Port Franklin, Yarram, Waratah Bay and many ports off the South Gippsland Highway.

Turtons Creek north of nearby Foster, once rich in alluvial gold, is now a naturalist's paradise of tree fern gullies and lyrebirds.

== The town today ==
It has recently become known for the Toora Wind Farm, consisting of 12 large wind-powered turbines above the town. The Great Southern Rail Trail bike trail also passes through Toora from Leongatha.

The town has an Australian Rules football team (Toora and District) competing in the Alberton Football League.

Toora Football Club won the 1906 and 1911 South Gippsland Football Association premierships.

Toora has a number of local facilities including a caravan park and heated swimming pool.

Viplus Dairy Has been in Toora since 2015 and prior to Covid had over 150 local residents as Employees.

The Royal Standard Hotel served as Toora's main pub since 1889 before closing in February 2025, when it entered liquidation. This was due to a combination of financial difficulties and storm damages. A storm in September 2024 damaged the building exterior and balcony. In mid-2025, an inspection of the building by the local council deemed it unsafe to reopen. As of January 2026, the pub remains closed.

== See also ==
- Toora railway station
