= Welshpool Jetty railway line =

Former railway line in Victoria, Australia

Coordinates: 38°42′4″S 146°27′59″E

Welshpool Jetty
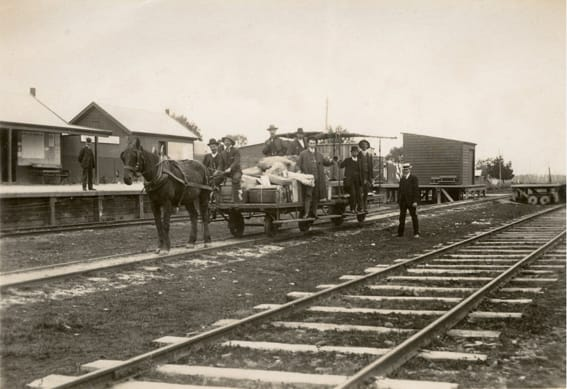
- Horse-drawn tramway at Welshpool railway station

Overview
- Status: Dismantled line
- Owner: Victorian Railways (VR) (1905–1941)
- Locale: Victoria, Australia
- Termini: Welshpool; Welshpool Jetty
- Former connections: Port Albert line
- Stations: 2 former stations; 1 former siding

Service
- Type: Former Victorian narrow gauge horse drawn tramway
- Operator(s): Victorian Railways (VR) (1905–1941)
- Rolling stock: Horse drawn wagons

History
- Commenced: 26 June 1905
- Opened: 26 June 1905
- Completed: 26 June 1905
- Closed: 1 January 1941

Technical
- Line length: ~5.2 km (3.23 mi)
- Number of tracks: Single track
- Track gauge: 2 ft 6 in (762 mm)

The Welshpool Jetty railway was a 2 ft 6 in (762 mm) narrow gauge branch line in Victoria, Australia. It opened on 26 June 1905, and was operated as a horse-drawn tramway, connecting Welshpool station to Port Welshpool. It had a total length of just under 3.1 miles (5 km) and ran to the old fishing jetty. The line closed on 1 January 1941.

== Station histories ==
Station	Opened	Closed	Age	Notes
Welshpool	13 January 1892 || 5 June 1990 || data-sort-value=35,937 | 98 years			
Port Welshpool	26 June 1905 || 1 January 1941 || data-sort-value=12,973 | 35 years			
Welshpool Jetty	c. 26 June 1905 || c. 1 January 1941 || data-sort-value=12,973 | Approx. 35 years			

== See also ==
- Narrow gauge lines of the Victorian Railways
