= South Gippsland Railway =

Former tourist railway in Victoria, Australia

Coordinates: 38°25′19″S 145°47′40″E

Overview
- Status: Closed
- Stations: Leongatha to Nyora

Service
- Type: Tourist Railway

History
- Commenced: 15 December 1994
- Closed: 16 January 2016

The South Gippsland Railway was a tourist railway located in South Gippsland, Victoria, Australia. It controlled a section of the former South Gippsland railway line between Nyora and Leongatha, and operated services from Leongatha to Nyora, via Korumburra, the journey taking about 65 minutes.

== History ==
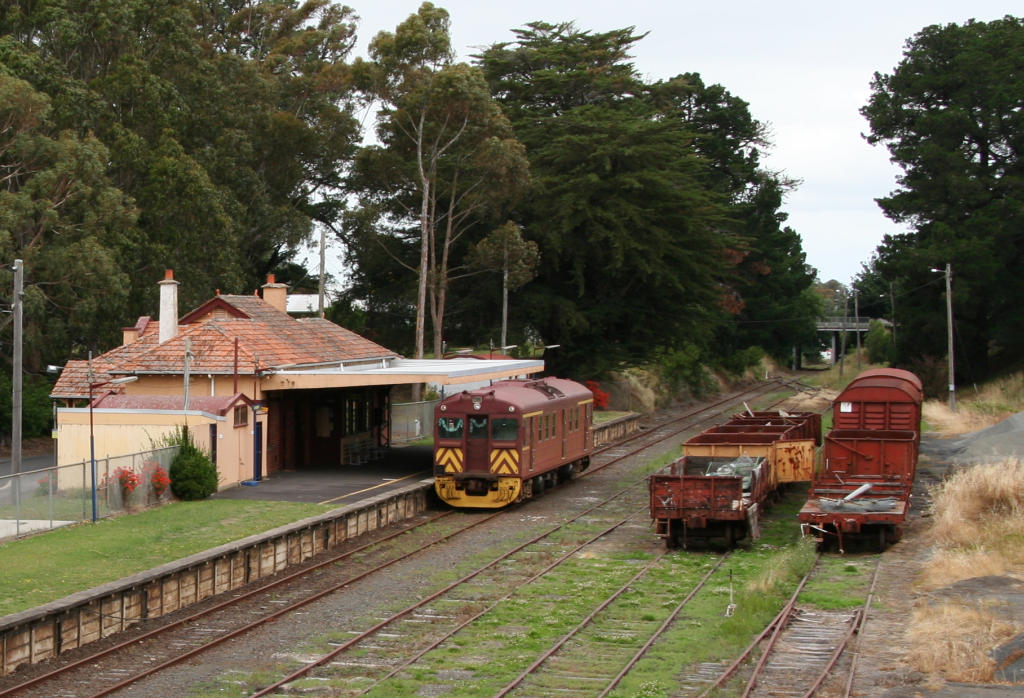
An ex-South Australian Railways Redhen railcar and goods rollingstock at Leongatha station. This area is planned to be a carpark for a new shopping centre.

The South Gippsland line (also known as the Great Southern Railway) was opened from Dandenong to Cranbourne in 1888 and extended to Koo Wee Rup, Nyora and Loch in 1890, Korumburra and Leongatha in 1891. The line had numerous branches which included: the Strzelecki Line; branching from Koo Wee Rup, the Wonthaggi Line; branching from Nyora, the Coal Creek, Austral Coal and Outtrim Lines; branching from Korumburra, Barry's Beach Oil Terminal Line; branching between Toora and Welshpool, and the Port Albert Line branching from Alberton.

South Gippsland Railway Inc. (SGR) was founded in 1990 as a separate entity to the Great Southern Railway Society, based in Nyora, where the two groups worked in partnership but under the banner of the SGTR. In 1994, a section of the South Gippsland railway line, from Lang Lang to Leongatha was leased by the Victorian government to the South Gippsland Railway. Freight trains continued to use the line from Dandenong as far as Koala Siding near Nyora until 1998.

== Regular train services ==
The SGR provided regular Sunday train services, using three train types. These were:

- V.R. Y-class diesel-electric locomotive, number 135, which hauled two or three passenger carriages and goods rolling stock.
- V.R. railmotors RM55 and RM61.
- S.A.R. Redhen diesel railcars, as one- or two-car sets.
- SGR also used the SGR-owned V.R. T-Class diesel-electric locomotive, number 342. At one time it was leased to the now defunct Victorian freight train operator El Zorro, and is currently stored at the Seymour Railway Heritage Centre undergoing current restoration.

During school holiday periods, services were operated on Sundays and Wednesdays.

== Special trains and charters ==
The South Gippsland Railway operated regular Sunday trains on the complete Leongatha to Nyora section. In addition, a number of special trains were run. These included the "Dinner Train", a service providing in-train hospitality, beverages and snacks, with a barbecue-style evening dinner at Korumburra Station. This service ran approximately every two months.

Another special service was the "Murder Mystery Train"—by group booking only—during which an entertainer/host and passengers participated in costume as characters in a drama.

Special "Santa" trains were run for Christmas periods.

== Projects ==
Station works were in progress at both Nyora and Korumburra stations. Korumburra works included the establishment of works sheds, and locomotive and rollingstock stabling sheds. The work commenced in February 2009, and was scheduled to be completed by 30 June that year.

Nyora works included repairs to the station building, including the internal and external wall cladding, establishment of a new safeworking office and public space/meeting facilities in the main room of the station.

Rollingstock refurbishment projects included two ABU First/Second class corridor compartment carriages #32 and #40 being transferred to the railway, and the cleaning and repainting to original colours of various goods wagons.

On 15 June 2010 railmotor 61RM arrived. It is owned by Victorian Goldfields Railway and was on a long-term loan to the South Gippsland Railway for use on its services. 61RM was supplied with a motor unit that was overdue for refurbishment. The motor unit was not suited to the gradients and hills on the South Gippsland Railway line, and the railmotor was withdrawn from service pending a major reconditioning and mechanical overhaul.

Steam locomotive K 190, operated by Steamrail Victoria, was on loan to the railway during the summer of 1995–1996, and the engine and tender was repainted in a more noticeable green. The loco was once again returned for service with the SGR during the summer of 1996–1997. The locomotive was taken back by Steamrail, just prior to the permanent line closure between Nyora and Cranbourne. With the later dismantling of that section of the track, the SGR became a "landlocked" line, no longer able to connect with the greater Victorian rail network.

Other projects included restoring the line from Nyora, north to Cranbourne, which is the current limit of the electrified Melbourne suburban network. Since the line between Cranbourne and Nyora was closed, obstacles to the reinstatement of train services included a toilet block being built over the line at the Koo Wee Rup Bus Interchange and unstable bridges at some locations. After research into the viability of restoration, it was decided that the line between Nyora and Lang Lang (15 km) was the easiest section to refurbish, and discussions were held about the concept and its associated costs.

On 4 December 2015, it was announced that the SGR had suspended all operations until further notice.

== Rollingstock ==
The South Gippsland Railway had a collection of ex-Victorian and South Australian passenger rolling stock. With the closure of the railway, the disposal of the rolling stock is being organised. All privately owned rail vehicles were removed as a first priority, with VicTrack, the owner of the rolling stock, allocating the remainder to other rail heritage groups.

- Y 135 branchline/shunting diesel-electric locomotive (in service at closure)
- RM 55 diesel-electric railmotor (under restoration, completion 2015)
- RM 61 diesel-electric railmotor leased from the Victorian Goldfields Railway (transferred back to Victorian Goldfields Railway 2015)
- RM 402 South Australian railmotor (in service at closure)
- RM 311 South Australian railmotor (in service at closure)
- 17 CW passenger guards/mail van (in service at closure)
- 63 ABW first/second-class passenger car (in service at closure)
- 32 ABU first/second-class passenger car (under restoration, completion 2015)
- 40 ABU first/second-class passenger car (under restoration, completion 2015)
- 34 BE second-class air-conditioned passenger car (in service at closure)
- 19 BE second-class air-conditioned passenger car (stored pending restoration)
- 36 BE second-class passenger car (stored pending restoration)
- 200 MT railmotor trailer (in service at closure) was transferred to Daylesford Spa Country Railway on Friday 18 May 2018
- 24 ZF freight guards van (in service at closure)
- 40 C passenger guards van (stored pending restoration - owned by SGR)
- SGR also had a varied collection of freight rolling stock in service or awaiting restoration.

In early 2017, the Yarra Valley Railway announced on its Facebook page that it had been allocated eleven items from the former SGR.

== Closure ==
The last train ran to Leongatha on the 29 November 2015. At the SGR annual general meeting on 16 January 2016, the membership decided to close the railway, for a number of reasons, including the low number of active volunteer members, and a lack of finance to repair ageing rollingstock and infrastructure.

There had been the possibility that another railway group might take over the assets and lease of the SGR, which could be considered as part of the winding-up provisions of the existing entity. In the 1990s, one such group, the Lang Lang–Leongatha Railway Preservation Society, was formed with a view to examining options for running services on the former SGR line.

== Efforts of Reintroduction ==
The Southern Rail Group sparked interest to reactivate the tourist railway but faced difficulties with having to deal with rail trail supporters and South Gippsland Shire Council members. Before the termination of the previous council, the Southern Rail Group had the support of council and were waiting for approval of lease for the corridor from VicTrack and finalisation of their own plans. Currently the Southern Rail Group has come to a stand still with no support from current council members. The council has more interest in converting the rail corridor to a rail trail after acquiring the lease themselves from VicTrack, but the removal of rail assets proves to be a costly venture.

== Stations ==
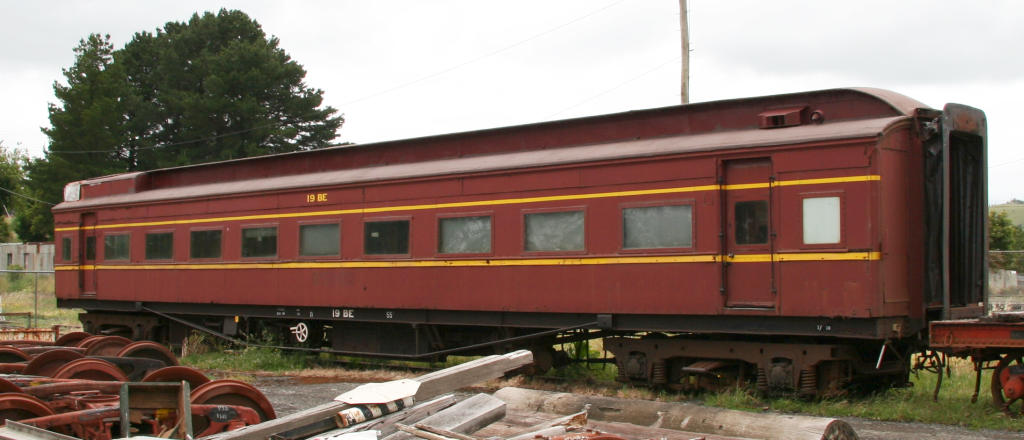
Carriage 19BE at Korumburra

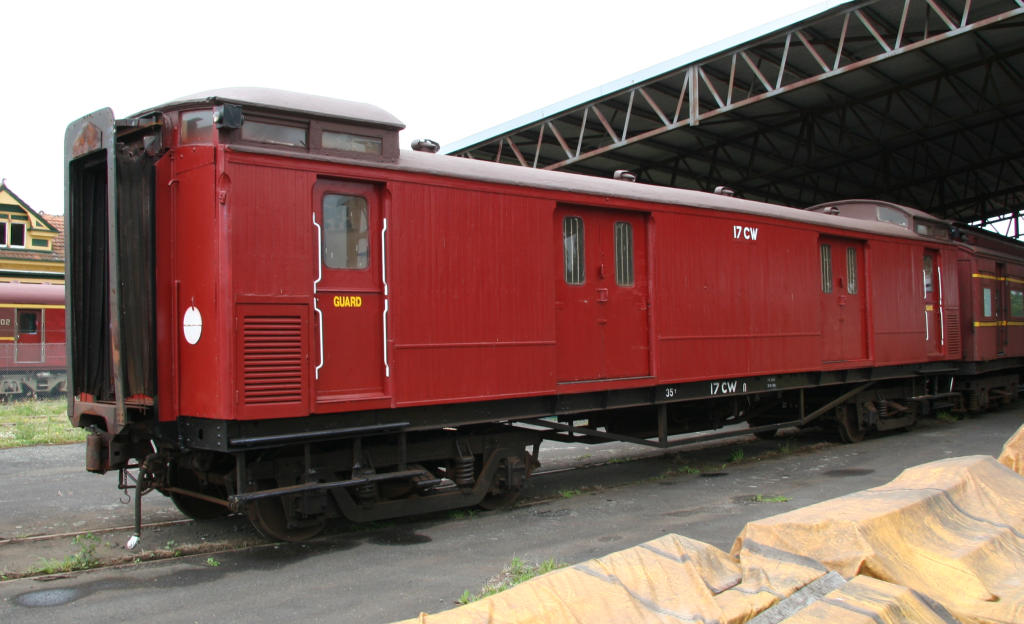
Van 17CW at Korumburra
