= Leongatha railway station =

Railway station in Victoria, Australia

Coordinates: 38°28′38″S 145°56′52″E

Leongatha
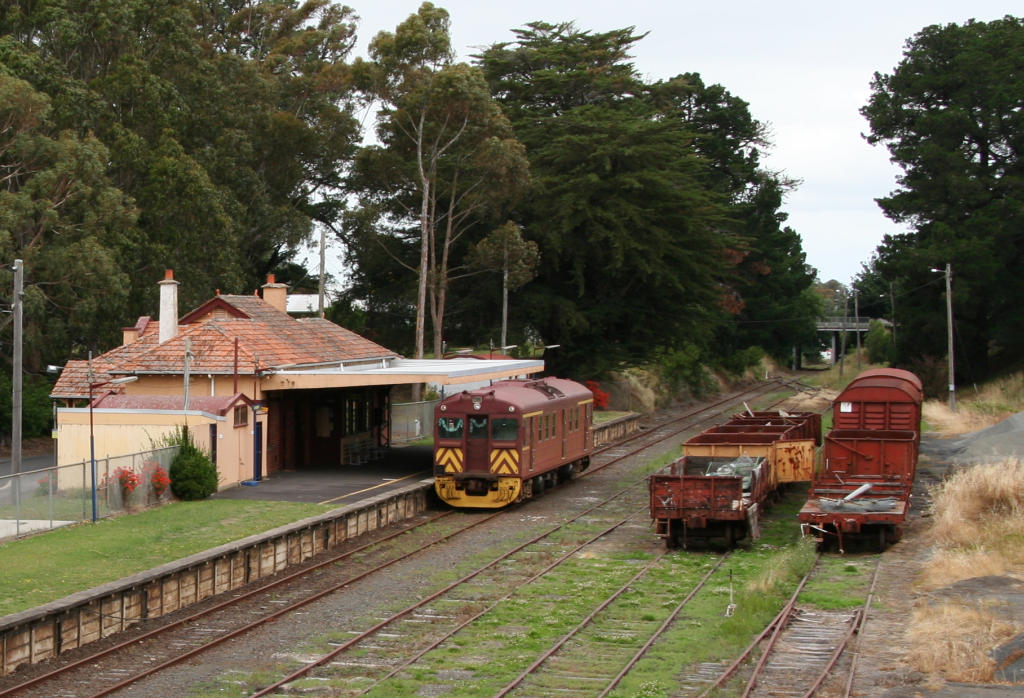
- Former South Australian Railways Redhen railcar No. 402 at Leongatha station, December 2008

General information
- Location: 133.9 km (83.2 mi) from Flinders Street
- System: South Gippsland Railway station
- Line: South Gippsland Railway
- Platforms: 1
- Tracks: 6 (mainline + 5 roads)

Other information
- Status: Closed 16 January 2016

History
- Opened: 17 November 1891; 134 years ago 1994; 32 years ago (re-opened)
- Closed: 24 July 1993; 33 years ago

Services
Preceding station	Disused railways	Following station
	Tourist service	
Korumburra	South Gippsland Tourist Railway line	Terminus
	List of closed railway stations in Victoria	

Former mainline services
Preceding station	VicRail	Following station
Ruby towards Spencer Street	South Gippsland line 1891-1981	Koonwarra towards Yarram
Preceding station	V/Line	Following station
Korumburra towards Spencer Street	South Gippsland line	Terminus
Location

Leongatha is a railway station in the town of Leongatha, Victoria on the former South Gippsland railway line in South Gippsland, Victoria, Australia.

The station opened in 1891 as a terminus, the line being extended to Welshpool the next year. Initially the station was planned to be named "Koorooman", later being changed to "Leongatha" at time of construction. For a number of years after the ending of regular V/Line passenger operations on the line east of Cranbourne in 1993, the station was the terminus of the former South Gippsland Tourist Railway, but its operations ceased in January 2016.

The track south of Leongatha has been dismantled and turned into the Great Southern Rail Trail. The station precinct includes a well preserved red brick station building, goods shed, water tower and footbridge. The goods shed has since been demolished with a view of converting the unused railway reservation for a shopping plaza, which has not yet eventuated.

The track east of Leongatha Station ended at the rear of a petrol station, approx 500 metres away. The home signal for trains approaching Leongatha from Koonwarra remained, but because there was no rail for any significant distance from the signal, it was decommissioned. From the end of the rails, the reservation is a crushed rock pathway mainly used by bicycles and pedestrians.

The South Gippsland Shire Council had successfully attained an 18-year lease of the 35 km railway corridor from Leongatha to Nyora. Its intention for the corridor is to remove the railway tracks and replace it with a bicycle track aimed to attract a Melbourne-based tourism market.

Regardless of community representations to the Victorian state government seeking the return of railway services, the council has, since January 2020 commenced works to remove the railway infrastructure from the railway reservation from Leongatha station to Nyora station. 2024 New park with flying fox toilets and a bbq area have been added. New bridge access to Bair Street.

== Current status ==
The reopening the South Gippsland railway line as far as Leongatha is continuing to feature as a prominent issue for the region.

The line was first closed along with numerous other regional Victorian railways by the Lonie Report in 1981. The Transport Users Group was successful campaigning to have passenger rail services reinstated to Leongatha on 9 December 1984.

The line would again be closed first to Barry Beach and Yarram in 1992, and then to Leongatha in July 1993.

The promise in 1999 to revive the railway line for freight and passenger services, by the Steve Bracks-led Victorian state Labor government, was abandoned in 2008 by his successor John Brumby. A community campaign involving the South and West Gippsland Transport Group is continuing to work collaboratively with key stakeholders and governments to have rail services reinstated, and generally improve transport accessibility in the region. The South and West Gippsland Transport Group, a public transport and rail lobby group, established in April 2011, is closely associated with the South Gippsland Shire Council and other local governments. It has continued to campaign for an integrated transport plan in the region, which includes rail at the forefront of the proposal.

A South Gippsland Shire Council Priority Projects documents released in June 2013 acknowledged that the return of rail as a major community priority where funding and support are sought from all forms of level government. In early 2014, a report into the extensions of the Melbourne metropolitan rail system identified the population growth corridor from Cranbourne to Koo-Wee-Rup along the disused Leongatha line as a key planning priority.

== V/Line bus terminus ==
Leongatha Railway Station is used as a terminus for the V/Line Road Coach service, and as a stop on the Coach route to Yarram. The railway station toilet facilities have recently become available to V/Line bus passengers. As of 2017, these toilet facilities have been closed, although a newer toilet was provided at the stop in recent years.

== Location ==
Leongatha Railway Station is located on Long street, Leongatha. Long Street is accessible from the Strzelecki Highway and Nerrena Road, just off the South Gippsland Highway.

== Trains from Leongatha ==
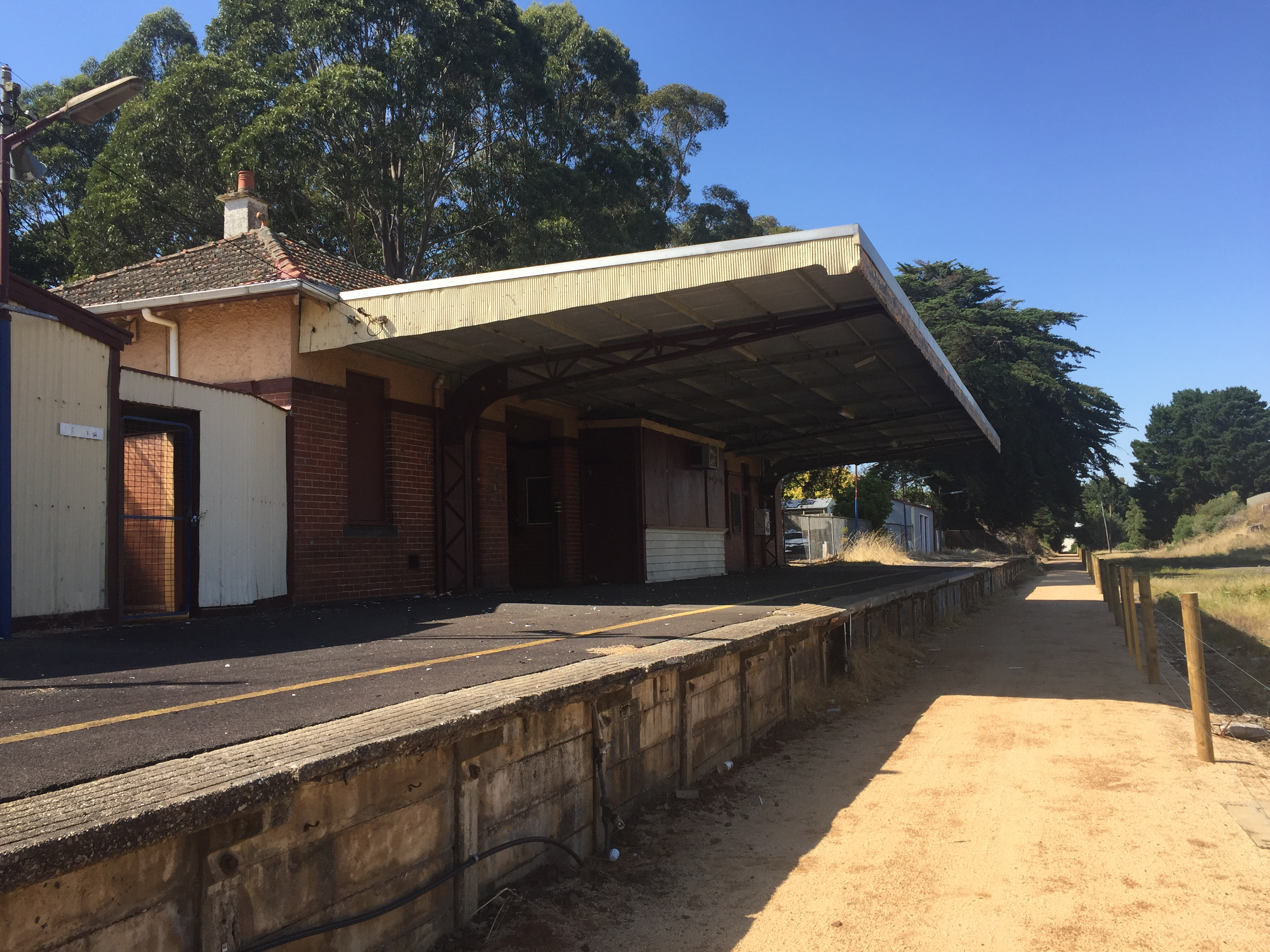
The disused station in March 2022

Since the closure of the South Gippsland Tourist Railway, no train services operate from Leongatha Station.

== V/Line coach services ==
To compensate for the government not re-opening the railway to Leongatha for passenger services, a new bus timetable provided for additional services from Spencer Street Station (now Southern Cross station) in Melbourne to Leongatha and Yarram.

The current timetable provides for eight coach services daily, four of which continue through to the former railway terminus at Yarram. Weekend timetables provide for four services on each of Saturday and Sunday.

The increased timetable had proven popular, with some services needing two coaches to cope with the traffic.

== Gallery ==
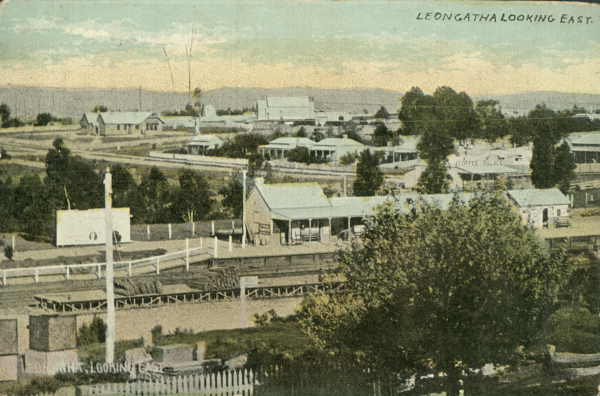
Leongatha railway station in 1906, looking east

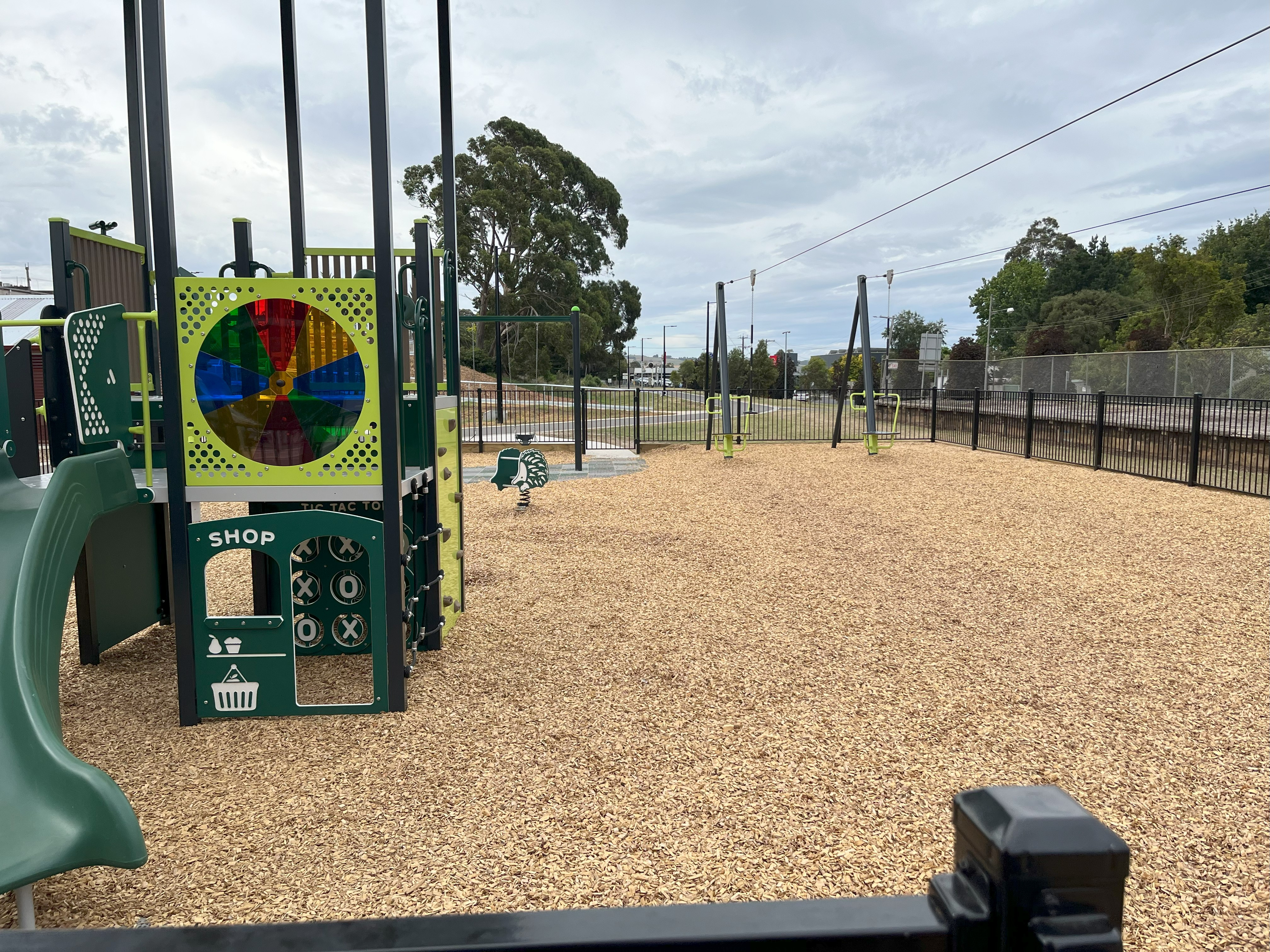
Railway park flying fox

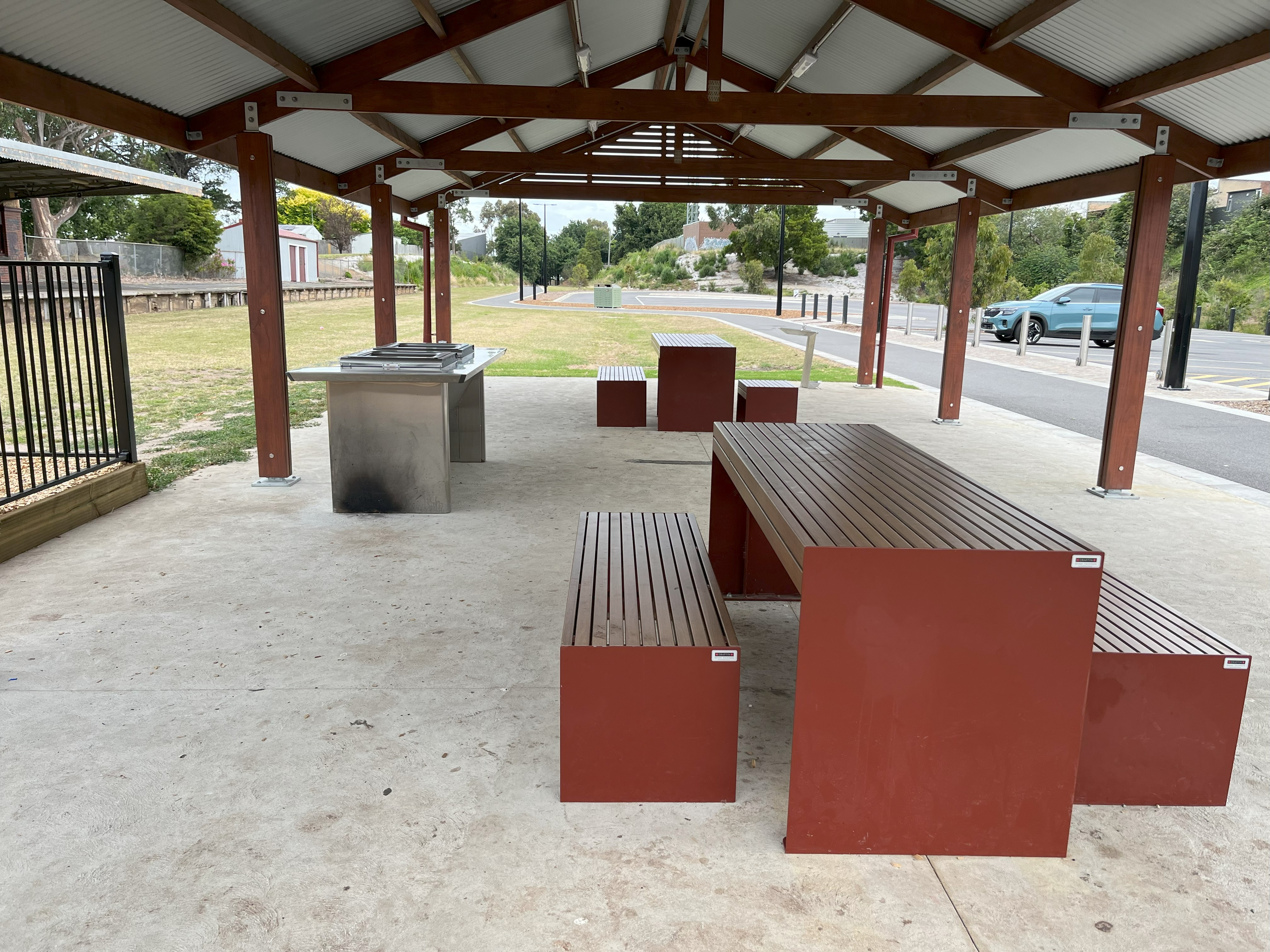
Railway park bbq area

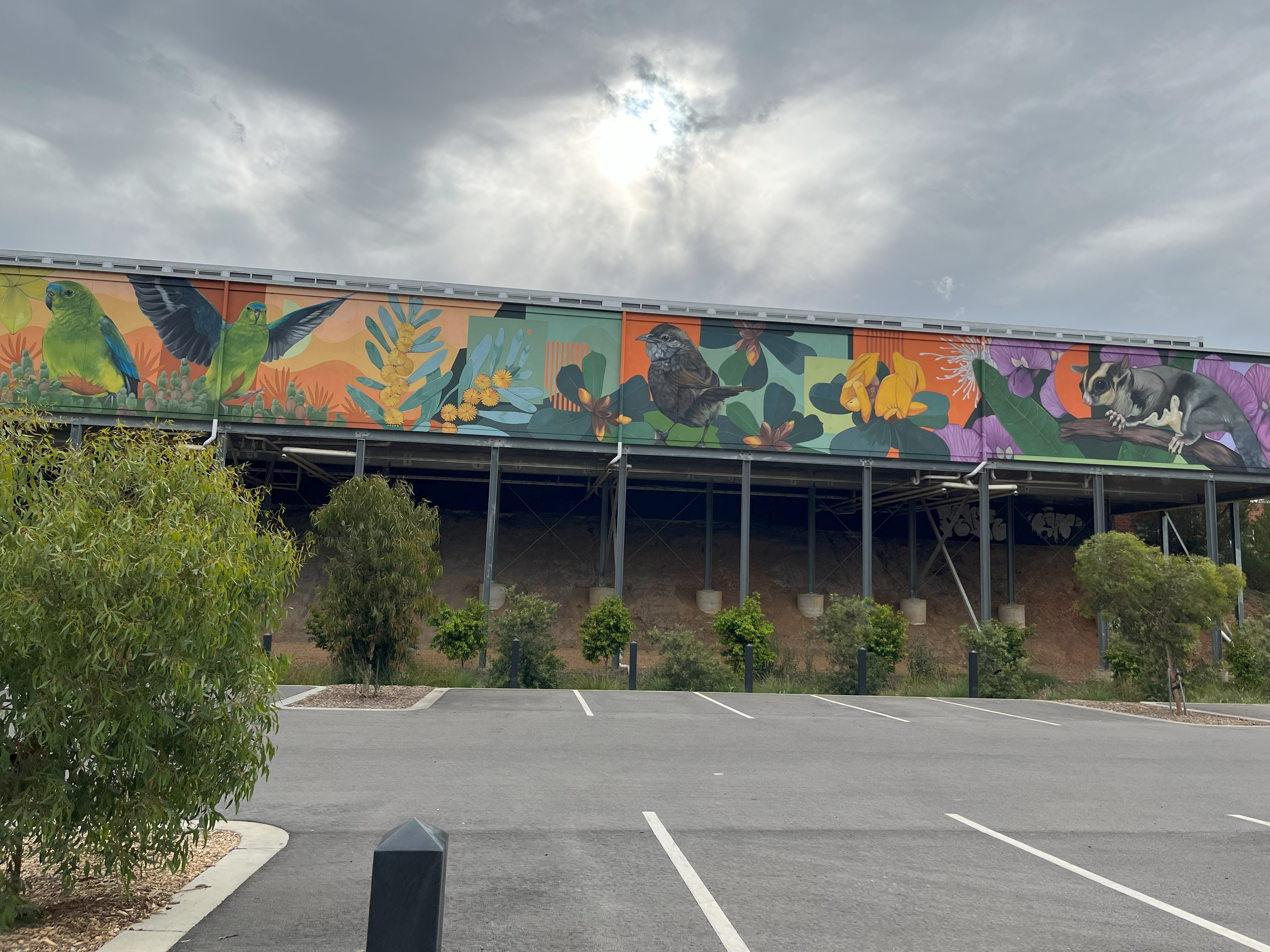
Rear of Bair Street shops with Art Work
