= Diesel Electric railmotor (VR) =

Class of Victorian Railways railmotor

Diesel Electric Rail Motor (DERM)
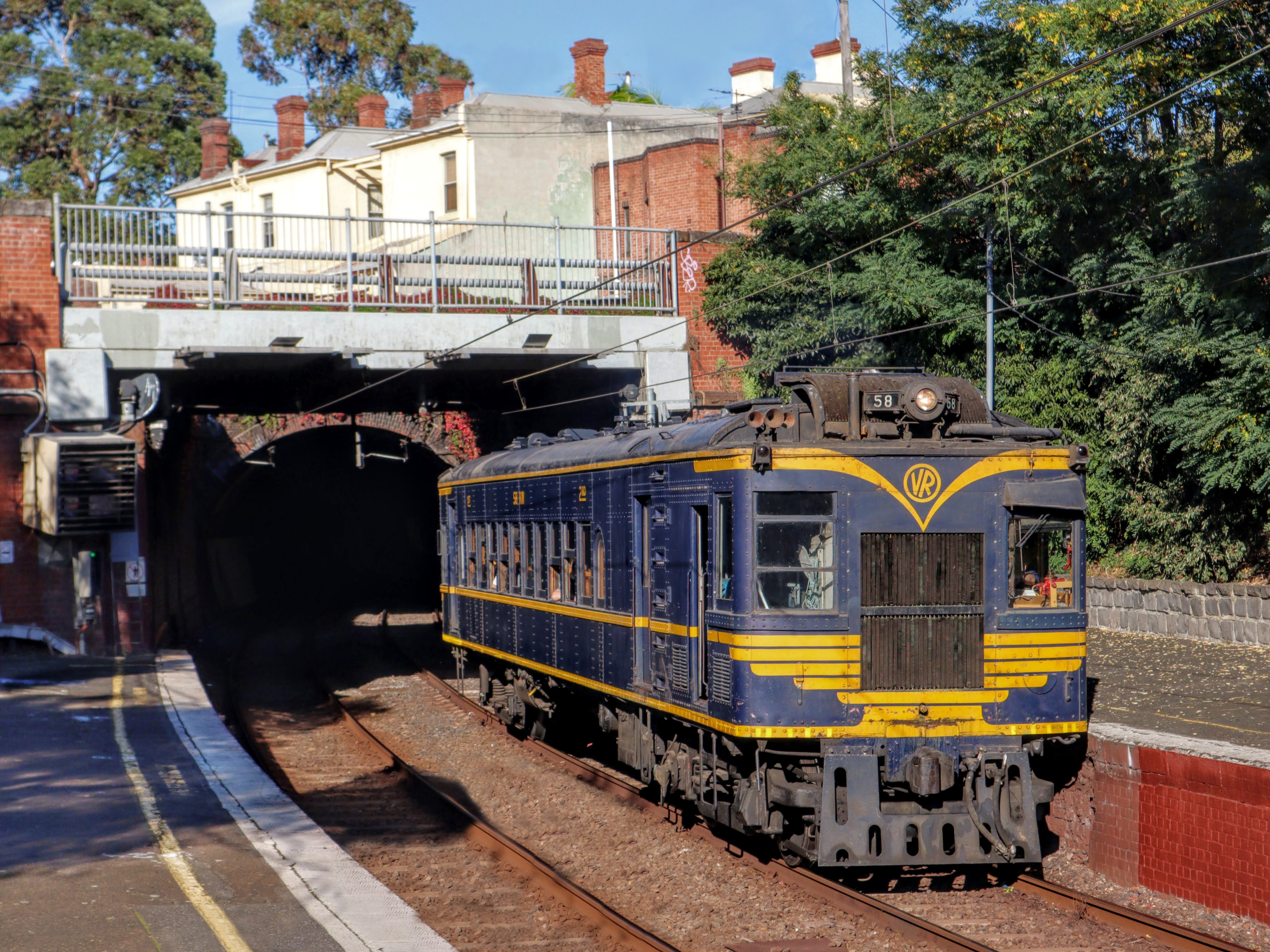
- Preserved 58RM passes through West Richmond on a heritage trip to Mernda
Type and origin
- Power type: Diesel engine, Originally Petrol
- Designer: Electro-Motive Corporation
- Builder: Newport Workshops
- Build date: 1928–1931
- Total produced: 10
Specifications
- Gauge: 5 ft 3 in (1,600 mm)
- Length: 58 ft (18 m)
- Loco weight: 43.07 long tons (43.76 t; 48.24 short tons)
- Fuel type: Originally Petrol, converted to Diesel fuel
- Fuel capacity: 750 litres (200 US gal)
- Engine type: 220 hp Winton six-cylinder petrol engine (Petrol); 2 x Series 71 twin six-cylinder diesel engines (Diesel)
- Generator: General Electric DT 501E2
- Traction motors: 2 x General Electric GE 273A
Performance figures
- Maximum speed: 100 kilometres per hour (60 mph)
- Power output: 220 hp (Petrol), 255 bhp (Diesel)
Career
- Operators: Victorian Railways, V/Line
- Number in class: 10
- Numbers: 55RM–64RM
- First run: 1928

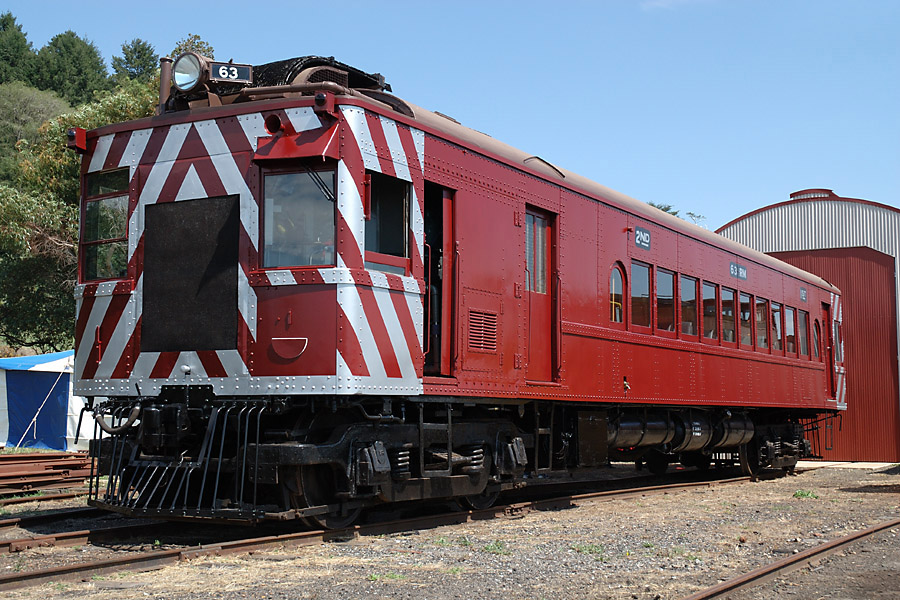
RM 63 as restored by DSCR in 2007

RM 55 as a PERM pre 1952

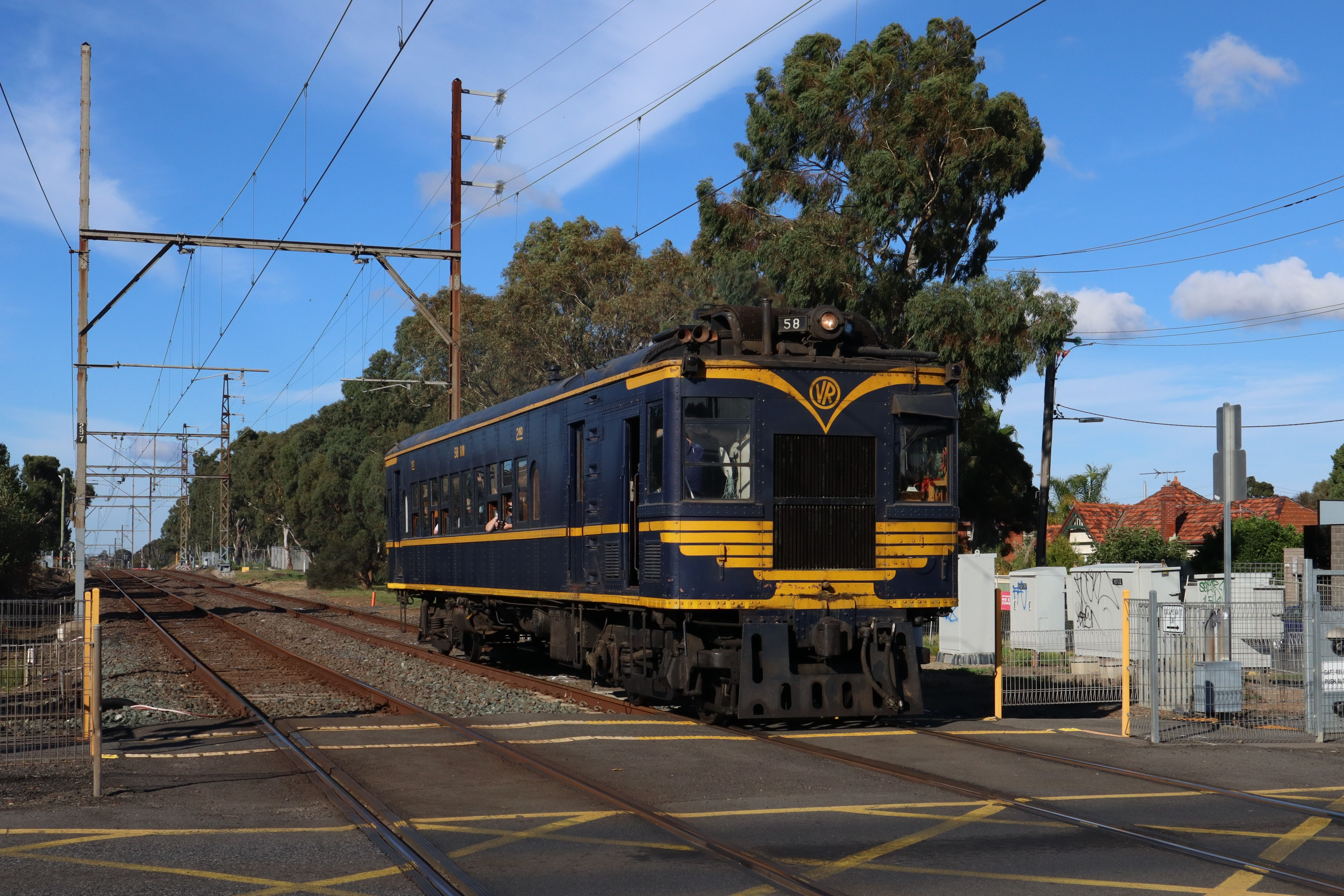
RM 58 Passes Thornbury on DERMPAV's Outer Suburban Tour 2022

The Diesel Electric Rail Motor (DERM) is a type of railmotor operated by the Victorian Railways in Australia.

== History ==
Originally built as a petrol electric rail motor (PERM), they were the longest-lived rail motor on the Victorian Railways, with the first entering service in 1928 and the last being withdrawn in 1991.

The rail motor, also known as the railcar, was a standard product of the US Electro-Motive Corporation (a predecessor of Electro-Motive Diesel) and built between 1924 and 1932, albeit to a smaller loading gauge and wider track gauge. The first was imported in 1927, assembled at Newport Workshops, and placed in service in 1928, initially running services to Bacchus Marsh. The bodies of the remaining nine were constructed at Newport Workshops using imported equipment and electrical components, and placed in service between 1930 and 1931.

The rail motors were initially powered by a 220 hp (160 kW) Winton Motor Carriage Company petrol engine. When those wore out in the early 1950s, they were replaced with twin GM Detroit Diesel Series 71 engines, with a power output of 275 bhp (205 kW), de-rated to match the original 220 hp (160 kW) generator.

A DERM, with a DERM Trailer car attached, ran a regular passenger service on the South Gippsland line in the 1960s and 1970s. By the 1970s, the longest scheduled journey run by a DERM was the Bendigo to Robinvale run, last operated on 3 June 1978.

In 1976, RM 56 was fitted with a new seating arrangement, including rotating seats, using components from the Z carriage fleet. Capacity was reduced to 34 passengers, because the new seating arrangement was two either side of the central aisle rather than the previous two and three. The first-class end of the vehicle was moved towards the centre, closer to the engine, but providing a smoother ride by averaging the suspension of both bogies rather than just one. The trial arrangement was used on the Yarrawonga line, but patronage did not increase sufficiently to justify the retention of that service.

Following the changes to 56RM, 55RM and 61RM were extensively modified in the late 1970s, with the engines relocated, the body extended, and a new seating arrangement provided. The most obvious external difference was the fitting of aluminium-framed windows on the driver's cabin, and porthole windows for the engine room. Those "Super DERMs" were a familiar sight on the adjoining Mornington and Stony Point lines prior to the early 1980s.

Revised carriage working plans from 2 August 1987 required only two DERMs in service Monday to Thursday, with a third on Friday and Saturday and none on Sundays. As at 6 August the disposition was 56, 58, 63 and 64RM in service, though 64RM was "believed to be incapable of towing a trailer"; 55RM and 62RM were both being repaired at Bendigo Workshops, soon to be joined by 61RM, while 59RM and 60RM had both been withdrawn.

== Class summary ==
=== Motor units ===
Railmotor	Entered service	Upgraded to DERM	Withdrawn	Current owner	Current allocation	Current status	Notes
55RM "Super DERM"	1928-03-07	1952-10-27	1993	VicTrack Heritage	Allocated to Yarra Valley Railway	Under Restoration	"Super DERM"; formerly at South Gippsland Railway
56RM	1930-03-29	1952-08-29		VicTrack Heritage	Steamrail Victoria, Ballarat	Pending restoration	Upgraded interior pre Super DERM program
57RM	1930-04-16	1952-12-30	1982			Scrapped	
58RM	1930-05-03	1952-05-10		VicTrack Heritage	Allocated to Diesel Electric Rail Motor Preservation Association of Victoria	Preserved; operational	
59RM	1930-05-14	1953-05-23		Diesel Electric Rail Motor Preservation Association of Victoria	Diesel Electric Rail Motor Preservation Association of Victoria	Supply of spare parts	Formerly with Mornington Railway, transferred September 2015
60RM	1930-06-18	1951-10-29		Diesel Electric Rail Motor Preservation Association of Victoria	Diesel Electric Rail Motor Preservation Association of Victoria	Pending restoration	Stored at Newport Workshops
61RM "Super DERM"	1930-06-21	1953-10-29	1978	Victorian Goldfields Railway	Victorian Goldfields Railway	Preserved; operational	"Super DERM"
62RM	1930-07-21	1952-01-26		Daylesford Spa Country Railway	Daylesford Spa Country Railway	Stored; Pending restoration	
63RM	1930-08-07	1952-12-06		Daylesford Spa Country Railway	Daylesford Spa Country Railway	Preserved; operational	
64RM	1931-04-27	1952-07-26		Diesel Electric Rail Motor Preservation Association of Victoria	Diesel Electric Rail Motor Preservation Association of Victoria	Under restoration	

=== Trailers ===
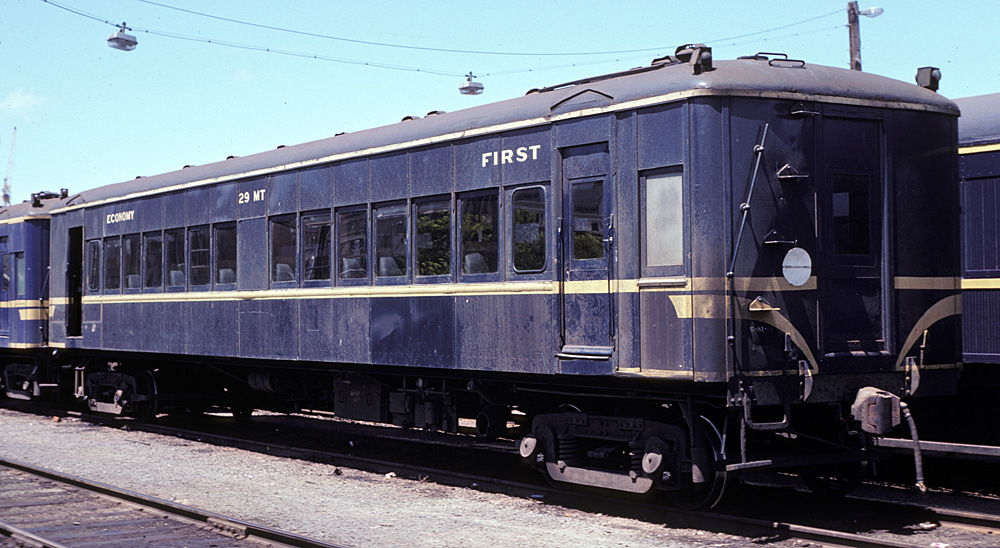
Motor Trailer 29 in 1982

Railmotor	Entered service	Withdrawn	Scrapped	Current status	Notes
26MT	1930-04-29	1982-11-16		Preserved - Stored?	Daylesford Spa Country Railway
27MT	1930-04-29	1982-11-19		Static?	Sold to somewhere in Wilson's Pormontory
28MT	1930-10-04	1981-06-09	1981-08-17	Static?	Body last seen in Dandenong
29MT	1930-09-26	1982-11-19		Static?	Sold to somewhere in Narre Warren
30MT	1930-09-26	1982-11-19		Static?	Body on Property - Echuca

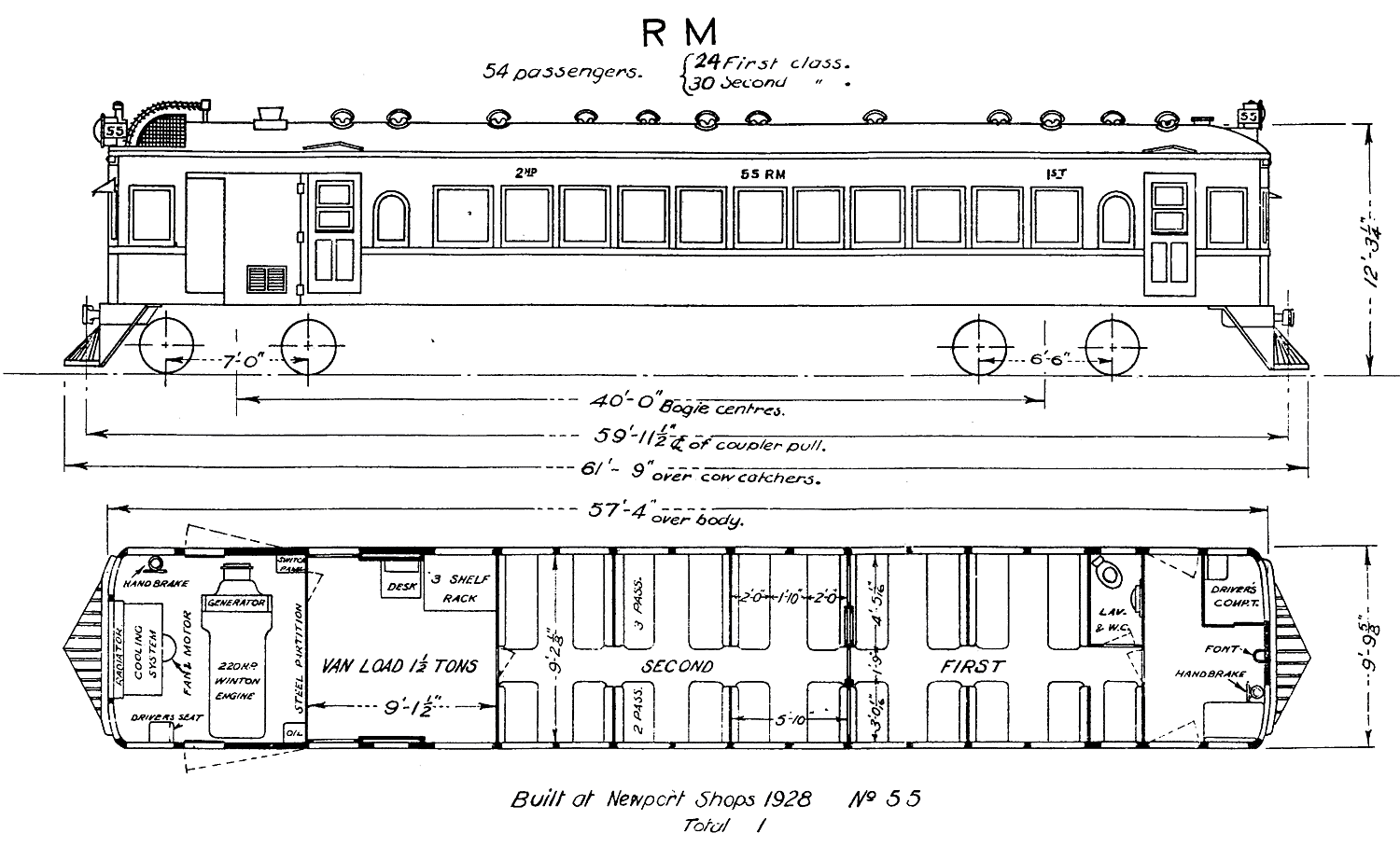
Diagram of VR Railmotors

== Preservation ==
All but one of the DERMs have survived into preservation, with 57RM being the only DERM to have been scrapped. Four are operational, with the remaining five in various conditions, generally as a source of spare parts with long-term restoration in mind.

Of the regular DERMs, 58RM, operated by the Diesel Electric Rail Motor Preservation Association of Victoria, regularly runs tours on the Melbourne and Victorian broad gauge system, and 63RM runs trips on the Daylesford line with trailer 26MT when appropriate.

55RM is allocated to the Newport Railway Museum but was sub-allocated to the South Gippsland Railway. When the latter closed in 2016, it moved to the Yarra Valley Tourist Railway. 61RM operates on the Victorian Goldfields Railway between Maldon and Castlemaine.

28MT was sold privately, and as of 1998 was on private property in Dandenong.

== See also ==
- Tourist and Heritage Railways Act
- Doodlebug (rail car)
- Weitzer railmotor
