= Robinvale railway station =

Former railway station in Victoria, Australia

Coordinates: 34°35′05″S 142°46′12″E

Robinvale
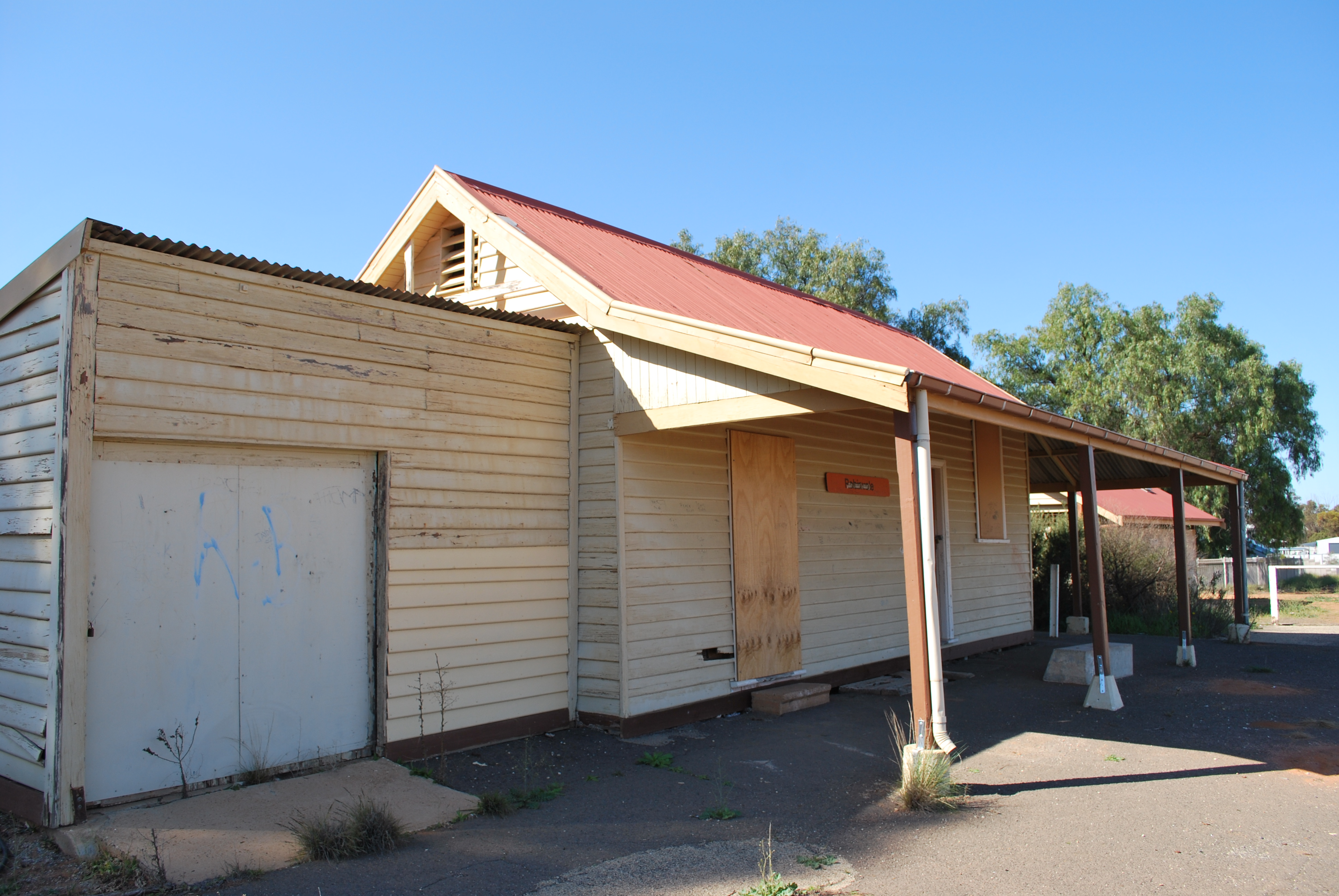
- Track side of the Robinvale station building

General information
- Line: Robinvale
- Platforms: 1
- Tracks: 1

Other information
- Status: Closed

History
- Opened: 1924
- Closed: To passengers on 3 June 1978

Services
Preceding station	Disused railways	Following station
Bannerton	Robinvale line	Terminus
	List of closed railway stations in Victoria	
Location

Robinvale station in Robinvale, Victoria, Australia, is the terminus of the Robinvale railway line. Since the termination of passenger service on the line in 1978, the station only sees freight services, although the station platform is currently intact.
