= Welshpool railway station, Victoria =

Former railway station in Victoria, Australia

Coordinates: 38°39′56″S 146°26′21″E

Welshpool

General information
- Line: South Gippsland
- Platforms: 1
- Tracks: 2

Other information
- Status: Closed

History
- Opened: 1892; 134 years ago
- Closed: 6 June 1981; 45 years ago (Station); 1990; 36 years ago (Line)

Services
Preceding station	VicRail	Following station
Agnes towards Spencer Street	South Gippsland line	Hedley towards Yarram
Location

Welshpool was a railway station on the South Gippsland line in South Gippsland, Victoria. The station formerly served the small town of Welshpool. The station was opened during the 1890s and operated until the 1980s. The site of the station contains a preserved platform and the base of its crane. The station no longer contains the tiny building that was donated to Loch station. Between 26 June 1905 and 1 January 1941, a horse-drawn 762 mm (2 ft 6 in) narrow gauge branch line, just under 5 kilometres (3.1 mi) long, ran from Welshpool station to Welshpool Jetty. Near the former station is Welshpool Hospital.
