= Lang Lang railway station =

Former railway station in Victoria, Australia

Coordinates: 38.2659°S 145.5679°E

Lang Lang

General information
- Line: South Gippsland
- Platforms: 1
- Tracks: 2 (3 till 1994)

Other information
- Status: Closed

History
- Opened: 11 November 1890; 135 years ago
- Closed: 24 July 1993; 33 years ago (Passenger)

Services
Preceding station	VicRail	Following station
Monomeith towards Spencer Street	South Gippsland line	Nyora towards Yarram
Preceding station	V/Line	Following station
Koo Wee Rup towards Spencer Street	South Gippsland line	Nyora towards Leongatha
Location

Lang Lang was a railway station on the South Gippsland railway line in South Gippsland, Victoria, Australia. The station operated until the closure of the line between Cranbourne Station and Leongatha Station in 1993. This station remains partially intact with its platform and signals still in reasonable condition, as well as the track along this section.

== Current status ==
Between 1999 and 2008 there was constant speculation that the railway line beyond Cranbourne to Leongatha could re-open, as promised by the Victorian State Government, under a project named 'Bringing Trains Back to Victorians'. However, in May 2008, a scoping study carried out on behalf of the State Government found the costs of returning services high, at $72 million. Therefore, plans to reopen the line were stopped, and the Government has pledged to spend $14.2 million on improved V/Line coach services in the South Gippsland region instead. Further, there are plans in motion to turn the railway reservation into a Rail Trail between Cranbourne East and Nyora. Additionally, various proposals have included extending the South Gippsland Tourist Railway service to Lang Lang, in which would increase the length of the privately operated railway to 50 kilometres.

Reopening the South Gippsland railway line as far as Leongatha is continuing to feature as a prominent issue for the region. A South Gippsland Shire Council Priority Projects documents released in June 2013 acknowledged that the return of rail as a major community priority where funding and support are sought from all forms of level government. In early 2014, a report into the extensions of the Melbourne metropolitan rail system identified the population growth corridor from Cranbourne to Koo-Wee-Rup along the disused Leongatha line as a key planning priority. The South and West Gippsland Transport Group, a public transportation and rail lobby group established in April 2011 that is closely associated with the South Gippsland Shire Council and local forms of government has continued to campaign for an integrated transport plan in the region, which includes rail at the forefront of the proposal. Previously, the group was classified as the South Gippsland Transport Users Group and had amalgamated with numerous rail lobby groups in 1994 shortly after the rail passenger service to Leongatha was withdrawn in July 1993 and the line to Barry Beach and Yarram was formally closed in June 1992 and dismantled by December 1994. One notable milestone that this group achieved in the past was running a successful campaign that saw passenger rail services reinstated to Leongatha on 9 December 1984. Despite the political promise to revive the railway line for freight and passenger services by the Steve Bracks led Victorian state Labor government in 1999 being abandoned in 2008 by his successor John Brumby, a public community campaign involving the South and West Gippsland Transport Group is continuing to lobby and work collaboratively with key stakeholders and governments to reinstate rail services that focuses on improving transport accessibility in the region.
