= Loch, Victoria =

Loch
- Town
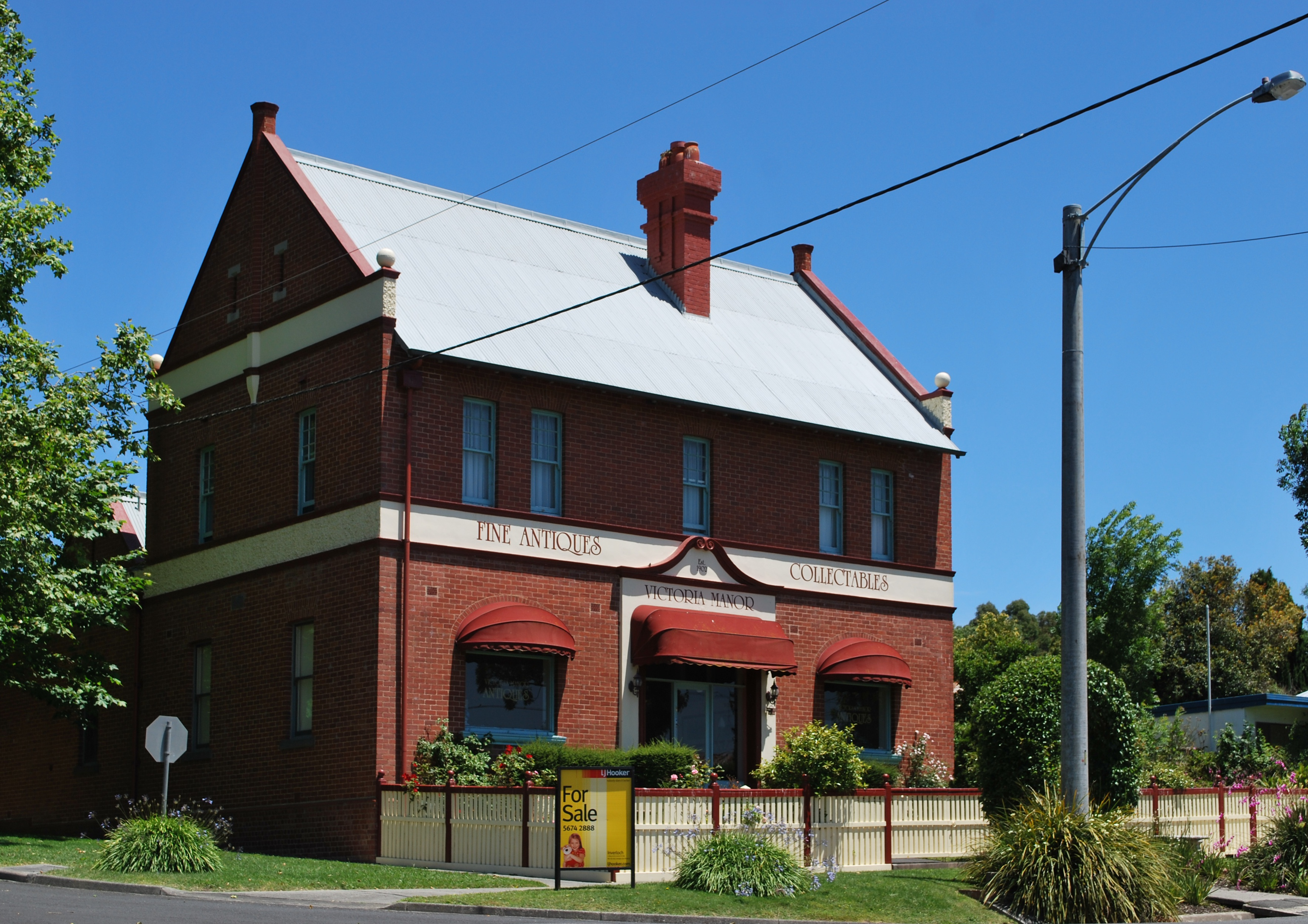
- Victoria Manor, an antique shop in Loch. Now the Loch Brewery & Distillery.

- Coordinates: 38°22′08″S 145°42′23″E
- Country: Australia
- State: Victoria
- LGA: South Gippsland Shire
- Established: 1876

Government
  - State electorate: Gippsland South
  - Federal division: Monash

Population
  - Total: 707 (2021 census)
- Postcode: 3945

Loch is a town in the South Gippsland region of Victoria, Australia which was established in 1876. The town was named in honour of the Governor of Victoria, Henry Loch.

== Transport ==
Loch was formerly situated along the South Gippsland railway corridor that operated to its terminus at Yarram in the early 1980s and Leongatha in the mid-1990s. A V/Line road coach service replaced the rail service to Leongatha on 24 July 1993, running between Melbourne and Yarram. However, since the closure of the South Gippsland rail line with the exception of the locally run tourist railway between Nyora and Leongatha by the Kennett Victorian government on 14 December 1994, the South and West Gippsland Transport Group represented by the local council are campaigning for the rail services to be reinstated beyond the current terminus at Cranbourne by the 2020s.

The Great Southern Rail Trail follows the old South Gippsland railway line route from Loch to Port Welshpool.
