= Port Welshpool =

- Town
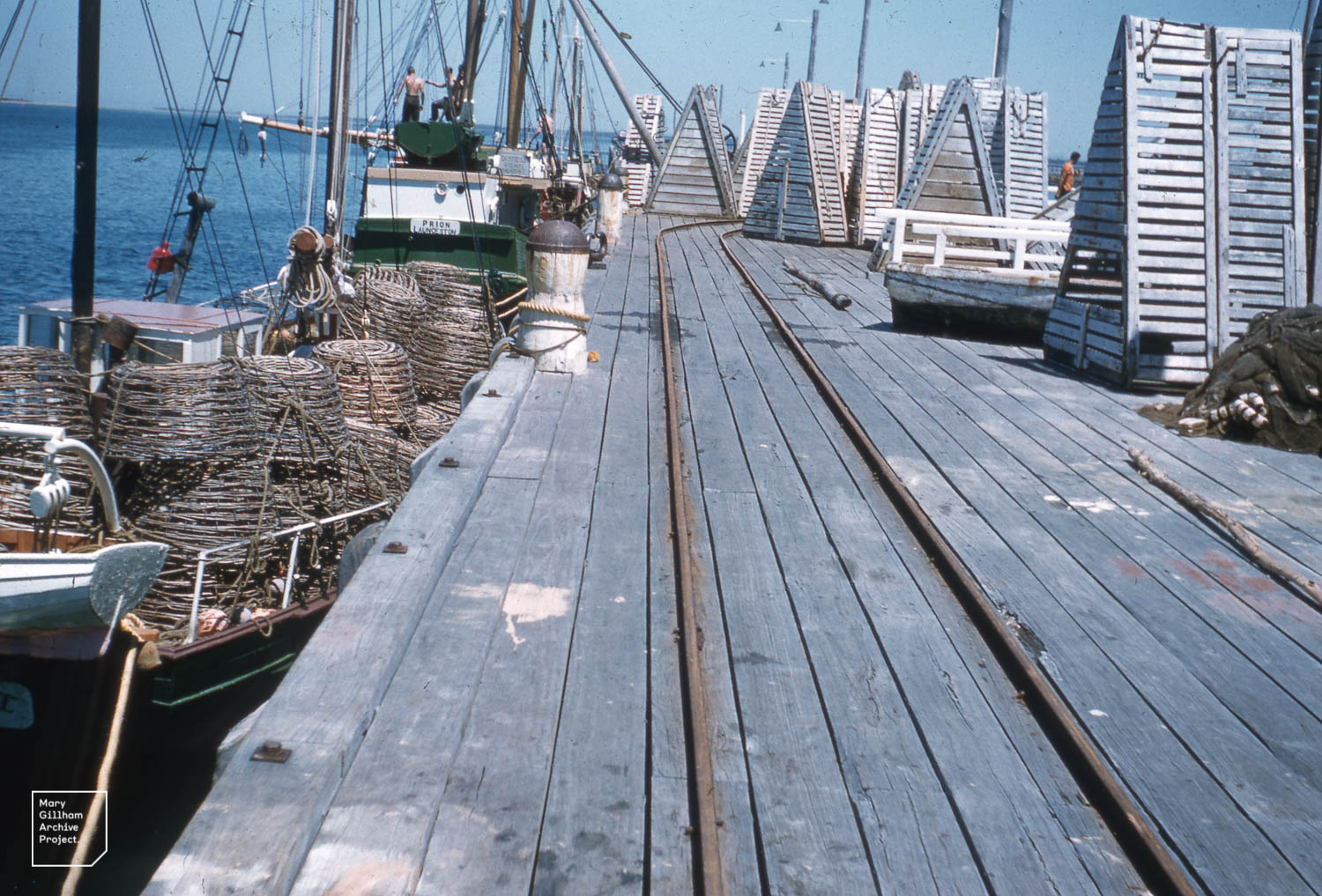
- Crayfish boats at Port Welshpool, 1958

- Coordinates: 38°41′59″S 146°27′53″E
- Country: Australia
- State: Victoria
- LGA: South Gippsland Shire

Government
  - State electorate: Gippsland South
  - Federal division: Monash

Population
  - Total: 220 (SAL 2021)
- Postcode: 3965

Port Welshpool is a town in the South Gippsland region of Victoria, Australia. It is located 191 km south-east of Melbourne, on Corner Inlet and in 2006 had a population of 191. A key book on the history of Welshpool and Port Welshpool is ‘Welshpool: The Story of a Gippsland Port and Town’ by Donald John Linforth which can be found at the National Library of Australia (https://catalogue.nla.gov.au/catalog/6616277).

== Jetty ==
The jetty was reconstructed prior to World War II to facilitate the berthing of naval vessels, and is the third-longest wooden jetty still standing in Australia. It reverted to commercial uses after the war, but a fire on the pier in June 2003 resulted in WorkSafe Victoria issuing a closure notice.

The jetty has since been re-furbished in 2019–2020 and now open for tourism, along with a plan for Victoria's first underwater observatory.

== See also ==
- Welshpool Jetty railway line
