= Welshpool, Victoria =

Welshpool Victoria
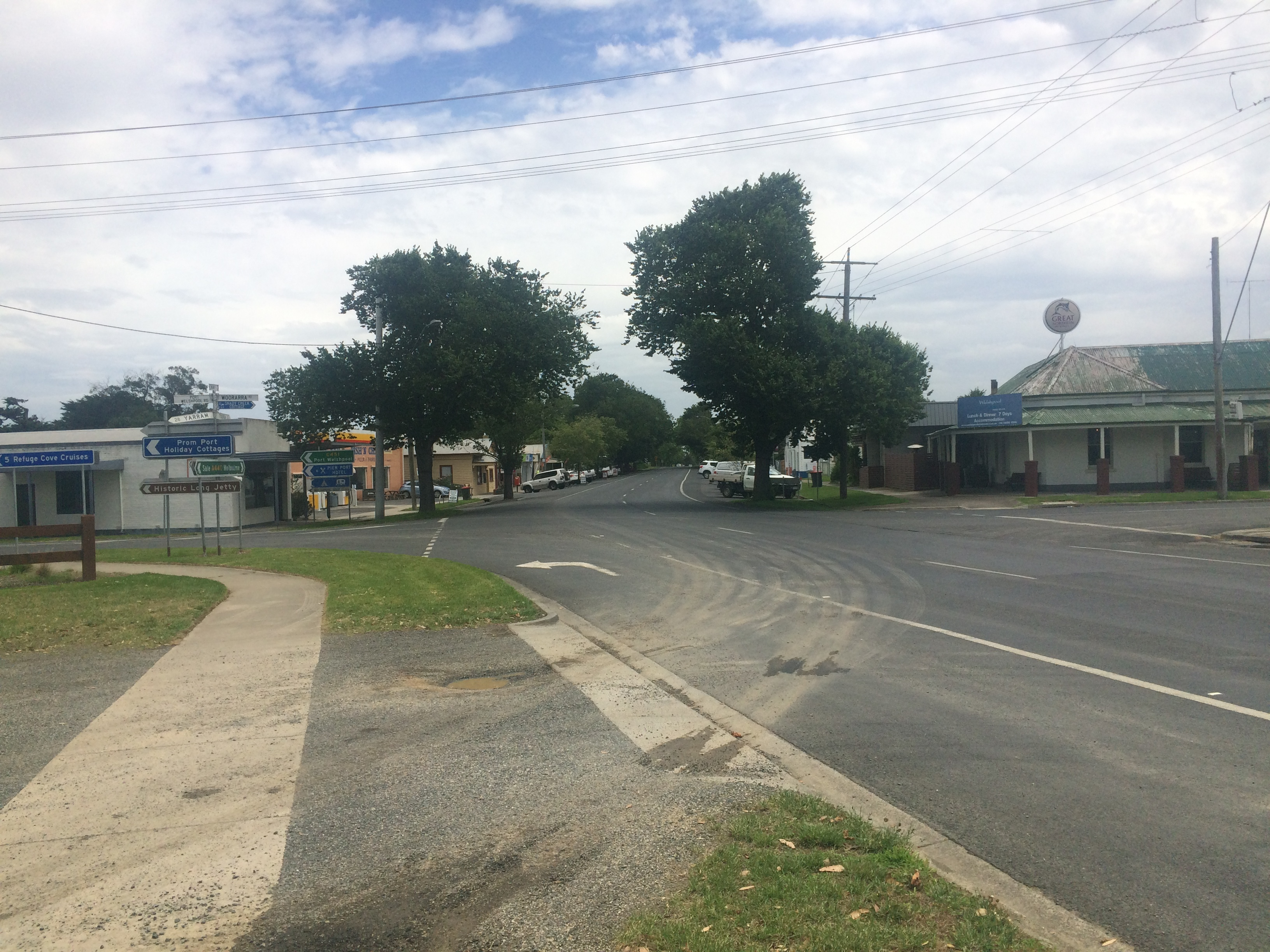
- Welshpool Main Street, 2022

- Coordinates: 38°40′S 146°26′E
- Population: 331 (2016 census)
- Postcode(s): 3966
- LGA(s): South Gippsland Shire
- State electorate(s): Gippsland South
- Federal division(s): Monash

Welshpool is a town in the South Gippsland region of Victoria, Australia. At the 2016 census, Welshpool had a population of 331.

Welshpool is a town with lots to offer with many shops from general stores, fuel station, hotel motel and a rural transaction centre supported by Bendigo Bank. Close proximity to Port Welshpool beach and boat ramp.
