= Barry Beach railway line =

Former railway line in Victoria, Australia

Coordinates: 38°42′21″S 146°23′21″E

Barry Beach in Australia was a railway branch line that opened on 2 April 1969 to service the oil fields in Bass Strait. During the existence of the branch line, twice or occasionally thrice weekly diesel fuel supplies were delivered to the Barry Beach Marine Terminal in order to serve the large ocean vessels that serviced the Bass Strait oil rigs south of Corner Inlet. The oil train was not the only main source of freight transported beyond Leongatha as the once or at times twice weekly superphosphate goods freight trains serving nearby farming communities and townships would usually combine in a mixed goods train configuration. The Esso-Mobil Barry Beach oil rail freight service operated until the closure of the South Gippsland line beyond Leongatha on 30 June 1992 and the branch line itself was eventually dismantled in 1994. The oil fields in Bass Strait are still active with ocean ships still transporting the oil drilled from the still active Exxon-Mobil Marine Terminal at Barry Beach situated in Corner Inlet.

The terminus was the southernmost mainland section of Australia's linked railway tracks. The branch line to Lavers Hill and Crowes, at the Melba Gully Road, went slightly further south, but did not link to the mainline Victorian network as it was a narrower gauge.
