= List of closed railway stations in Victoria =

Overview map.

This is a list of former railway stations and railway lines in Victoria, Australia. Many of these stations and lines have been abandoned or demolished. There is a strong desire by communities to have many of these re-opened to better link Regional Victoria to the state capital Melbourne. Public transport has become increasingly popular in the 21st century for convenience and affordability reasons.

== Mildura line ==
Originally withdrawn on 12 September 1993. Once served by The Vinelander service, the line branches from the Serviceton line at Ballarat.

- Tourello
- Dunolly
- St Arnaud
- Donald
- Birchip
- Ouyen
- Red Cliffs
- Irymple
- Mildura

== Leongatha line ==
The passenger service was withdrawn on 24 July 1993, but the Dandenong to Cranbourne section was later electrified and became part of the Melbourne suburban rail network in 1995.

- Cranbourne East (Proposed - station does not exist)
- Clyde
- Tooradin
- Koo Wee Rup
- Lang Lang
- Nyora
- Loch
- Korumburra
- Leongatha

== Closed lines ==
The following lines are either closed to regular passenger services, freight only, part of tourist and heritage railways, or closed and removed.

- South Western:
  - Geelong-Ballarat railway line
  - Fyansford railway line
  - Cunningham Pier railway line
  - Queenscliff railway line (Bellarine Peninsula Railway)
  - Geelong Racecourse railway line
  - Wensleydale railway line
  - Forrest railway line
  - Newtown-Colac railway line
  - Crowes railway line
  - Alvie railway line
  - Timboon railway line
  - Mortlake railway line
  - Koroit-Hamilton railway line
  - Port Fairy railway line (open as far as Warrnambool)
- Midland:
  - Geelong-Ballarat railway line (freight only)
  - Gheringhap-Maroona railway line (freight and The Overland only)
  - Mildura railway line (freight only)
- Ballarat region:
  - Waubra railway line
  - Ballarat Cattle Yards railway line
  - Buninyong railway line
  - Skipton railway line
  - Newtown-Colac railway line
- Ballarat – Serviceton:
  - Avoca railway line (freight only)
  - Navarre railway line
  - Carpolac railway line
  - Bolangum railway line
  - Patchewollock railway line (freight only to Hopetoun)
  - Yaapeet railway line (freight only)
  - Yanac railway line
- Ballarat – Mildura:
  - Avoca railway line (freight only)
  - Castlemaine-Maryborough railway line (freight only to Moolort from Maryborough)
  - Pinnaroo railway line (freight only)
  - Millewa South railway line
  - Morkalla railway line
  - Ballarat to Daylesford railway line
- Ararat – Portland:
  - Portland railway line (freight only)
  - Grampians railway line
  - Balmoral railway line
  - Koroit-Hamilton railway line
  - Coleraine railway line
  - Casterton railway line
  - Mount Gambier railway line (isolated by rail gauge)
- Northern:
- Melbourne – Bendigo:
  - Lancefield railway line
  - Daylesford railway line (Daylesford Spa Country Railway)
  - Castlemaine-Maryborough railway line
  - Maldon railway line (Victorian Goldfields Railway)
  - Redesdale railway line
  - Heathcote railway line
- West from Bendigo:
  - Robinvale railway line (freight only)
  - Wedderburn railway line
  - Eaglehawk-Inglewood railway line
  - Kulwin railway line (freight only)
  - Stony Crossing railway line
  - Yungera railway line
  - Kerang-Koondrook Tramway
- East from Bendigo:
  - Cohuna railway line
  - Toolamba-Echuca railway line (freight only)
  - Deniliquin railway line (freight only) (Passenger services provided as far as Echuca)
  - Balranald railway line (freight only to Moulamein in New South Wales)
- North Eastern:
- Melbourne – Wodonga:
  - Heathcote railway line
  - Mansfield railway line
  - Tatong railway line
  - Oaklands railway line, Victoria (freight only)
  - Whitfield railway line
  - Bright railway line
  - Yackandandah railway line
  - Peechelba East railway line
  - Wahgunyah railway line
  - Cudgewa railway line (freight only to Bandiana)
- Goulburn Valley:
  - Rushworth railway line
  - Toolamba-Echuca railway line (freight only)
  - Katamatite railway line (freight only to Dookie)
  - Picola railway line
  - Cobram railway line
  - Tocumwal railway line (freight only beyond Shepparton)
- Eastern:
- Melbourne – Orbost:
  - Orbost railway line (open as far as Bairnsdale)
  - Noojee railway line
  - Walhalla railway line (Walhalla Goldfields Railway)
  - Thorpdale railway line
  - Yallourn railway line
  - Mirboo North railway line
  - Maryvale railway line
  - Maffra railway line
  - Briagolong railway line
  - Sale Wharf railway line
  - Bairnsdale Wharf railway line
- South Gippsland:
  - Strzelecki railway line
  - Wonthaggi railway line
  - Outtrim railway line
  - Barry Beach railway line
  - Welshpool Jetty railway line
  - Woodside railway line
  - South Gippsland railway line (South Gippsland Railway)

== Closed stations ==
=== On operational lines ===
==== South West ====
Name	Line	Location	Opened	Closed	Current Status
Geelong Racecourse	Warrnambool line	Breakwater	1906	2005	Demolished
Moriac	Warrnambool line	Moriac	1877	1985	Buildings demolished. Passenger and goods platforms extant.
Pirron Yallock	Warrnambool line	Pirron Yallock	?	1985	Platform demolished, building stands
Pomborneit	Warrnambool line	Pomborneit	?	1978	Demolished
Weerite	Warrnambool line	Weerite	?	1975	Demolished
Boorcan	Warrnambool line	Boorcan	1887	1981	Goods shed extant.
Panmure	Warrnambool line	Panmure	1890	1981	Demolished
Allansford	Warrnambool line	Allansford	?	1984	Demolished

==== West ====
Name	Line	Location	Opened	Closed	Current Status
Parwan	Ballarat line	Parwan-Exford Road, Parwan	1886	1984	Demolished
Rowsley	Ballarat line	Rowsley	1889	1956	Demolished
Gordon	Ballarat line	Gordon	1879	1982	Intact, leased
Millbrook	Ballarat line	Millbrook	1885	1969	Demolished
Wallace	Ballarat line	Wallace	1885	1977	
Bungaree	Ballarat line	Bungaree	1879	1985	Platform intact
Dunnstown	Ballarat line	Dunnstown	1885	1977	Platform demolished, goods shed remains
Warrenheip	Ballarat line	Warrenheip	1873	1982	Demolished
Ballarat East	Ballarat line	Humffray Street, Ballarat East	1860s	1980s	Platform intact
Ballarat North	Ararat line	Macarthur Street, Soldiers Hill	?	?	Demolished, part of platform remains
Wendouree (original station)	Ararat line	Forest Street, Wendouree	?	1980s	Demolished
Burrumbeet	Ararat line	Burrumbeet	?	?	Platform intact
Trawalla	Ararat line	Trawalla	?	Late 1970s	Intact
Buangor	Ararat line	Buangor	?	Late 1970s	Intact, but in disrepair

==== North ====
Name	Line	Location	Opened	Closed	Current Status
Rupertswood	Bendigo line	Within Sunbury	1870s	December 2004	Intact, one platform demolished.
Carlsruhe	Bendigo line, former junction of Daylesford line	Carlsruhe Station Road, Carlsruhe	?	Destaffed 1978, closed 1982	Intact, building leased out.
Taradale	Bendigo line	Station Street, Taradale	?	1976	Intact, leased out.
Elphinstone	Bendigo line	Urquhart Street, Elphinstone	?	Late 1970s	Intact, building leased out.
Harcourt	Bendigo line	Station Street, Harcourt	?	Late 1970s	Intact, leased out
Ravenswood	Bendigo line	Ravenswood Street, Ravenswood	1863, re-opened 1882	1876, 1970	Demolished
Golden Square	Bendigo line	Coach Street, Golden Square	?	Late 1970s	Intact, building leased out.
Mitiamo	Yungera line	Mitiamo	?	Late 1970s	?
Macorna	Yungera line	Macorna	?	Late 1970s	Demolished
Lake Boga	Yungera line	Lake Boga	?	Late 1970s	Demolished

==== North East ====
Name	Line	Location	Opened	Closed	Current Status
Mangalore	Shepparton line	Mangalore	?	Early 1980s	Demolished
Tabilk	Shepparton line	Tabilk	?	Late 1980s	Demolished
Wahring	Shepparton line	Wahring	?	Late 1970s	Demolished
Arcadia	Shepparton line	Arcadia	1880	1975	Demolished
Toolamba	Shepparton line	Toolamba	13 January 1880	1987	Demolished
Longwood	Albury line	Longwood	20 November 1872	4 October 1981	Demolished
Baddaginnie	Albury line	Baddaginnie	19 June 1882	5 July 1978	Demolished, goods platform still visible
Glenrowan	Albury line	Glenrowan	2 November 1874	4 October 1981	Demolished, rebuilt 2001
Barnawartha	Albury line	Barnawartha	21 November 1873	Late 1970s	Intact

==== East ====
Name	Line	Location	Opened	Closed	Current Status
Fernbank	Bairnsdale line	Fernbank	?	Late 1970s	Demolished
Lindenow	Bairnsdale line	Lindenow	?	Late 1970s	Demolished
Hillside	Bairnsdale line	?	?	Late 1970s	Demolished

==== South East ====
Name	Line	Location	Opened	Closed	Current Status
General Motors	Bairnsdale line	Dandenong South	1956	2002	Intact

=== On closed lines ===
Name	Line	Location	Opened	Closed	Current Status
Kensington	Queenscliff line	? Leopold	1880	1881	Demolished
Queenscliff Junction	Queenscliff line	? South Geelong	1879	1901	Demolished
Geelong Showgrounds	Queenscliff line	? Breakwater	1891	?	Demolished
Scarborough	Queenscliff line	?	1889	1914	Demolished
Cheethams Siding	Queenscliff line	Whittington	1909	1959	Demolished
Moolap	Queenscliff line	Moolap Station Road, Moolap	1881	1961	Demolished
Leopold	Queenscliff line	Leopold	1881 as Kensington Flat, renamed in 1886	1961	Demolished
Curlewis	Queenscliff line	Curlewis	1914	1961	Demolished
Mannerim	Queenscliff line	Mannerim	1883, renamed from Marcus Hill station in 1890	1961	Demolished
Marcus	Queenscliff line	? Marcus	1883 as Ocean Grove station, renamed in 1896 as Marcus Hill and renamed again in 1904	1961	Demolished
Tylden	Daylesford line	?, Tylden	?	1978	Demolished
Fern Hill	Daylesford line	?	?	1978	Demolished
Woodleigh	Wonthaggi line	?	1910 as Hunter, renamed Woodleigh 30 Jun 1910	1978	Demolished
Kernot	Wonthaggi line	?	1910 as Almurta, renamed when opened to passenger and goods traffic from 9 May 1910 to McKenzie, (Victorian Railways Schedule 2204/10 May 1910) and as per Railway Commissioners approval. renamed Kernot on 1 Mar 1911	1978	Demolished
Almurta	Wonthaggi line	?	1910 as Rees, renamed as Almurta effective 1 Mar 1911 due to proximity to the Almurta Post Office	1978	Demolished
Glen Forbes	Wonthaggi line	?	1910 as Kernot, renamed Glen Forbes on 1 Mar 1911 due to proximity to the Glen Forbes Post Office	1978	Demolished
Woolamai	Wonthaggi line	?	1910	1978	Demolished
Anderson	Wonthaggi line	?	1910 as Anderson's Corner, shortened to Anderson when opened to passenger and goods traffic from 9 May 1910 (Victorian Railways Schedule 2204/10 May 1910)	1978	Demolished
Kilcunda	Wonthaggi line	?	1910	1978	Demolished
Dalyston	Wonthaggi line	?	1910	1978	Demolished
Wonthaggi	Wonthaggi line	?	1910	late 1977 – 78	Intact, station has been transformed into local museum
Clyde	South Gippsland line	Railway Rd, Clyde	1892	1994	
Tooradin	South Gippsland line	Tooradin Station Road, Tooradin	1892	1994	Demolished
Koo Wee Rup	South Gippsland line	Station Road, Koo Wee Rup	1892	1994	Demolished, Platform Intact
Monomeith	South Gippsland line	Monomeith Road, Monomeith	1892	1994	Demolished
Lang Lang	South Gippsland line	Rosebery Road, Lang Lang	1892	1994	Demolished, Platform Intact
Ruby	South Gippsland line	Ruby Road, Ruby	1892	1994	Demolished
Koonwarra	South Gippsland line	Johnsons Road Koonwarra	1892	1994	Demolished
Meeniyan	South Gippsland line	Scholers Road, Meeniyan	1892	1994	Demolished
Buffalo	South Gippsland line	Neals Road, Buffalo	1892	1994	Demolished
Fish Creek	South Gippsland line	Falls Road, Fish Creek	1892	1994	Demolished
Foster	South Gippsland line	Station Road, Foster	1892	1994	Demolished
Toora	South Gippsland line	Victoria Street, Toora	1892	1994	Demolished
Barry Beach Junction	South Gippsland line	Main Access Road (Off Barry Road) Barry Beach Junction	1892	1994	Marine Terminal Operational, Transported by Boat (No Rail), Rails Removed (Paved Over)
Welshpool	South Gippsland line	Railway Avenue, Welshpool	1892	1994	Demolished
Yeoburn	Kerang-Koondrook Tramway line	Yeoburn	1889	1981	Demolished
Hinksons	Kerang-Koondrook Tramway line	Hinksons	1889	1981	Intact, Abandoned
Teal Point	Kerang-Koondrook Tramway line	Teal Point	1889	1981	Intact, Abandoned
Gannawarra	Kerang-Koondrook Tramway line	Gannawarra	1889	1981	Intact, Abandoned
Koondrook	Kerang-Koondrook Tramway line	Koondrook	1889	1981	Intact, now a Park
Broomfield	Ballarat to Daylesford line	Broomfield	?	1986	Demolished
Allendale	Ballarat to Dalyesford line	Allendale	?	1986	Demolished, Platform Intact
Kingston	Ballarat to Dalyesford line	Kingston	?	1976	Demolished
Newlyn	Ballarat to Daylesford railway line	Newlyn	?	1953	?
Rocklyn	Ballarat to Dalyesford line	Rocklyn	?	1953	?
Wombat	Ballarat to Dalyesford line	Wombat	?	?	?
Leonard	Ballarat to Dalyesford line	Leonard	?	?	Demolished
Sailors Falls	Ballarat to Dalyesford line	Sailors Falls	?	?	Demolished
Woodburn	Ballarat to Dalyesford line	Woodburn	?	?	Platform Partially Intact

== See also ==
- List of regional railway stations in Victoria
- List of closed railway stations in Melbourne
