= Carisbrook (disambiguation) =

Carisbrook can refer to:

- Carisbrook, Victoria, a town in Victoria, Australia
  - Carisbrook stone arrangement, an Aboriginal stone arrangement near Carisbrook, Victoria
  - Carisbrook railway station, a closed railway station on the Moolort railway line, Carisbrook, Victoria
- Carisbrook, Lane Cove, a heritage-listed house and local history museum at 334 Burns Bay Road, Lane Cove, New South Wales, Australia
- Carisbrook, a former sporting venue in Dunedin, New Zealand

Carisbrooke can refer to:

- Carisbrooke, a village on the south western outskirts of Newport, Isle of Wight
  - Carisbrooke Castle a historic castle in Carisbrooke, Isle of Wight
  - Carisbrooke College, a secondary school in Carisbrooke, Isle of Wight
  - Carisbrooke railway station, a railway station situated near Carisbrooke, on the south western outskirts of Newport, Isle of Wight
