= Woodleigh station =

Woodleigh station may refer to:

- Woodleigh railway station, Victoria, Australia
- Woodleigh MRT station, Singapore

== See also ==
- Woodley station (disambiguation)
