= Carisbrook railway station =

Former railway station in Victoria, Australia

Coordinates: 37°02′34″S 143°48′34″E

Carisbrook
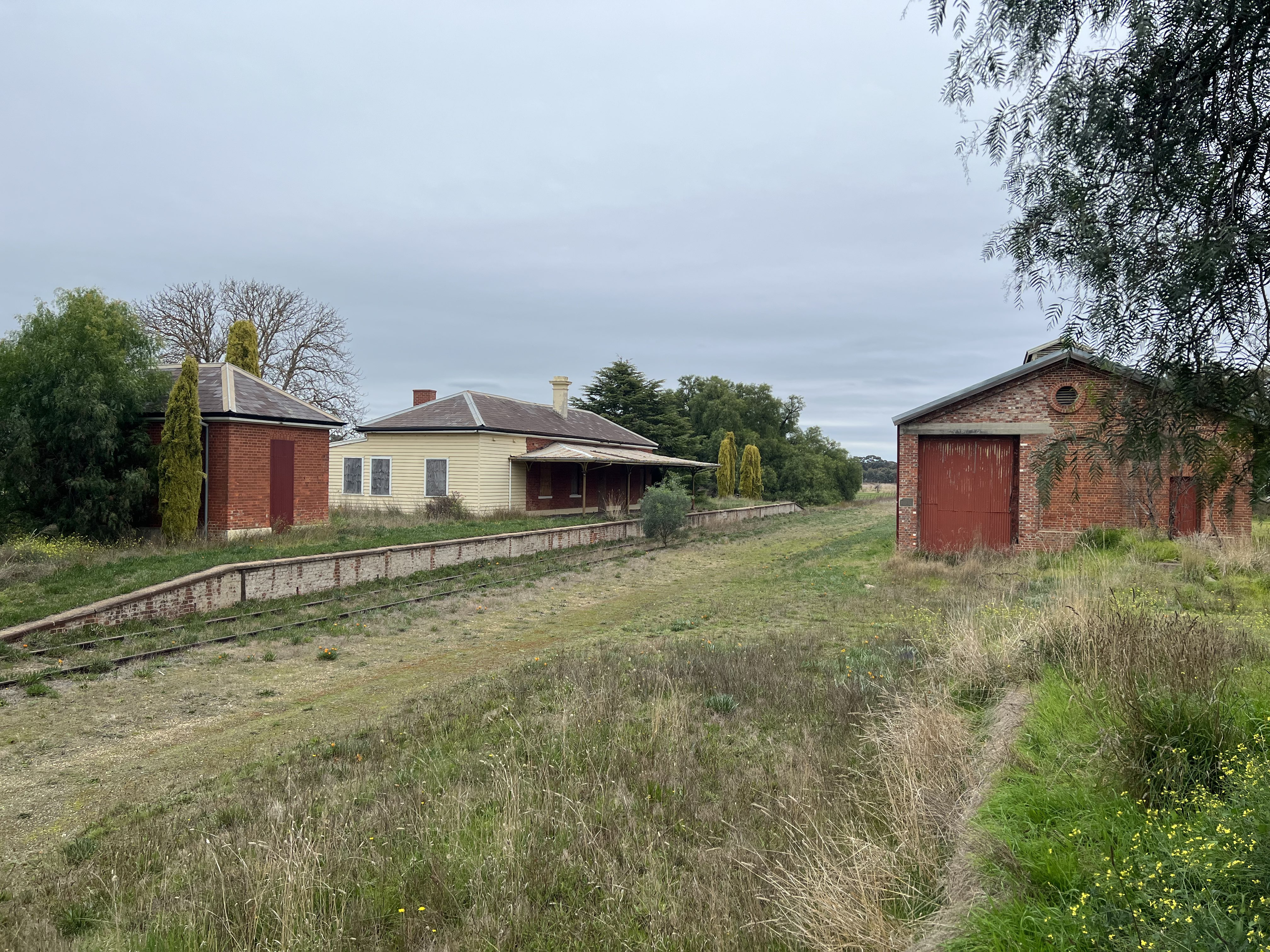
- Station and goods shed in June 2023

General information
- Location: Annesly Street South/Aston Street Carisbrook; Australia
- Owner: VicTrack
- Operator: Victorian Railways
- Line: Moolort
- Platforms: 1
- Tracks: 1

Construction
- Structure type: At-grade

Other information
- Status: Closed

History
- Opened: 7 July 1874
- Closed: 7 July 1977

Services
Preceding station	Disused railways	Following station
Moolort	Moolort line	Maryborough
	List of closed railway stations in Victoria	
Location

Carisbrook railway station is a closed railway station on the Moolort railway line at Carisbrook, Victoria. The station was opened on Tuesday, 7 July 1874.

Although no longer in use Carisbrook retains a bricks station building, platform and goods shed.

== Calls for Reopening ==
A movement for the re-opening of the railway line has been gaining momentum over the past 2 years. On Sunday 8 December 2013 a Community Rally calling for the reopening of the railway station and the railway line will take place. A discussion on the rally and the Group Rally for the return of rail services can be found on Railpage
