= Kingston railway station, Victoria =

Former railway station in Victoria, Australia

Kingston railway station

General information
- Location: Kingston, Shire of Hepburn; Victoria, Australia
- Coordinates: 37°22′31″S 143°57′47″E
- Line: Ballarat to Daylesford railway line

Other information
- Status: Closed

History
- Opened: 1887
- Closed: 1976

Services
| Preceding station | Disused railways | Following station |
|---|---|---|
| Allendale | Ballarat to Daylesford railway line | Newlyn |
| | List of closed railway stations in Victoria | |
Location

Kingston railway station was on the Ballarat to Daylesford railway line in Victoria, Australia.

In the late 1970s many of the obsolescent Tait carriages were taken from Melbourne to Kingston and disposed of by being set on fire. The line closed shortly afterwards.
