= Nilma railway station =

Former railway station in Victoria, Australia

Coordinates: 38°10′15″S 145°58′5″E

Nilma is a closed station on the Orbost railway line in the town of the same name in Victoria, Australia. It was originally named Bloomfield but was changed to Nilma in 1909, due to confusion with Broomfield railway station near Creswick, on the Ballarat to Daylesford railway line. Nilma station was closed in 1951.
