= Newstead railway station (disambiguation) =

Newstead railway station is a station in Newstead, Nottinghamshire, England

Newstead railway station may also refer to:

- Newstead railway station, Victoria, a closed station in Newstead, Victoria, Australia
- Newstead railway station (Scotland), a closed station in Newstead, Borders, Scotland
- Newstead railway station, New Zealand, a closed station in Newstead, Waikato, New Zealand
