= Beaufort railway station, Victoria =

Railway station in Victoria, Australia

Beaufort
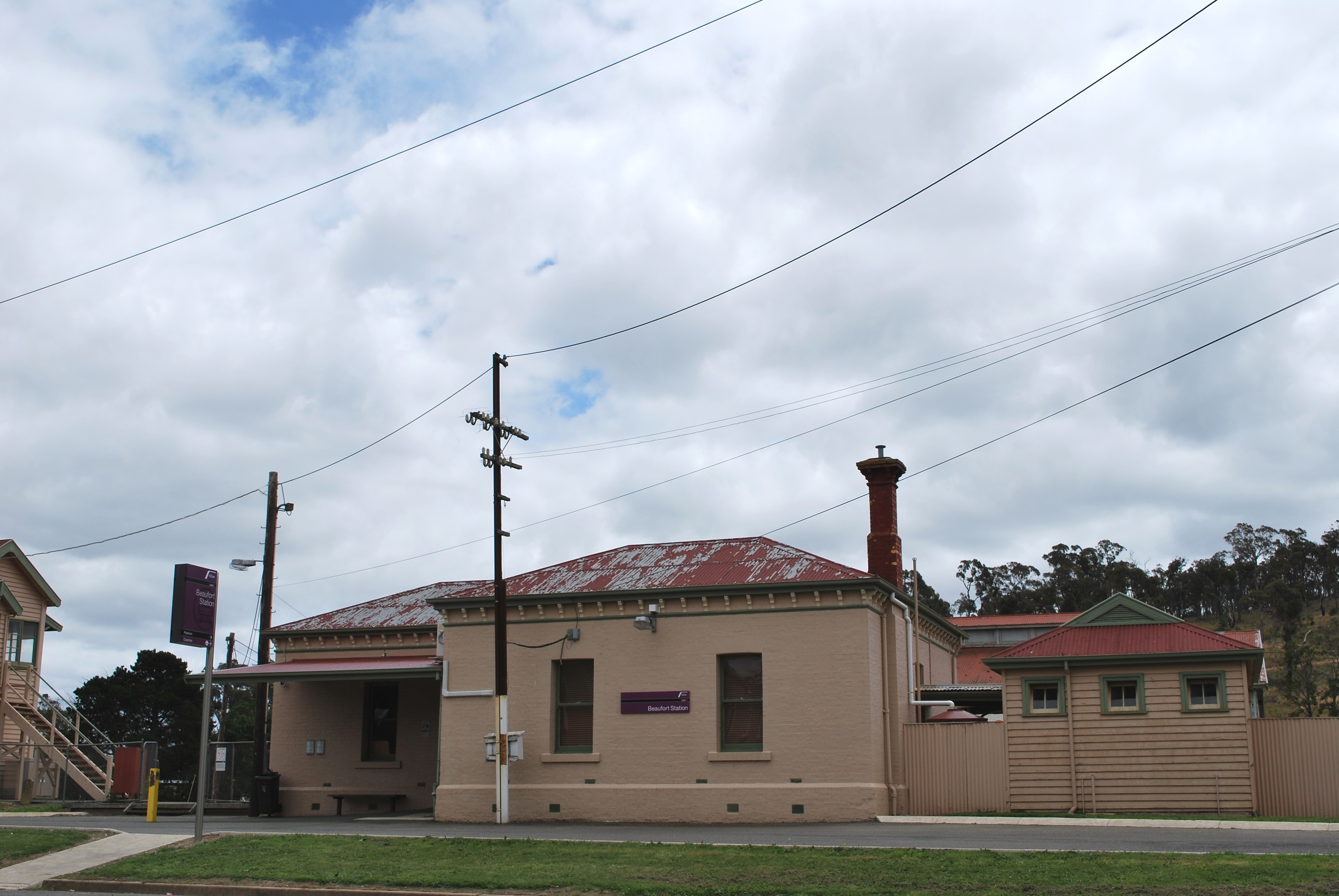
- Station building and entrance, December 2008

General information
- Location: Pratt Street, Beaufort, Victoria 3373; Shire of Pyrenees; Australia
- Coordinates: 37°25′39″S 143°22′55″E
- System: PTV regional rail station
- Owner: VicTrack
- Operator: V/Line
- Lines: Ararat (Ararat)
- Distance: 164.78 kilometres from Southern Cross
- Platforms: 1
- Tracks: 1
- Connections: Coach

Construction
- Structure type: Ground
- Parking: 19
- Accessible: Yes

Other information
- Status: Operational, unstaffed
- Station code: BET
- Fare zone: Myki zone 12
- Website: Public Transport Victoria

History
- Opened: 11 August 1874; 152 years ago
- Closed: 27 May 1994
- Rebuilt: 11 July 2004

Passengers
- 2013–2014: 8,949
- 2014–2015: 8,230 ▼8.03%
- 2015–2016: 7,989 ▼2.92%
- 2016–2017: 8,770 ▲9.77%
- 2017–2018: Not measured
- 2018–2019: 9,200 ▲4.9%
- 2019–2020: 7,300 ▼20.65%
- 2020–2021: 5,000 ▼31.5%

Services
Preceding station	V/Line	Following station
Wendouree towards Southern Cross	Ararat line	Ararat Terminus
Former services
Preceding station	Disused railways	Following station
Trawalla	Ararat line	Buangor
Location
- Location within Victoria

Beaufort railway station is a regional railway station operated by V/Line on the Ararat line, part of the Victoria rail network. It serves the town of Beaufort, in Victoria, Australia. Beaufort is a ground-level unstaffed station, featuring one side platform. The station opened on 11 August 1874, with the current station provided in 2004. It originally closed on 27 May 1994, but the station later reopened on 11 July 2004.

== History ==
Beaufort station was opened with the railway line from Ballarat. It was a terminus until 7 April 1875, when the line was extended to Ararat. Like the town itself, the station was named after Sir Francis Beaufort, a hydrographer and rear admiral of the British Royal Navy.

On 14 September 1988, it was disestablished as a staff station, with the signal box, interlocking and signals abolished. The electric staff sections Trawalla - Beaufort and Beaufort - Buangor were also abolished, replaced with the electric staff section Trawalla - Buangor. In May 1989, two loop lines that formed the station yard were removed.

In October 1993, station staff were withdrawn, and platform seats were removed. On 27 May 1994, the station closed and road coaches replaced rail passenger services between Ballarat and Ararat.

In 2000, the station building and signal box underwent a restoration, to make them more suitable for community use. By August 2003, upgrades to allow the station to reopen were complete. On 11 July 2004, the station reopened when V/Line passenger services to Ararat were reinstated. t In October 2014, the former station building was converted into a community arts centre, whilst the former goods shed hosted a steam-era museum.

Disused stations at Burrumbeet and Trawalla are located between Beaufort and Wendouree, and the disused station Buangor is located between Beaufort and Ararat.

== Platforms and services ==
Beaufort has one platform and is served by V/Line Ararat line trains.

Beaufort platform arrangement
Platform	Line	Destination
1	Ararat line	Southern Cross, Ararat

== Transport links ==
V/Line operates a road coach service via Beaufort station:

- Ballarat – Adelaide via Ararat, Stawell, Horsham and Dimboola
