= Newstead railway station, Victoria =

Former railway station in Victoria, Australia

Coordinates: 37°06′45″S 144°03′21″E

Newstead
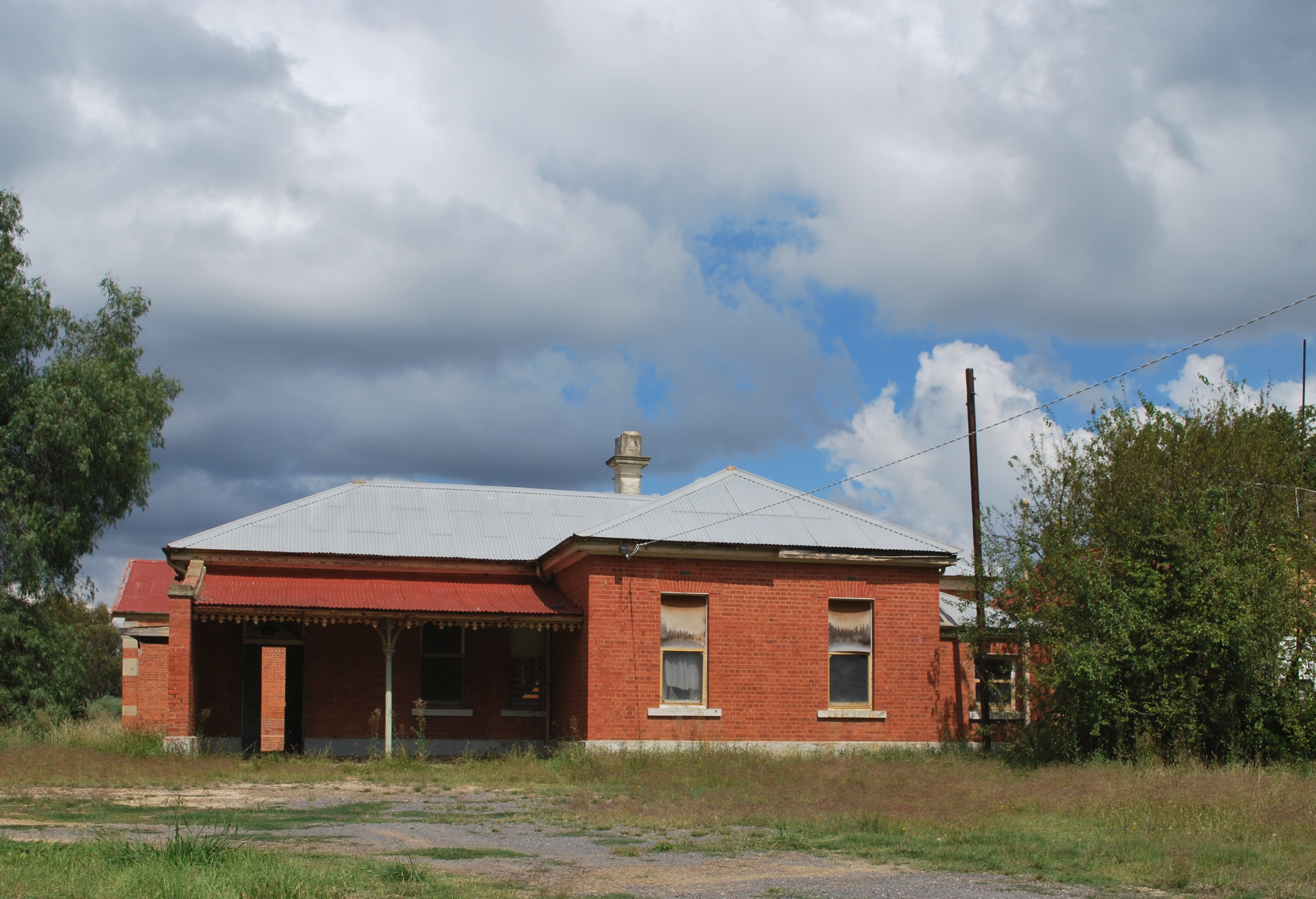

General information
- Line: Moolort
- Platforms: 1
- Tracks: 1

Construction
- Structure type: At-grade

Other information
- Status: Closed

History
- Opened: 7 July 1874
- Closed: 7 July 1977

Services
Preceding station	Disused railways	Following station
Strangway	Moolort line	Moolort
	List of closed railway stations in Victoria	
Location

Newstead Station was opened on Tuesday, 7 July 1874. Although no longer in use, Newstead retains a bricks station building, booking office, platform and goods shed. On Friday 17 December 2004, the line from Moolort to Maldon junction was closed, due to the line being reserved for the Victorian Goldfields Railway to operate between Maldon and Castlemaine.
