= Rocklyn railway station =

Railway station in Victoria, Australia

General information
- Location: Rocklyn, Shire of Hepburn; Victoria, Australia
- Coordinates: 37°25′27″S 144°02′34″E
- Line: Ballarat to Daylesford railway line

Other information
- Status: Closed

History
- Opened: 1887
- Closed: 1953

Services
Preceding station	Disused railways	Following station
Newlyn	Ballarat to Daylesford railway line	Wombat
	List of closed railway stations in Victoria	
Location

Rocklyn railway station was on the Ballarat to Daylesford railway line in Victoria, Australia.

On Boxing Day in 1914, the station was the scene of a "sensational shooting incident", in which a group of three young men, who had been shooting at a church bell and grown bored of the target, opened fire on a passing train and very nearly killed the guard.
