= Moolort railway station =

Former railway station in Victoria, Australia

Coordinates: 37°03′14″S 143°55′01″E

Moolort

General information
- Line: Moolort
- Platforms: 1
- Tracks: 3

Other information
- Status: Closed

History
- Opened: 1874

Services
Preceding station	Disused railways	Following station
Newstead	Moolort line	Carisbrook
	List of closed railway stations in Victoria	
Location

Moolort station was opened on 7 July 1874. There is no longer a station platform at Moolort (it was shortened from 61.5m to 18.3m in length in 1973). However, there are still sidings provided to grain silos and to ballast piles. On 17 December 2004, the line from Moolort to Maldon Junction was closed, due to the line being reserved for the Victorian Goldfields Railway to operate between Maldon and Castlemaine. Ballast trains operate from Maryborough to Moolort.
