= North Creswick railway station =

Former railway station in Victoria, Australia

General information
- Location: Victoria, Australia
- Coordinates: 37°24′19″S 143°53′02″E
- Lines: Ballarat to Daylesford railway line; Mildura railway line

Other information
- Status: Closed

History
- Opened: 1887
- Closed: 1985

Services
Preceding station	Disused railways	Following station
Creswick towards Ballarat	Ballarat to Daylesford railway line	Broomfield towards Daylesford
Creswick towards Southern Cross	Mildura railway line	Tourello towards Mildura
	List of closed railway stations in Victoria	
Location

North Creswick railway station was a small junction station on the Mildura railway line where the Ballarat to Daylesford railway line branched to the northeast. Nothing remains of the station. It was 176.407 km from the start of the main line.

When the junction opened in 1887, it provided an alternate route to Melbourne, via Daylesford. The station originally had passenger facilities, but as the Daylesford line declined in importance, the passenger and junction facilities gradually declined. The through route on the line was closed from 1952, and the branch line closed completely in 1985. The station is no longer used.
