= Trawalla railway station =

Former railway station in Victoria, Australia

Trawalla
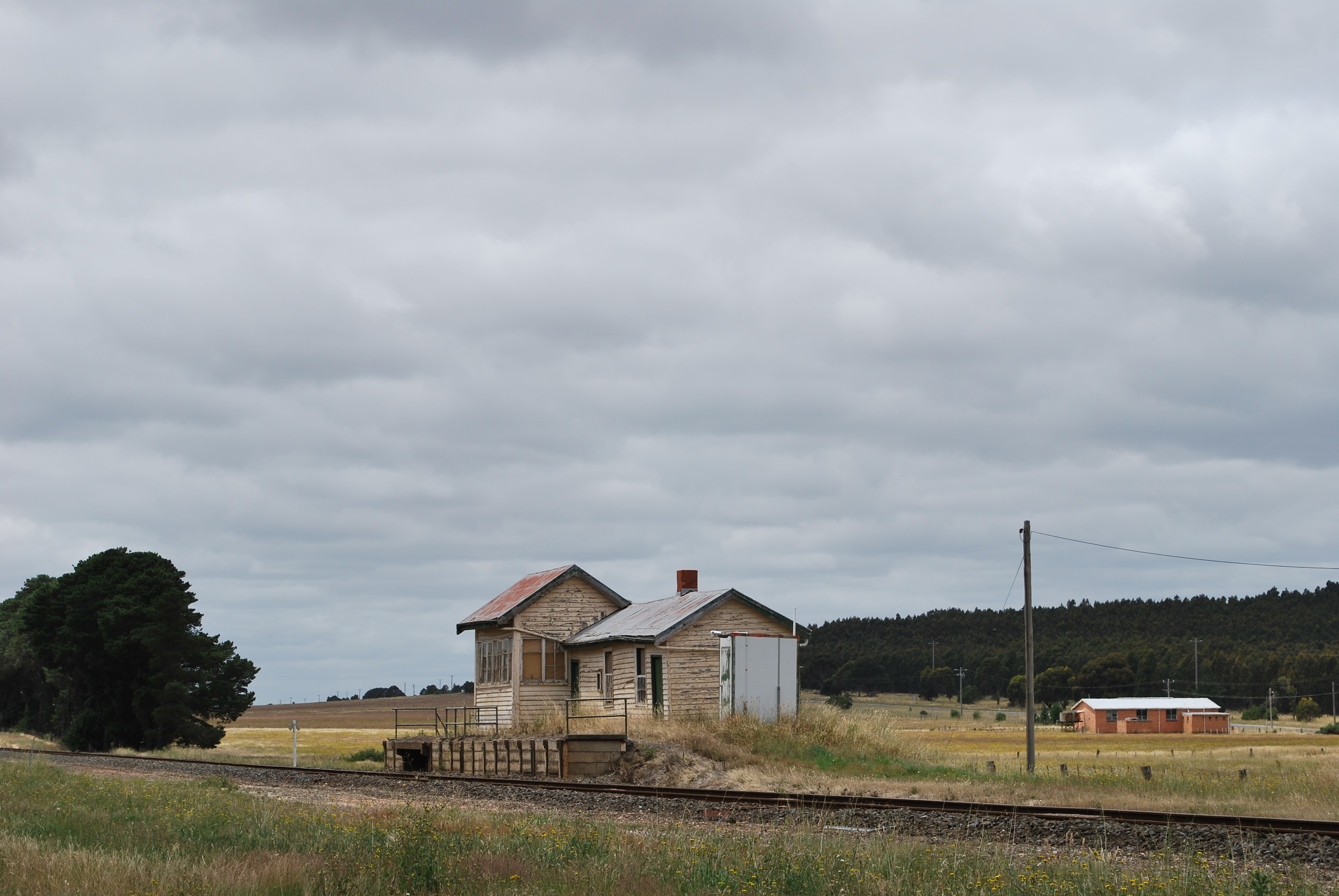
- The closed station building

General information
- Coordinates: 37°26′07″S 143°28′13″E
- Line: Ararat
- Platforms: 1
- Tracks: 1

Other information
- Status: Closed

History
- Opened: 1874
- Closed: 4 October 1981

Services
Preceding station	V/Line	Following station
Burrumbeet towards Southern Cross	Ararat line	Beaufort towards Ararat
List of closed railway stations in Victoria
Location

Trawalla is a closed station located in the town of Trawalla, on the Ararat railway line in Victoria, Australia. A disused goods yard is located at the station. The station was one of 35 closed to passenger traffic on 4 October 1981 as part of the New Deal timetable for country passengers. Until the 1980s Trawalla was still used as a staff exchange point to either Ballarat or Beaufort. The line through Trawalla closed in 1995 after all traffic was diverted via Cressy but was reopened in 2004 as part of the Linking Victoria program. The station building still remains and is visible from the Western Highway and from inside the train.
