= Glen Forbes railway station =

Former railway station in Victoria, Australia

Coordinates: 38°27′33″S 145°32′35″E

Glen Forbes

General information
- Line: Wonthaggi
- Platforms: 1
- Tracks: 1

Other information
- Status: Closed

History
- Opened: 1910
- Closed: Early 1970s
- Former names: Kernot

Services
Preceding station	Disused railways	Following station
Almurta	Wonthaggi line	Woolamai
	List of closed railway stations in Victoria	
Location

Glen Forbes was a railway station on the Wonthaggi railway line, located on the Bass Coast, Victoria, Australia. The station opened with the line in 1910 and was originally called "Kernot". The name was changed to Glen Forbes in 1915. The station operated until the early 1970s, shortly before the closure of the Wonthaggi line.

The platform mound of the station and a nearby trestle bridge are the only remains of the railway.
