= Kerang railway station =

Railway station in Victoria, Australia

Kerang
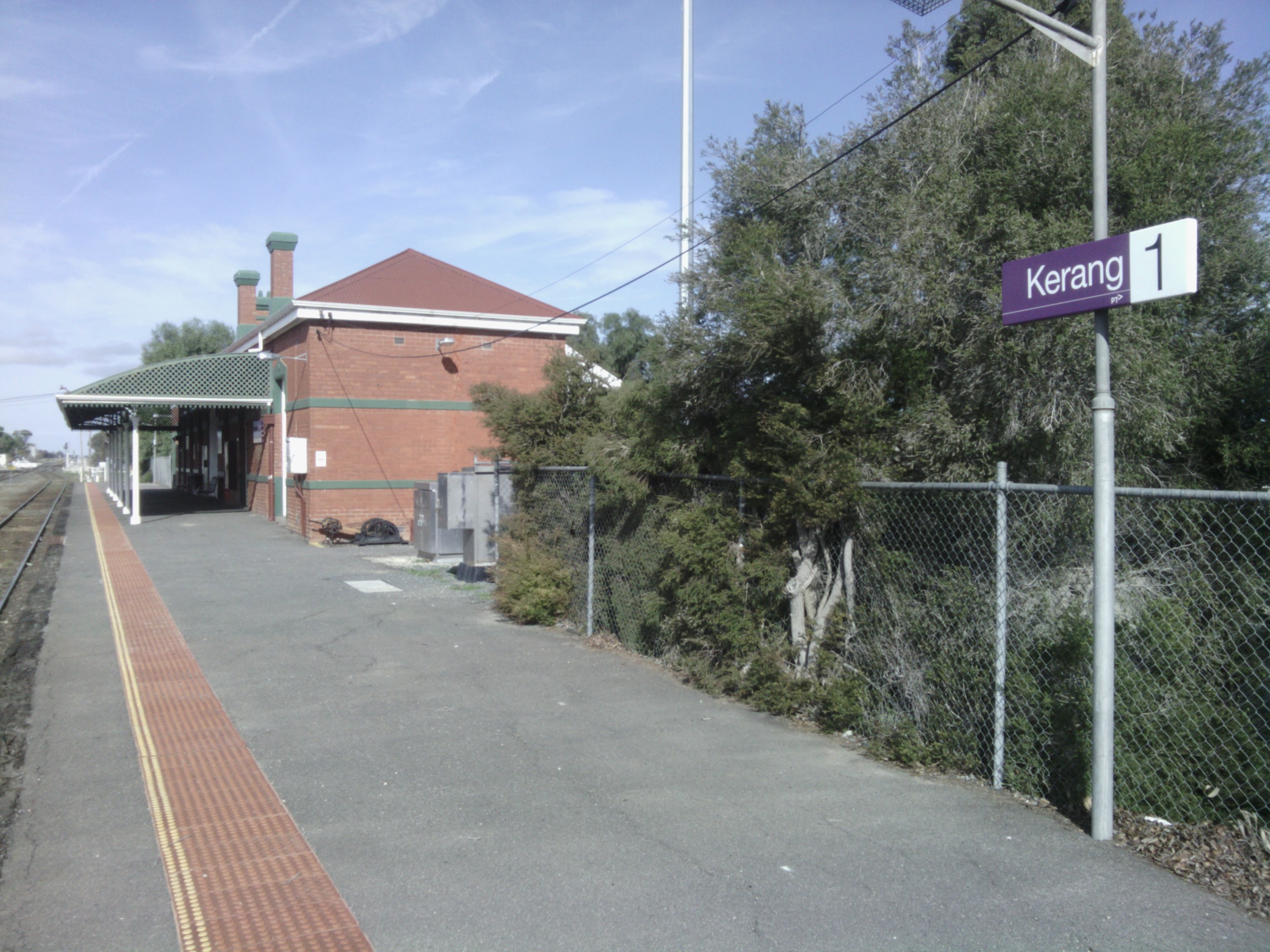
- Southbound view from platform in June 2015

General information
- Location: Boundary Street, Kerang, Victoria 3579; Shire of Gannawarra; Australia
- Coordinates: 35°43′59″S 143°55′27″E
- System: PTV regional rail station
- Owner: VicTrack
- Operator: V/Line
- Line: Swan Hill (Piangil)
- Distance: 288.89 kilometres from Southern Cross
- Platforms: 1
- Tracks: 4
- Connections: Coach

Construction
- Structure type: At-grade
- Parking: 10 spaces
- Accessible: Yes

Other information
- Status: Operational, unstaffed
- Station code: KER
- Fare zone: Myki zone 29
- Website: Public Transport Victoria

History
- Opened: 25 October 1884; 141 years ago

Services
Two daily services in both directions
Preceding station	V/Line	Following station
Pyramid towards Southern Cross	Swan Hill line	Swan Hill Terminus
Former service
Preceding station	Disused railways	Following station
Macorna	Piangil line	Lake Boga
Location
- Location within Victoria

Kerang railway station is located on the Piangil line in Victoria, Australia. It serves the town of Kerang, and it opened on 25 October 1884.

== History ==
Kerang opened on 25 October 1884. On 30 May 1890, the line was extended to Swan Hill. The station, like the township itself, was named after an Aboriginal word meaning moon or an edible root vegetable.

Kerang was once the junction station of the former railway lines to Stony Crossing and Koondrook, both closing in 1961 and 1976 respectively.

A number of sidings opposite the station were removed in 1991.

In late 1993 and 1994, the station was operated by the former Borough of Kerang through a lease agreement with the Public Transport Corporation, after the station was de-staffed in August 1993. The borough assumed control of the station on 13 December 1993, however withdrew from the agreement on 30 June 1994, due to low ticket sales and operation costs.

The station platform was reconstructed and resurfaced in January 2019.

Disused station Macorna is located between Kerang and Pyramid, while demolished station Lake Boga was located between Kerang and Swan Hill.

=== Kerang train crash ===
On 5 June 2007, a fatal crash occurred between a train and a semi-trailer at the Murray Valley Highway level crossing, north of Kerang. Eleven people died, all of whom were passengers.

== Platforms and services ==
Kerang has one platform. It is serviced by twice daily V/Line Swan Hill line services to Southern Cross and Swan Hill.

Kerang platform arrangement
Platform	Line	Destination	Via	Source
1	Swan Hill line	Southern Cross, Swan Hill	Bendigo	

== Transport links ==
V/Line operates a road coach service between Bendigo and Swan Hill/Mildura via Kerang station.
