= Casterton railway station =

Former railway station in Victoria, Australia

Coordinates: 37°35′15″S 141°24′14″E

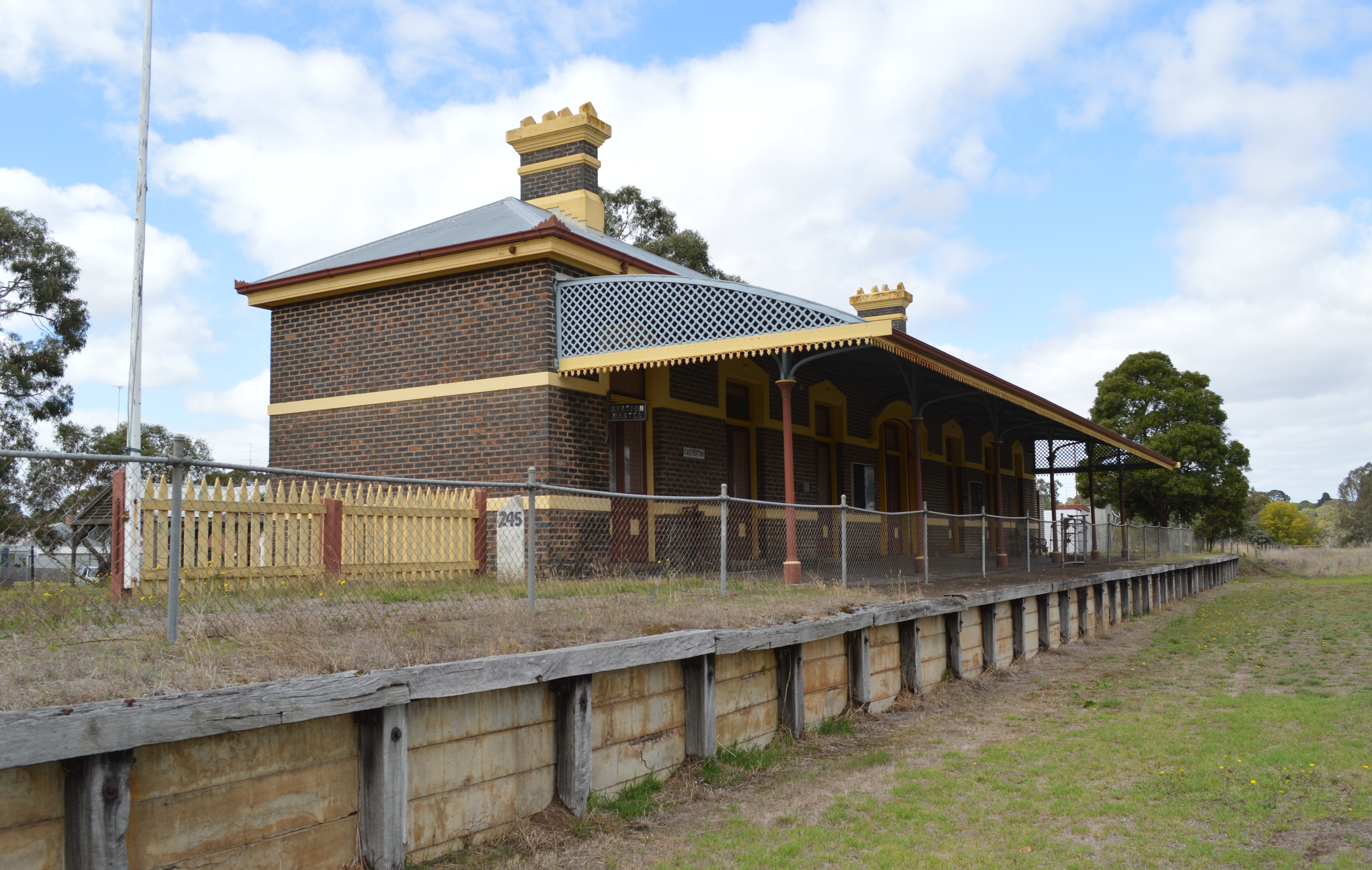
Casterton railway station

Casterton railway station was a railway station on the Casterton railway line in Victoria, Australia. The station was built by A. C. Findley, and opened in 1886. A mixed Passenger–goods train continued to operate on the Casterton Line until 1949 when the passenger service was withdrawn. On 15 March 1954, a rail–car service between Branxholme and Casterton was started on a basis of seeing whether it would be profitable or not. This service was cancelled on 31 July 1954. However, the station was never demolished, and following a period of restoration, now operates as a tourist attraction.
