= Kernot railway station =

Former railway station in Victoria, Australia

Coordinates: 38°25′38.59″S 145°35′43.11″E

Kernot
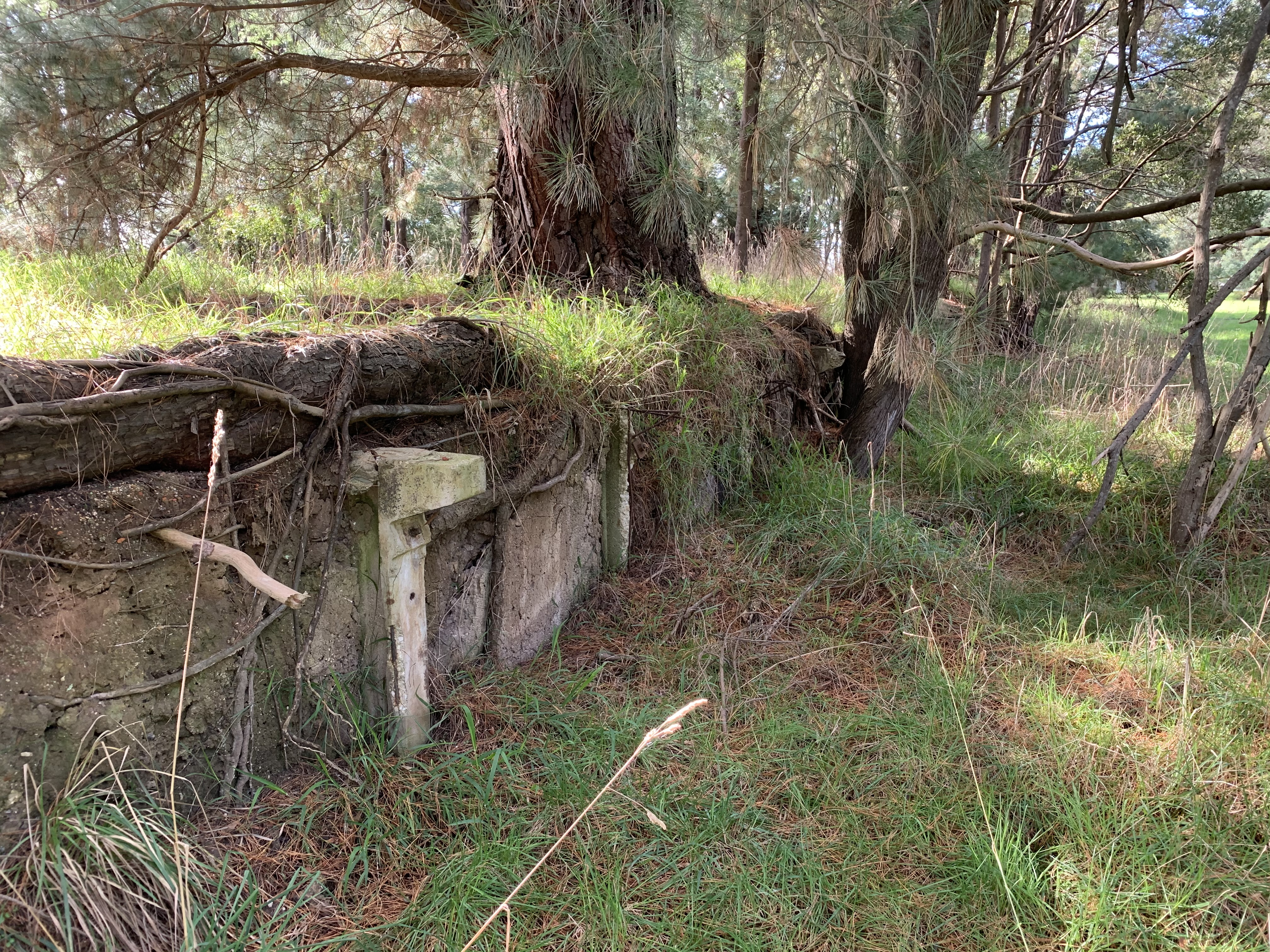
- Kernot Railway Station (2020)

General information
- Line: Wonthaggi
- Platforms: 1
- Tracks: 2 (Main Line and Passing Siding)

Other information
- Status: Closed

History
- Opened: 1910
- Closed: 1978
- Former names: Almurta, McKenzie

Services
Preceding station	Disused railways	Following station
Woodleigh	Wonthaggi line	Almurta
	List of closed railway stations in Victoria	
Location

Kernot was a railway station in Victoria, Australia, built on the Wonthaggi railway line. Not long after the line opened the station was equipped with a 10,000-gallon tank and crane, and was located within walking distance of the Kernot General Store which closed at the same time as the line did in 1978.

== History ==
Following trial surveys of the route conducted in 1901, the new line was built from Loch, Victoria, to serve various farms in the district. The station was built by the Nyora and Woolamai Construction Trust in 1909 and was located in the Bass Coast Shire, Victoria.

An extension to Woolamai was included in the early proposal because it could connect with the San Remo and Kilcunda Tramway, and the Kernot station was enhanced with a 10,000-gallon tank and crane after the line opened. By 1915, the station saw more traffic than any other one between Daylston and Nyora, leading to proposals for the construction of a 15-room hotel opposite the store.

The station site was surveyed and acquired without objection under the Railway Lands Acquisition Act of 1893 and by the authority of the Nyora and Woolamai Railway Construction Act, 1907, with the proviso that the line run inland from Nyora and not along the coast from Lang Lang. Later, many proponents of the inland line felt somewhat deceived when the proposed route acquired so much of their fertile land (up to 50 yards (46 m) on either side of the line) and did not pass within 1 mile (1.6 km) of Almurta township due to the unfavourable gradients.

Petitions were submitted to state parliament and requests made to the shire engineer, asking for an independent survey of the route and that the line be routed through the hills, where the land was worth only £5 per acre, rather than via the flatlands where land was worth up to £40 per acre. The use of the flatlands route contributed to the line's retention five years after its opening (see Woodleigh railway station).

Kernot station was called Almurta (Victorian Railways Schedule 1639/10 in Feb 1910) when it served the coal line, but was temporarily renamed McKenzie (Victorian Railways Schedule 2204/10 May 1910) when it opened for passenger and goods services on the Wonthaggi line on 9 May 1910. McKenzie was the surname of an officer of the Mines Department who had been prominently identified with the Powlett Coalfield. Passenger services lasted only a few years, with Railway Commissioners stating that the service was losing £900 per year due to poor patronage.

In 1911, the station was finally named Kernot by the Railway Commissioners because the original Kernot Station had been named after the chief engineer of the Victorian Railways. It also honoured the engineer's recently deceased brother, Professor William Charles Kernot. With the naming of Kernot, the four stations on the line had their final names: Hunter became Woodleigh, McKenzie became Kernot, Rees became Almurta, and the original Kernot became Glen Forbes.

Shortly after opening, an accident occurred at Kernot when a goods train from Nyora crashed into a coal train waiting at the siding at the station. Both engines were derailed and severely damaged, although the crews escaped injury. Rescue teams worked throughout the night and into the next day to clear the debris.

Kernot station closed in 1978, at the same time as the line. The retaining wall of the platform and the level crossing on the nearby main road are still visible. The Kernot station site is in Crown Allotment 2058 in the parish of Corinella and is allocated for future use as a reserve, and part of a possible Nyora-Wonthaggi Rail Trail.
