= Almurta railway station =

Former railway station in Victoria, Australia

Coordinates: 38°26′24″S 145°33′59″E

Almurta

General information
- Line: Wonthaggi
- Platforms: 1
- Tracks: 1

Other information
- Status: Closed

History
- Opened: 1910
- Closed: 1978
- Former names: Rees

Services
Preceding station	Disused railways	Following station
Kernot	Wonthaggi line	Glen Forbes
	List of closed railway stations in Victoria	
Location

Almurta was a railway station on the Wonthaggi railway line, located on the Bass Coast in Victoria. It operated from the opening of the Wonthaggi line in 1910, until the line closed in 1978. It was originally announced that the station would be called "Rees", but that name never seems to have been applied.

The retaining wall of the former platform is in poor condition, but a nearby trestle bridge is still intact.
