= Kardella railway station =

Former railway station in Victoria, Australia

Coordinates: 38.4277°S 145.8687°E

Kardella

General information
- Line: South Gippsland
- Platforms: 1
- Tracks: 1

Other information
- Status: Closed

History
- Opened: 17 November 1891; 134 years ago
- Closed: 30 April 1976; 50 years ago

Services
Preceding station	VicRail	Following station
Korumburra towards Spencer Street	South Gippsland line	Ruby towards Yarram
Location

Kardella was a railway station on the South Gippsland railway line in South Gippsland, Victoria. Kardella is an Aboriginal word thought to mean possum, and was chosen by the Victorian Railways from several submissions. The station was opened in December 1891 and operated until 30 April 1976.

The station building, platform, sidings, goods storage shed, and all other rail infrastructure, were removed from the station site within months of its closure. By 1980, there was no evidence of the existence of a railway station there, apart from a gravel road alongside the rail line, near a former level crossing.
