= Elphinstone railway station =

Former railway station in Victoria, Australia

Coordinates: 37°06′10″S 144°20′00″E

Elphinstone
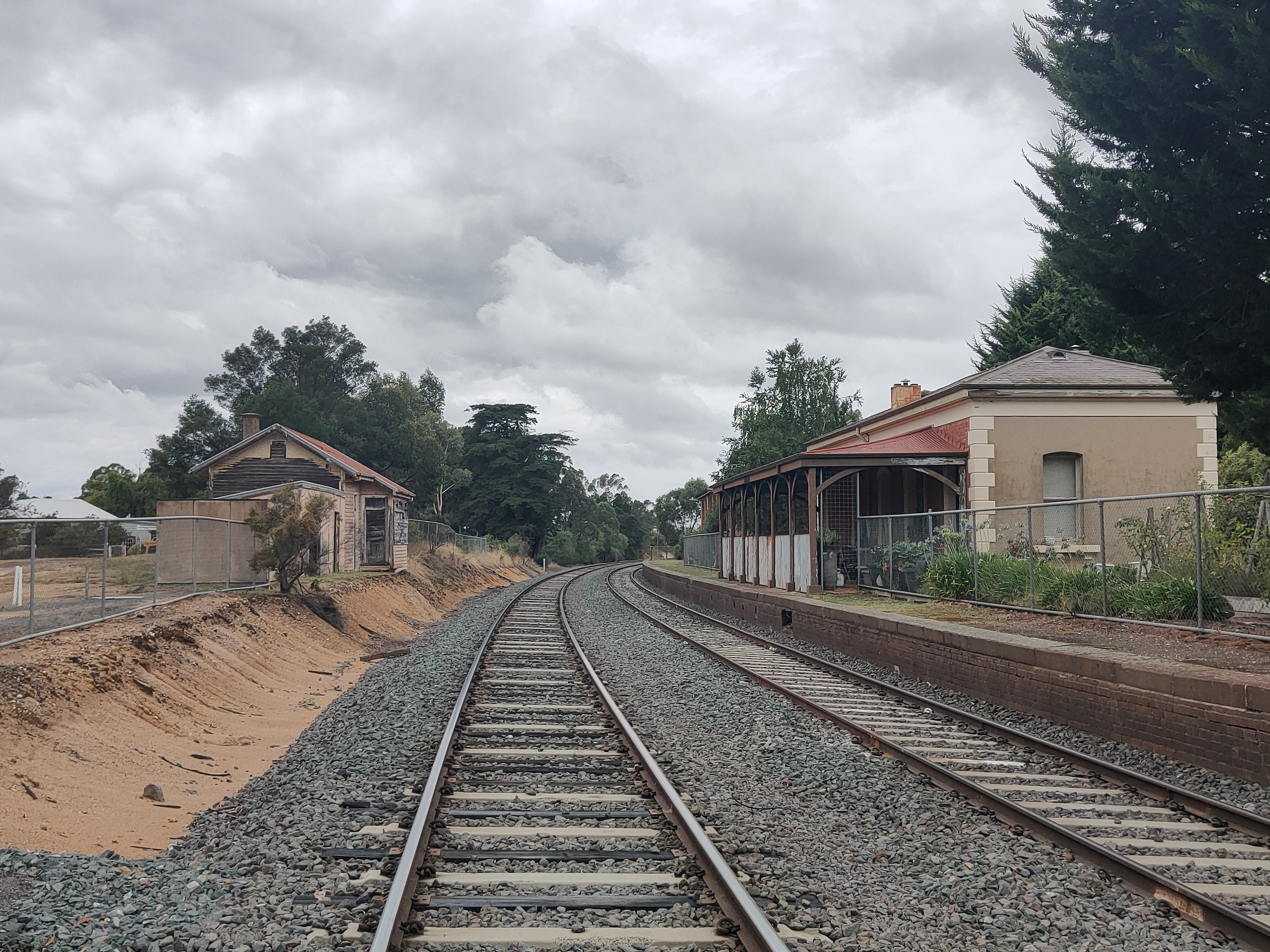
- Elphinstone railway station, 2022

General information
- Line: Bendigo
- Platforms: 2
- Tracks: 2

Other information
- Status: Closed

History
- Opened: 21 October 1862
- Closed: 4 October 1981

Services
Preceding station	V/Line	Following station
Taradale towards Southern Cross	Bendigo line	Chewton towards Bendigo
List of closed railway stations in Victoria
Location

Elphinstone railway station was located on the Bendigo line, serving the Victorian town of the same name. The station opened in October 1862, and was closed to passenger traffic on 4 October 1981, as part of the New Deal timetable for country passengers.

The Elphinstone station building is listed by the National Trust, and there are only two other similar ones in Victoria. It is a single-storey brick building with a hipped roof, quoining, and rendered window dressings with stone sills. A goods shed, with polychrome brickwork and granite trimmings, is situated at the Melbourne end of the main platform. It is equipped with a hand-operated crane dating back to the opening of the line. The station building is now leased as a private residence.

In 1988, all points and signals, and the interlocked signal frame, were abolished. The double line block sections, Kyneton to Elphinstone and Elphinstone to Castlemaine "A" signal box, were abolished, and replaced with a double line block section, Kyneton to Castlemaine "A" box.
