= Lake Boga railway station =

Former railway station in Victoria, Australia

Coordinates: 35°27′39″S 143°37′55″E

Lake Boga
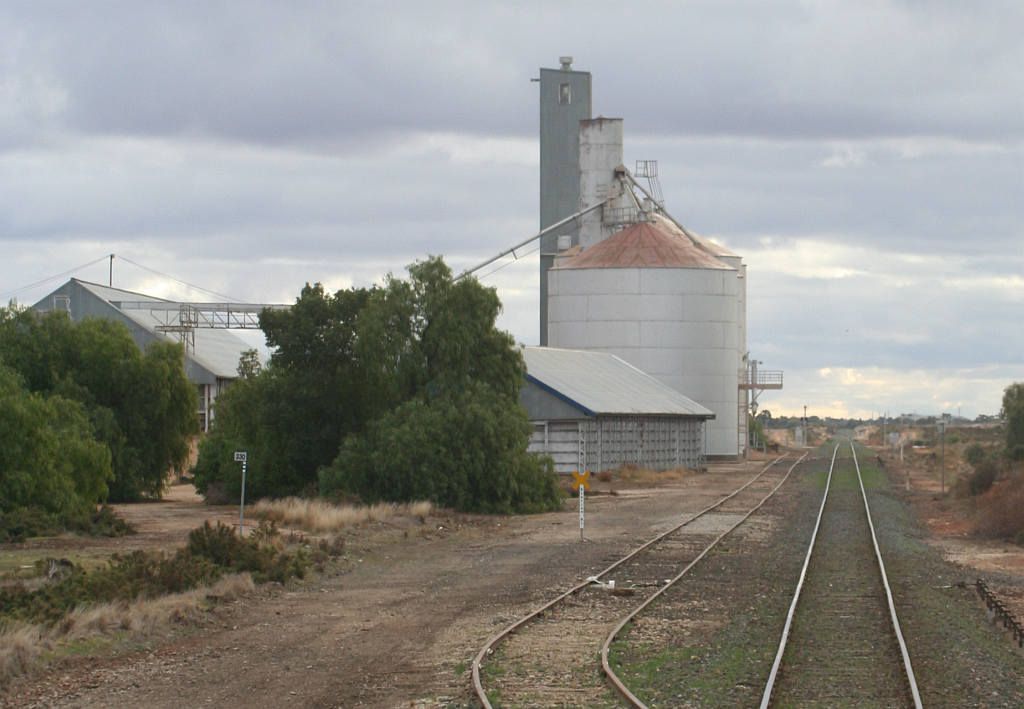
- Silos and siding at Lake Boga looking towards Swan Hill

General information
- Line: Yungera
- Platforms: 1
- Tracks: 2

Other information
- Status: Closed

History
- Closed: 4 October 1981

Services
| Preceding station | Disused railways | Following station |
|---|---|---|
| Kerang | Yungera line | Swan Hill |
| | List of closed railway stations in Victoria | |
Location

Lake Boga railway station was located on the Yungera line. It served the Victoria town of Lake Boga. The station closed to passenger traffic on 4 October 1981 as part of the New Deal timetable for country passengers. A siding and a number of grain silos remain at the site.
