= Buangor railway station =

Former railway station in Victoria, Australia

Coordinates: 37°22′05″S 143°10′10″E

Buangor

General information
- Line: Ararat
- Platforms: 1
- Tracks: 1

Other information
- Status: Closed

History
- Closed: 4 October 1981

Services
| Preceding station | V/Line | Following station |
|---|---|---|
| Beaufort towards Southern Cross | Ararat line | Ararat Terminus |
List of closed railway stations in Victoria
Location

Buangor is a closed station in the town of Buangor, on the Ararat railway line in Victoria, Australia. It was opened on 7 April 1875 when the line was extended from Beaufort to Ararat.

The station was one of 35 Victorian country stations closed to passenger traffic on 4 October 1981, as part of the New Deal timetable for country passengers. The line to Ararat was closed in April 1995 and was reopened in July 2004, but Buangor station was not reinstated.
