= Woolamai railway station =

Former railway station in Victoria, Australia

Woolamai

General information
- Coordinates: 38°30′4″S 145°30′7″E
- Line: Wonthaggi
- Platforms: 1
- Tracks: 1

Other information
- Status: Closed

History
- Opened: 1910
- Closed: 1978

Services
Preceding station	Disused railways	Following station
Glen Forbes	Wonthaggi line	Anderson
	List of closed railway stations in Victoria	
Location

Woolamai was a railway station on the Wonthaggi line located on the Bass Coast, Victoria. The station opened with the line in 1910 and operated until the line's closure in 1978. The platform mound and a nearby level crossing are the only remains of the railway in this area.
