= Macorna railway station =

Former railway station in Victoria, Australia

Coordinates: 35°55′18″S 144°01′47″E

Macorna

General information
- Line: Yungera
- Platforms: 1
- Tracks: 1

Other information
- Status: Closed

History
- Closed: 4 October 1981

Services
Preceding station	Disused railways	Following station
Pyramid	Yungera line	Kerang
	List of closed railway stations in Victoria	
Location

Macorna railway station was located on the Yungera line. It served the Victoria town of Macorna. The station closed to passenger traffic on 4 October 1981 as part of the New Deal timetable for country passengers.
