= Nowingi =

Locality in Victoria, Australia

Coordinates: 34°36′S 142°14′E

Nowingi is a locality in Victoria, Australia, approximately 50 kilometres (31 mi) south of Mildura. 48.8 m above sea level, it is in the local government area of the Rural City of Mildura. The nearest town is Red Cliffs, about 32 km away.

The Nowingi State Forest has the only known Victorian population of the nationally threatened south-eastern long-eared bat.

== Railway ==
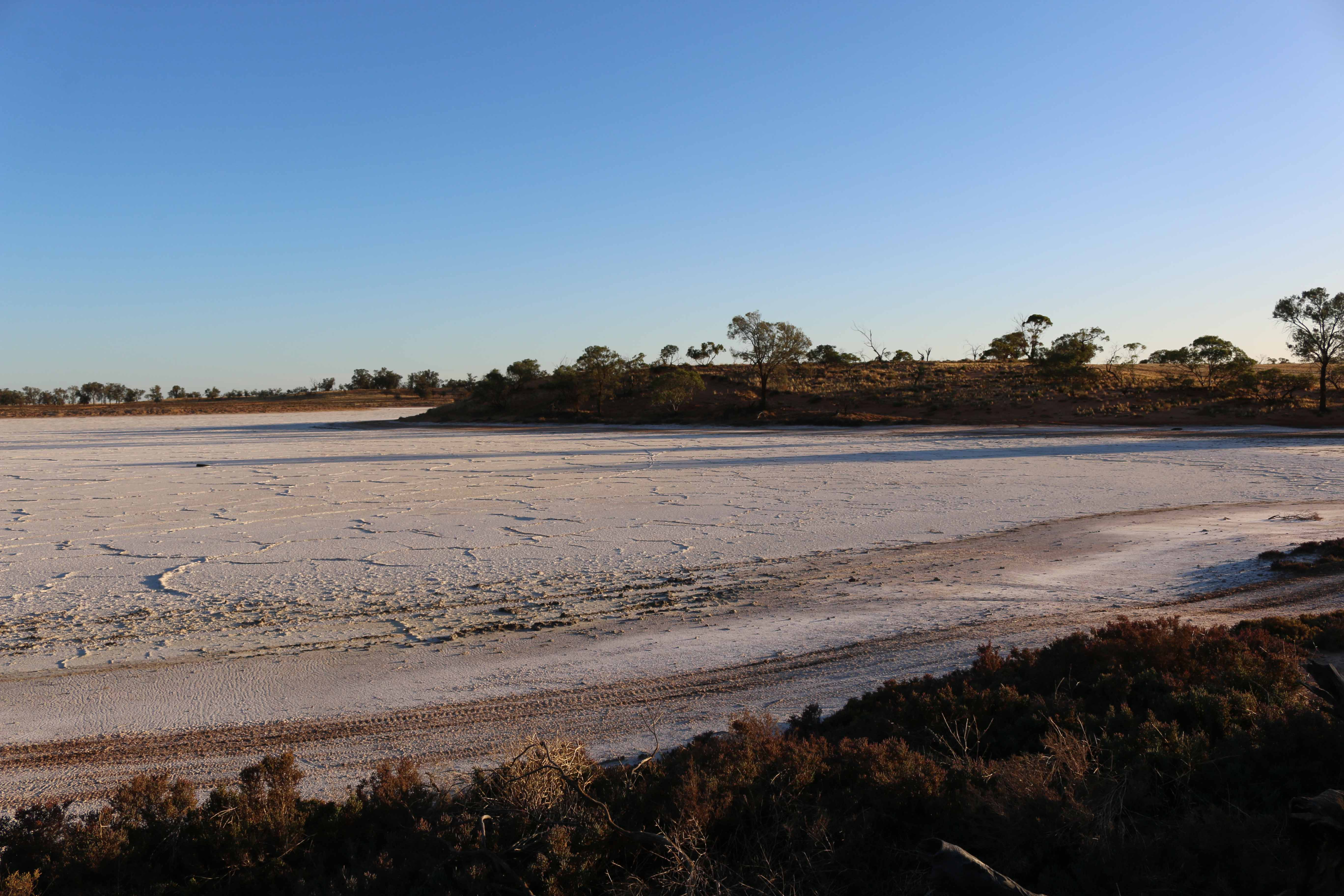
Salt pan, Nowingi, 2021

Nowingi was where the Millewa South railway line branched off from the Mildura line. The branch line, constructed in the late 1920s, was designed to open up the area for wheat farming but was never completed. It was only used to transport gypsum, mined from adjacent salt pans. The lease of the line to Brunswick Plaster Mills was terminated in January 1988 and the tracks were dismantled later that year.

== Proposed toxic waste facility ==
In May 2004, unreserved Crown land about five kilometres south of Nowingi was declared as the state government's preferred site for a long-term hazardous industrial waste containment facility.

The site was a small enclave of state forest surrounded by national park. It contained habitat important to a number of threatened species. Its hydrological features were disputed. The Environmental Effects Statement (EES), as well as subsequent evidence, predicted that contaminated moisture would take more than 1000 years to move though the proposed barrier system. Modelling of the movement of groundwater contaminants predicted that, if they did enter the groundwater, they would move slowly through the Blanchetown Clay and then in a westerly to north-westerly direction towards the Raak Plains, taking thousands of years to finally discharge within the Raak Boinkas in the Murray-Sunset National Park. However, local opponents claimed the water would flow east through Hattah-Kulkyne National Park into the Murray River.

The local opponents formed the "Save the Food Bowl Alliance" and branded the facility the "Mallee Toxic Waste Dump". The opponents noted that the site was around 500 km away from Melbourne, where most of the waste would be generated. They argued that transporting the waste would be more costly, and involve a greater risk of accidents, than if the site was closer to Melbourne. The chairman of the "Save the Food Bowl Alliance", National Party member Peter Crisp, was elected to Victorian Parliament in at the 2006 state election.

A state government planning panel report, released in December 2006, found the proposal to be environmentally feasible, but recommended against granting approval on strategic planning grounds because the facility:

- Could fill too soon to provide a sustainable solution for Victoria's Category B wastes;
- Cannot be reasonably or readily expanded because of its surrounds;
- Would be between two National Parks;
- Would be located in high conservation value remnant vegetation which is habitat of threatened species;
- Would be too distant from waste producers, and
- Would, as a lesser but relevant consideration, be constrained by the need to suspend construction during the breeding period of mallee emu-wren and malleefowl.

In January 2007, the Victorian Government announced that it was abandoning the proposal to build the Nowingi facility. The announcement was welcomed by opponents, not only in the Mildura area and elsewhere in Victoria, but also across the border in South Australia, where there were fears that, in reputation, if not in reality, toxic waste could contaminate the Murray River and thereby threaten the fruit-growing industries in the Riverland and Murraylands.

The Rural City of Mildura and residents spent almost $2 million fighting the proposal. The Victorian Government did not rule out some form of reimbursement for the costs incurred by the city council in opposing the LTCF. Acting premier, John Thwaites, noted: "The general rule is that people bear their own costs, that is most likely to apply in this case ... but I've indicated and I am prepared to talk to the council and mayor about the whole issue of how Mildura moves forward and I'll do that,"
