= Taradale railway station =

Former railway station in Victoria, Australia

Coordinates: 37°08′01″S 144°21′22″E

Taradale
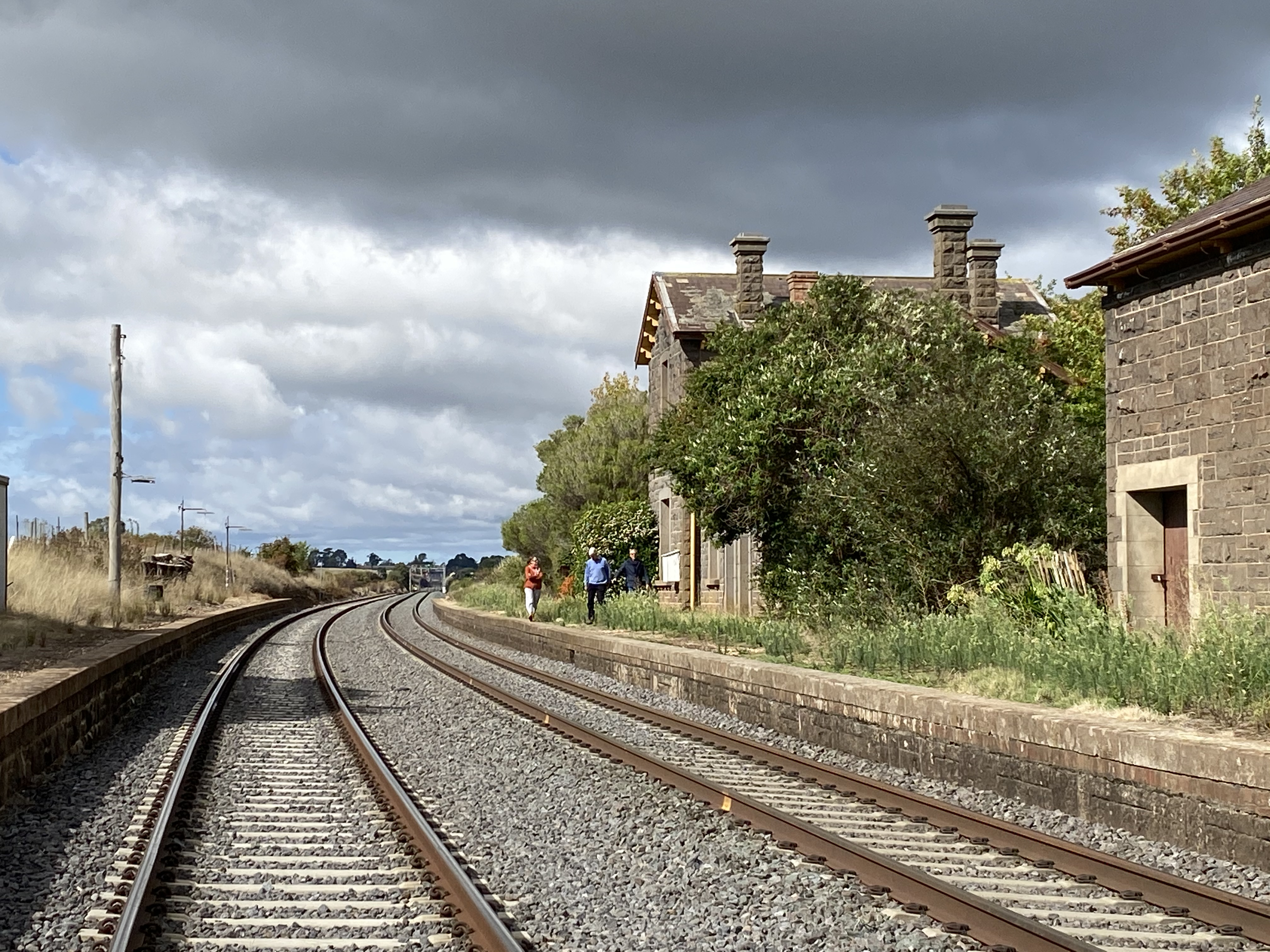
- Taradale Station, 2021

General information
- Line: Bendigo
- Platforms: 2
- Tracks: 2

Other information
- Status: Closed

History
- Opened: 1862
- Closed: 18 November 1976

Services
Preceding station	V/Line	Following station
Malmsbury towards Southern Cross	Bendigo line	Elphinstone towards Bendigo
List of closed railway stations in Victoria
Location

Taradale railway station was located was on the Bendigo line, 108 km (67 mi) from Southern Cross station, and served the township of Taradale.

The line through the station was originally double track, but the section north of Kyneton station was reduced to a single track as part of the Regional Fast Rail project. However, there is a 7.7 km (4.8 mi) crossing loop which incorporates the section of track through the former station, together with the nearby 198 m (650 ft) Taradale Viaduct and the closed Elphinstone station, further towards Bendigo.

Taradale was de-staffed by 1974, before closing to all business on 18 November 1976. The bluestone station building survives and is now a private residence, under lease from VicTrack.

In the 1970s, convicted paedophile, Robert Whitehead, along with another former senior Victorian transport bureaucrat and two other men, was granted a lease of the station building for at least 10 years, and Whitehead used the location to sexually assault boys. There is no evidence that his fellow lessees knew about his illegal activities there.
