= Swan Hill railway station =

Railway station in Victoria, Australia

Swan Hill
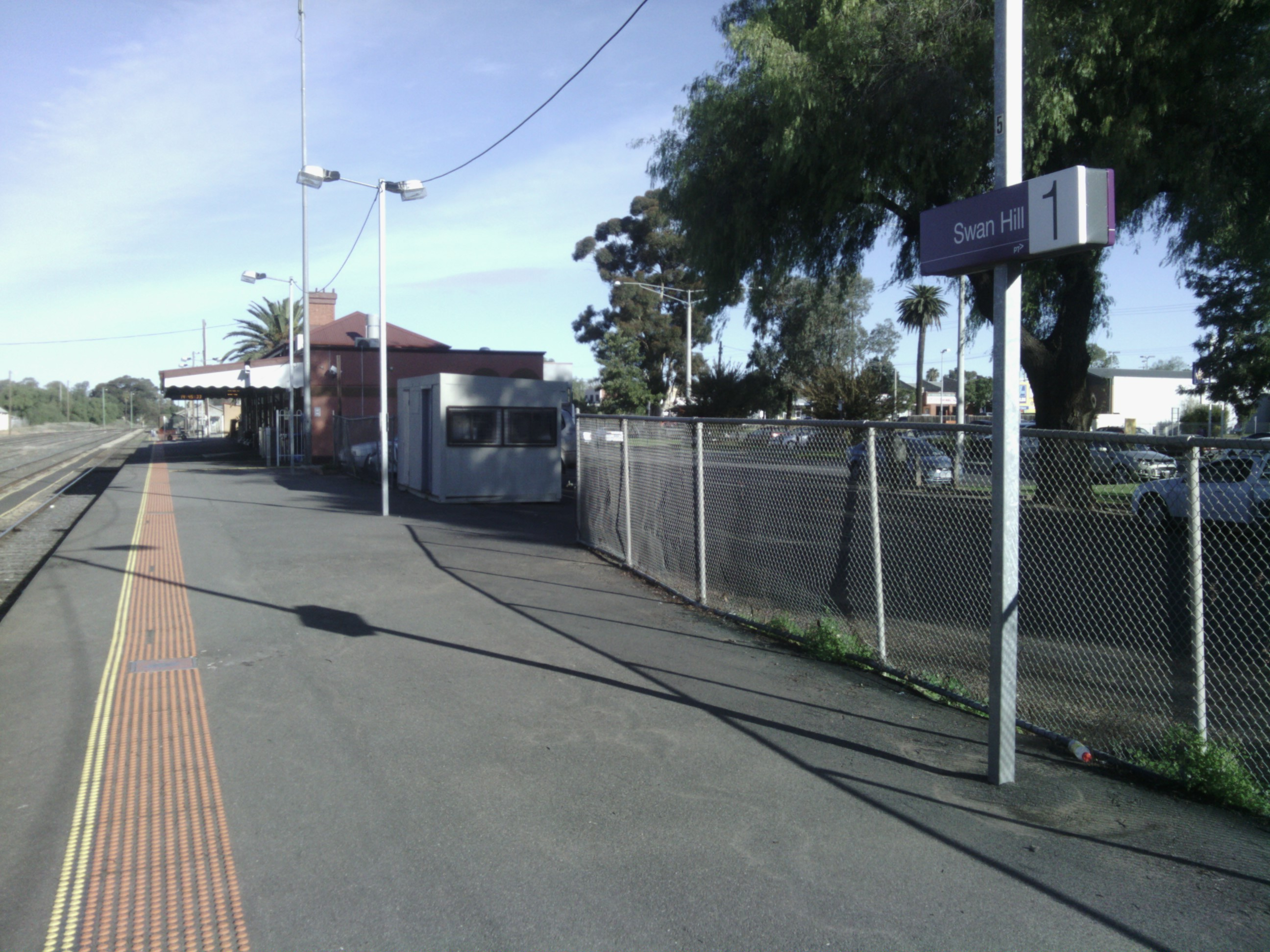
- Southbound view from platform in June 2015

General information
- Location: Curlewis Street, Swan Hill, Victoria 3585; Rural City of Swan Hill; Australia
- Coordinates: 35°20′29″S 143°33′45″E
- System: PTV regional rail station
- Owner: VicTrack
- Operator: V/Line
- Line: Swan Hill (Piangil)
- Distance: 345.29 kilometres from Southern Cross
- Platforms: 1
- Tracks: 6
- Connections: Coach

Construction
- Structure type: At-grade
- Parking: Yes
- Accessible: Yes

Other information
- Status: Operational, staffed part-time
- Station code: SWL
- Fare zone: Myki zone 29
- Website: Public Transport Victoria

History
- Opened: 30 May 1890; 136 years ago

Services
2 daily services to Southern Cross.
Trains travelling in the opposite direction terminate here.
Preceding station	V/Line	Following station
Kerang towards Southern Cross	Swan Hill line	Terminus
Former service
Preceding station	Disused railways	Following station
Lake Boga towards Bendigo	Piangil line	Woorinen towards Yungera
Location
- Location within Victoria

Swan Hill railway station is located on the Piangil line in Victoria, Australia. It serves the city of Swan Hill, and it opened on 30 May 1890.

The station serves as the current terminus for V/Line's Swan Hill line services. Beyond the station, Pacific National and Southern Shorthaul Railroad grain trains continue to the line's terminus at Piangil. A goods shed and silos exist near the station.

A 70 ft. turntable was provided at the station in 1940, replacing a 50 ft. turntable. The turntable was removed by September 1969.

Demolished station Lake Boga was located between Swan Hill and Kerang.

The Swan Hill (Railways Act) 1973 (Vic) facilitated the exchange of railway land that the City of Swan Hill had been using as a caravan park to the Council, in exchange for the Swan Hill wharf sidings which were transferred to railway ownership after eighty years of occupation.

== Platforms and services ==
Swan Hill station has one platform. It is serviced by V/Line Swan Hill line services.

Swan Hill platform arrangement
Platform	Line	Destination	Via	Source
1	Swan Hill line	Southern Cross	Bendigo	

=== Historic services (mail) ===
In the early to mid 1980s D vans, each with up to 25 t (25 long tons; 28 short tons) capacity, were attached to passenger trains and run loaded from Melbourne each evening and, on arrival, detached and shunted to the goods shed, returning empty on the next morning service. Perishable goods from Swan Hill could be loaded into the normal van attached to each passenger train, but that was a very rare occurrence. Non-perishable goods for Kerang would be railed through to Swan Hill and dropped off at Kerang on the return trip the next day. Other goods from Swan Hill were generally dispatched by normal goods trains, attached to block oil or grain trains.

== Transport links ==
V/Line operates a road coach service from Bendigo to Mildura via Swan Hill station.
