= Ruby railway station =

Former railway station in Victoria, Australia

Coordinates: 38°26′36″S 145°54′43″E

Ruby

General information
- Line: South Gippsland
- Platforms: 1
- Tracks: 2

Other information
- Status: Closed

History
- Opened: 17 December 1891; 134 years ago
- Closed: 1963; 63 years ago

Services
Preceding station	VicRail	Following station
Kardella towards Spencer Street	South Gippsland line	Leongatha towards Yarram
Location

Ruby was a railway station on the South Gippsland line in Victoria, Australia. The station was opened in December 1891, and operated until the 1960s, after which the station building and platform were dismantled and levelled, and all sidings were removed.

There is some evidence of the former station at the site, including the yards area, now used to store disused refrigerators and other white-goods, and flowering plants typically found at station sites, including hydrangeas and roses, but mow growing wild in the proximity. Images of rail vehicles and trains at Ruby station are displayed at Korumburra railway station.

Ruby is now on the route of the Great Southern Rail Trail, which runs along the formation of the former South Gippsland line.

The defunct tourist operation, South Gippsland Railway, had plans to construct a platform at the former station site, which would have provided additional stops for passengers and allowed for short shuttles train runs from either Leongatha or Korumburra.
