= Casterton railway line =

Former railway line in Victoria, Australia

Casterton Line

Overview
- Status: Closed
- Former connections: Portland
- Stations: 7

Service
- Type: Victorian Railways passenger and goods service

History
- Opened: 1884
- Closed: 1977

Technical
- Line length: 51 kilometres (32 mi)
- Number of tracks: 1

Interactive map of the Casterton railway line.

The Casterton Line was a branch line running north-west from the Portland Main Line, from the town of Branxholme to the town of Casterton, in Victoria, Australia. Opening in 1884, the line was 51 kilometres (32 mi) long and entirely single track, apart from at stations.

== History ==
The branch line was initially opened from Branxholme to Henty on 15 February 1884, with the rest of the line to Casterton opening later that year. There were five wayside stations: Murndal (later Miakite), Grassdale, Merino, Henty and Sandford. When the line opened, it allowed the efficient transport of passengers and local produce to the major local town of Hamilton, as well as the port of Portland and further afield. During the early 20th century, traffic on the line grew to the extent that there was a daily goods train to and from Hamilton.

In 1927, the Victorian Parliament authorised the construction of a 10-mile (16 km) extension of the line to Nangeela, largely to serve a soldier settler estate in the area. With the onset of the Great Depression in the 1930s, the extension was never built.

Both passenger and freight traffic declined following World War II, and the line was eventually closed completely on 12 September 1977, along with a number of other lines in the south-west of Victoria. Since its closure, the track has been completely removed and the rail reserve mostly sold. The Casterton station building, and the goods shed at Henty station, remain, along with some traces of the other three stations on the line.
