= Woodleigh railway station =

Former railway station in Victoria, Australia

Woodleigh

General information
- Line: Wonthaggi
- Platforms: 1
- Tracks: 1

Other information
- Status: Closed

History
- Opened: 1910
- Closed: 1978
- Former names: Hunter (1910)

Services
Preceding station	Disused railways	Following station
Nyora	Wonthaggi line	Kernot
	List of closed railway stations in Victoria	
Location

Woodleigh was a railway station on the Wonthaggi line, in Victoria, Australia.

The Wonthaggi railway line started about 2 miles (1.5 km) east (38°20′35.29″S 145°41′37.35″E) of Nyora, having originally being surveyed to be much closer to Loch, so as to follow the Bass River valley, and avoid any steep gradients. This new surveyed light railway route would save costs and no bridge would be built over Berry's Road in Nyora (38°20′48.88″S 145°41′41.32″E) on Crown Allotment 2035 Parish Of Jeetho West. This significant embankment still stands out to this very day. Five years later, the line required re-grading, and the Lang Lang Railway Company once again pushed for the construction of a cheaper coastal railway, instead of reducing the gradient of the original route and in particular, the very long junction, which was used to manage the route capacity coming into the switching station (Nyora), and other grading works along the inland route. The Crown Allotment 2005 in the Parish Of Jeetho West of the branch line now having far too high a grade.

Woodleigh is located in the Bass Coast Shire, and was almost the second station on the line, when settlers asked for a closer station to Nyora, and Crown Allotment 2004 in the Parish Of Jeetho West, where the line crosses the South Gippsland Highway on the north side (at 38°22′16.49″S 145°40′34.84″E), was put aside for this purpose.

When it opened with the line in 1910, it was called Hunter, but a few months later it was renamed Woodleigh. The station closed with the line in 1978. All that remains of it are the upright supports for the platform retaining wall.

The station building is now located in the Coal Creek Community Park and Museum at Korumburra, where it relocated there in 1972. Originally the entry to the park prior to the present foyer being built in the 1980s, it now houses the Railway Museum.
