= Millewa South railway line =

Former railway line in Victoria, Australia

Millewa South

Overview
- Status: Closed, track removed
- Termini: Nowingi; Millewa South (planned)
- Stations: 4 (planned)

History
- Commenced: 1929
- Opened: 1942
- Closed: 1988

Technical
- Track gauge: 1,600 mm (5 ft 3 in)

The Millewa South railway line, sometimes referred to as the Nowingi-Millewa South railway line was a freight-only railway located in the Millewa region of Victoria, Australia. It branched from the Mildura line at Nowingi, and was planned to run due west for 35 miles (56 km). The intention was to open up the surrounding area for wheat growing, once irrigation infrastructure been installed. A possible extension across the South Australian border to Meribah was mooted.

== History ==
The act authorising the building of the line was passed by the Victorian Parliament on 30 December 1927. Construction began in 1929, with a ballast pit siding being provided to supply ballast for the line. Stations were to be provided at the 10-mile (16 km), 18-mile (29 km) and 24 miles (39 km) posts, as well as the terminus. The stations were to have a crossing loop, a passenger platform and a goods shed.

The line was never completed. In July 1929, construction was temporarily suspended, having reached the 24 1/2-mile (39.4 km) mark. The irrigation facilities, that were to be large underground tanks which captured and stored rainwater, were never constructed. In December 1930, the first 16 miles (26 km) of the line were leased to Brunswick Plaster Mills to haul gypsum from the adjacent salt pans. For a time in the 1930s, the Hercules Plaster Co. had its own gypsum loading point at the 13-mile (21 km) mark.

In 1941 or 1942, the line was formally handed over to the Victorian Railways by the construction authority, and the track beyond the 16-mile (26 km) gypsum loading site was dismantled. Brunswick Plaster Mills eventually took over the task of hauling the gypsum, using its own rail tractor, and then a diesel locomotive built on the frame of a former Victorian Railways Y class steam locomotive. In January 1981, Brunswick Plaster Mills purchased a Victorian Railways M class diesel locomotive (M232) to haul trains on the branch.

The lease of the line to Brunswick Plaster Mills was terminated in January 1988, and the rails were removed shortly after.
