= Nyora railway station =

Railway station in Victoria, Australia

Coordinates: 38°19′59″S 145°40′14″E

Nyora

General information
- Location: 93.90 km (58.35 mi) from Flinders Street
- System: South Gippsland Tourist Railway station
- Line: South Gippsland Tourist Railway
- Platforms: 1
- Tracks: 4 (2 were used by SGR, 1 & 4)

Other information
- Status: Closed 16 January 2016

History
- Opened: 11 November 1890; 135 years ago 1994; 32 years ago (reopened)
- Closed: 24 July 1993; 33 years ago

Services
| Preceding station | VicRail | Following station |
|---|---|---|
| Caldermeade towards Spencer Street | South Gippsland line | Loch towards Yarram |
| Caldermeade towards Spencer Street | Wonthaggi line | Woodleigh towards Wonthaggi |
| Preceding station | V/Line | Following station |
| Lang Lang towards Spencer Street | South Gippsland line | Loch towards Leongatha |
Location

Nyora is a railway station on the former South Gippsland line in South Gippsland, Victoria, Australia.

The station was also formerly used as the northern terminus of the South Gippsland Tourist railway, after passenger operations on the line ceased beyond Cranbourne station in 1993.

The station itself and outbuildings were restored, albeit with a few changes, by the volunteers of the South Gippsland Railway. This included painting, general repairs, and reinstatement of the floor in the main room, to form a public meeting and exhibition space. Since the Tourist Railway ceased operations in 2015, the station has become neglected, despite the opening of the Nyora to Loch section of the Great Southern Rail Trail in 2023.

The station contains a nearly fully operational turntable. Nyora was the final station on the line from Melbourne before the Wonthaggi line branched off from the main South Gippsland (Port Albert / Woodside) line.

Tourist train services to Nyora recommenced in January 2008, following a closure of the line from Loch for several years due to re-alignment works to the South Gippsland Highway including the Loch Bypass. However, these services have ceased with the extension of the railtrail.

== Current status ==
A new emphasis in linking the community with the railway operations. More local people have been involved in some capacity with the railway in the 12 months to February 2008, which has led to development of groups with an association with the railway in local towns. In Nyora, a local "Nyora Subcommittee" has been established for this purpose, with one of the group's objectives being to make use of the currently disused Nyora station goods shed.

Nyora Railway Station and the start of the rail trail.

Reopening the South Gippsland railway line as far as Leongatha is continuing to feature as a prominent issue for the region. A South Gippsland Shire Council Priority Projects documents released in June 2013 acknowledged that the return of rail as a major community priority where funding and support are sought from all forms of level government. In early 2014, a report into the extensions of the Melbourne metropolitan rail system identified the population growth corridor from Cranbourne to Koo-Wee-Rup along the disused Leongatha line as a key planning priority. The South and West Gippsland Transport Group, a public transportation and rail lobby group established in April 2011 that is closely associated with the South Gippsland Shire Council and local forms of government has continued to campaign for an integrated transport plan in the region, which includes rail at the forefront of the proposal. Previously, the group was classified as the South Gippsland Transport Users Group and had amalgamated with numerous rail lobby groups in 1994 shortly after the rail passenger service to Leongatha was withdrawn in July 1993 and the line to Barry Beach and Yarram was formally closed in June 1992 and dismantled by December 1994. One notable milestone that this group achieved in the past was running a successful campaign that saw passenger rail services reinstated to Leongatha on 9 December 1984. Despite the political promise to revive the railway line for freight and passenger services by the Steve Bracks led Victorian state Labor government in 1999 being abandoned in 2008 by his successor John Brumby, a public community campaign involving the South and West Gippsland Transport Group as well as community group "Restore Rup Rail" is continuing to lobby and work collaboratively with key stakeholders and governments to reinstate rail services that focuses on improving transport accessibility in the region.

== Public transport—V/Line ==
V/Line coach services are provided to the township, with the bus stop opposite the now closed Hotel being the main point for passenger drop-off and pickup. The coach services originate at Leongatha and travel via the townships served by the former South Gippsland Rail Line (including Nyora), stopping at Korumburra, Loch, Nyora, Lang Lang, Koo Wee Rup, and Cranbourne. Some services terminate at Cranbourne, and others terminate at Southern Cross station in the Melbourne CBD.

== Television ==
The railway station was used as a former railway station building converted into a radio station office in the ABC TV produced "Something In The Air". The town in which the station was set was "Emu Springs", and features some other Nyora landmarks, including the Nyora (Emu Springs) General Store, the local Church and the Nyora Hotel. Other scenes were shot in the western Victorian town of Clunes.

== Location ==
Nyora Railway Station can be accessed from the Nyora Road (off South Gippsland Hwy A440), and from Henley Street. Henley Street can be accessed from the Lang Lang - Poowong Road. Picnic areas are provided within the Nyora Station precinct, and a nearby post office and General Store.

== Gallery ==
View of re-painted station building (March 2009)

View from station platform (March 2009)

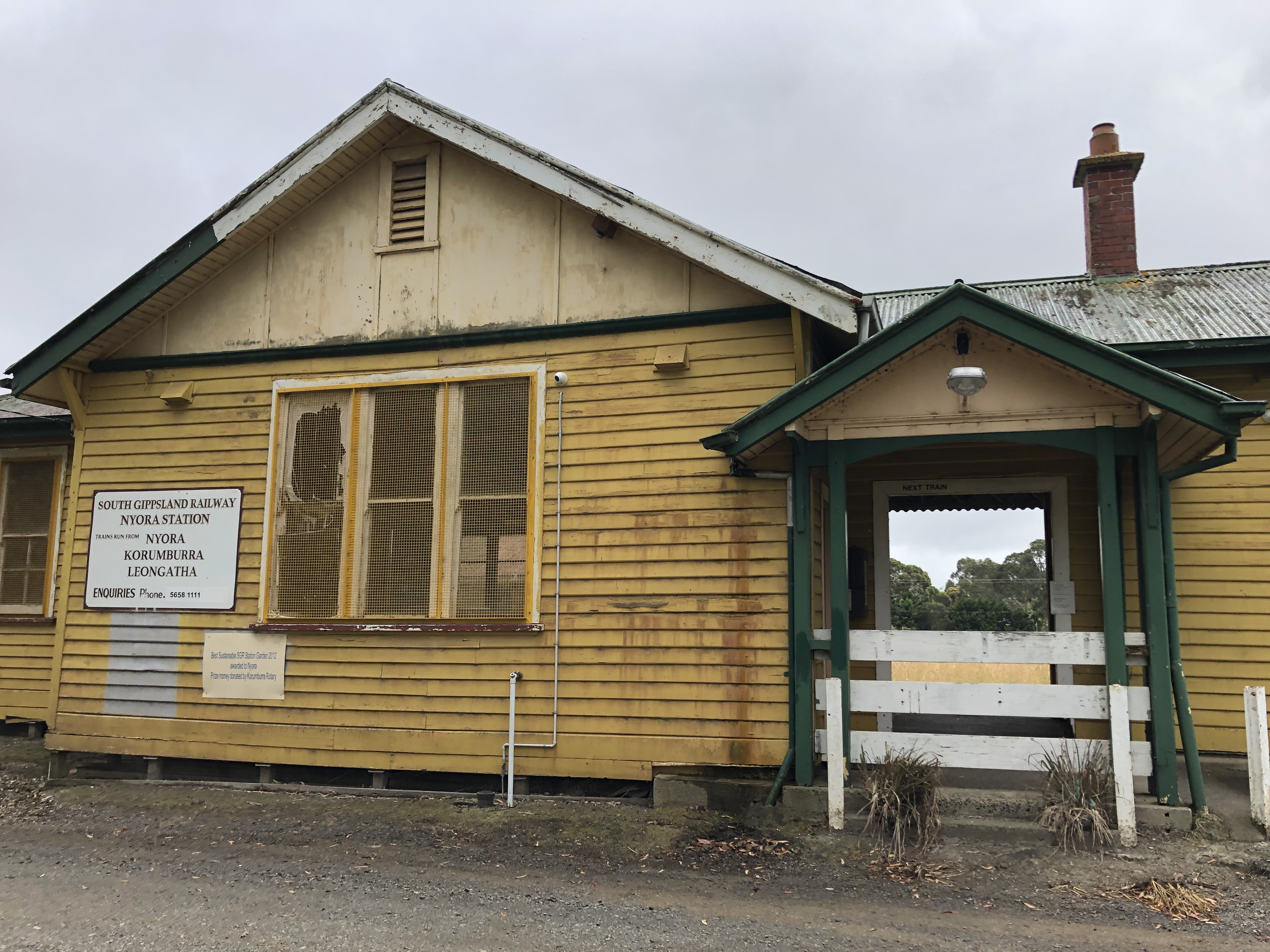
Nyora Station January 2023

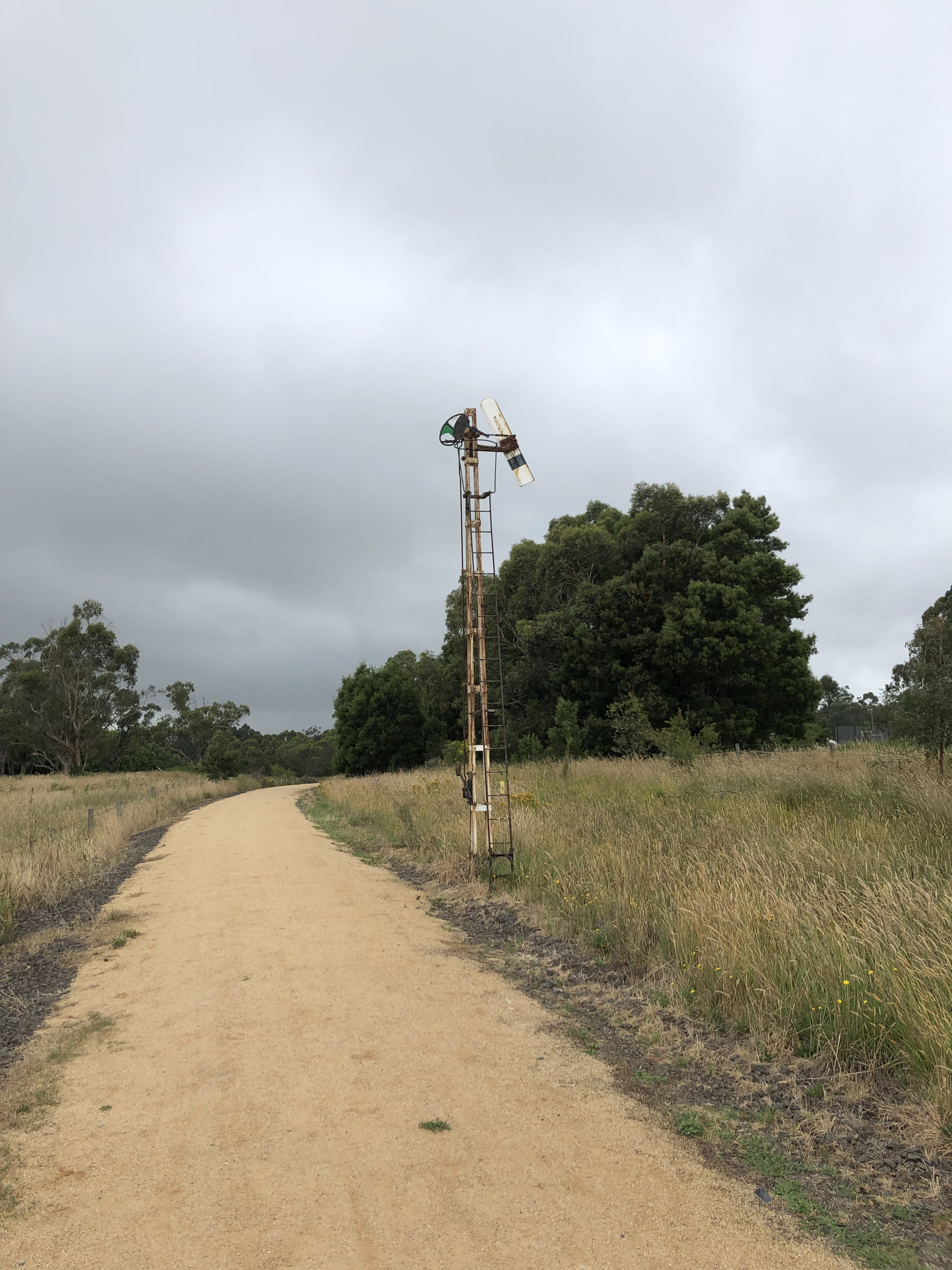
Nyora Station January 2023

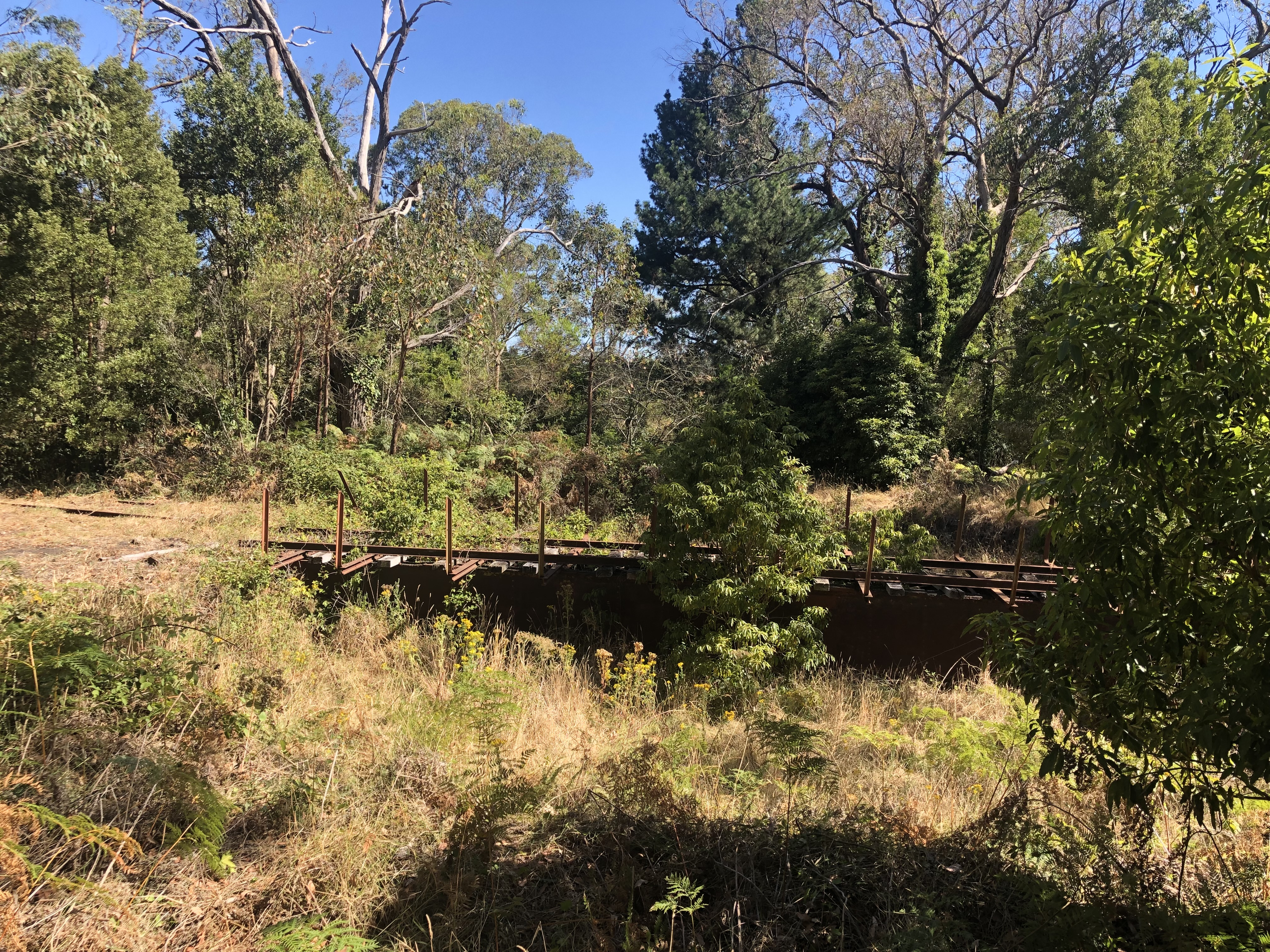
Turntable at Nyora

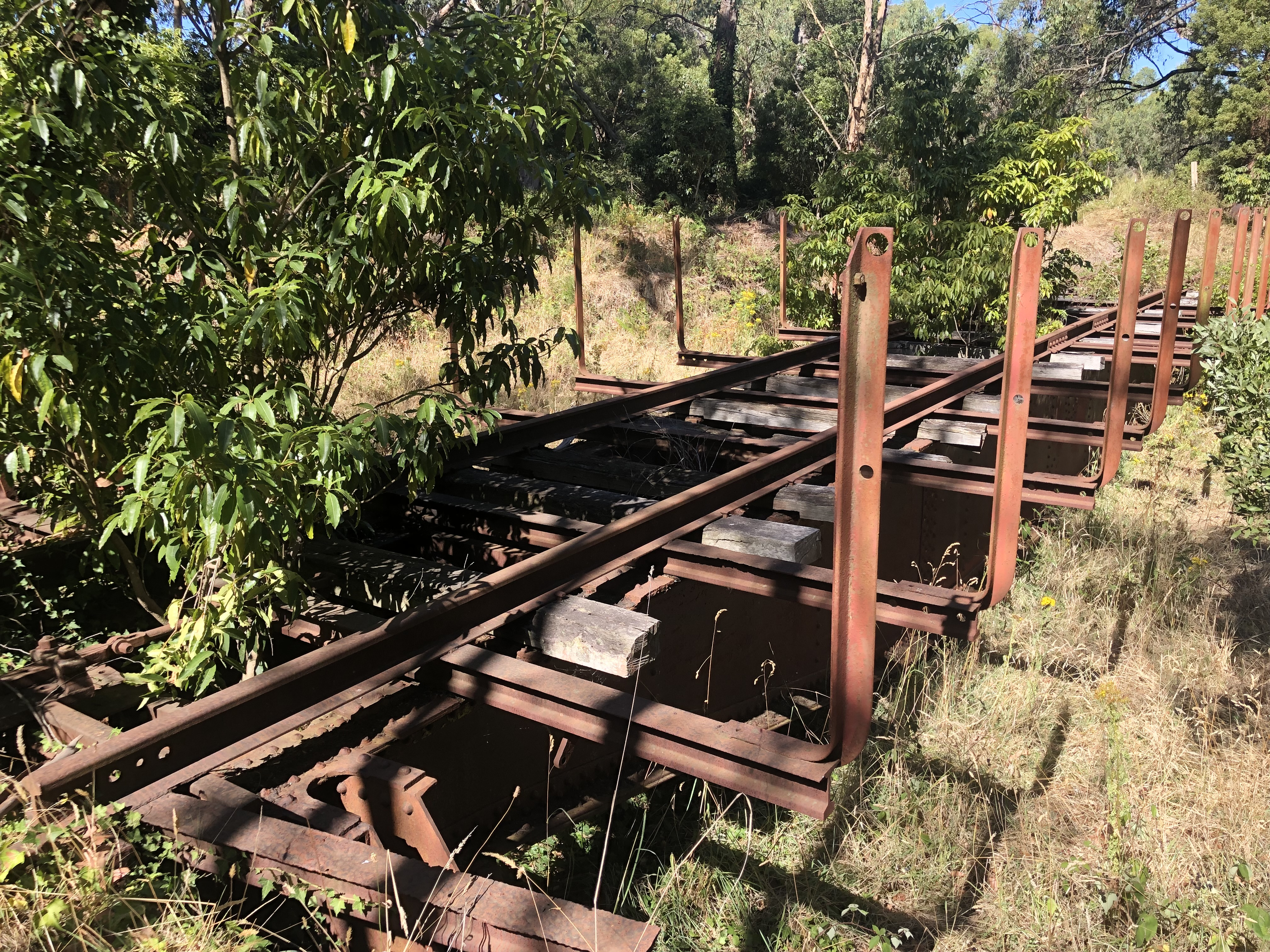
Turntable near the Nyora Railway Station

== Station layout ==
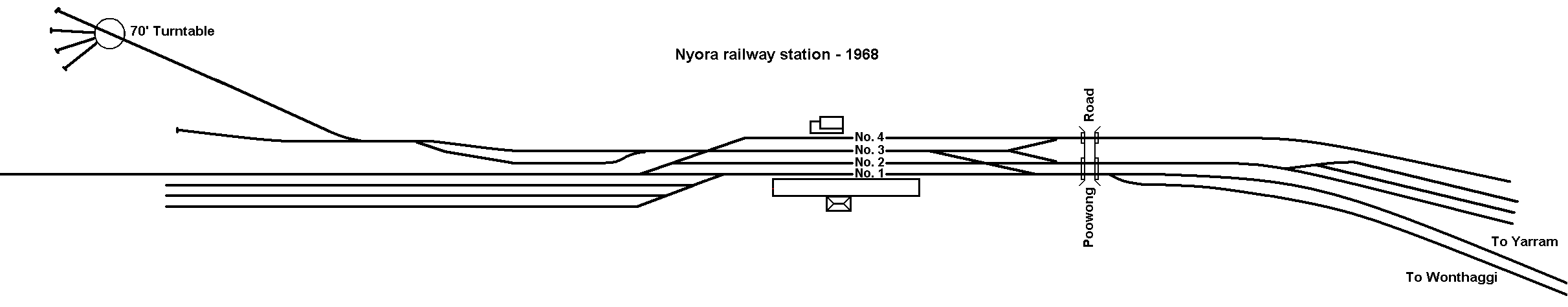
