= Woodley station =

Woodley station may refer to:

- Woodley railway station, Stockport, England
- Woodley station (Los Angeles Metro), Los Angeles

== See also ==
- Woodleigh station (disambiguation)
