= Burrumbeet railway station =

Former railway station in Victoria, Australia

Burrumbeet

General information
- Coordinates: 37°28′18.53″S 143°39′25.74″E
- Line: Dimboola
- Platforms: 1
- Tracks: 1

Other information
- Status: Closed

History
- Opened: 11 August 1874
- Closed: 24 July 1972 (Passenger traffic); 18 December 1987 (Safeworking)

Services
Preceding station	Disused railways	Following station
Ballarat	Serviceton line	Trawalla
	List of closed railway stations in Victoria	
Track layout
Location

Burrumbeet is a closed railway station located in the town of Burrumbeet, on the Ararat railway line in Victoria, Australia. In addition, a short branch line ran southwards from the main line to serve Burrumbeet Racecourse.

Construction of the line from Ballarat through Burrumbeet to Ararat was authorised in December 1871. Work commenced in September 1872 from Burrumbeet, with little excavation required over the plains to Ballarat, with the line and station opened on 11 August 1874. In the years of 1874–75, 3208 passengers travelled from the station, by 1885 it had increased to 4040.

Two other railway platforms existed in the area. Burrumbeet Racecourse platform was open to passengers between 1892 and 1904, for the use of special trains running for race meetings at the nearby Burrumbeet Racecourse, the final leg of the journey being by horse and buggy. That platform was replaced by a short branch line to a new station at the racecourse itself. The branch opened in 1904, and closed in July 1948 due to declining traffic.

The original station building at Burrumbeet was of brick construction with a separate signal box. In January 1965, they were replaced by a new building, incorporating a signal bay. The 30-lever interlocking frame in the signal bay was installed on 12 November 1964, and was originally located at Herne's Oak, on the Gippsland line.

The station closed to passengers on 24 July 1972, with complete closure occurring on 18 December 1987, when all safeworking facilities, points and crossings were removed. The station had been staffed (at least for safeworking purposes) from its opening until its final closure. In August 1989, the station building was demolished.
