= Macorna =

- Town
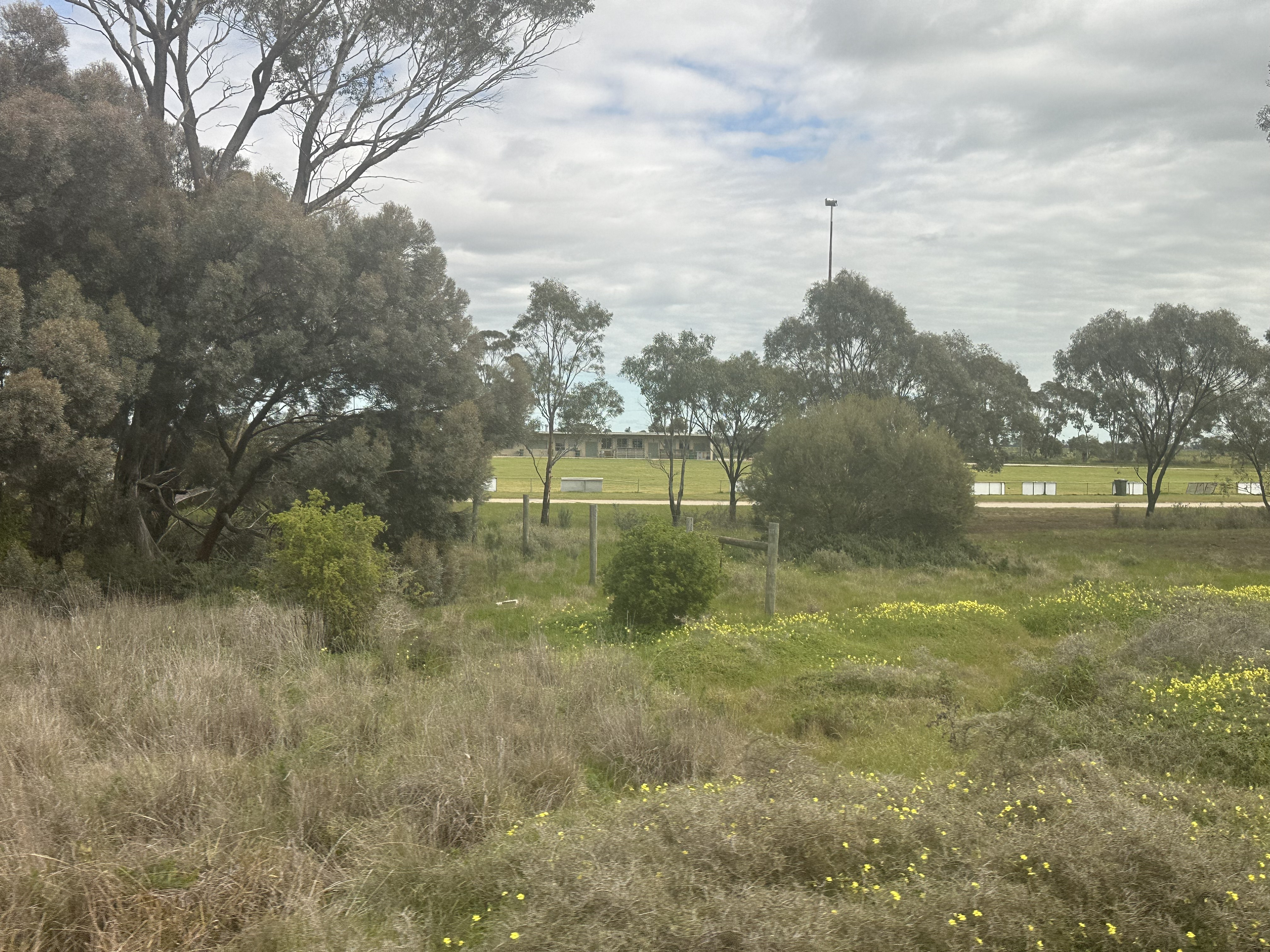
- Macorna Recreation Reserve in August 2026

- Coordinates: 35°55′07″S 144°01′50″E
- Country: Australia
- State: Victoria
- LGAs: Shire of Gannawarra; Shire of Loddon
- Location: 267 km (166 mi) from Melbourne; 103 km (64 mi) from Bendigo; 25 km (16 mi) from Kerang

Government
  - State electorate: Murray Plains
  - Federal division: Mallee
- Elevation: 85 m (279 ft)

Population
  - Total: 67 (2021 census)
- Postcode: 3579
- Mean max temp: 22.8 °C (73.0 °F)
- Mean min temp: 9.4 °C (48.9 °F)
- Annual rainfall: 368.9 mm (14.52 in)

Macorna is a locality the Shire of Gannawarra and the Shire of Loddon, Victoria, Australia. At the 2021 census, Macorna had a population of 67.

== Transport ==
The locality is on the Yungera railway line and the railway reached Macorna in 1884. Macorna station closed in 1981.

== Community ==
Macorna has an Australian Rules football team competing in the Golden Rivers Football League. Macorna was a founding member of the Kerang and District Football League in 1946, which was renamed the Golden Rivers Football League in 1998. Prior to World War II the club played in a number of local leagues, including the Tandarra-Macorna Line Football Association, Pyramid Hill Football League, Leagher Football Association, and Northern Districts Football League.

The Macorna Pony Club was formed in 2004,

There is also a Landcare group and a fire station.
