= Carisbrook, Victoria =

Carisbrook
- Town
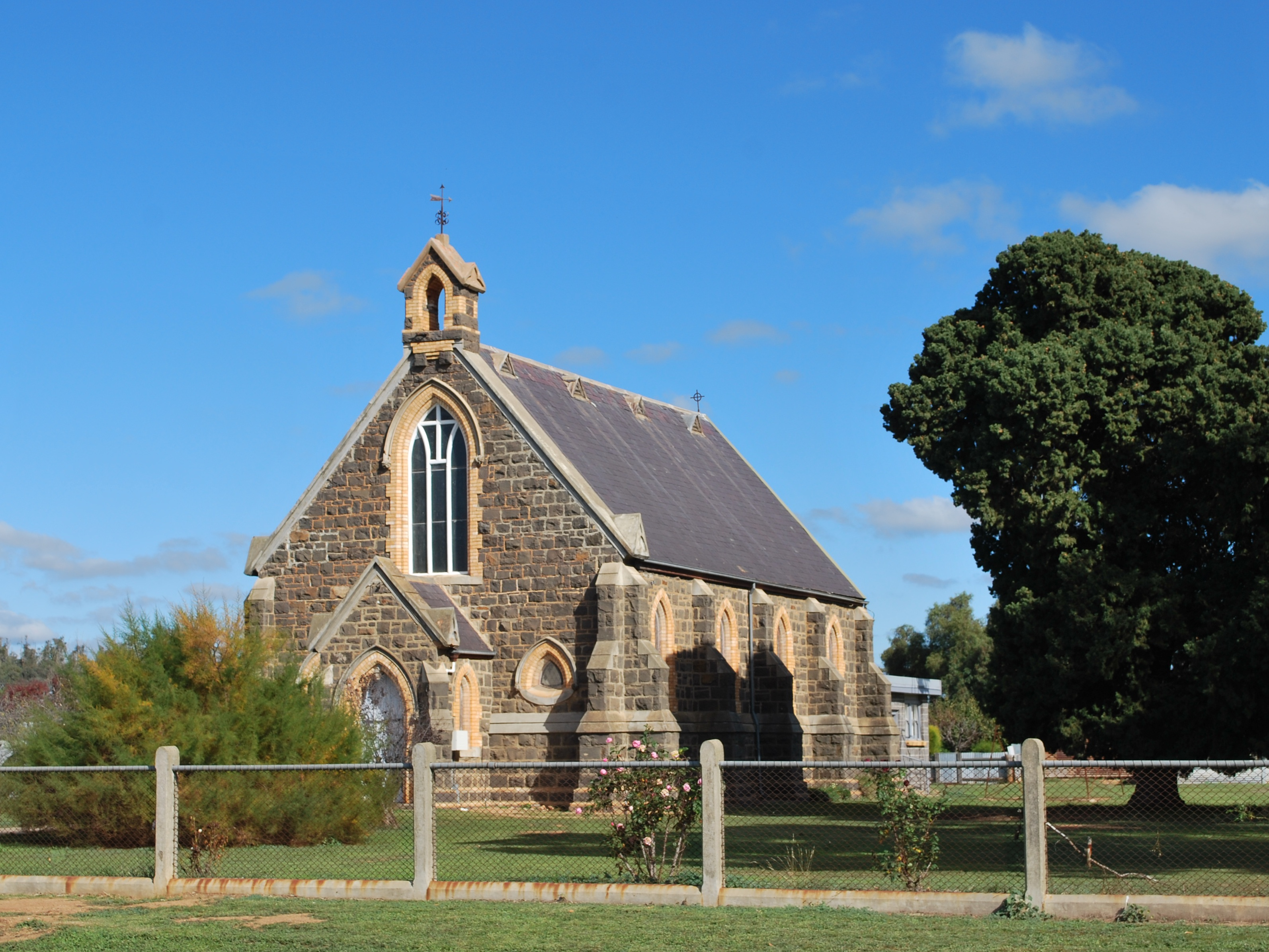
- St Paul's Anglican church

- Coordinates: 37°02′53″S 143°49′01″E
- Country: Australia
- State: Victoria
- LGAs: Shire of Central Goldfields; Mount Alexander Shire
- Location: 165 km (103 mi) NW of Melbourne; 80 km (50 mi) N of Ballarat; 82 km (51 mi) SW of Bendigo; 7 km (4.3 mi) E of Maryborough
- Established: late 1840s - early 1850s

Government
  - State electorate: Ripon
  - Federal divisions: Bendigo; Mallee

Population
  - Total: 1,115 (2016 census)
- Postcode: 3464

Carisbrook is a town in the Shire of Central Goldfields and Mount Alexander Shire, Victoria, Australia, located on the Pyrenees Highway, 7 kilometres (4.3 mi) east of the regional and local government centre of Maryborough. At the 2016 census, Carisbrook had a population of 1,115. Carisbrook is closely linked with Maryborough historically, socially and economically.

== Transport ==
Carisbrook situated on the Pyrenees Highway between Maryborough and Castlemaine, with coach services to both of these towns.

The Moolort railway line is a partially closed railway line also connecting Maryborough to Castlemaine, via Carisbrook station and Moolort.

== Media ==
The Carisbrook Mercury is a weekly newspaper distributed locally, based in Carisbrook Town Hall. The Maryborough Advertiser, distributed in the Central Goldfields region, and the regional radio station, Goldfields FM 99.1, are based in Maryborough.

== Sport ==
The local Australian Rules football team is the Carisbrook Redbacks. They play in the Maryborough Castlemaine District Football League. The Maryborough Harness Racing Club has regular meetings at its racetrack, which is located near Carisbrook. There is also a lawn bowls club, a gun club and a leisure centre.

== Notable people ==
- Aston, Matilda Ann (1873–1947)
- Long, George Merrick (1874-1930)
- Russell, Percy Joseph (1861–1946)

== See also ==
- Carisbrook railway station
