= Mannerim railway station =

Railway station in Victoria, Australia

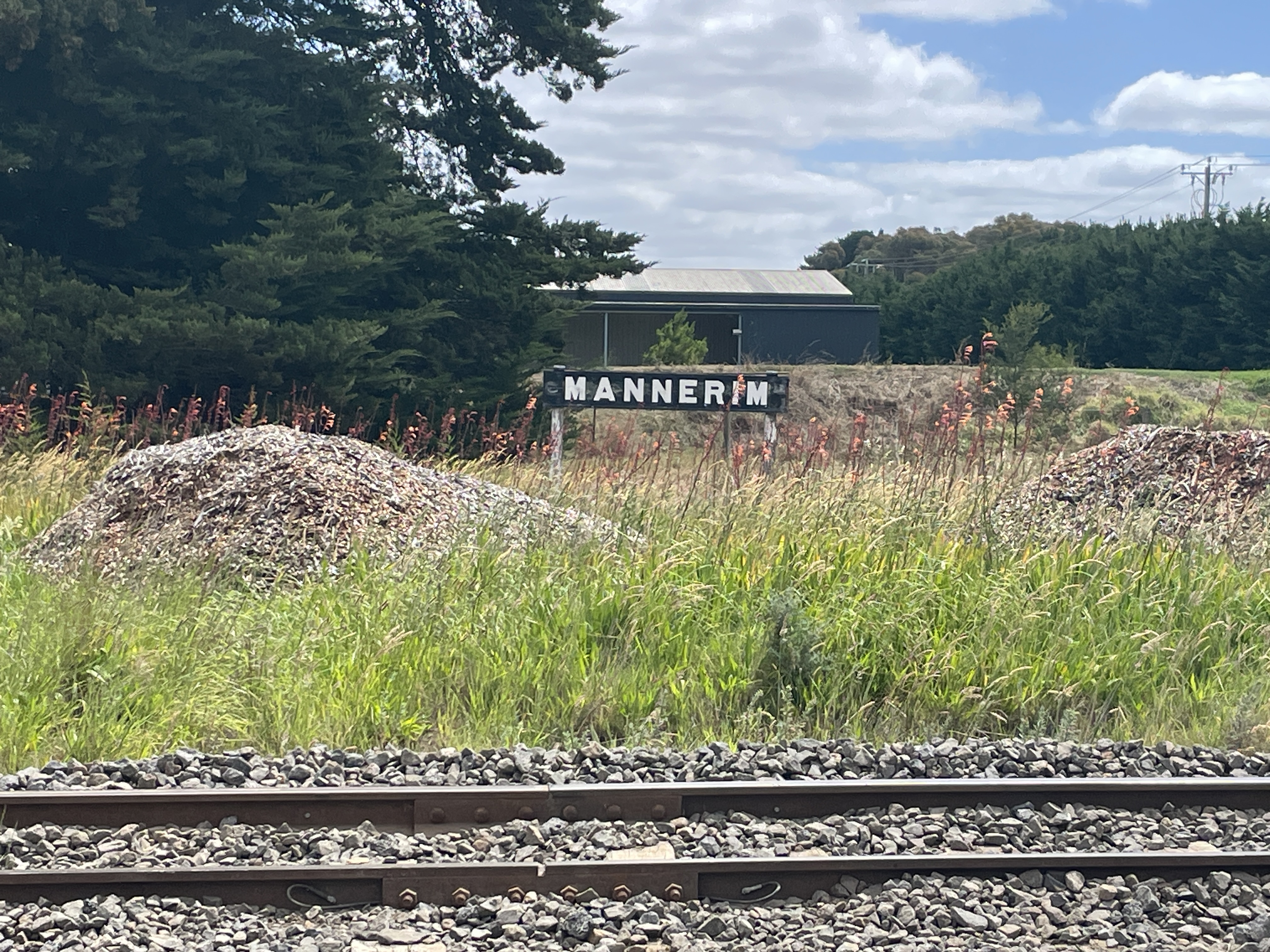
Mannerim railway station, Swan Bay Road

Mannerim railway station is a closed station on the Bellarine Railway in Victoria, Australia. It opened on 1 February 1883 as Marcus Hill, and was renamed Mannerim on 28 October 1890. The passenger station and goods shed and platform were located opposite each other at the up end of the yard adjacent to Swan Bay Road. A small settlement had existed in the area around the station at Mannerim, with a public hall, store, post office state school and fire brigade. The facilities were shifted or closed over the years and the station did little business.

Mannerim station closed on 6 February 1961. It is located next to some old goods carriages in Mannerim. The site is on the Queenscliff tourist railway line which runs between Queenscliff and Drysdale.

Across the railway line from the station is the Mannerim Memorial Indigenous Garden established by the Bellarine Landcare Group and Bellarine Secondary College.
