= Burrumbeet =

Burrumbeet Victoria
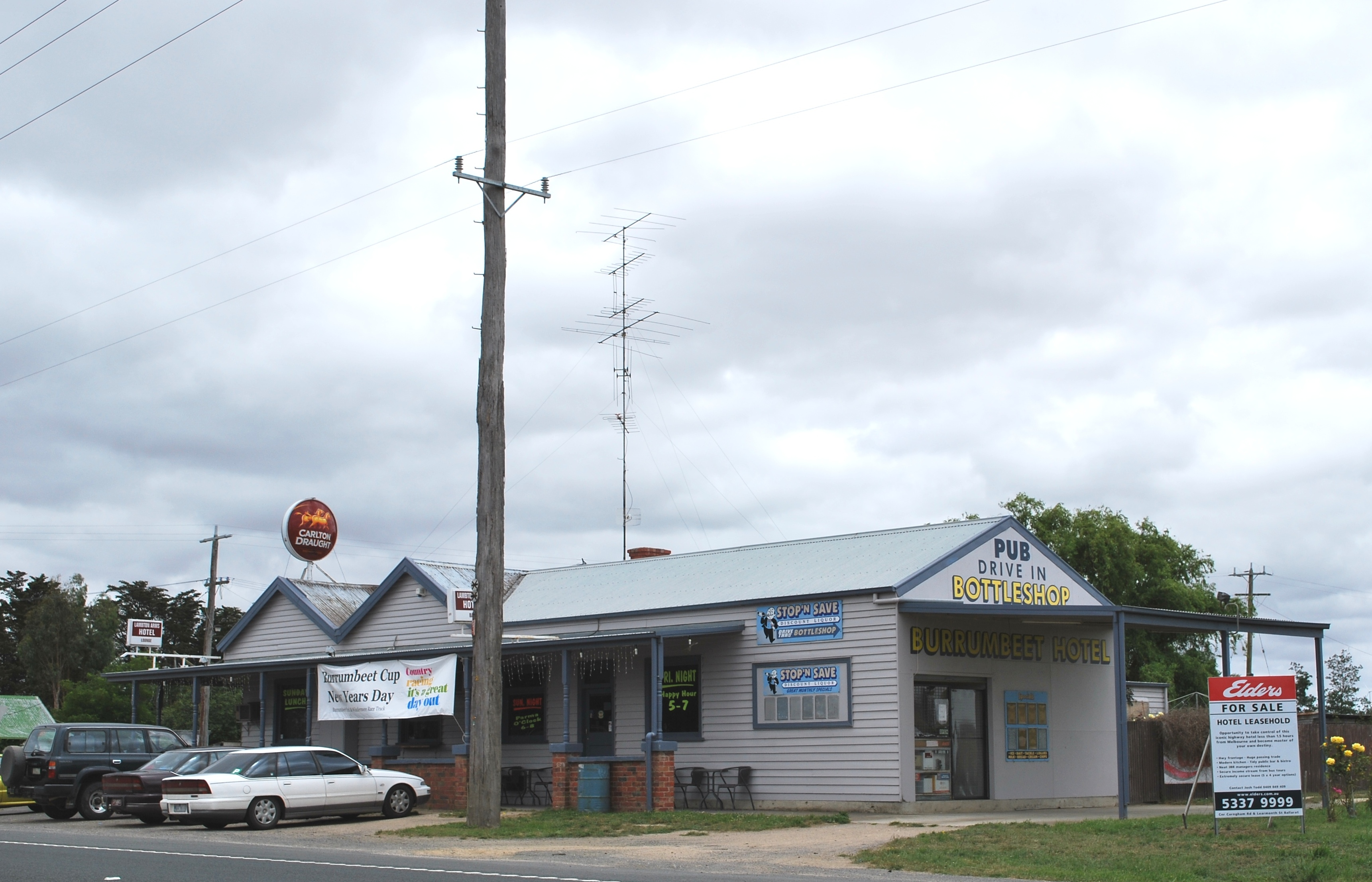
- Burrumbeet Hotel

- Coordinates: 37°28′S 143°39′E
- Population: 249 (2021 census)
- Postcode(s): 3352
- Location: 136 km (85 mi) W of Melbourne; 24 km (15 mi) W of Ballarat
- LGA(s): City of Ballarat; Pyrenees Shire
- State electorate(s): Ripon
- Federal division(s): Ballarat, Wannon

Burrumbeet is a town in western Victoria, Australia. The town is located on the Western Highway, 136 kilometres (85 mi) west of the state capital, Melbourne and 24 kilometres (15 mi) west of the regional centre, Ballarat. At the 2021 census, Burrumbeet and the surrounding area had a population of 249.

Lake Burrumbeet, a large but shallow eutrophic lake, is located nearby.

== History ==
Burrumbeet Post Office opened on 1 September 1857 and closed in 1978. In August 1874, Burrumbeet railway station was opened, along with the line from Ballarat to Ararat. The station was closed to passengers in 1972, and was completely closed in December 1987.

== Today ==
Burrumbeet has a Thoroughbred horse racing club, the Burrumbeet Park & Windermere Racing Club, which holds one race meeting a year, the Burrumbeet Cup meeting on New Year's Day.

== See also ==
Burrumbeet railway station
