= Kerang–Koondrook Tramway =

Former private railway in Victoria, Australia

Kerang-Koondrook Tramway

Overview
- Status: Closed
- Former connections: Bendigo-Swan Hill line
- Stations: 4

Service
- Type: Heavy rail
- Operator(s): Shire of Swan Hill 1889-1898; Shire of Kerang 1898-1952; Victorian Railways 1952-1976

History
- Opened: 19 July 1889
- Closed: 3 March 1981

Technical
- Line length: 13.94 mi (22.43 km)
- Track gauge: 5 ft 3 in (1,600 mm)

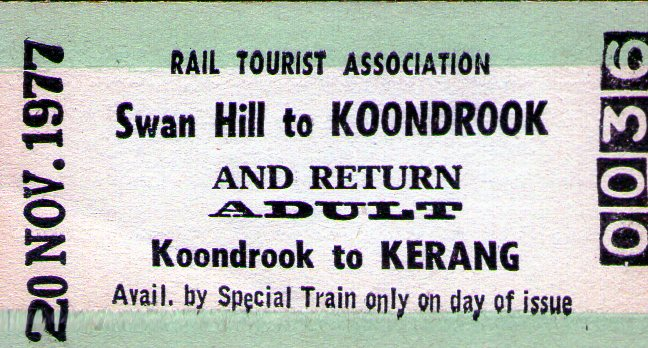
Swan Hill-Koondrook souvenir rail ticket, 1977

The Kerang Tramway railmotor, consisting of a Ford V8 truck chassis towing a rebuilt 1885 four-wheel passenger carriage

.

The Kerang–Koondrook Tramway was an Australian private railway of 5 ft 3 in (1,600 mm) broad gauge, running from Kerang station, on the state-owned Victorian Railways Piangil railway line, to the Murray River town of Koondrook, with intermediate stations at Yeoburn, Hinksons, Teal Point and Gannawarra.

Construction of the 13.94 mi (22.43 km)-long line was initiated by the Shire of Swan Hill in 1887, under the terms of the Tramways in Country Districts Act 1886, which allowed local governments in country areas to construct tramways, with financial assistance from the Victorian government, to a limit of £2,000 a mile. The tramway was opened in July 1889. On 31 December 1898, the area of the Shire of Swan Hill centred on Kerang became the Shire of Kerang. By 1920, the tramway's construction had cost £39,229.

In 1929, a four-wheel vertical boilered locomotive was imported to work the tramway, manufactured by the Sentinel Waggon Works in Shrewsbury. It was withdrawn in 1941 and scrapped in 1952. There is a description of a journey on the railway in 1938 in an article in the March 1971 edition of the Bulletin, published by the Australian Railway Historical Society.

On 1 February 1952, ownership of the tramway was transferred to the Victorian Railways. In its later years, passenger services on the line were run by a 102hp Walker railmotor, paid for by the Victorian Education Department, to convey school children. The service was withdrawn on 16 December 1976. A railfan farewell special on the line, with a train hauled by T356, ran on 20 November 1977. The line was officially closed on 3 March 1981.

== Kerang Tramway railmotor ==
During World War II, a unique composite railbus designed by Joe O'Halloran was introduced to handle the passenger traffic on the line. The vehicle consisted of a Ford V8 truck chassis coupled to a modified four-wheel passenger carriage originally built in 1885, effectively creating a six-wheel semi-trailer on flanged wheels. A October 1948 article in the Australian Railway Historical Society Bulletin described the unconventional construction:

It is the queerest mating of rail and road transport — a Ford V8 truck chassis towing a re-built, four-wheel passenger car built in 1885, to make a six-wheel semi-trailer on wheels. A streamlined effect has been attempted by adding a sharply inclined false roof from above the driving compartment to the top of the car roof, which, from the front, looks exactly like a truck coming through the side of a house.

Locally nicknamed "old square wheels", the Ford V8 railbus was newly registered as 45RM when ownership of the tramway was given to the Victorian Railways in 1952. The Ford V8 railbus remained in service until 1958 when it was replaced by 102hp Walker Railmotors, it was then sold to a buyer in Runnymede, it sat on the buyer's property for decades. Attempts were made to buy the railmotor in the early 1990s but were unsuccessful. In Late 2023 the railmotor was bought by the Kerang Historical Society, the carriage and truck were delivered to the Kerang Museum in stages. It is being restored as of right now with progress going well

Companies
| First | Kerang–Koondrook Tramway; 1889 – 1 February 1952 | Succeeded by Victorian Railways |
