= Moolort railway line =

Railway line in Australia

Castlemaine-Maryborough

Overview
- Status: Closed (apart from 1.5 km Castlemaine – Maldon Junction)
- Connecting lines: Mildura Line at Maryborough and Bendigo Line at Castlemaine
- Stations: 6

Service
- Type: Cross Country
- Rolling stock: 153HP Walker Railmotor

History
- Opened: 7 July 1874
- Completed: 7 July 1874
- Closed: 17 December 2004 (Moolort - Maldon Junction); 2011 (Moolort - Maryborough)

Technical
- Line length: 54.653 km (33.96 mi)
- Number of tracks: Single track

The Moolort Line was a cross-country railway line which connected Maryborough and Castlemaine in Victoria, Australia. The line, now defunct, starts in Castlemaine, passes through Campbells Creek, Yapeen, Guildford, Strangways, Newstead, Moolort, and Carisbrook, before joining the Mildura line at Maryborough.

== History ==
The Castlemaine and Maryborough railway, known as the Moolort line, was started in September 1872, raising local concerns over the effect trains would have on horses.

Its course and construction of its first section from Castlemaine to Newstead was described in the Melbourne Argus;

The line will be constructed upon economic principles. The width of gauge will be 5ft. 3in., so that although the cost of construction will be greatly reduced even in comparison with the North Eastern line, the railway will not be built upon what is known as the narrow gauge or cheap principle. All the bridges and culverts will be of wood instead of iron or stone. The redgum required for the sleepers and piles will be procured from the Murray district, and the posts and rails for fencing from the Bullarook forest near Daylesford. The contract price of the first section is £19,500 [A$2,492,000.00 value in 2021]. The contractor will have to lay, but not supply, the rails and the stations will form a separate contract. The ruling gradient on the first section is 1 in 50, and the heaviest 1 in 43. Active operations will be commenced to-day, and before the expiration of the week it is expected that about 300 men will be employed. The average rate of wages given will be about 6s. 6d. per day for navvies. It is anticipated that unless something unforeseen occurs, the first section will be completed within 13 months. Mr. Gibbons is the engineer employed by Mr. Doran, and Mr. Wilkinson will have charge of the line for the Government, under the direction of Mr. Green, the resident engineer.

Eight hundred schoolchildren were the first to travel from Maryborough to Castlemaine at the line's inauguration on 26 June 1874. Already conveying freight, the line was opened to general passenger traffic on 7 July 1874. There was agitation for a connection from Daylesford via Yandoit but it was refused.

A derailment of an entire passenger train near Carisbrook, during general floods in the district in 1877, was recounted in the Colac Herald in 1896.

== Demise ==
Maryborough, where Moolort line previously connected to the Victorian Broad Gauge Network

The last passenger rail service operated between Castlemaine and Maryborough on 31 July 1977, just over a century after the line was opened, and the track between Moolort and Maldon Junction was out of use after 2004.

A small number of ballast and grain trains continued to use the line until 2010.

In late 2010 flooding in the Carisbrook area damaged a small section of the track leading to the full closure of the line. The turnout at Maryborough remained connected until 2017 when it was removed during Murray Basin works.

The Victorian Goldfields Railway (VGR) operates on the first 1.5 km of the line, between Castlemaine and Maldon Junction, from where its line branches to Maldon. Ballast trains ran on the section of track from Moolort to Maryborough for a number of years, but the whole line from Maldon Junction to Maryborough is now closed. In 2020, with permission from VicTrack, the VGR removed about 9 km of the track west of Maldon Junction for re-use on its railway.

== Mooted revival ==
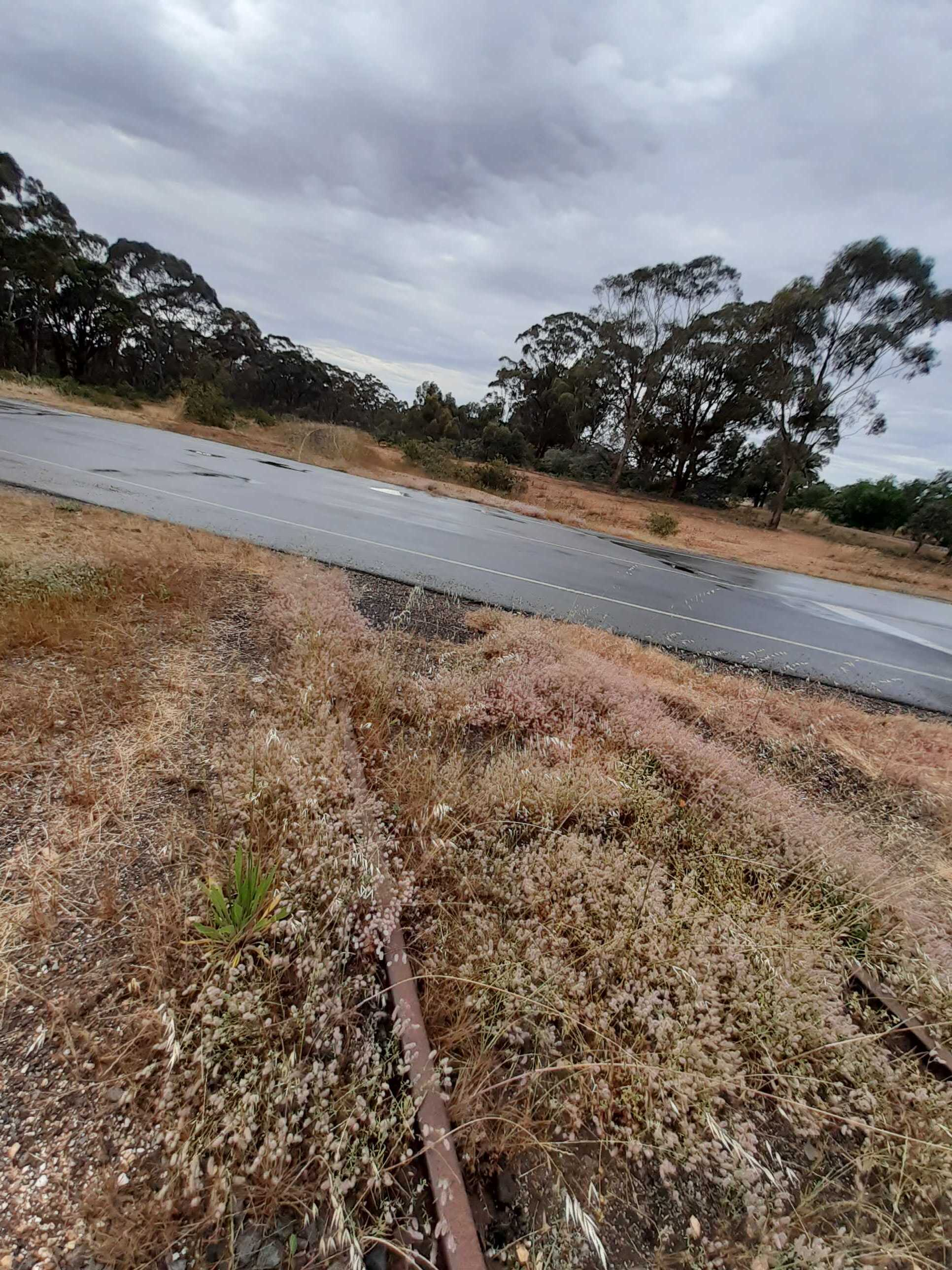
Line is unserviceable at McClure St Level Crossing, Maryborough

One of the policies of the Victorian Coalition government elected in November 2010 was to undertake a study into reintroducing passenger services between Ballarat and Bendigo, which would include running between Maryborough and Castlemaine. A media release in 2011 stated that a review was under way, but nothing further was heard about the plan.

There has been significant discussion on the re-opening of this rail line for passenger services.

== Rail Trail ==
Plans to revive the railway line were not realised. Instead a Castlemaine-Maryborough Rail Trail was proposed, with Victorian State funding of $120,000 for planning of the project announced in June 2022, and a commencement date for construction projected for 2024.
