= Ballarat to Daylesford railway line =

Former railway line in Victoria, Australia

Daylesford to Ballarat

Overview
- Status: Dismantled
- Stations: 10

Service
- Type: V/Line passenger service

History
- Opened: 1887
- Closed: partially 1953 & 1976 completely 1986

The Ballarat–Daylesford railway line was a line constructed by the Victorian Railways, branching from North Creswick railway station, near Ballarat, on the Mildura railway line, extending northeast to Daylesford where it connected to the Daylesford railway line.

The line was opened from North Creswick to Rocky Lead (later Rocklyn) in January 1887, and from Rocky Lead to Daylesford in June 1887. It was closed in sections: from Newlyn to Daylesford in 1953, from Allendale to Newlyn in 1976, and from North Creswick to Allendale in 1986.
