= Woodside, Victoria =

Woodside
- Town
- Coordinates: 38°32′S 146°53′E
- Country: Australia
- State: Victoria
- LGA: Shire of Wellington
- Location: 226 km (140 mi) E of Melbourne; 68 km (42 mi) SE of Traralgon; 22 km (14 mi) E of Yarram

Government
  - State electorate: Gippsland East
  - Federal division: Gippsland
- Elevation: 0 m (0 ft)

Population
  - Total: 364 (2016 census)
- Postcode: 3874
- County: Buln Buln
- Mean max temp: 45 °C (113 °F)
- Mean min temp: −3.5 °C (25.7 °F)
- Annual rainfall: 0 mm (0 in)

Woodside is a town Victoria, Australia. At the 2016 census, Woodside and the surrounding area had a population of 364.

Until its demolition in 2015, the tallest construction of the southern hemisphere, the aerial mast of the VLF Transmitter Woodside, was located near the village. There is also a nearby beach of the same name.

The Woodside railway line connected Woodside with the railhead of Port Albert from 22 June 1923 until 25 May 1953.

An Australian oil and gas company, Woodside Energy, is named after this area.

The Woodside Beach Hotel was reopened in 2022, after many years shut down. It was funded by an 11-person ownership group, headed by local AFL player Josh Dunkley.
