= Woodside railway line =

Former railway line in Victoria, Australia

Woodside

Overview
- Status: Dismantled - now Great Southern Rail Trail to Yarram
- Owner: 1921–1974: Victorian Railways (VR); 1974–1983: VR as VicRail; 1983–1987: STA as V/Line
- Locale: Victoria, Australia
- Termini: Alberton; Woodside
- Continues from: Port Albert line
- Former connections: Port Albert line
- Stations: 6 former stations

Service
- Type: Former Victorian regional service
- Operator(s): 1921–1974: Victorian Railways; 1974–1983: VR as VicRail; 1983–1987: STA as V/Line

History
- Commenced: 8 February 1921
- Opened: 8 February 1921: Alberton to Yarram; 16 December 1921: Yarram to Won Wron; 22 June 1923: Won Wron to Woodside
- Completed: 22 June 1923
- Closed: 26 May 1953: Yarram to Woodside; 26 October 1987: Alberton to Yarram

Technical
- Line length: 35.102 km (21.81 mi)
- Number of tracks: Single track
- Track gauge: 5 ft 3 in (1,600 mm) Victorian broad gauge

The Woodside railway line was a country branch line, in Victoria, Australia. It opened in three stages from 1921 to 1923. Most of the line was closed in 1953, with the remaining section to Yarram continuing in use until 1987.

== History ==
The Woodside line branched off the former South Gippsland line, also known as the Great Southern Railway, at Alberton station. It was one of the last major branch lines constructed in Victoria, and opened in three stages. The first section, from Alberton to Yarram, opened on 8 February 1921, the second, to Won Wron, opened on 16 December 1921, and the third section, to the terminus at Woodside, on 22 June 1923. The line was well-known for its sharp curves and spectacular scenery. It was one of the last in Victoria to have a mixed passenger and goods service.

The branch continued in its initial configuration until 25 May 1953 when it was closed from Yarram to Woodside. The section of the branch to Yarram remained open until 26 October 1987, after which it, and part of the main line, was closed back to Welshpool.

A six-kilometre section of the former branch, from Alberton to Yarram, has become the Tarra Rail Trail.

== Station histories ==
Station	Opened	Closed	Age	Notes
Alberton	13 January 1892 || 26 October 1987 || data-sort-value=34,984 | 95 years			
Yarram	8 February 1921 || 6 June 1981 || data-sort-value=22,033 | 60 years	Passengers		
Yarram	6 June 1981 || 26 October 1987 || data-sort-value=2,333 | 6 years	Goods only		
Devon	16 December 1921 || 26 May 1953 || data-sort-value=11,484 | 31 years			
Calrossie	16 December 1921 || 26 May 1953 || data-sort-value=11,484 | 31 years			
Won Wron	16 December 1921 || 26 May 1953 || data-sort-value=11,484 | 31 years			
Napier	22 June 1923 || 26 May 1953 || data-sort-value=10,931 | 29 years			
Woodside	22 June 1923 || 26 May 1953 || data-sort-value=10,931 | 29 years			

== See also ==
- List of closed regional railway stations in Victoria
- Transportation in Australia
