= Won Wron railway station =

Former railway station in Victoria, Australia

Coordinates: 38°28′22″S 146°43′1″E

Won Wron

General information
- Line: Woodside
- Platforms: 1
- Tracks: 1

Other information
- Status: Closed

History
- Opened: 16 December 1921
- Closed: 25 May 1953

Services
Preceding station	VicRail	Following station
Calrossie towards Spencer Street	South Gippsland line	Napier towards Woodside
Location

Won Wron was a railway station on the Woodside railway line in Victoria, Australia, and opened in December 1921. It closed in May 1953, along with the other stations on the line, apart from Yarram.
