= Koonwarra railway station =

Former railway station in Victoria, Australia

Coordinates: 38°32′49″S 145°56′53″E

Koonwarra

General information
- Line: South Gippsland
- Platforms: 1
- Tracks: 1 (2 till 1988)

Other information
- Status: Closed

History
- Opened: 1892; 134 years ago
- Closed: 6 June 1891; 135 years ago (Stations); 1992; 34 years ago (Line)

Services
Preceding station	VicRail	Following station
Leongatha towards Spencer Street	South Gippsland line	Tarwin towards Yarram
Location

Koonwarra was a railway station on the South Gippsland line, in South Gippsland, Victoria. The station was opened during the 1890s and operated until 1992, when the line to Barry Beach, servicing the oil fields in Bass Strait, was closed. The line was then dismantled and turned into the Great Southern Rail Trail.

Koonwarra became a no-one-in-charge station in 1974.
