= Tarwin railway station =

Former railway station in Victoria, Australia

Coordinates: 38°34′38″S 145°59′00″E

Tarwin

General information
- Line: South Gippsland
- Platforms: 1
- Tracks: 1 (2 till 1970s)

Other information
- Status: Closed

History
- Opened: 1892; 134 years ago
- Closed: 31 July 1976; 50 years ago 1992; 34 years ago (Line)

Services
Preceding station	VicRail	Following station
Koonwarra towards Spencer Street	South Gippsland line	Meeniyan towards Yarram
Location

Tarwin was a railway station on the South Gippsland line in South Gippsland, Victoria. The station was opened during the 1890s, and operated until its closure on 31 July 1976. Prior to its closure, in 1974, it began operating under no-one-in-charge conditions.

All that remains of the station is the platform mound, and a trestle bridge on the down end of the station site, which is now part of the Great Southern Rail Trail.
