= Brataualung people =

The Brataualung were an Indigenous Australian people, one of the five clans of the Kurnai people who live in the Gippsland region of the state of Victoria, Australia.

== Language ==
The Brataualung language was a variety of what is generally classified as Gunai, which itself is classified by Robert M. W. Dixon as Muk-thang. According to Alfred William Howitt, the Brataualung, together with the Braiakaulungl and Tatungalung all spoke dialects of Nulit and Nulit, Muk-thang and the Thangquai spoken by the Krauatungalung were mutually unintelligible.

== Country ==
The Brataualung's traditional territories embraced some 1,900 square miles (4,900 km^{2}), extending eastwards from Cape Liptrap and Tarwin Meadows east to the maritime outlet of the Merriman Creek. Its northern boundary reached inland to Mirboo. It included what are now Port Albert and Wilsons Promontory.

== Social organization ==
The Brataualung were divided into several subgroupings or hordes.

- The Yauung were centred on Warrigal Creek and the Tarra River.

== History of colonisation ==
It is possible that the first contacts may have begun when whaling camps were established in the 1820s, in the vicinity of Wilsons Promontory and Corner Inlet. But the first stable encounters are dated to 1841 when Europeans first began colonising inland Brataualung territory. Relations from the start appear to have been quite amicable, with the Brataualung taking up jobs with settlers in exchange for food and merchandise. In July 1843 relations may have soured when several whites, possibly fugitives from Van Diemen's Land, who had set up shop as traders in grog at Port Albert killed some Brataualung men. The natives retaliated by targeting and killing a prominent local stockholder. The reprisal that followed was severe: local squatters mustered to undertake a vigilante raid that led to substantial loss of life among these tribesmen, and put an end to the apparently amicable relations that had existed to that point in time.

Loss of the lands that furnished them with food, and the impact of ravaging diseases introduced by white settlers led, furthermore, to a drastic loss of life. Five years later, in 1848, it was estimated that they had been reduced to some 50 people, camping in stations along Merrimans Creek, Coady Vale, Erin Vale and Port Albert. To survive they took on jobs, stripping bark from trees and harvesting potatoes on land occupied by squatters'.

The advent of the Victorian gold rush in 1851-2 drained all available white hands from the local economy, and pastoralists designed to offer employment as stockmen, reapers and sheep herders, surprising their employees by the abilities they showed in such tasks. Forging bonds with Braiakaulung men who had also experienced and adapted to the radically changed conditions on their lands, they formed groups that adopted European manners and lifestyles, including playing cards for money, drinking and smoking. (Note: Howitt surmises thus: 'During this time the pressure of our civilisation had broken down the tribal organisation; the white man's vices, which the Kurnai had acquired, had killed off a great number, the remainder had mostly been gathered into the mission-stations, and only a few still wandered over their ancestral hunting-grounds, leading their old lives in some measure' (Howitt 1904, p. 316; Attwood 1987, pp. 42, 44))

Howitt described the passing of the Gippsland tribes in the following terms:

'the tide of settlement' with its 'line of blood', has advanced along an ever-widening line, breaking the native tribes with its first waves overwhelming their wrecks with its flood-. It..will (not) cease until the last tribe has been broken and overwhelmed.'

== Alternative names ==
- Bradowooloong
- Brataua
- Brataualung, Bratanolung
- Nulit
- Tarrawarrachal
- Tarrawarracka

Source: Tindale 1974, p. 203

== Some words ==
- lewin/paiara (tribal messenger)

== Sources ==
- Attwood, Bain (1987). "Tarra Bobby, a Brataualung man". Aboriginal History. 11 (1/2): 41–57. JSTOR 24046868.
- Dixon, R. M. W. (2002). Australian Languages: Their Nature and Development. Cambridge University Press. ISBN 978-0-521-47378-1.
- Fison, Lorimer; Howitt, Alfred William (1880). Kamilaroi and Kurnai (PDF). Melbourne: G Robinson.
- Howitt, Alfred William (1904). The native tribes of south-east Australia (PDF). Macmillan.
- Stephens, Marguerita (2010). White Without Soap: Philanthropy, Caste and Exclusion in Colonial Victoria 1835-1888: a Political Economy of Race. UoM Custom Book Centre. ISBN 978-0-980-75942-6.
- Tindale, Norman Barnett (1974). "Bratauolung (VIC)". Aboriginal Tribes of Australia: Their Terrain, Environmental Controls, Distribution, Limits, and Proper Names. Australian National University Press. ISBN 978-0-708-10741-6.
