= Meeniyan railway station =

Former railway station in Victoria, Australia

Coordinates: 38°34′38″S 146°00′47″E

Meeniyan

General information
- Line: South Gippsland
- Platforms: 1
- Tracks: 2 (3 till 1988)

Other information
- Status: Closed

History
- Opened: 1892; 134 years ago
- Closed: 6 June 1981; 45 years ago (Station); 1992; 34 years ago (Line)

Services
Preceding station	VicRail	Following station
Tarwin towards Spencer Street	South Gippsland line	Stony Creek towards Yarram
Location

Meeniyan was a railway station on the South Gippsland railway line in South Gippsland, Victoria. The station was opened during the 1890s and operated until 1991 when the line to Barry Beach servicing the oil fields in Bass Strait was closed. The line was dismantled and turned into the Great Southern Rail Trail.

The station grounds still retain a Pivot Shed, Goods platform, and the platform mound in reasonable condition, along with a mile marker 88 and a buffer stop in good condition.
