= Gunaikurnai language =

Australian Aboriginal language

Gunaikurnai
- Gaanay
- Kannai, muk-thang
- Region: Gippsland, Victoria, Australia
- Ethnicity: Gunaikurnai (Brabiralung, Braiakaulung, Bratauolung, Krauatungalung, Tatungalung), Bidawal
- Native speakers: 4 (2016 census)
- Language family: Pama–Nyungan: Gippsland; Gunaikurnai
- Dialects: Muk-thang; Nulit; Thangquai; Bidawal

Language codes
- ISO 639-3: unn
- Glottolog: gana1278
- AIATSIS: S68 Gunnai (cover term)
- ELP: Kurnai
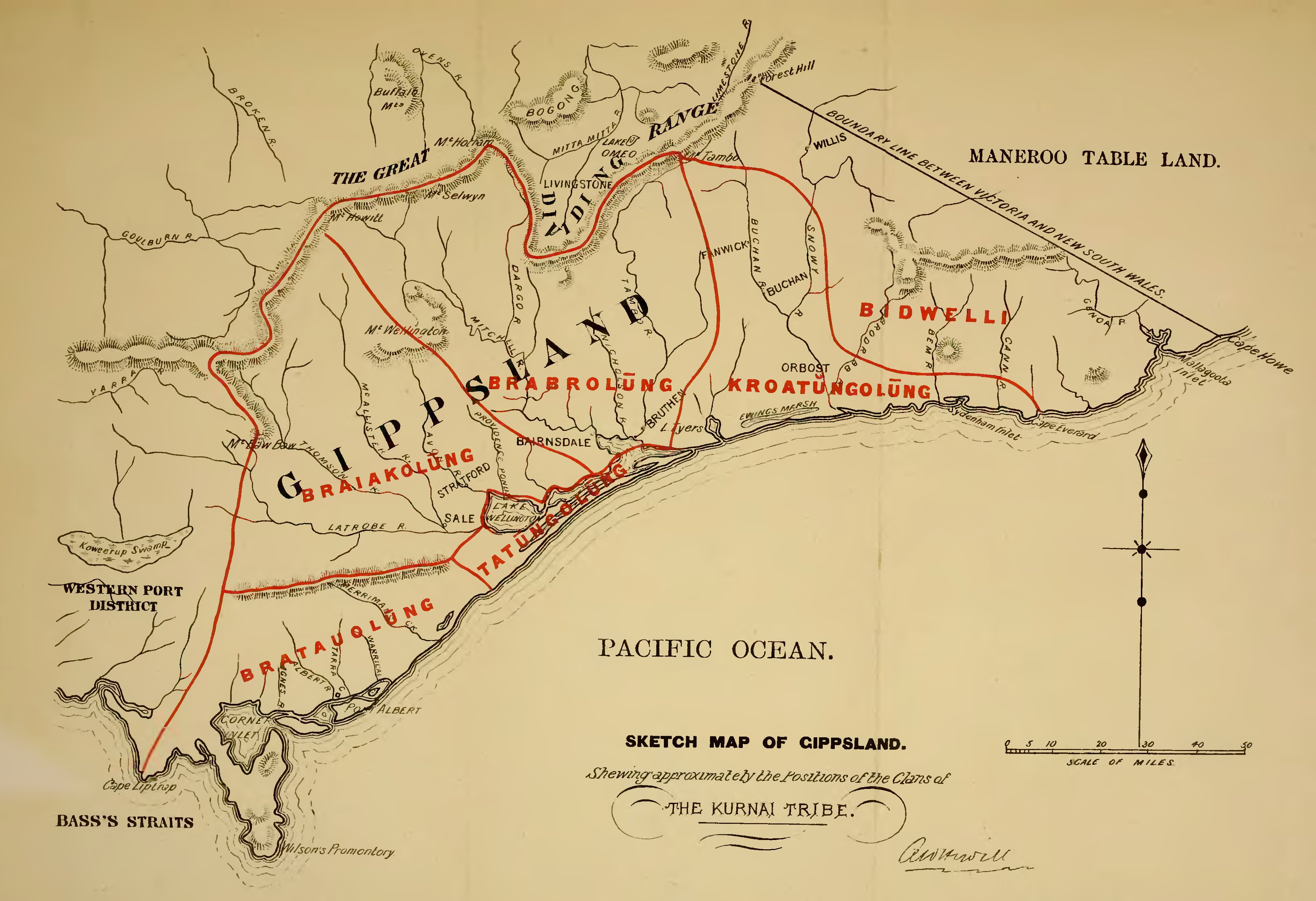
- Sketch map of Gippsland showing approximately the positions of the clans of the Kurnai tribe

The Gunaikurnai or Gunai/Kurnai (/ˈɡʌnaɪkɜːrnaɪ/ GUN-eye-kur-nye) language, also spelt Gunnai, Kurnai, Ganai, Gaanay, or Kurnay /ˈkɜːrnaɪ/ KUR-nye) is an Australian Aboriginal dialect cluster of the Gunaikurnai people in Gippsland in south-east Victoria. Bidawal was either a divergent dialect or a closely related language.

== Varieties ==
Gunai means 'man'. The language had no traditional name, but each of its dialects was referred to separately.

In a 1996 report to the Victorian Aboriginal Corporation for Languages, Clark refers to five Gunaikurnai dialects: Brabralung, Braiakalung, Brataualung, Krauatungalung and Tatungalung.

- Brabralung (Bra = man, lung = belonging to) located in central Gippsland.
- Braiakalung (Bra = Man, ak = west, lung = belonging to) located around Sale through to the mountains.
- Brataualung (men belonging to this place which have fire; Bra = men, Taua or towera = fire, lung = belonging to) located in South Gippsland.
- Krauatungalung (Kraut = east, lung = belonging to) located eastwards to the Snowy River.
- Tatungalung (tat = sea, lung = belonging to) located in the coast area between Lake King and Lake Wellington.

Gunaikurnai dialects have been confused with Muk-thang/Bidawal; there appear to be two distinct languages here, but it is not clear which variety belongs to which, as they both share the name Muk-thang.

== Revival ==
Since the early 1990s, the Victorian Aboriginal Corporation for Languages (VACL) organisation, established the Yirruk-Tinnor Gunnai/Kŭrnai language program which focused on reviving and reclaiming the Gunnai language of Gippsland. Doris Paton, Coordinator of the Program and Lynnette Solomon-Dent, Language worker and consultant are involved in the program. They have been responsible for developing a number of resource materials to support and educate further knowledge of the Gunnai language and Culture. Lynnette Solomon-Dent co-wrote with Christina Eira the VACL Linguist, the Victorian Curriculum and Assessment Authority (VCAA) Aboriginal Languages, cultures and reclamation in Victorian schools: standards P-10 and protocols and were involved in the VCE Revival and Reclamation Study. These teaching documents and resources are collectively used to educate school aged children P-10, VCE, higher learning institutions and the Aboriginal community members, to further their knowledge and allow community members to continue to educate future generations.

Gunaikurnai was featured in a stage performance for the first known time in 2021, when Veronica Gorrie's play Nullung ("paternal grandmother") was presented as a play reading by the Melbourne Theatre Company.

== Phonology ==
Like other Victorian languages, Gunaikurnai allowed initial ⟨l⟩ in its words. However, it also allowed initial ⟨rr⟩, and well as the clusters ⟨gr⟩ (⟨kr⟩) and ⟨br⟩ (⟨pr⟩). This is quite unusual for an Australian language, and the same pattern was found in the Tasmanian languages across Bass Strait.

=== Consonants ===
Consonants
	Labial	Dental	Alveolar	Retroflex	Palatal	Velar
Plosive	p/b	t̪/d̪	t/d	ʈ/ɖ	c/ɟ	k/ɡ
Nasal	m	n̪	n	ɳ	ɲ	ŋ
Rhotic			r			
Lateral			l			
Approximant	w			ɻ	j	

Hercus (1969), states that plosives are conditionally voiced. Fesl also excludes /n̪/ in her thesis but notes that its absence may be due to a lack of data.

=== Vowels ===
Vowels
	Front	Central	Back
High	i		u
Mid	e		o
Low		a	

/e/ and /o/ are said to occur less than /a/, /i/, and /u/.

== Possible placenames ==
A number of placenames in Gunaikurnai country feature the ending -munjie, meaning "place".

Placename	Origin
Boolarra	Thought to mean "plenty".
Briagolong	From the name of the Braiakulung clan.
Buchan	From Bukkan-munjie, meaning "place of the bag".
Croajingolong National Park	From the name of the Krauatungulung clan.
Moe	From the term Mouay meaning "swamp", in reference to the large swamp present before being drained by early European settlers.
Moondarra	"Thunder"
Morwell	Allegedly the anglicised form of the Gunaikurnai words more willie meaning "woolly possum". However, other sources debate this, as the Gunaikurnai word for possum was wadthan, as opposed to wille or wollert in Kulin languages further west.
Traralgon	Origin uncertain. It is popularly believed to be derived from words tarra meaning "river" and algon meaning "little fish". However, these words are not reflected in modern linguists' knowledge of the Gunaikurnai language, where, for example, the word for river is wun wun or wurn wurn. Variations of tarla and gany have been recorded meaning "little" and "fish" respectively.
Wy Yung	Some sources give spoonbill, others a type of duck.
Yallourn	Possibly from a term for "brown fire".
Yarram	Possibly from a term Yarraam Yarraam meaning "plenty of water".
Yinnar	Thought to be from the word for "woman".
