= Great Southern Rail Trail =

Rail trail in Victoria, Australia

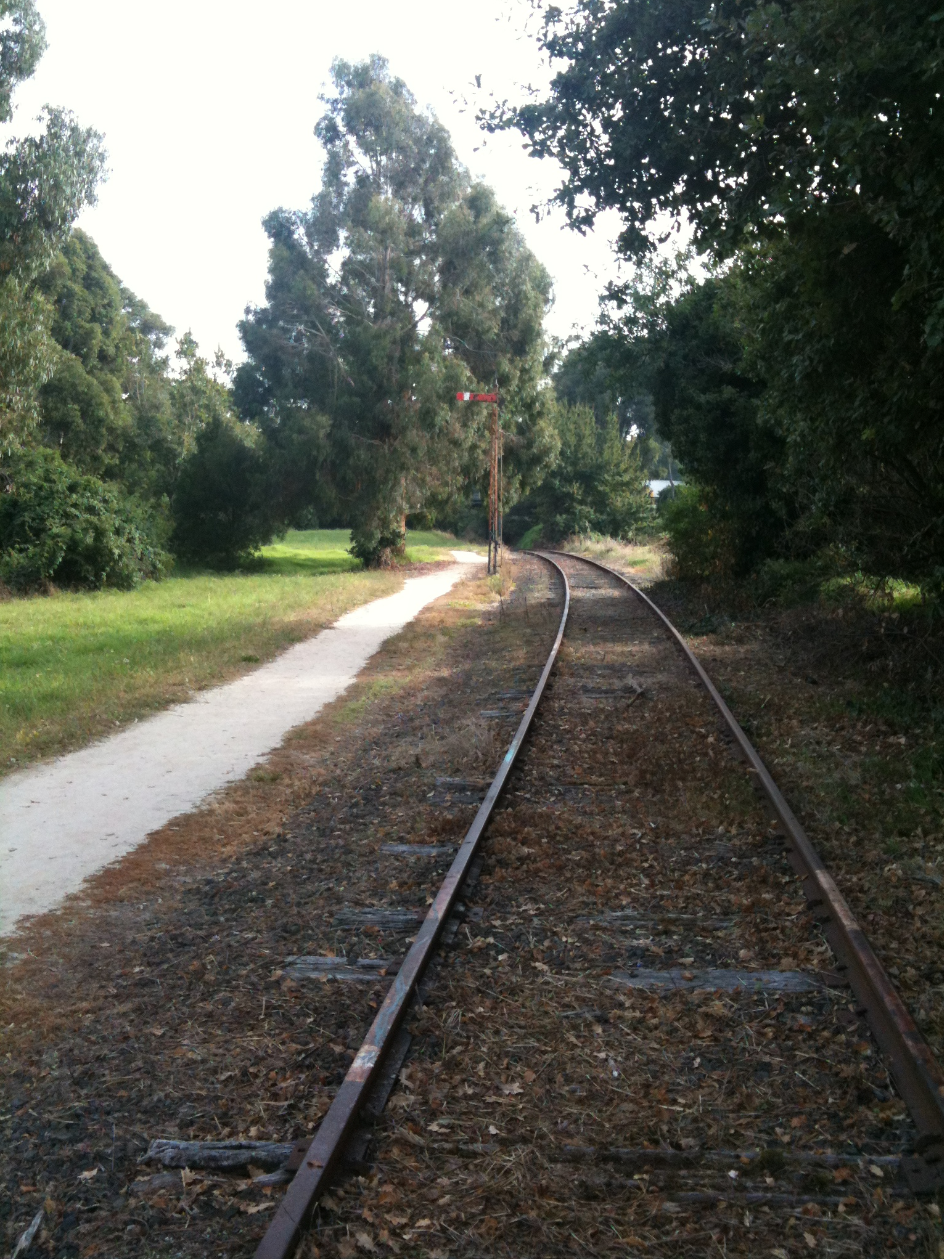
- Great Southern Rail Trail with disused track at Leongatha
- Length: 131 km
- Location: Melbourne, Victoria, Australia
- Established: 2015; 11 years ago
- Difficulty: Easy to medium
- Hazards: Some crossings of major highways
- Surface: Compacted gravel
- Hills: Multiple gentle hills
- Water: Available in most towns
- Train: No regular passenger service
- Bus: Available at Leongatha

The Great Southern Rail Trail is a 131-kilometre rail trail from Yarram to Nyora in South Gippsland, Victoria, Australia. Sections of the trail are flat or gently undulating trail through lush dairy farmland, areas of remnant bush and lowland scrub. There is a big climb on the section between Loch and Leongatha. The section between Fish Creek and Foster climbs past Mount Hoddle and goes through dense forest with occasional magnificent views of Wilsons Promontory and Corner Inlet.

The trail is well maintained with a surface of compacted gravel. Koalas, Wombats, wallabies and Echidnas can often be seen from the trail particularly in the early mornings and evenings.

The 10 km Toora to Welshpool section was opened on 7 February 2015. The section from Koonwarra to Minns road was opened in March 2016, incorporating what had been three very dilapidated wooden trestle bridges and replacing a three-kilometre diversion to the nearby South Gippsland Highway. That made the trail continuous from Leongatha to Welshpool, and users can link to the 6 km pathway to Port Welshpool and its picturesque Long Jetty.

Two trestle bridges north of Loch were surfaced in late 2022 to complete the trail between Nyora and Loch, bringing the total trail length from Nyora to Welshpool to 107 km.

Works to extend the trail from Welshpool to Alberton were completed on 7 June 2024, connecting to the Tarra Rail Trail between Yarram and Port Albert extending the total trail length to 131km from Nyora to Yarram.

== History ==
The original South Gippsland line opened in 1892, joining Dandenong to Port Albert, with branch line to Woodside, Strzelecki, Outtrim and Wonthaggi. The railway was important for the settlement and development of the area, particularly providing transport for forestry and dairy products to Melbourne.

The line was closed to all rail traffic on 30 June 1992, a century after opening, when rail freight services to the Esso Mobil Barry Beach Marine Terminal, situated on Corner Inlet, ceased operation. Almost two weeks prior, on 17 June 1992, superphosphate rail freight services along the line to Buffalo ceased, which was the last 'mixed goods service' in the region and a distinctive feature of the line during its existence.

The line beyond Leongatha, to Yarram and Barry Beach, was dismantled in stages until 14 December 1994, when a V/Line 'rail recovery' train removed the last of the tracks, which were subsequently reused for the Melbourne to Adelaide railway line gauge standardisation project throughout 1995. The same day also saw the closure of the South Gippsland railway line from Nyora to Leongatha, but, two weeks later, that section of the line was reopened by the South Gippsland Railway tourist railway, which operated heritage rail services until December 2015.

The establishment of the South Gippsland Railway, and the electrification of the Cranbourne line in March 1995, thwarted the original plan by the Victorian state government to dismantle the entire line as far back as Cranbourne. The South Gippsland Railway formally ceased operations on 16 January 2016.

== Rail trail route ==
=== Nyora to Leongatha via Korumburra ===
Construction of sections of the trail from Nyora to Leongatha are in progress in 2021.

The following sections were open as at November 2021:

- Trail through Leongatha
- Leongatha to Lows Road
- O’Neills Road to Korumburra
- Trail through Korumburra
- Bena to Loch
- Berrys Road to Nyora

In late 2022 two high trestle bridges north of Loch (over Allsop Creek and the Bass River) were surfaced which completed the trail between Nyora and Loch.

The section from Korumburra to Leongatha was completed in April 2022.

=== Leongatha to Koonwarra (8km) ===
Leongatha is located in the foothills of South Gippsland's Strzelecki Ranges with a population around 5,000. The trail passes through wide-open spaces of lush dairy country before entering teatree and eucalypt bushland near Koonwarra.

=== Koonwarra to Minns Rd (3km) ===
Incorporating a new section of trail covering three old wooden trestle bridges, the path winds its way around hills and over river flats with views of the local area.

=== Minns Rd to Meeniyan (6km) ===
This is a fairly rough section of the track, and there is an old timber bridge alongside the new bridge over the Tarwin River near Meeniyan.

=== Meeniyan to Foster, via Buffalo and Fish Creek (32 km) ===
- Meeniyan to Stony Creek (3.5 km)
- Stony Creek to Buffalo (8 km)
- Buffalo to Fish Creek (8 km)
- Fish Creek to Lowrys Rd (5 km)
- Lowrys Rd to Foster (7.5 km)

This section of the trail has a fine gravel surface and passes through bushland, swamp scrub and lowland forest. There is abundant local wildlife; kangaroos, wallabies and bird life thrive in this area. At the foothills of the Hoddle Range, there are steeper parts of the trail and a number of cuttings and embankments.

The town of Fish Creek has a strong arts scene and options to eat and restock supplies. There is a climb from Fish Creek to Hoddle Summit where there are views over Corner Inlet and Wilsons Promontory from the peak.

Foster is a small regional town but caters well for visitors and there are plenty of accommodation options.

=== Foster to Welshpool (18 km) ===
- Foster to Charity Lane (1 km)
- Charity Lane to Toora (7 km)
- Toora to Welshpool (10 km)

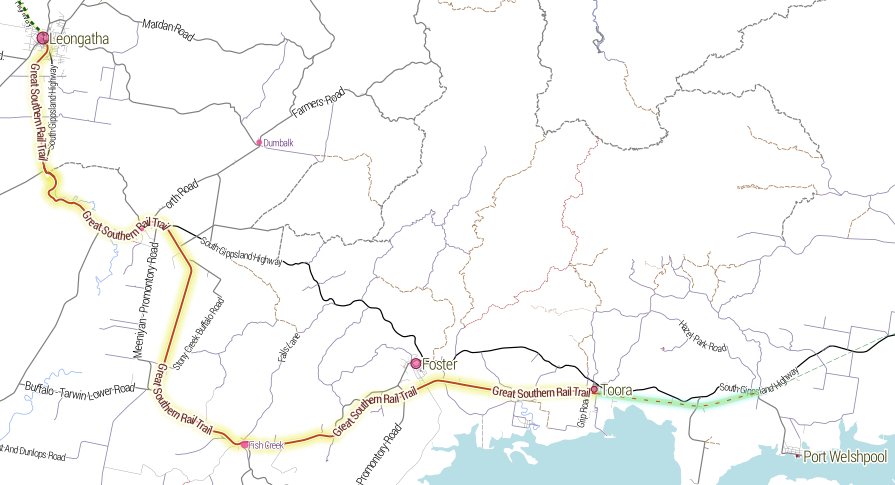
Map of the route, as of August 2013.

=== Welshpool to Port Welshpool connecting trail (5 km) ===
A trail connects Welshpool with Port Welshpool on the coast. The trail is initially an off-road bike path, then joins a quiet unsealed road which follows the alignment of the former horse-drawn Port Welshpool Tramway. Port Welshpool has views of Corner Inlet, Snake Island and the northern section of Wilsons Promontory National Park, and the Port Welshpool Long Jetty.

=== Welshpool to Alberton ===
Funding for the extension of a section of the trail from Welshpool to Alberton was announced on 7 July 2021.

The 21 km extension of the Great Southern Rail Trail between Welshpool and Alberton was declared open on 7 June 2024.

=== Alberton to Yarram and Port Albert ===
Alberton to Yarram is 6 km along the Tarra trail to the north.

Alberton to Port Albert is 7 km along the Port Albert to Alberton trail to the south.

== See also ==
- Bicycle Trails in Victoria
- Rail Trails Australia description
- Route map and trail guide available on Cyclewayz app
- Gippsland's official tourism website - Leongatha
- Gippsland's official tourism website - Foster
- Great Southern Rail Trail - Description and photos
- Bike Paths Victoria sixth edition, 2004. Edited and published by Sabey & Associates Pty Ltd. pp149. ISBN 0-9579591-1-7
- Geographic data related to Great Southern Rail Trail at OpenStreetMap
