= Tarra =

Tarra may refer to:

== People ==
- Tarra Simmons, American politician
- Tarra White (born 1987), Czech actress
- Charley Tarra, Indigenous Australian explorer

== Places ==
- Tarra-Bulga National Park, a national park in Victoria, Australia
- Tarra, Crete (also "Tarrha"), an ancient city of western Crete
- Tarra River (Colombia), a tributary of the Catatumbo River
- Tarra River (Victoria)
- El Tarra, a municipality in Colombia

== See also ==
- Tharros, an ancient city in Sardinia
- Tarras, New Zealand
