= Tatungalung people =

The Tatungalung are an Indigenous Australian people of the state of Victoria. They are often, together with the Bratauolung, Braiakaulung, Brabiralung and Krauatungalung classified as belonging to one nation, the Gunai/Kurnai, though this typology has been thought, by Norman Tindale, to be an artificial construct.

== Name ==
The word tatung means 'south', referring to the fact that they are the southernmost of the Gunai peoples.

== Language ==
The Tatungalung traditionally spoke a dialect that was likely mutually intelligible with the Brataualung and the Braiakaulung, and collectively called Nulit. Robert M. W. Dixon considers Nulit itself to be a dialect of Muk-thang.

== Country ==
Their traditional lands covered an estimated 1,800 square kilometres (700 mi^{2}), running along the coast of Ninety Mile Beach and about Lakes Victoria and Wellington, including a group established on Raymond Island, at King Lake. Their frontiers were at Lakes Entrance to the mouth of Merriman Creek in the west.

== Social organization ==
According to Friedrich Hagenauer the Tatungalung were divided into 4 hordes, though Alfred William Howitt adds a fifth. Tindale suspected that one of the names associated with the tribe, Boul-boul, might refer to one of these hordes.

The clan or horde that lived on Raymond Island, which Howitt says was an enclave - the mainland around the shores of King Lake being Brabiralung ground - was known as the Biinjil-baur, and they asserted a right to exclusive ownership of all of the swans' eggs laid on the site. This notice has drawn the attention of scholars because the concept of property, widely thought absent, appears here to have been asserted as an exclusive title.

== History ==
A tradition relates that, in revenge for killing one of their men, the Brabiralung set up an ambush, using a hill overlooking the island to secretly make preparations.

== Alternative names ==
- Boul-boul
- Nulit (this name was also used of the Bratauolung, and refers to the dialect or language the two tribes spoke)
- Tatoongolong
- Tatung
- Tatunga
- Tirtalawakani
- Tirthung

Source: Tindale 1974, p. 207

== Sources ==
- Bulmer, John (1999). Campbell, Alastair Heriot; Vanderwal, Ron (eds.). John Bulmer's recollections of Victorian Aboriginal life, 1855-1908. Museum Victoria. ISBN 978-0-957-74712-8.
- Dixon, R. M. W. (2002). Australian Languages: Their Nature and Development. Cambridge University Press. ISBN 978-0-521-47378-1.
- Howitt, Alfred William (1904). The native tribes of south-east Australia (PDF). Macmillan.
- Keen, Ian (2010). "The interpretation of Aboriginal 'property' on the Australian colonial frontier". In Keen, Ian (ed.). Indigenous Participation in Australian Economies: Historical and Anthropological Perspectives. Australian National University. pp. 41–62. ISBN 978-1-921-66687-2.
- Tindale, Norman Barnett (1974). "Tatungalung (VIC)". Aboriginal Tribes of Australia: Their Terrain, Environmental Controls, Distribution, Limits, and Proper Names. Australian National University Press. ISBN 978-0-708-10741-6.
