= Napier station =

Napier station may refer to:

- Napier railway station, Victoria, Australia
- Napier railway station, New South Wales, Australia
- Napier railway station, New Zealand
- Napier MRT station, Singapore
