= Bena railway station =

Former railway station in Victoria, Australia

Coordinates: 38°24′42″S 145°45′42″E

Bena

General information
- Line: South Gippsland
- Platforms: 1 (to be reinstated)
- Tracks: 1, (2 till 1994, Bena Loop)

Other information
- Status: Closed

History
- Opened: 2 June 1891; 135 years ago
- Closed: 24 July 1978; 48 years ago

Services
Preceding station	VicRail	Following station
Jeetho towards Spencer Street	South Gippsland line	Whitelaw towards Yarram
Location

Bena was a railway station on the South Gippsland line in South Gippsland, Victoria, Australia. The station was opened during the 1890s, and closed to passenger and parcel traffic on 24 July 1978.

With the realignment of the South Gippsland Highway, the site of the former Bena station is now the location of a "rail over road" bridge.

A longer term South Gippsland Railway project was to include the establishment of a short platform at Bena, for use in conjunction with community events in the township. This comes with the enhancement of community participation within the railway operation, and development of features and attractions on the South Gippsland Railway line.

Prior to its 1978 closure, in March 1976, the platform was shortened from 61m to 23m. The ramped goods platform was also demolished during this time.
