= Whitelaw railway station =

Former railway station in Victoria, Australia

Coordinates: 38°25′28″S 145°47′33″E

Whitelaw

General information
- Line: South Gippsland
- Platforms: 1
- Tracks: 1

Other information
- Status: Closed

History
- Opened: 2 June 1891; 135 years ago
- Closed: c. 1963; 63 years ago

Services
Preceding station	VicRail	Following station
Bena towards Spencer Street	South Gippsland line	Korumburra towards Yarram
Location

Whitelaw was a railway station on the South Gippsland line in Victoria, Australia. The station was opened in June 1891 and was closed during the 1950s, along with the nearby station of Jeetho.

No evidence of the station remains: all buildings, platforms, sidings and other rail infrastructure were removed from the site in the late 1960s, a few years after the station's official closure.
