= Jeetho railway station =

Former railway station in Victoria, Australia

Coordinates: 38°23′55″S 145°44′24″E

Jeetho

General information
- Line: South Gippsland
- Platforms: 1
- Tracks: 1

Other information
- Status: Closed

History
- Opened: 2 June 1891; 135 years ago
- Closed: c. 1963

Services
| Preceding station | VicRail | Following station |
|---|---|---|
| Loch towards Spencer Street | South Gippsland line | Bena towards Yarram |
Location

Jeetho was a railway station on the South Gippsland line in Victoria, Australia. The station was opened in June 1891 and was closed during the 1950s, along with the nearby station of Whitelaw.

No station infrastructure remains at the site of Jeetho. Station Street still exists in the Jeetho township, a gravel and dirt road leading to farm gates, but no longer to the former station.

The station could not be reinstated as part of the former South Gippsland Tourist Railway due to a realignment of the track in the late 1960s, which meant that the former platform site was about 3 metres from the rail line. As well, the Jeetho township is around 2 kilometres from the former station, meaning that there was no local community or attractions for visitors, even if the station had been re-established.
