= Devon station (disambiguation) =

Devon station is a commuter rail station in Devon, Pennsylvania, United States. It could also refer to:

- Devon railway station, a disused train station in Victoria, Australia
- Devon station (Ontario), a train station in Devon, Ontario, Canada
