= Tarra Rail Trail =

Rail trail in Victoria, Australia

Tarra Trail
- Length: 5.6 km
- Location: Melbourne, Victoria, Australia
- Difficulty: Easy
- Hazards: Some crossings of highway and roads
- Surface: Dirt and gravel
- Hills: Multiple gentle hills

The Tarra Rail Trail is a Rail trail from Yarram to Port Albert in South Gippsland, Victoria, Australia. Stage 1 to Alberton was opened in 2011 with further plans to extend the trail to the coast in Port Albert where it will meet up with the future extension of the Great Southern Rail Trail.

== See also ==
- Bicycle Trails in Victoria
