= Tarraville =

- Town
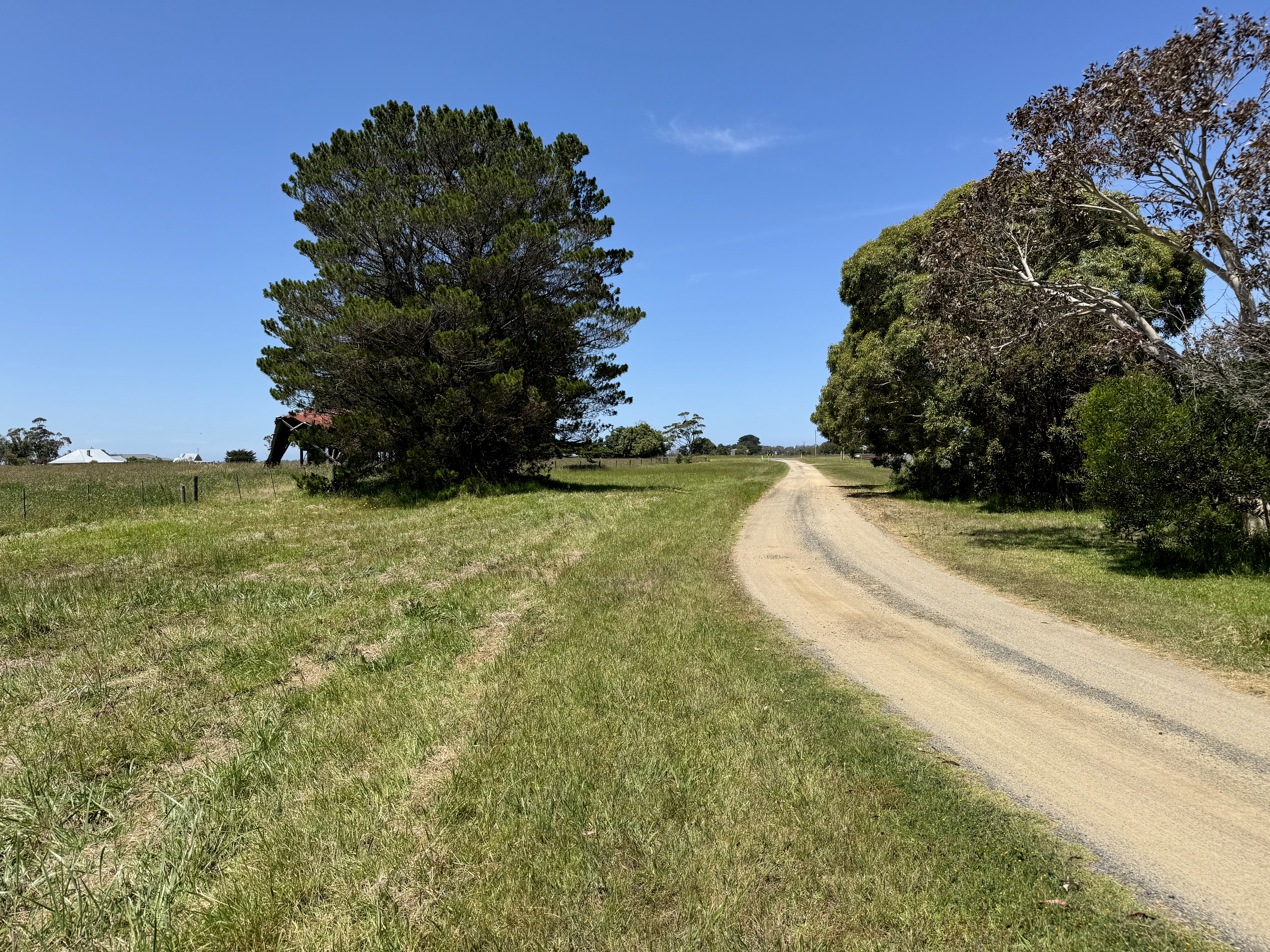
- Stawell Street facing east

- Coordinates: 38.6280°S 146.7205°E
- Country: Australia
- State: Victoria
- Region: Gippsland
- LGA: Shire of Wellington
- Established: 1841

Government
  - State electorate: Victoria

Population
  - Total: 80
- Postcode: 3971

Tarraville is a locality in Gippsland, Victoria, Australia, located near the mouth of the Tarra River and 236 kilometres (147 mi) southeast of Melbourne.

== History ==
Tarraville was established as a village in 1841, when the land was selected as part of the Reeve's Special Survey. Its name comes from the Tarra River, which is named after Charley Tarra, an Aboriginal who travelled with Paweł Strzelecki when he explored Gippsland. The wreckage of the PS Clonmel was an influence on the founding of Tarraville. Because Tarraville was founded on a path to Port Albert, it grew quickly, containing about 50 buildings at the end of 1844. In 1851, it became a government township, after having been a private township since 1843.

In the 1850s, when people travelled from Port Albert to fields in Omeo when gold had been discovered there, Tarraville was used as a stopping point. At this time, it was the largest town in Gippsland, containing many buildings, including multiple businesses and seven hotels. In 1850, a private school opened in the town, but closed in 1852. In 1856, a public school opened, and in 1859, a mechanics' institute hall was built. A tollgate was built at the entrance to Tarraville in 1860.

Tarraville's population and activity decreased in the late 1870s, after a railway was built going from Melbourne to Sale. Few buildings were left in Tarraville by the early 1900s. In 1903, most of the edges of the town were sea and the only public buildings left were a hotel, a school, three churches, a library, and a mechanics' institute. The school closed in 1988. Currently, Tarraville's Anglican Church is the only remaining public building aside from the closed school. The town in the present era has been described by The Sydney Morning Herald as a "sleepy town" and "little of importance".

According to a book by the United States Government Publishing Office in 1920, one could travel from the town to Port Albert using a coach and to Melbourne using a railway.

== Population ==
The census of 1851 revealed the population of the town to be 219. It increased to 227 in 1871, but decreased to 150 in 1911. The population dropped further to 105 in 1947 and grew slightly to 125 in 1961. In the 2016 census, the total population was 80, and 53.2% of people were male and 46.8% female. There were about 20 families, an average of 0.4 children per family, and a median age of 51. Households were 66, with an average of 1.8 people per household.

== Church ==
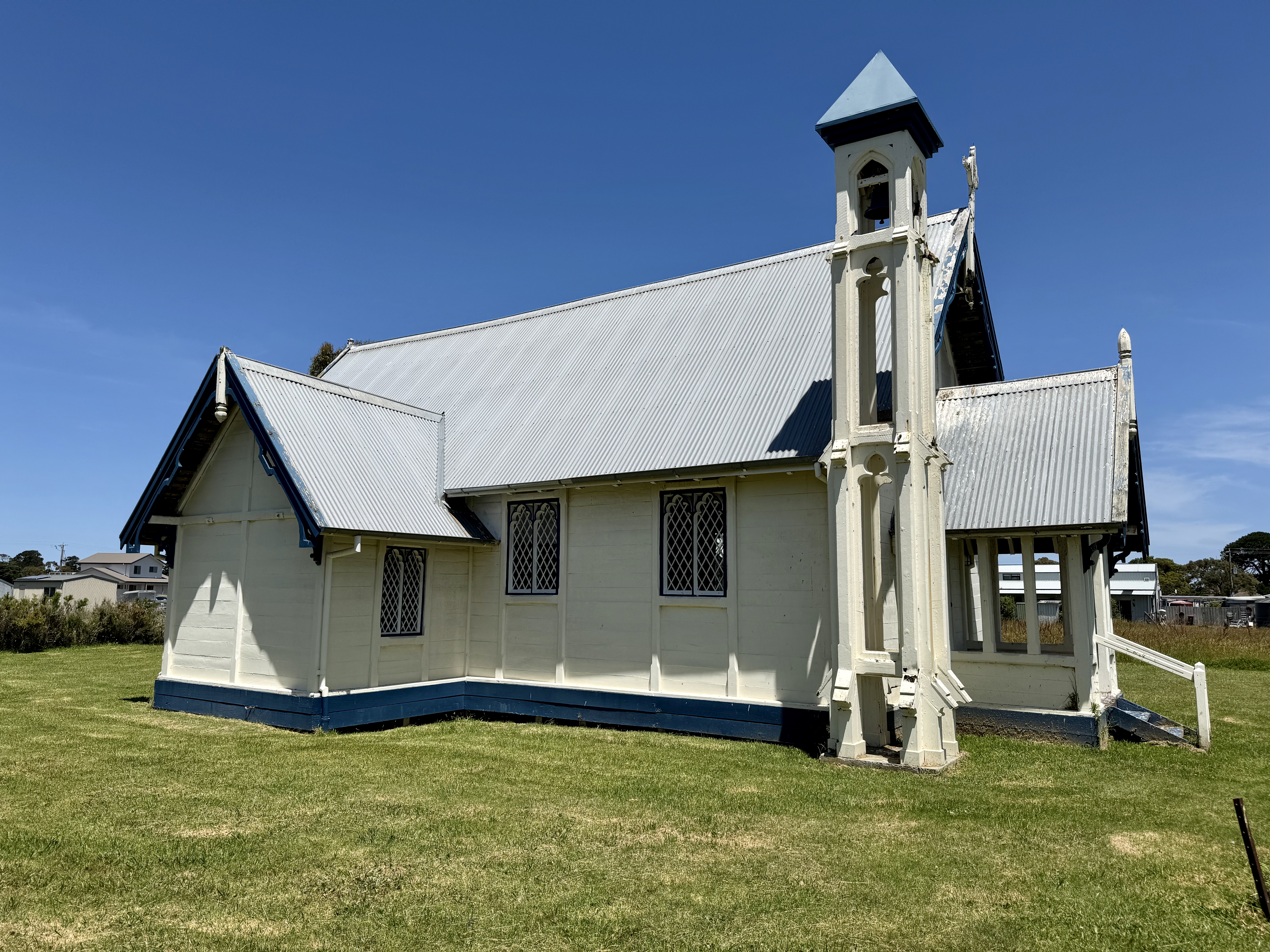
Christ Church in 2025.

Tarraville contains an Anglican church, built by J. H. W. Pettit and George Hastings in 1856. Constructed of wood, the church has been painted blue and cream. It has attracted attention from visitors, due to being the second oldest timber building in Victoria and the oldest church in Gippsland. As of 2011, the church only provides limited services, but traditionally holds the Good Friday service for the region.
