= Boys railway station =

Former railway station in Victoria, Australia

Coordinates: 38°41′7″S 146°3′22″E

Boys

General information
- Line: South Gippsland
- Platforms: 1
- Tracks: 1

Other information
- Status: Closed

History
- Opened: 13 January 1892; 134 years ago
- Closed: 16 March 1953; 73 years ago 30 June 1992; 34 years ago(line)

Services
Preceding station	VicRail	Following station
Buffalo towards Spencer Street	South Gippsland line	Fish Creek towards Yarram
Location

Boys was a station on the South Gippsland railway line in Victoria, and opened with the South Gippsland line in January 1892. It was one of the first stations on the line to be closed, which occurred in March 1953. The name of station was derived from "Boys Road", which crossed the line at that point.
