= Buffalo railway station =

Former railway station in Victoria, Australia

Coordinates: 38°39′14″S 146°01′41″E

Buffalo

General information
- Line: South Gippsland
- Platforms: 1
- Tracks: 2

Other information
- Status: Closed

History
- Opened: 1892; 134 years ago
- Closed: 6 June 1981; 45 years ago (Station); 1992; 34 years ago (Line)

Services
Preceding station	VicRail	Following station
Stony Creek towards Spencer Street	South Gippsland line	Boys towards Yarram
Location

Buffalo (originally called Buffalo Creek) was a railway station on the South Gippsland railway line in South Gippsland, Victoria. The station was opened during the 1890s and operated until 1981 when the line to Barry Beach servicing the oil fields in Bass Strait was closed. The line was then dismantled and turned into the Great Southern Rail Trail. All that remains at Buffalo is a Pivot Shed, platform mound and a buffer stop. The line to Barry Beach was later dismantled in 1994 and turned into the Great Southern Rail Trail, to Foster.
