= Tarra River (Victoria) =

Tarra
- Location of the Perry River mouth in Victoria
- Etymology: In honour of Charley Tarra.
- Native name: Blindit'yin (Kurnai)

Location
- Country: Australia
- State: Victoria
- Region: South East Coastal Plain (IBRA), South Gippsland
- Local government area: Shire of Wellington

Physical characteristics
- Source: Strzelecki Ranges
  - location: near Womerah
  - coordinates: 37°27′16″S 146°32′30″E
  - elevation: 238 m (781 ft)
- Mouth: Corner Inlet, then Bass Strait
  - location: east of Port Albert
  - coordinates: 38°39′42″S 146°43′7″E
  - elevation: 0 m (0 ft)
- Length: 56 km (35 mi)

Basin features
- River system: West Gippsland catchment
- Tributaries
  - left: Bodman Creek

The Tarra River is a perennial river of the West Gippsland catchment, in the South Gippsland region of the Australian state of Victoria.

== Location and features ==
The Tarra River rises on the southern slopes of the Strzelecki Ranges, near Womerah, on the southwestern boundary of the Tarra-Bulga National Park, and flows in a highly meandering course generally east then south, joined by one minor tributary before reaching its mouth within the Corner Inlet, east of Port Albert, and emptying into Bass Strait. The river descends 238 metres (781 ft) over its 56-kilometre (35 mi) course.

The river is traversed by the South Gippsland Highway between Yarram and Greenmount.

== Etymology ==
In the Aboriginal Braiakaulung language the name for the river is Blindit'yin, meaning "platypus".

The river was named in honour of Charley Tarra, a Gippsland Company Aboriginal guide.

== See also ==
- List of rivers of Australia § Victoria
