= Alberton railway station =

Alberton railway station may refer to:

- Alberton railway station, Adelaide
- Alberton railway station, Victoria
