= Tarras (disambiguation) =

Tarras may refer to:

- Tarras, New Zealand
- Elisabeth Tarras-Wahlberg (born 1950)
- Walter Scott, Earl of Tarras (1644-1693), nobleman
- Dave Tarras (1895-1989), musician

== See also ==
- Tarra (disambiguation)
