= Stony Creek railway station =

Former railway station in Victoria, Australia

Coordinates: 38°35′17″S 146°02′17″E

Stony Creek

General information
- Line: South Gippsland
- Platforms: 1
- Tracks: 1

Other information
- Status: Closed

History
- Opened: 1892; 134 years ago
- Closed: 1963; 63 years ago? 1992; 34 years ago (Line)

Services
Preceding station	VicRail	Following station
Meeniyan towards Spencer Street	South Gippsland line	Buffalo towards Yarram
Location

Stony Creek was a railway station on the South Gippsland railway line in South Gippsland, Victoria. The station was opened during the 1890s and operated until the 1970s. The line was closed in 1991 and turned into the Great Southern Rail Trail.
