= VLF Transmitter Woodside =

Demolished transmission tower near Woodside, Victoria, Australia

Woodside Omega Mast

General information
- Status: Demolished
- Type: Guyed grounded mast equipped with umbrella antenna
- Location: Woodside, Australia
- Coordinates: 38°28′52″S 146°56′7″E
- Completed: 1982
- Destroyed: 22 April 2015

Height
- Height: 432 m (1,417 ft)

Design and construction
- Architect: US Coast Guard/Australian Department of Transport
- Main contractor: Electric Power Transmission Pty Ltd

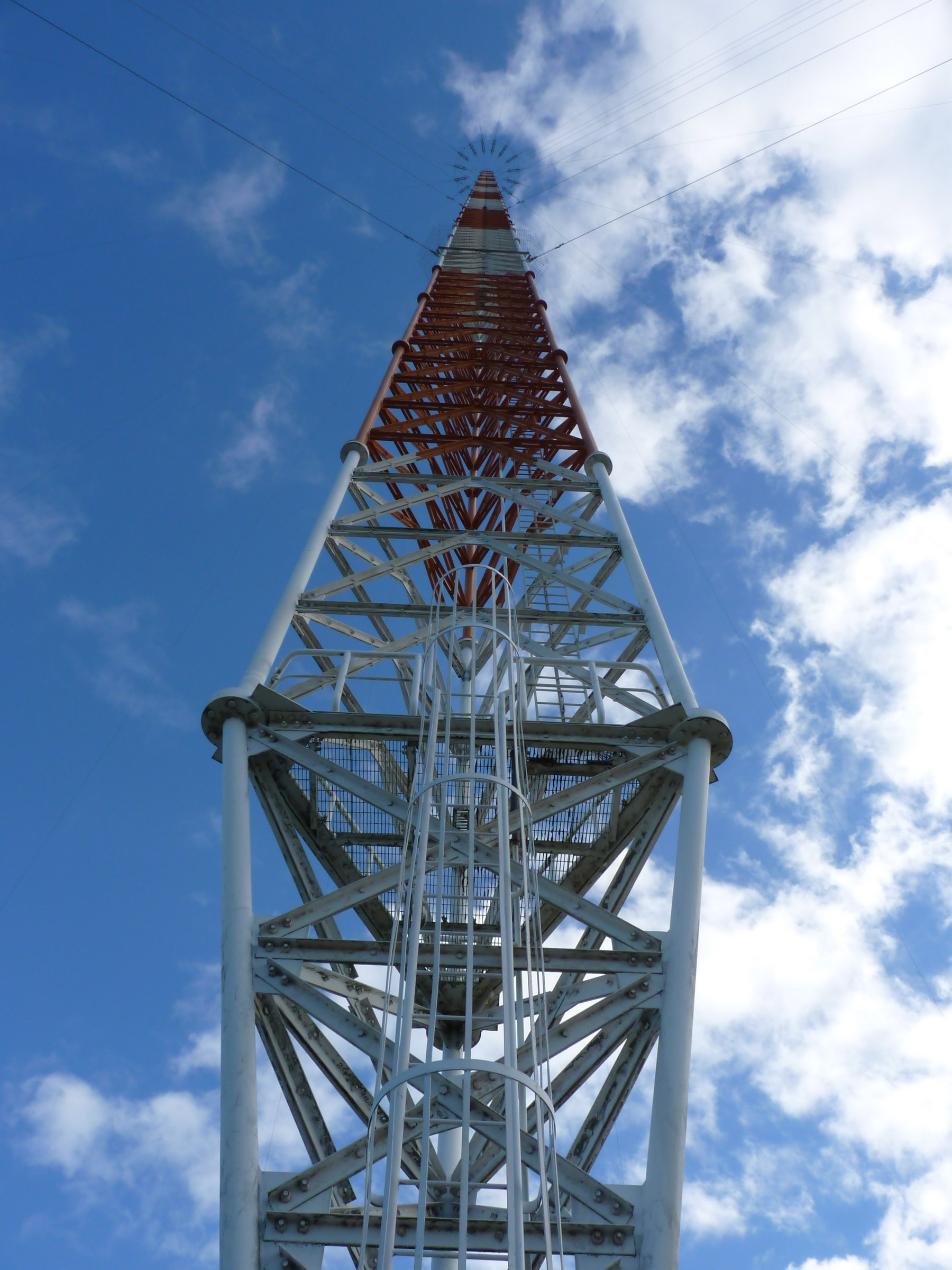
VLF Transmitter Woodside

Woodside Omega Transmitter near Woodside, Victoria, Australia, was a transmission tower that was completed in 1982 and demolished in 2015. Until its demolition, it was the tallest object in the Southern Hemisphere.

== History ==
In 1977, The United States and Australian governments agreed to establish an OMEGA navigation system in south-eastern Australia. The agreement was extended in 1995, to 30 September 1997.

Station G was an Omega transmitter that used an umbrella antenna carried by a 432 metres (1,417 ft) tall grounded lattice steel guyed mast. Unlike many of the other Omega Transmitters, Woodside was not a "hot tower," that is, one which is insulated from a ground connection by large ceramic insulators that support the entire weight of the structure. Rather, the tower was electrically insulated from the topmost guys which served as the radiators, similar to the metal radials of an umbrella without cloth covering. The mast simply supported the downward sloping guy wires which are the active elements. The guy wires were also used to hold the tower itself in place. This mast was the tallest structure in the southern hemisphere. Construction of this station was originally planned to be built in New Zealand but after protests from anti-war protestors it was built in Australia, although not without controversy. The tower was officially opened in October 1982, but had been operating for 3 months prior to that, with the first broadcast at 10am on the 16th of August, having taken 3.5 years to construct, however the tower itself having taken only 30 days to be constructed.

After the shutdown of the OMEGA navigation system on 30 September 1997, the station was used as a transmitter for uni-directional communications to submarines on 13 kHz under the callsign VL3DEF until 2004. Until December 2008, it had been transmitting a 100 baud MSK modulated signal on 18.6 kHz.

== Current status ==
The station was decommissioned in November 2008. Aircraft warning lights continued to operate on each of the 10 43m platforms, although some of the lights had stopped working.

On 25 January 2014, a BASE jumper was killed during an attempt to parachute from the tower. It was demolished by explosives on 22 April 2015.

Transmission equipment from the Omega navigation system is now on display at the Port Albert Maritime Museum.

== See also ==
- List of masts
