= Charley Tarra =

Indigenous Australian explorer

Charley Tarra (c.1815 – 1847), also known as Charlie Tarra, was an Indigenous Australian from the Burra Burra clan of the Gandangara people, who became famous for his role in the expedition of Paweł Strzelecki into the Australian Alps and Gippsland in 1840. His skill in guiding and obtaining food was considered to have saved the exploring party from starvation.

Tarra later continued to assist in the exploration and surveying of Gippsland for the colonists, with several landmarks in the region subsequently being named after him.

== Early life ==
Tarra was born around 1815 into the Burra Burra clan of the Gandangara people in the vicinity of what is now the town of Taralga in New South Wales. At the time of his childhood, British colonists had begun to explore and obtain large grants of land in his home country. In 1822, James Macarthur, fourth son of the powerful and wealthy colonist John Macarthur, acquired a large grant of land in the region and established a cattle and sheep property. In the following years, he expanded his estate which he called 'Richlands' to cover most of the lands of the Burra Burra people. The young Tarra subsequently became a servant of the Macarthur family.

== Guide for the expedition of Paweł Strzelecki ==
In 1839, close associates of James Macarthur started to report upon a promising and as yet uncolonised part of the south-east Australian continent that was located across the Australian Alps. Macarthur decided to organise an expedition from his 'Richlands' estate to investigate this "new" area, later known as Gippsland, for its potential as grazing land.

Macarthur formed a group which included himself, a man named James Riley, three convicts and two Aboriginal guides which included Charley Tarra and a man named Jackey. They set out from 'Richlands' in early 1840 heading south. At Yass, the group met up with the Polish explorer Paweł Strzelecki who happened to be in Australia on a scientific excursion. Strzelecki was invited to join and take leadership of the expedition, which he did with enthusiasm.

The expedition travelled south into the Australian Alps. In March 1840, they approached the highest peaks of the continent and Strzelecki, alone, climbed the tallest and named it Mount Kosciuszko after Tadeusz Kościuszko, a Polish hero. After a few days rest they continued south through Omeo and along the Tambo River into Gippsland where they found high quality grazing land cultivated by the Gunai people.

They then headed west toward Western Port through trackless forest guided by Tarra. The journey became arduous through wet, dense scrub and their supplies of food became perilous. Tarra, in addition to guiding the group through the forest, was able to keep his fellow expeditioners alive by finding drinkable water and by hunting and capturing koalas and other marsupials for food. In May 1840, they reached a pastoral property at Western Port in a very fatigued condition. They later travelled to Melbourne where they received a grand welcome, with Tarra being acknowledged as saving the expedition from disaster.

== Further expeditions through Gippsland ==
Later in 1840, Tarra left Melbourne on an expedition to Gippsland through the forest in order to recover the horses that they had to leave behind on their initial journey.

In February 1841, he was employed by a group of entrepreneurial colonists called the Gippsland Company to travel by sea and act as guide to establish a port in Gippsland. After founding Port Albert, representatives of the company with Tarra as their guide explored the Gippsland area, naming various landmarks such as Lake Wellington and Tarra River.

In 1842, he accompanied William Adams Brodribb on a coastal expedition from Port Albert to Western Port. On this journey, Tarra was again able to provide food for his fellow expeditioners and also maintained good relations with local Aboriginal people by helping perform scarification initiation rites on them.

== Death and legacy ==
Charley Tarra died at 'Richlands' in 1847 from tuberculosis. He was buried at the estate and a monument was dedicated to him in Taralga.

A number of places in Gippsland are named after him including the Tarra River, Tarraville and the Tarra-Bulga National Park.

In 2009, a poem was written about him by the Polish poet, Adam Fiala.

== See also ==
- List of Indigenous Australian historical figures
