= Fish Creek, Victoria =

Fish Creek
- Town
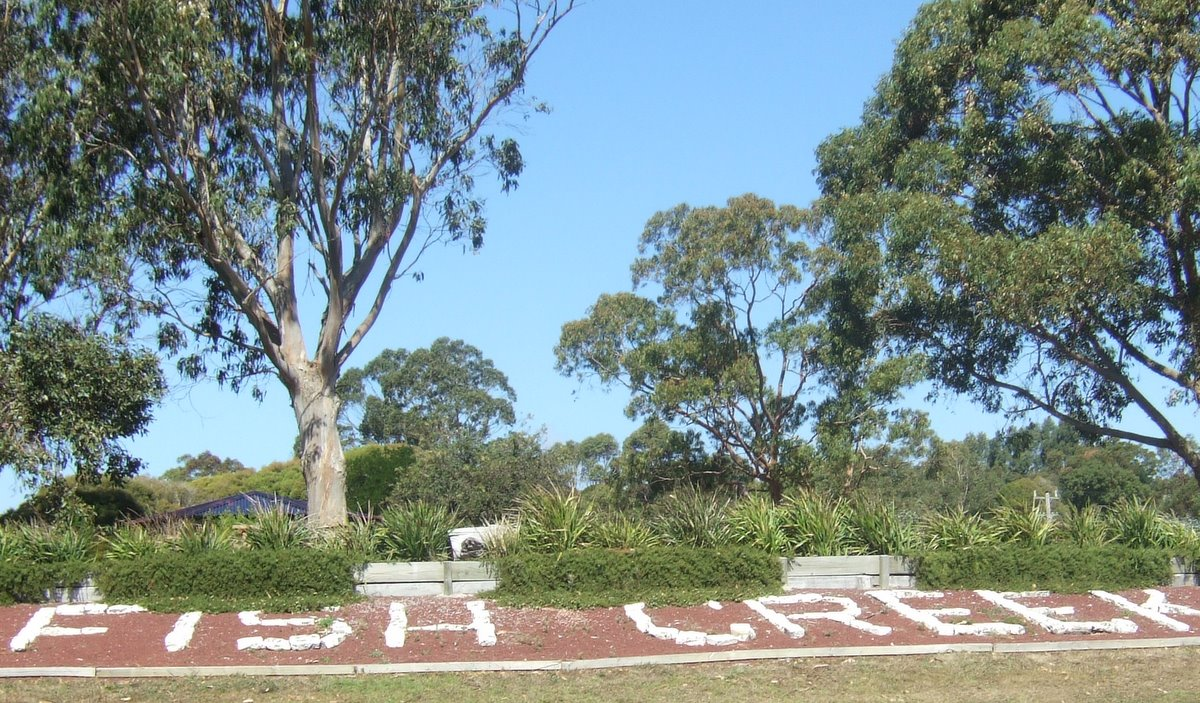
- Sign

- Coordinates: 38°41′S 146°05′E
- Country: Australia
- State: Victoria
- LGA: South Gippsland Shire
- Location: 169 km (105 mi) SE of Melbourne; 35 km (22 mi) SE of Leongatha; 14 km (8.7 mi) SW of Foster

Government
  - State electorate: Gippsland South
  - Federal division: Monash

Population
  - Total: 827 (2016 census)
- Postcode: 3959
- Mean max temp: 19.4 °C (66.9 °F)
- Mean min temp: 9.3 °C (48.7 °F)
- Annual rainfall: 847 mm (33.3 in)

Fish Creek is a small dairy farming community in Gippsland, Victoria, Australia. It sits in between the Boon wurrung and Gunai/Kurnai Indigenous regions. At the 2016 census, Fish Creek and the surrounding area had a population of 827. It was named for the many river blackfish in the creek that runs alongside the town.

== History ==
Fish Creek was first settled in 1886 when land was selected and cleared in the densely forested region, soon after, dairy cattle began grazing. The Post Office opened on 6 October 1890 next to the proposed railway which arrived in 1892. In 1900 a community hall was built where the Butter Factory building stands today. This hall was used as a church by everyone until in 1904 when a new Catholic church was built. Not long after that the Union Church was opened and since then the town has had two churches. Also in 1900, a creamery was established as a cooperative of the growing number of dairy farmers in the region, this soon became the Fish Creek Butter Factory. Pigs were commonly raised alongside dairy and sold to a bacon factory at Dandenong.

After World War I, around 50 veterans were allotted land around Fish Creek as part of the Federal Government's Soldier Settlement Scheme, however most were unable to make a success of farming. In the 1920s and '30s, Fish Creek saw a large influx of Italian immigrants who settled in the region permanently.

In 1939, the iconic Fish Creek Hotel was built to replace the timber building that had burnt down that January. Despite the shortage of building materials as Australia prepared for war, the building was finished by October.

By the 1950s many Dutch farmers had settled in Fish Creek.

In 1967, the Fish Creek butter factory closed down as milk was taken from farms by bulk tanker to larger factories, mainly the Murray Goulburn factory in Leongatha.

The Great South Gippsland Railway line closed to passengers in 1993 for all stations past Leongatha. However freight and goods traffic continued until the line was formally closed in 1994. The tracks were removed and a combined bike, pedestrian and horse riding track, known as The Great Southern Rail Trail, was established along the former rail line.

== The town today ==
The Fish Creek Memorial Hall was built in 1930. The hall is used as a venue for parties, funerals, church services, film screenings, markets and school concerts. The hall also houses an op shop, and its profits partially fund the maintenance and enhancement of the hall facilities.

=== Fish Creek Tea Cosy Festival ===
The Fish Creek Tea Cosy Festival was founded in 2011 by Deidre Granger and runs biennially, attended by 6,759 people in 2024. Tea cosies are displayed in competitive categories in the Memorial Hall. Music, film, gallery exhibitions, and other events, such as High Tea at the Bowls Club feature in and around the town, bringing significant income to the community. In 2022, Fish Creek residents broke the Guinness World Record for the largest tea cosy while attempting to raise money to assist those impacted by floods in New South Wales.

=== Sports ===
The town has an Australian Rules football team competing in the Mid Gippsland Football League. The Fish Creek Football Netball Club (Kangaroos) are based at Terrill Park, the club rooms are one of the very few club rooms that are privately owned. The club is over 130 years old and has had a few players who have gone on to play AFL.

Fish Creek FC won the 1913 and 1919 South Gippsland Shire Football Association premiership.

=== Landmarks ===
The town is home to the Big Mullet which lies on its side atop the Fish Creek Hotel.

== See also ==
- Fish Creek railway station
- Great Southern Rail Trail

== Sources ==
- Visit Victoria tourism website
- Prom Country tourism website
- Tea Cosy Festival History
- South Gippsland Shire Event of the Year Nominees 2025

== Gallery ==
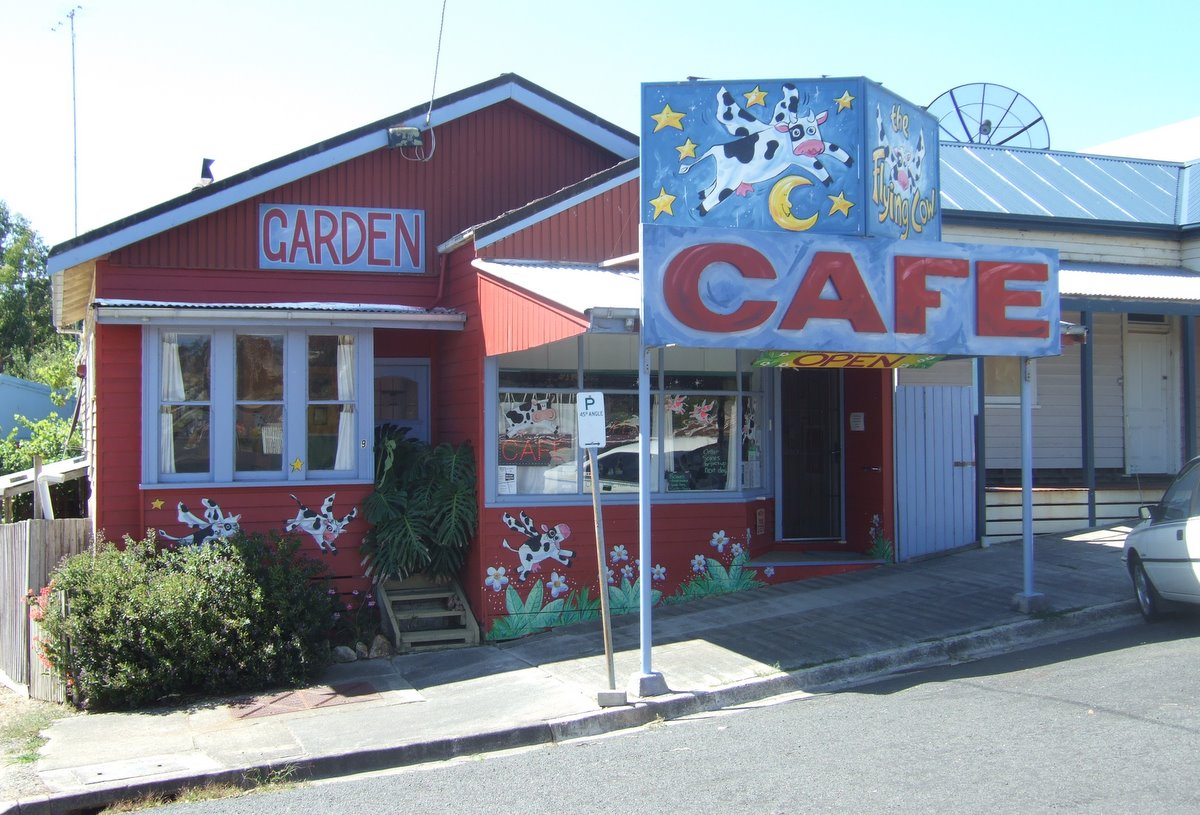

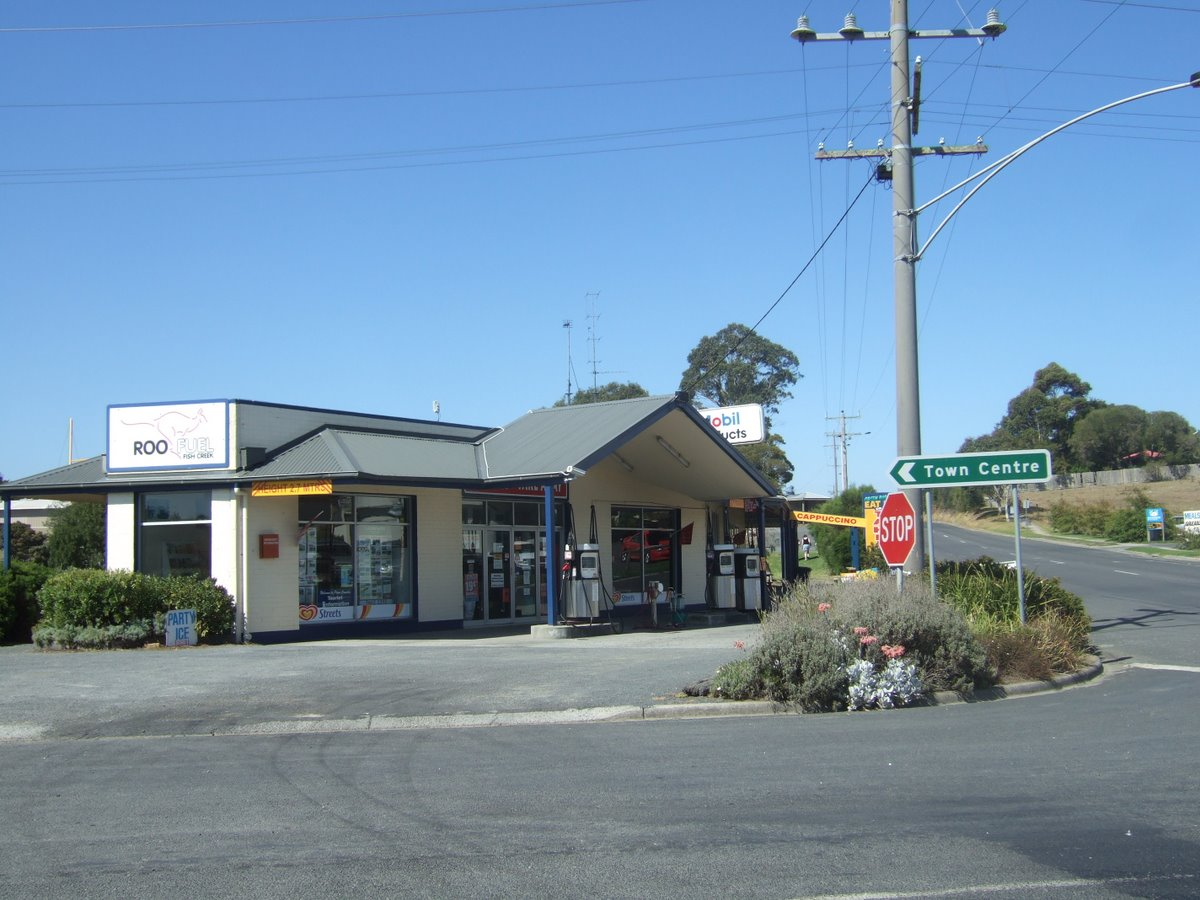
