= Napier railway station =

Former railway station in Victoria, Australia

Coordinates: 38°29′54″S 146°49′35″E

Napier

General information
- Line: Woodside
- Platforms: 1
- Tracks: 1

Other information
- Status: Closed

History
- Opened: 22 June 1923
- Closed: 25 May 1953

Services
Preceding station	VicRail	Following station
Won Wron towards Spencer Street	South Gippsland line	Woodside Terminus
Location

Napier was a railway station on the Woodside railway line in Victoria, Australia, and opened in June 1923. It closed in May 1953, along with the other stations on the line, apart from Yarram.
