= Devon railway station =

Former railway station in Victoria, Australia

Coordinates: 38°31′25″S 146°39′36″E

Devon

General information
- Line: Woodside
- Platforms: 1
- Tracks: 1

Other information
- Status: Closed

History
- Opened: 16 December 1921
- Closed: 25 May 1953

Services
Preceding station	VicRail	Following station
Yarram towards Spencer Street	South Gippsland line	Calrossie towards Woodside
Location

Devon was a railway station on the Woodside railway line in Victoria, Australia, and opened in December 1921. It closed in May 1953, along with the other stations on the line, apart from Yarram.
