= Stony Creek, Victoria =

Stony Creek
- Town
- Coordinates: 38°35′S 146°09′E
- Country: Australia
- State: Victoria
- LGA: South Gippsland Shire

Government
  - State electorate: Gippsland South
  - Federal division: Monash

Population
  - Total: 281 (2016 census)
- Postcode: 3957

Stony Creek is a town in the Shire of South Gippsland, Victoria, Australia, located roughly between Meeniyan and Foster. At the 2016 census, it had a population of 281.

== History ==
The post office opened on 23 May 1892 after a settlement was established on the arrival of the railway.

== Stony Creek today ==
Stony Creek has a horse racing club, the Stony Creek Racing Club, which schedules around seven race meetings a year including the Stony Creek Cup meeting in March.

It also has a go-kart circuit located next to the race track on the highway.

Stony Creek has an Australian Rules football team, the Stony Creek Football Netball Club, nicknamed "The Lions", competing in the Alberton Football League. The club colours are maroon and white. The club's last senior premiership came in 2009 when Stony Creek defeated Wonthaggi Power in the seniors.

== See also ==
- Stony Creek railway station, Victoria
