= Brabiralung =

Indigenous Australian people

The Brabiralung are an Indigenous Australian people, one of the five clans of Gippsland, in the state of Victoria, Australia, belonging to a wider regional grouping known as the Kurnai.

== Name ==
The name Brabiralung is thought to derive from the reduplication of their word for man, namely "bra". Thus doubled, it gives the sense of 'manly.' The suffix -(g)alung denotes 'of' or 'belonging to'.

== Language ==
The Brabiralung language is a dialect of Gunai.

== Country ==
The Brabiralung tribal lands extended over an estimated 6,200 square kilometres (2,400 mi^{2}) of territory embracing Mitchell, Nicholson, and Tambo rivers. Its southern borders ran as far south as the area around Bairnsdale and Bruthen. Their western borders ran west of the Mitchell to Providence Ponds and along the edges of the Gippsland Lakes.

== People ==
A Brabiralung man, Tulaba, who later became an important informant for one of the founding fathers of Australian ethnography. (Note: He was given a nickname, Taenjill', meaning 'incessant talker'. He also had a comfortably familiarity with English (Mulvaney 2005)) He generally stayed clear of missions such as those at Lake Tyers and Ramahyuck missions, the reserves where many remnants of the Victorian tribes were herded into. He encountered Alfred William Howitt near Bairnsdale around 1866 when the latter established a hops farm, and was engaged as overseer for the indigenous hops pickers employed there. In his two employers, the MacLeods and Howitt, Tulaba found people who either did not meddle in native ways, or positively encouraged their retention, and Howitt assumed a tribal kinship role in his relationship with Tulaba, overcoming the latter's reluctance to have him observe the initiation rites, and placing them in a (jerra-eil) relationship.) The information Tulaba provided in exchange for food and clothing, using a match-stick system Howitt deployed (Note: The method had been previously devised by a Methodist minister, Edward Fuller, a Primitive Methodist missionary, for working with the indigenous people on Fraser Island (Gardner & McConvell 2015, p. 133).) to delineate genealogical structures, played a seminal function in Howitt's thinking about the aboriginal kinship systems. Tulaba died due to cancer at the Lake Tyers Mission in 1886 and was buried according to Anglican rites.

== Alternative names ==
- Brabirrawulung, Brabriwoolong
- Brabrolong
- Brabrolung
- Bundah Wark Kani (i.e., kanai = man)
- Bundhul Wark Kani (horde name)
- Muk-thang (language name), (Note: kani here reflects the word kanai, signifying man (Tindale 1974, p. 203))
- Wakeruk
- Sasa baka

== Sources ==
- Attwood, Bain (1987). "Tarra Bobby, a Brataualung man" (PDF). Aboriginal History. 11: 41–57.
- Clark, Ian D. (1996). A Report to the Victorian Aboriginal Corporation For Languages. Victorian Aboriginal Corporation – via ResearchGate.
- Fison, Lorimer; Howitt, Alfred William (1880). Kamilaroi and Kurnai (PDF). Melbourne: G Robinson – via Internet Archive.
- Gardner, Helen; McConvell, Patrick (2015). Southern Anthropology - a History of Fison and Howitt's Kamilaroi and Kurnai. Springer. ISBN 978-1-137-46381-4.
- Howitt, Alfred William (1904). The native tribes of south-east Australia (PDF). Macmillan.
- Mulvaney, D. J. (2005). "Tulaba (1832–1886)". Australian Dictionary of Biography, Supplementary Volume. Melbourne University Press.
- Tindale, Norman Barnett (1974). "Brabiralung (VIC)". Aboriginal Tribes of Australia: Their Terrain, Environmental Controls, Distribution, Limits, and Proper Names. Australian National University Press. ISBN 978-0-708-10741-6.
- Wesson, Sue Caroline (2002). The Aborigines of Eastern Victoria and Far-South Eastern New South Wales, 1830 to 1910 (PDF). Melbourne University dissertation.
