= Alberton railway station, Victoria =

Former railway station in Victoria, Australia

Coordinates: 38°36′33″S 146°39′57″E

Alberton

General information
- Line: South Gippsland
- Platforms: 1
- Tracks: 3

Other information
- Status: closed

History
- Opened: 1892; 134 years ago
- Closed: 6 June 1981; 45 years ago (Station); 1987; 39 years ago (Line)

Services
Preceding station	VicRail	Following station
Gelliondale towards Spencer Street	South Gippsland line	Yarram Terminus
Gelliondale towards Spencer Street	South Gippsland line	Port Albert Terminus
Location

Alberton was a railway station on the South Gippsland railway line, which originally terminated at Port Albert in South Gippsland, Victoria. The station was opened on 13 January 1892, and closed on 6 June 1981. Alberton was the junction for the extension of the South Gippsland railway line to Woodside in the early 1920s. The line between Alberton and Port Albert closed in the 1940s.
