= Kara Moana Healey =

Kara Moana Healey

Kara Moana Elizabeth Healey (23 June 1904 – 10 June 2006) was a field collector, conservationist, preservationist and naturalist and the first female National Park Ranger in Victoria, Australia.

She was born Kara Moana Elizabeth Vernon in Kawhia, New Zealand.

Kara Moana was named after a Maori nurse present at Kara’s birth; it is said to mean “Rippling Waters.”

Kara's parents, William John Vernon (a Boiler Maker) and Mary Vernon (née Dunstone), were Australians working in New Zealand on a saw mill project. In 1906, they moved back to Australia and settled in Mysia, north-west of Bendigo.

== Early life ==
After finishing high school she became a teacher's assistant at Stuart Mill State School near St Arnaud, Victoria until she met and married William Stanley McGreevy (known as Stan) in 1925. They divorced in 1946.

In 1948 she married Jim Healey, the caretaker at Tarra Valley National Park; he died in 1952.

== Tarra-Bulga National Park ==
Healey was appointed the Park Ranger at Tarra Valley National Park now Tarra-Bulga National Park where she collected specimens for identification for the National Herbarium for ten years. By 1961 she had collected over 160 specimens. Two new types of fungi were named after her: Poria healeyi, a previously unidentified fungus causing yellow straw rot in Mountain Ash, and Lambertella healeyi, a fungus growing on another fungus. She collected a total of over 500 specimens including animals and 80 species of moss.

While at Tarra Valley National Park, Kara lived on a 40-acre property not far from and above the Park boundary. The property was a dairy farm originally owned and operated by Jim Healey. On the property was a house constructed of split palings and lined with hessian; in some rooms, old newspapers dating back to the turn of the century were used as wall coverings. The property has since been donated to National Parks and is now part of Tarra Bulga National Park. The house has now succumbed to the advances of the forest, and very little remains to evidence its occupation.

== Scientific contribution ==
Neville Walters, a scientist at the CSIRO, described Healey's contributions as "easily the best" of the 150 or more collectors Australia wide, and said "She knew every lyrebird in the park as well as many of the pilot birds, Crimson Rosellas and yellow robins." Healey also contributed specimens to the National Museum of Victoria, the University of Melbourne and the National Herbarium.

Whilst collecting, Kara created pencil sketches and pastel drawings of the specimens. She also took numerous photos of fungi, ferns, and other plants thriving within the park. Insects, spiders, and other small animals were also collected and kept in display cases. Kara's collections and displays have since been donated to Parks Victoria.

== Retirement and life final stages ==
In 1963, Healey married Tom McKean, a widower; he died in 1986.

In 1995 she became a resident of the Heytesbury Lodge nursing home at Cobden.

She was awarded a certificate of merit for outstanding support by the Save the Children Australia.

Her 100th birthday, at Timboon was attended by over 100 friends and family.

She died 13 days before her 102nd birthday.

== Commemoration at the centenary of Tarra-Bulga National Park ==
Kara Healey commemorative plaque

In 2007 a special ceremony was held at Tarra Valley Park, now part of Tarra-Bulga National Park, as part of the centennial celebrations, to unveil a special tribute to the first woman park ranger and the contribution she made to the understanding of the ecology of the valley known as Tarra Valley.

== Notes ==
- Newspaper article:- Sunday Pioneer, Lucknow. India. Article - Mistress of the Lyrebird.13 September 1953. written by John Loughlin. Courtesy- Australian High Commissioners Office. New Delhi
- Book:- Discover Historic Gippsland. Written by Mary Ryllis Clark
- Alberton Shire Council Meeting transcript:
