= Alberton, Victoria =

Alberton
- Town
- Coordinates: 38°37′S 146°40′E
- Country: Australia
- State: Victoria
- LGA: Shire of Wellington
- Location: 228 km (142 mi) SE of Melbourne; 65 km (40 mi) S of Traralgon; 6 km (3.7 mi) S of Yarram

Government
  - State electorate: Gippsland South
  - Federal division: Gippsland

Population
  - Total: 297 (SAL 2021)
- Postcode: 3971

Alberton (Gunai: Lurt-bit) is a town in Victoria, Australia. It is located along the South Gippsland Highway, 7 kilometres south of Yarram and 216 kilometres east of Melbourne. Albert River passes through the town. At the 2021 census, Alberton had a population of 297.

The township was surveyed in 1842 and named after Prince Albert, the husband of Queen Victoria. Initially the township consisted of two settlements, one named Alberton and the other named Victoria, which were separated by Victoria Street (renamed Brewery Road in 1847).

Alberton Post Office opened on 10 January 1856. An earlier Alberton office opened in 1842 was renamed Port Albert some days earlier.

The town's population grew steadily. Stores, hotels, and churches were built, as well as the Police Magistrate and Court of Petty Sessions. By the 1880s the town's growth stagnated. The announcement of a new railway line increased growth, with new houses and factories being built. Shire Offices were planned for the town, but in 1897 the location was changed to nearby Yarram. This led to many businesses moving to Yarram, and by 1921 the railway had been extended there.

Today, Alberton is a small cattle grazing community. There is also a primary school which was built in 1858 and celebrated its 150th anniversary in 2008. The Victoria Hotel, built in 1889, still stands.
