= Yarram =

- Town
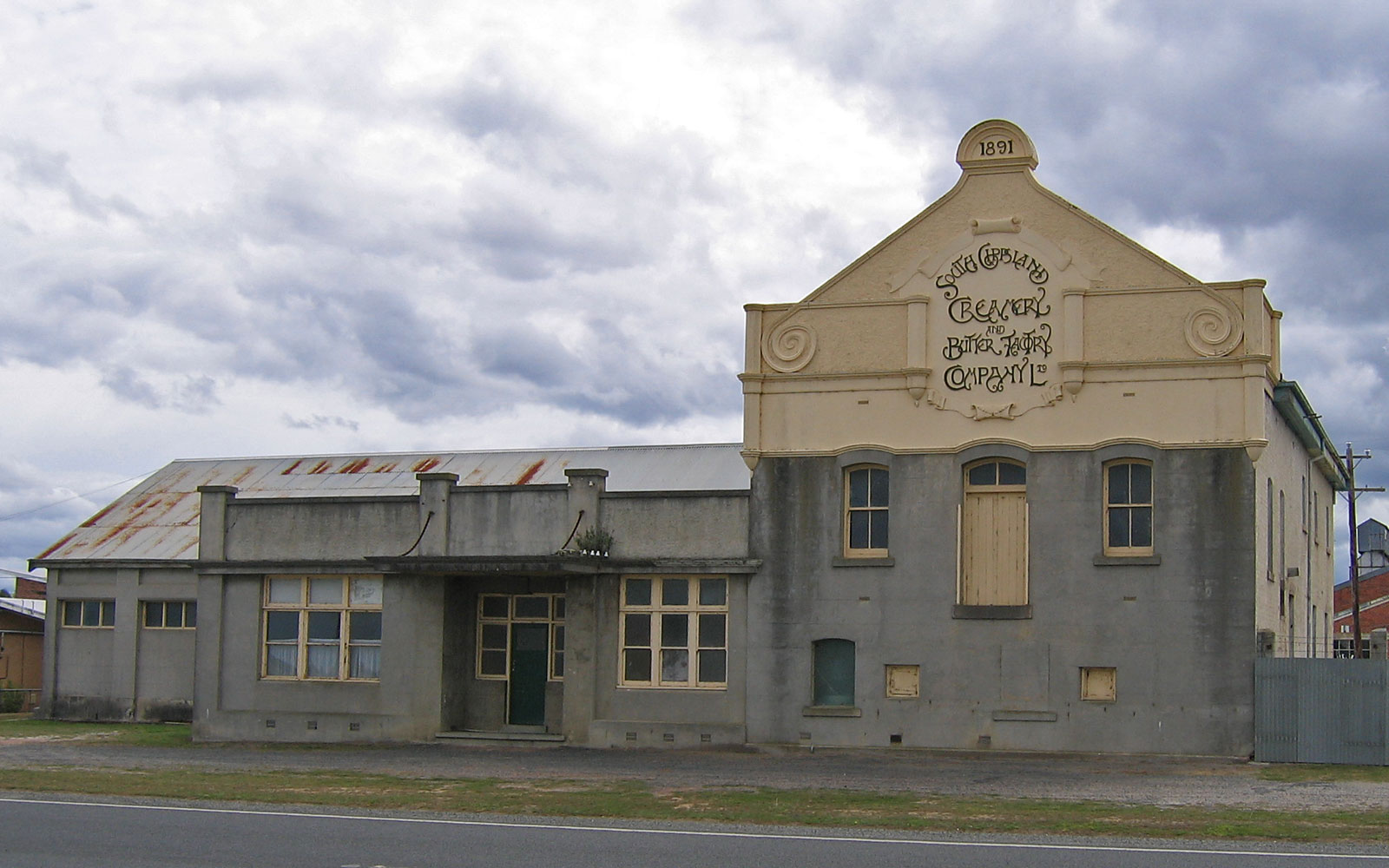
- The historic South Gippsland Creamery and Butter Factory

- Coordinates: 38°33′S 146°40′E
- Country: Australia
- State: Victoria
- LGA: Shire of Wellington
- Location: 221 km (137 mi) E of Melbourne; 59 km (37 mi) S of Traralgon; 72 km (45 mi) SW of Sale

Government
  - State electorate: Gippsland South
  - Federal division: Gippsland
- Elevation: 18 m (59 ft)

Population
  - Total: 2,135 (2016 census)
- Postcode: 3971
- Mean max temp: 20.0 °C (68.0 °F)
- Mean min temp: 8.5 °C (47.3 °F)
- Annual rainfall: 627.5 mm (24.70 in)

Yarram (formerly Yarram Yarram) is a town in the Shire of Wellington, Victoria, Australia, located in the southeast of Gippsland. At the 2016 census, the population of the town was 2,135. Nearby towns include Welshpool, Alberton and Foster.

== Etymology ==
The term 'Yarram Yarram' is thought to be an Aboriginal phrase meaning 'plenty of water,' however it is not known which language group the name is taken from.

== History ==
The traditional custodians of the land surrounding Yarram are the Brataualung people of the Kurnai People, an Australian Aboriginal group, who resisted the invasion of their lands, and sustained heavy casualties as a result.

Due to its proximity to Port Albert, one of Victoria's first trade ports, the town grew quickly after settlement. This was as a result of its location in one of Australia's primary dairy-making regions alongside the presence of the timber industry. In 1841 the site, originally a low-lying swamp, was chosen by a Scottish clan leader, Aeneas Ronaldson MacDonnell, who, with his fellow Scots, attempted to set up a feudal-style court. However, the experiment folded and he subsequently moved to New Zealand.

The post office opened on 1 February 1861 as Yarram Yarram and was renamed Yarram in about 1925. The railway arrived in 1921; the line between Welshpool and Leongatha was closed in October 1987.

The Yarram Magistrates' Court closed on 1 January 1990.

Mr and Mrs A.J Thompson, publicans and property developers local to Yarram, built the Regent Theatre and its two shops. The project was the last 'picture palace' of its time to be built in Gippsland and cost a total of 20,000 pounds. Today, this amount would be approximately $36,444 Australian dollars.

Notable people from Yarram include 19th century opera singer Ada Crossely, who was born in Tarraville and received piano lessons with Mrs Hastings of the nearby Port Albert at the age of seven, and Kara Healey, a naturalist who was the first female park ranger in Victoria. She discovered two types of fungi (Poria Healeyi and Lambertella Healeyi), both of which were named after her.

== Today ==
Yarram is known for its proximity to Ninety Mile Beach, Port Albert, neighbouring Tarra-Bulga National Park and heritage architecture in its Main Street, including the historic Regent Theatre.

== Geography ==
=== Climate ===
Yarram experiences an oceanic climate (Köppen: Cfb) with tepid summers and cool winters. The wettest recorded day was 24 March 2021 with 118.4 mm (4.66 in) of rainfall. Extreme temperatures ranged from 46.0 °C (114.8 °F) on 7 February 2009 to −5.2 °C (22.6 °F) on 22 July 2017.

Climate data for Yarram Airport (38.56°S 146.75°E) (18 m (59 ft) AMSL) (2007-2025)
Month	Jan	Feb	Mar	Apr	May	Jun	Jul	Aug	Sep	Oct	Nov	Dec	Year
Record high °C (°F)	45.7 (114.3)	46.0 (114.8)	40.5 (104.9)	33.0 (91.4)	27.9 (82.2)	21.5 (70.7)	22.9 (73.2)	24.4 (75.9)	30.7 (87.3)	35.9 (96.6)	40.4 (104.7)	44.0 (111.2)	46.0 (114.8)
Mean daily maximum °C (°F)	25.7 (78.3)	25.0 (77.0)	23.8 (74.8)	20.4 (68.7)	17.4 (63.3)	14.9 (58.8)	14.5 (58.1)	15.3 (59.5)	17.5 (63.5)	19.7 (67.5)	21.7 (71.1)	23.5 (74.3)	20.0 (67.9)
Mean daily minimum °C (°F)	13.2 (55.8)	13.0 (55.4)	11.7 (53.1)	9.1 (48.4)	6.5 (43.7)	4.6 (40.3)	4.5 (40.1)	4.8 (40.6)	6.2 (43.2)	7.6 (45.7)	9.7 (49.5)	11.3 (52.3)	8.5 (47.3)
Record low °C (°F)	2.7 (36.9)	3.9 (39.0)	2.3 (36.1)	0.3 (32.5)	−3.0 (26.6)	−4.0 (24.8)	−5.2 (22.6)	−3.7 (25.3)	−2.4 (27.7)	−1.0 (30.2)	−0.2 (31.6)	1.7 (35.1)	−5.2 (22.6)
Average precipitation mm (inches)	47.5 (1.87)	41.0 (1.61)	52.4 (2.06)	51.7 (2.04)	45.7 (1.80)	57.8 (2.28)	47.8 (1.88)	48.9 (1.93)	47.3 (1.86)	55.9 (2.20)	75.2 (2.96)	54.7 (2.15)	627.5 (24.70)
Average precipitation days (≥ 0.2 mm)	9.2	9.4	10.3	13.4	14.4	14.3	15.3	15.7	15.4	12.8	13.4	11.6	155.2
Source: Bureau of Meteorology (2007-2025)

== Culture ==
Yarram hosts an annual eisteddfod every August showcasing music, speech and drama.

== Sport ==
The town has an Australian Rules football team by the name of the Yarram Demons (established in 1887) who are competing in the North Gippsland Football League. Yarram is the home of several former AFL footballers, including Royce Vardy, Anthony Banik (Richmond Tigers), Andrew Dunkley (Sydney Swans), Jed Lamb (Carlton Blues), Nathan Vardy (West Coast Eagles) and Kyle Dunkley (Melbourne Demons. Current AFL player Josh Dunkley plays for the Brisbane Lions.

Golfers play at the course of the Yarram Golf Club on Old Sale Road.

== Education ==
The town has a secondary college (Yarram Secondary College), a public primary school (Yarram Primary School) and a Catholic primary school (St Mary's Primary School).

== Gallery ==
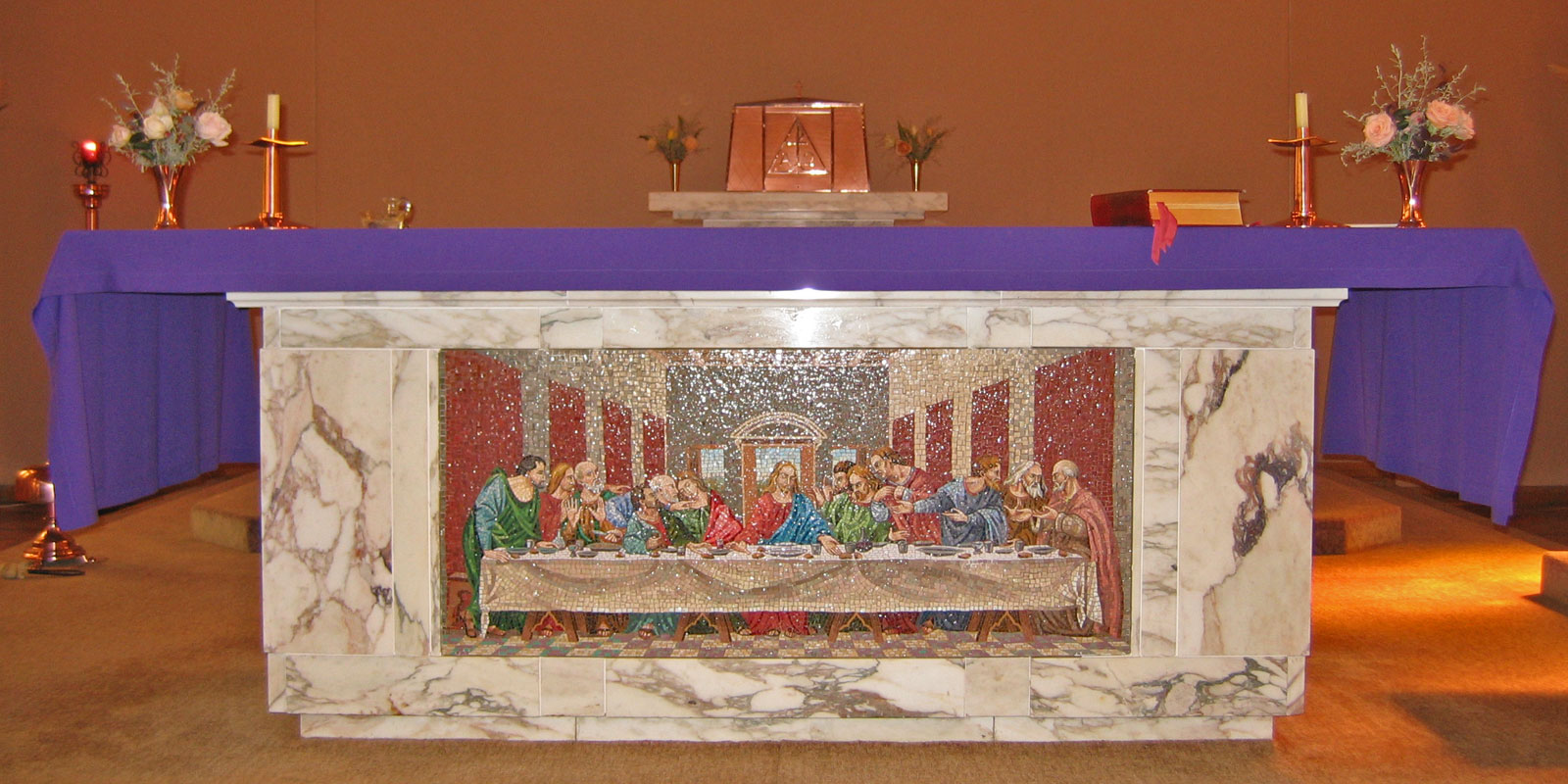
Last Supper mosaic on the altar of the Catholic Church, Yarram.

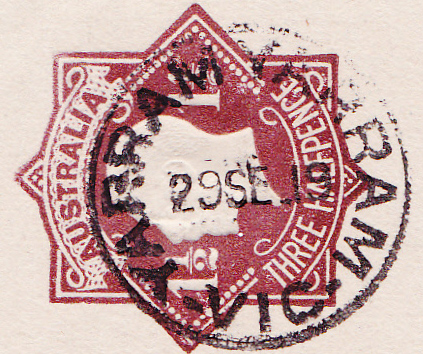
1919 Yarram Yarram postmark.

== See also ==
- Yarram railway station
- List of reduplicated Australian place names
