= Port Albert railway station =

Former railway station in Victoria, Australia

Coordinates: 38°40′20″S 146°41′36″E

Port Albert

General information
- Line: South Gippsland

Other information
- Status: Demolished

History
- Opened: 13 January 1892; 134 years ago
- Closed: 14 February 1949; 77 years ago (last regular service)

Services
Preceding station	VicRail	Following station
Alberton towards Spencer Street	South Gippsland line	Terminus
Location

Port Albert was the original terminus station on the South Gippsland railway line, the railway opening to that station on 13 January 1892.

Early survey documents regard the station site as "Palmerston" station ground.

The last advertised trolley service ran on 14 February 1949.
