= Braiakaulung people =

Indigenous people of Victoria, Australia

The Braiakaulung are an Indigenous Australian people, one of the five tribes of the Gunai/Kurnai nation, in the state of Victoria, Australia. They were recognized by Norman Tindale as an independent tribal grouping.

== Name ==
The Braiakaulung are also known as the Brayakaboong, meaning "men of the west".

== Country ==
The Braiakaulung's lands extended over 6,700 square kilometres (2,600 sq mi), taking in Providence Ponds, the Avon and Latrobe rivers. They extended west of Lake Wellington as far as Mount Baw Baw and Mount Howitt.

== Alternative names ==
- Braiakolung
- Brayakaboong
- Brayakau
- Brayakaulung
- Breagalong
- Nulit (name applied to language spoken by several associated tribes)

== Sources ==
- Attwood, Bain (1987). "Tarra Bobby, a Brataualung man" (PDF). Aboriginal History. 11: 41–57.
- Fison, Lorimer; Howitt, Alfred William (1880). Kamilaroi and Kurnai (PDF). Melbourne: G Robinson.
- Tindale, Norman Barnett (1974). Aboriginal Tribes of Australia: Their Terrain, Environmental Controls, Distribution, Limits, and Proper Names. Australian National University Press. ISBN 978-0-708-10741-6.
