= Lorimer Fison =

Anthropologist

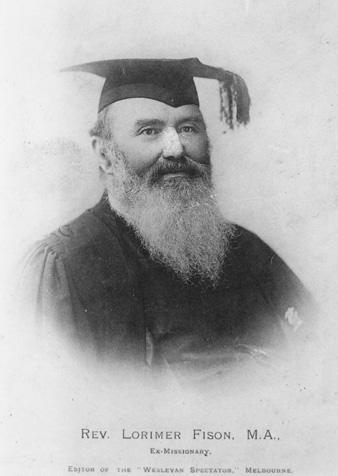
- Born: 9 November 1832; Barningham, Suffolk, England
- Died: 29 December 1907 (aged 75); Essendon, Melbourne, Australia
- Occupation: Methodist minister

Academic background
- Education: Caius College; University of Melbourne

Academic work
- Discipline: anthropology
- Main interests: customs of Fijians and Indigenous Australians

Lorimer Fison (9 November 1832 – 29 December 1907) was an Australian anthropologist, Methodist minister and journalist.

== Early life ==
Fison was born at Barningham, Suffolk, England, the son of Thomas Fison, a prosperous landowner, and his wife Charlotte, a daughter of the Rev. John Reynolds, who was a translator of seventeenth-century religious writers. Fison was educated at a school at Sheffield, then at the University of Cambridge where he studied with a tutor before becoming a student of Caius College in June 1855. After a "boyish escapade" at college he left for Australia. His sister was Anna Fison, translator and educator.

== Late life ==
Fison died on 29 December 1907 at Essendon, Melbourne.
