= Woodside railway station, Victoria =

Former railway station in Victoria, Australia

Woodside

General information
- Coordinates: 38°31′11″S 146°52′42″E
- Line: Woodside

Other information
- Status: Closed

History
- Opened: 22 June 1923
- Closed: 25 May 1953

Services
Preceding station	VicRail	Following station
Napier towards Spencer Street	South Gippsland line	Terminus
Location

Woodside was the original terminus station on the Woodside railway line, and opened in June 1923. It closed in May 1953, along with the other stations on the line, apart from Yarram.
