= Port Albert =

- Town
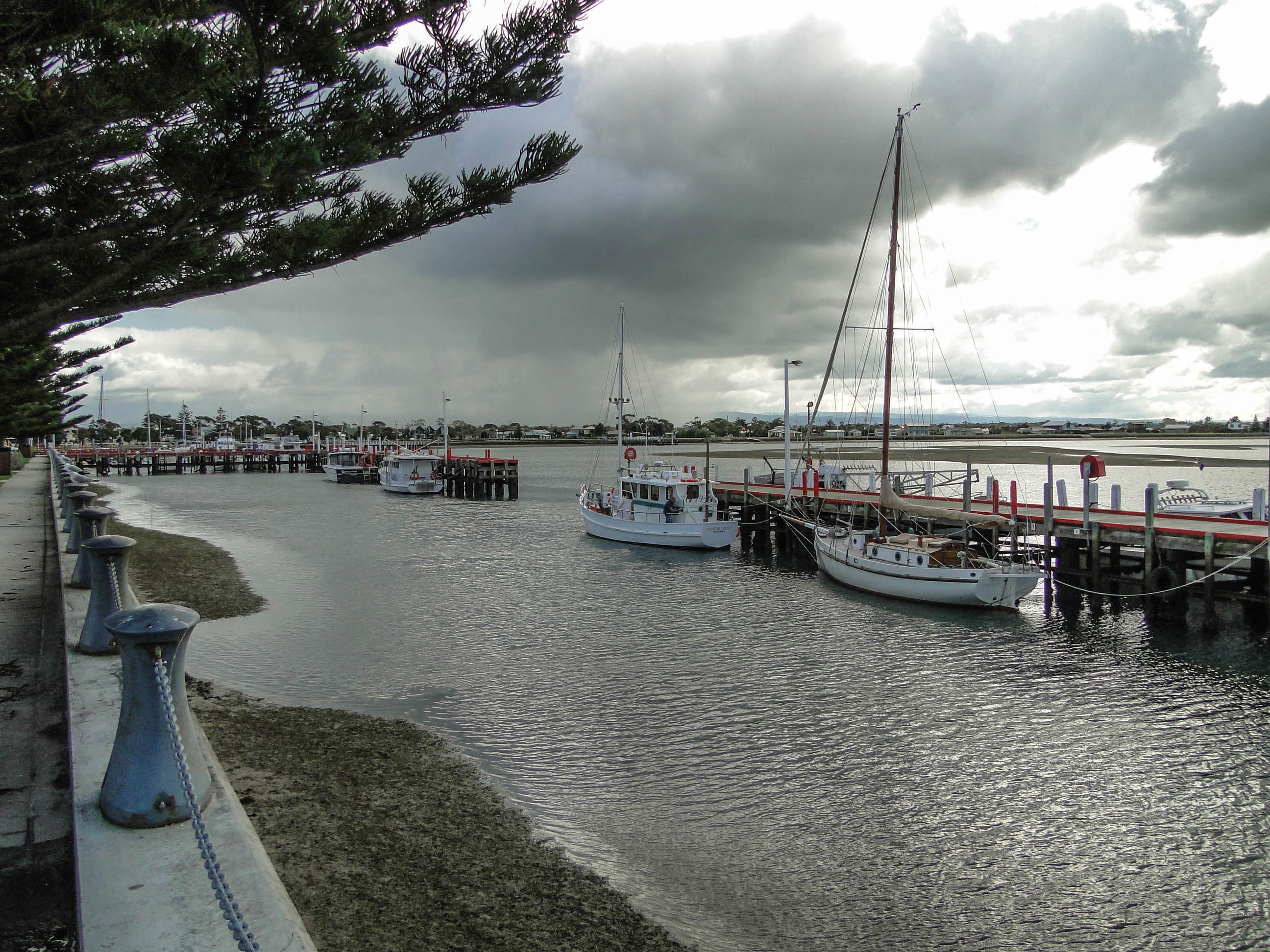
- The wharf at Port Albert.

- Coordinates: 38°39′55″S 146°41′18″E
- Country: Australia
- State: Victoria
- LGA: Shire of Wellington
- Location: 236 km (147 mi) SE of Melbourne; 82 km (51 mi) S of Morwell; 13 km (8.1 mi) S of Yarram

Government
  - State electorate: Gippsland South
  - Federal division: Gippsland

Population
  - Total: 403 (2016 census)
- Postcode: 3971

Port Albert is a town in Victoria, Australia, on the coast of Corner Inlet on the Yarram - Port Albert Road, 82 kilometres (51 mi) south-east of Morwell, 236 kilometres (147 mi) south-east of Melbourne, in the Shire of Wellington. At the 2016 census, Port Albert had a population of 403.

== Location and features ==
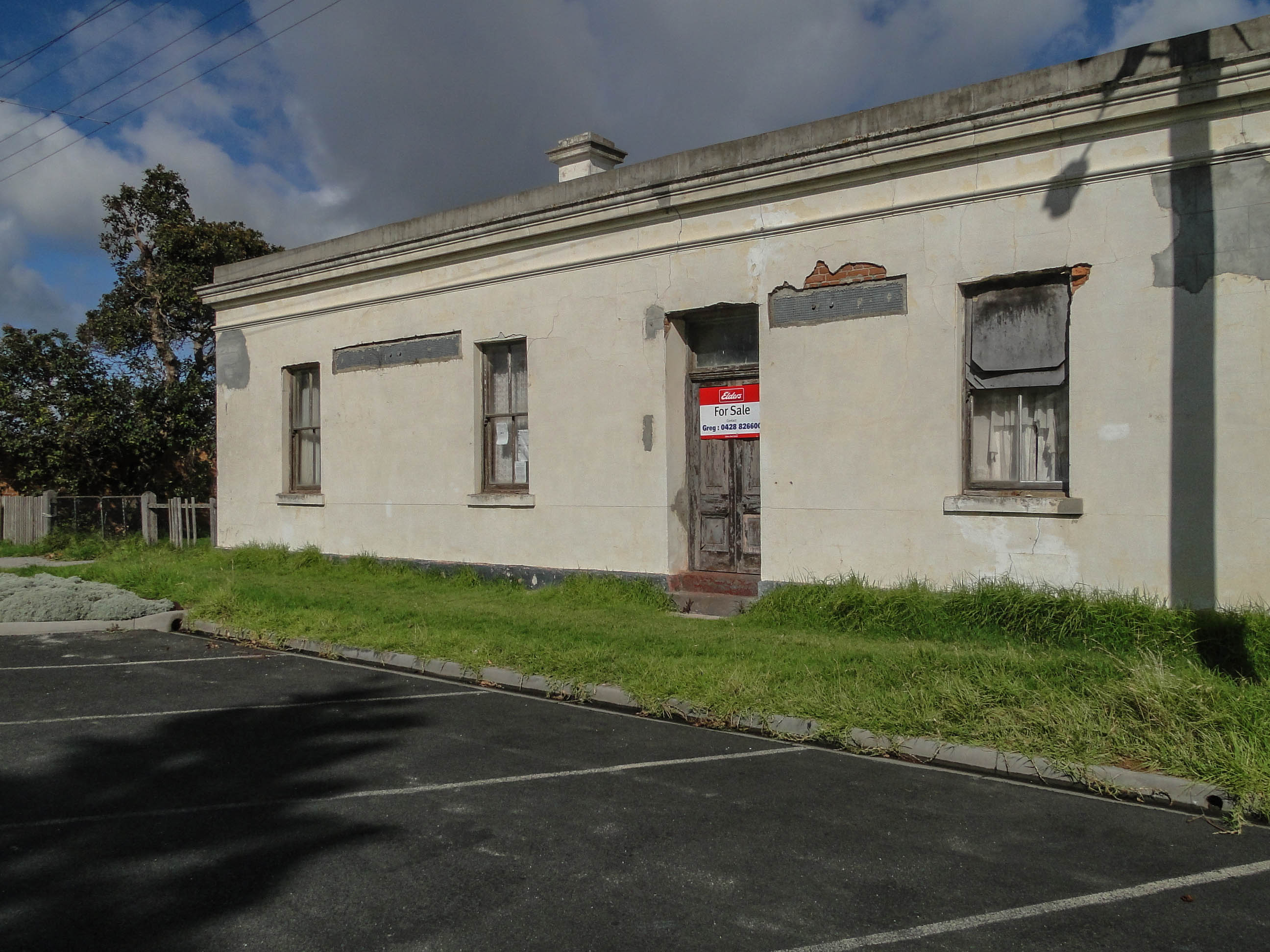
The office of Turnbull, Orr and Co., built in 1844

Port Albert was one of the earliest ports established in Victoria. In 1841 the Gippsland Company investigated the area following favourable reports from explorer Angus McMillan. In May of that year the first settlers arrived.

Initially the area was known as Seabank or Old Port, but was changed to New Leith when the town started developing, and later changed to Alberton and Port Albert in honour of Prince Albert of Saxe-Coburg and Gotha, the husband of Queen Victoria.

The Post Office opened on 1 November 1842 as Alberton (it was renamed Port Albert in 1856) and was the fourth to open in the Port Phillip District. It became the administrative centre of Gippsland and a transport hub for cargo between Melbourne and Van Diemen's Land (now Tasmania), thanks to its 250-metre timber jetty. As the Victorian Gold Rush began in the 1850s, traffic through Port Albert increased, bringing prospectors from Europe and China, many of whom were headed for the Dargo goldfields. This further added to Port Albert's prosperity.

During the 1870s and 1880s, Gippsland was gradually settled, and connected to the railway network. This reduced Port Albert's role as an important transport hub, and the population subsequently decreased.

Today the town acts as a commercial fishing port, and is popular with fishers and surfers. The town hosts a fishing competition each March.

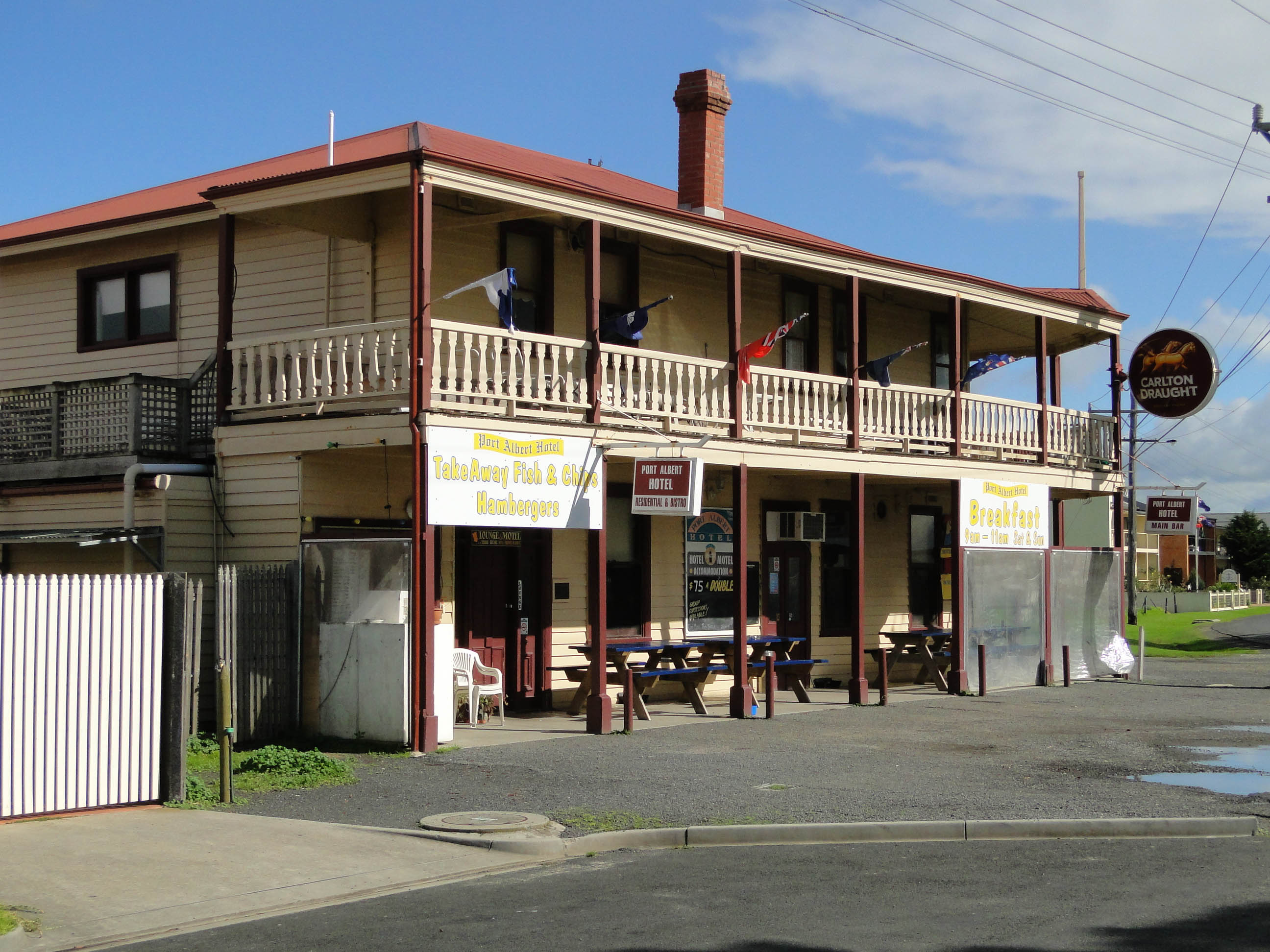
Two-storey wooden hotel at Port Albert, Victoria, Australia

The town's historic two-storey wooden hotel, established in 1841 and the oldest continuously licensed hotel in Victoria, was burned down in February 2014. The fire was believed to have been deliberately lit. In July 2019 plans were announced to build a $5,000,000 hotel and accommodation complex on the site.

Drum Island, around 110 hectares in size, lies off the coast.

== People ==
Irene Bolger the leading trade unionist was raised here.

== See also ==
- Port Albert railway station
- Port Albert railway line
