= Yarram railway station =

Former railway station in Victoria, Australia

Coordinates: 38°33′47″S 146°40′23″E

Yarram
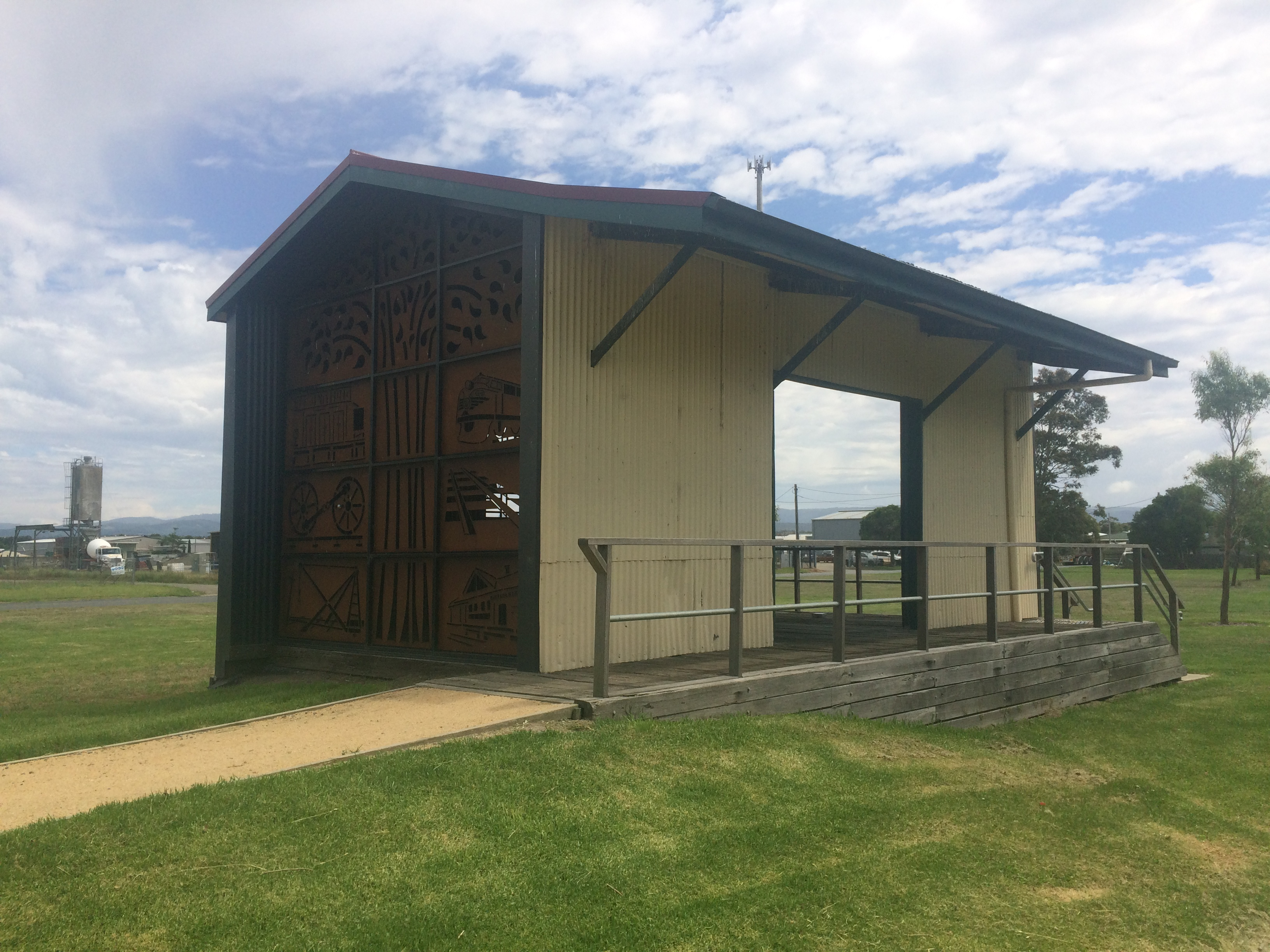
- Yarram railway station goods shed, 2022

General information
- Line: Woodside
- Platforms: 1
- Tracks: 4

Other information
- Status: Closed

History
- Opened: 8 February 1921
- Closed: 6 June 1981: station 26 October 1987: line

Services
Preceding station	VicRail	Following station
Alberton towards Spencer Street	South Gippsland line 1921-1953	Devon towards Woodside
Alberton towards Spencer Street	South Gippsland line 1953-1981	Terminus
Location

Yarram was a railway station on the Woodside railway line in the Australian state of Victoria. The railway opened to the town of Yarram on 8 February 1921. In the mid-1950s, it was the only station on the Woodside line to remain open, effectively making it the terminus of the South Gippsland line or Great Southern Railway. The station was closed in October 1987, along with Alberton and Welshpool stations.

Passenger services to the station ceased when the New Deal for Country Passengers was inaugurated in 1981. Steamrail Victoria ran the last rail enthusiast train trip to Yarram on Saturday, 24 October 1987, with seven wooden carriages hauled by a Victorian Railways K Class locomotive (K153). The line was closed on Monday, 26 October, which ended rail freight services between Welshpool and Yarram, and the line terminated at Welshpool after that. The track from Barry Beach Junction to Yarram was removed a few years before the track was removed from Leongatha to Welshpool, and Agnes (Barry Beach Junction) to Barry Beach in 1994.

After several years of disuse, the Yarram station goods shed was converted into a youth centre to re-engage young people with education and the community. The youth centre ceased operation after a number of successful years of catering to the needs of the youth of the district.

Only a small section of the goods shed now remains, which comprises a covered area with tables for picnickers. It is the only remaining part of the once-thriving Yarram Station. The rail reserve between the site of Yarram Railway Station and the neighbouring township of Alberton is now the Tarra Rail Trail, which includes approximately seven kilometres of walking and cycling track, man-made wetlands, outdoor exercise equipment and a skatepark.
