= Athlone, Victoria =

Athlone
- Town

- Coordinates: 38°14′37″S 145°46′35″E
- Country: Australia
- State: Victoria
- LGA: Shire of Baw Baw
- Location: 113 km (70 mi) SE of Melbourne; 56 km (35 mi) SW of Moe; 17 km (11 mi) S of Drouin

Government
  - State electorate: Narracan
  - Federal division: Monash

Population
  - Total: 147 (2021 census)
- Postcode: 3818

Athlone is a locality in Victoria, Australia. It is located on Drouin - Korumburra Road, in the Shire of Baw Baw.

A railway station was located in Athlone, part of the Strzelecki railway line. The station was opened on 29 June 1922 and was closed on 7 August 1941 following flooding of the Lang Lang River, after which the line was closed back to Yannathan station.

A primary school opened in 9 August 1909 and operated until 31 December 2013.

Athlone has a public hall located at 895 Drouin-Korumburra Road, Athlone and reserve.
