= Bayles railway station =

Former railway station in Victoria, Australia

Coordinates: 38°10′41″S 145°34′15″E

Bayles

General information
- Line: Strzelecki
- Platforms: 2 (1 passenger, 1 goods)
- Tracks: 2

Other information
- Status: Closed

History
- Opened: 29 June 1922; 104 years ago
- Closed: 4 February 1959; 67 years ago

Services
Preceding station	VicRail	Following station
Koo Wee Rup towards Spencer Street	Strzelecki line	Catani towards Strzelecki
Location

Bayles was a railway station on the Strzelecki line in South Gippsland, Victoria, Australia. The station was opened on 29 June 1922. Bayles was the final station to remain open the entire life of the Strzelecki line; it was the terminus of the line from 15 April 1950 when the line was truncated from Yannathan. The short section of track was kept open mostly to serve the local butter factory. In 1972, the Bayles Fauna Park was opened on the former site of the station and goods yard.
