= Topiram railway station =

Former railway station in Victoria, Australia

Coordinates: 38°16′37″S 145°48′44″E

Topiram

General information
- Line: Strzelecki
- Platforms: 2 (1 passenger, 1 goods)
- Tracks: 2

Other information
- Status: Closed

History
- Opened: 29 June 1922; 104 years ago
- Closed: 7 August 1941; 85 years ago

Services
Preceding station	Disused railways	Following station
Athlone	Strzelecki line	Triholm
	List of closed railway stations in Victoria	
Location

Topiram was a railway station on the Strzelecki railway line in South Gippsland, Victoria, Australia. The station was opened on 29 June 1922, and was closed on 7 August 1941 following flooding of the Lang Lang River, which resulted in damage to one of the four trestle bridges over the river, after which the line was closed back to Yannathan station.

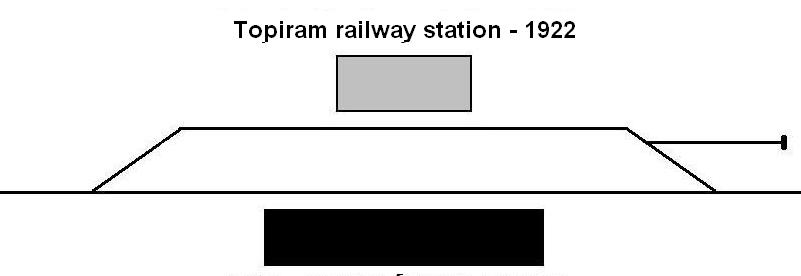

== Station facilities ==
Upon opening of the line in 1922 Topiram station was supplied with cattle and sheep yards, goods loading and storage facilities, and passenger facilities.
