= Triholm railway station =

Former railway station in Victoria, Australia

Triholm

General information
- Line: Strzelecki
- Platforms: 2 (1 passenger, 1 goods)
- Tracks: 2

Other information
- Status: Closed

History
- Opened: 29 June 1922; 104 years ago
- Closed: 7 August 1941; 85 years ago

Services
| Preceding station | Disused railways | Following station |
|---|---|---|
| Topiram | Strzelecki line | Strzelecki |
| | List of closed railway stations in Victoria | |

Triholm was a railway station on the Strzelecki railway line in South Gippsland, Victoria, Australia. The station was opened on 29 June 1922. Triholm became the line terminus station from 22 November 1930 when Strzelecki station was closed due to a timber trestle bridge developing a large sway every time a train passed over it. It was deemed uneconomical to rebuild it and the section was closed after being in operation for only eight years. Triholm was then the terminus station until it was closed on 7 August 1941 following flooding of the Lang Lang River, which resulted in damage to one of the four trestle bridges over that river, after which the line was closed back to Yannathan station.

== Station facilities ==
Upon opening of the line in 1922 Triholm station was supplied with cattle and sheep yards, goods loading and storage facilities, and passenger facilities, even though Triholm was the terminus station for 11 years it was never fitted with a turntable, which required trains to run tender first on down runs.

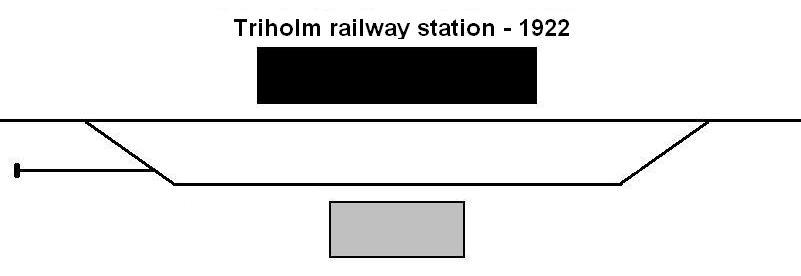
