= Caldermeade railway station =

Former railway station in Victoria, Australia

Coordinates: 38°14′40″S 145°32′33″E

Caldermeade

General information
- Line: South Gippsland
- Platforms: 1
- Tracks: 1 (2 until 1960s)

Other information
- Status: Closed

History
- Opened: 11 November 1890; 135 years ago
- Closed: 6 October 1958; 67 years ago

Services
Preceding station	VicRail	Following station
Monomeith towards Spencer Street	South Gippsland line	Lang Lang towards Yarram
Location

Caldermeade railway station was located on the South Gippsland line in Caldermeade, South Gippsland, Victoria. The station opened on 11 November 1890, when the line from Tooradin was extended to Loch, and was closed to all traffic on 6 October 1958. The station has since been demolished, with no remains intact. However, the track still remains in a reasonable condition.
