= Koo Wee Rup railway station =

Former railway station in Victoria, Australia

Coordinates: 38°12′05″S 145°29′19″E

Koo Wee Rup

General information
- Line: South Gippsland
- Platforms: 1
- Tracks: 1 (3 till 1994)

Other information
- Status: Closed

History
- Opened: 11 November 1890; 135 years ago
- Closed: 24 July 1993; 33 years ago (Passenger)

Services
Preceding station	VicRail	Following station
Dalmore towards Spencer Street	South Gippsland line	Monomeith towards Yarram
Dalmore towards Spencer Street	Strzelecki line	Bayles towards Strzelecki
Preceding station	V/Line	Following station
Cranbourne towards Spencer Street	South Gippsland line	Lang Lang towards Leongatha
Location

Koo Wee Rup was a railway station on the South Gippsland line in South Gippsland, Victoria, Australia. The station operated until the closure of the line between Cranbourne Station and Leongatha Station in July 1993. The station remains partly intact with the platform and goods shed (now privately owned) intact, however the track one kilometre on each side of the station platform has been dismantled, and replaced by a concrete pathway for bicycles and recreational use. Koo Wee Rup was also the junction of the branch line to Strzelecki. The establishment of the pathway has effectively removed any likelihood that the railway will be rehabilitated. It can also be seen as being the start of a rail trail on the railway reserve, stretching back to Cranbourne, which will block future rail transport options for people in Cranbourne East, Clyde, and surrounding areas.

== Current status ==
Between 1999 and 2008 there was constant speculation that the railway line from Cranbourne to Leongatha would re-open, as promised by the then Victorian State Government, under a project named 'Bringing Trains Back to Victorians'. Electrification of the railway beyond Cranbourne to Cranbourne East, Clyde and even as far as Koo Wee Rup had been advocated to serve the rapidly growing suburban fringe of south-east Melbourne.

However, in May 2008, a scoping study carried out on behalf of the government found the costs of returning services high, at $72 million. Therefore, plans to reopen the line were halted, and the government pledged to spend $14.2 million on improved V/Line coach services in the South Gippsland region instead. As well, it was later announced that the railway reservation would be used for a rail trail between Cranbourne East and Nyora.

Reopening the South Gippsland railway line as far as Leongatha continues to be a prominent issue for the region. South Gippsland Shire Council Priority Projects documents released in June 2013 stated that the return of rail was a major community priority, with funding and support being sought from all levels of government.

In early 2014, a report into possible extensions of the Melbourne metropolitan rail system identified the population growth corridor from Cranbourne to Koo-Wee-Rup, along the disused Leongatha line, as a key planning priority. Established in April 2011, the South and West Gippsland Transport Group has continued to campaign for an integrated transport plan in the region. Rail services has been included at the forefront of the proposal in close association with the South Gippsland Shire Council and other local governments. One notable achievement of the group in the past was running the successful campaign that saw passenger rail services reinstated to Leongatha on 9 December 1984. After the abandonment in 2008 by then premier John Brumby of the promise to revive the railway line for freight and passenger services made by the government of his predecessor Steve Bracks, a community campaign involving the South and West Gippsland Transport Group continues to lobby key stakeholders and governments to reinstate rail services, to improve transport accessibility in the region.

== Rail trail ==
Starting in early March 2012, the railway track has been gradually removed from the Koo Wee Rup area as a first step toward the creation of a rail trail on the railway alignment. The first section has been constructed - formed as a concrete pathway running one kilometre each side of the former Koo Wee Rup railway station platform.

== Images of the railway at Koo Wee Rup ==
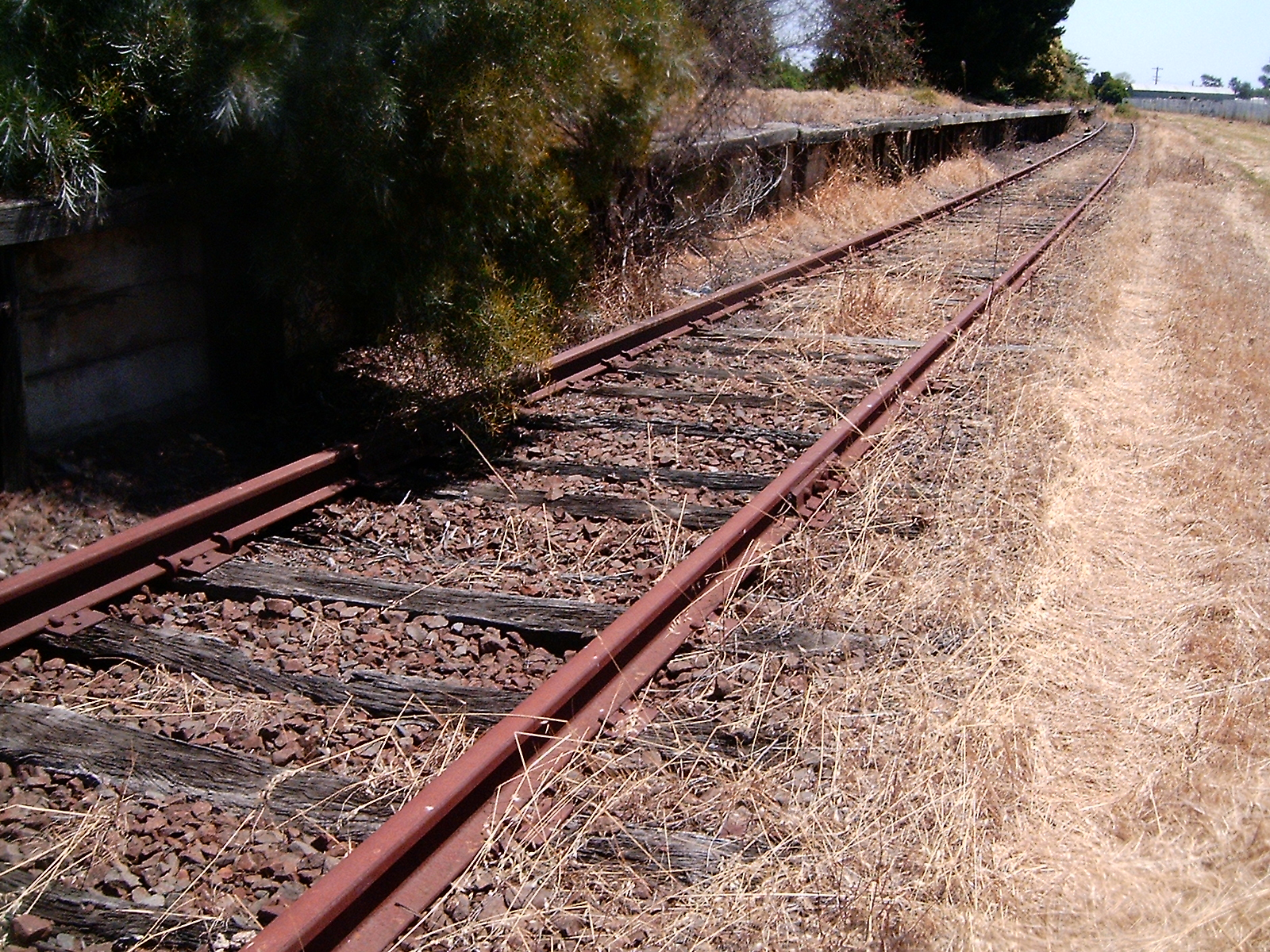
Close up view of the platform (Nov. 2009). By 2012 this track had been dismantled and replaced by a concrete footpath. (May 2012)

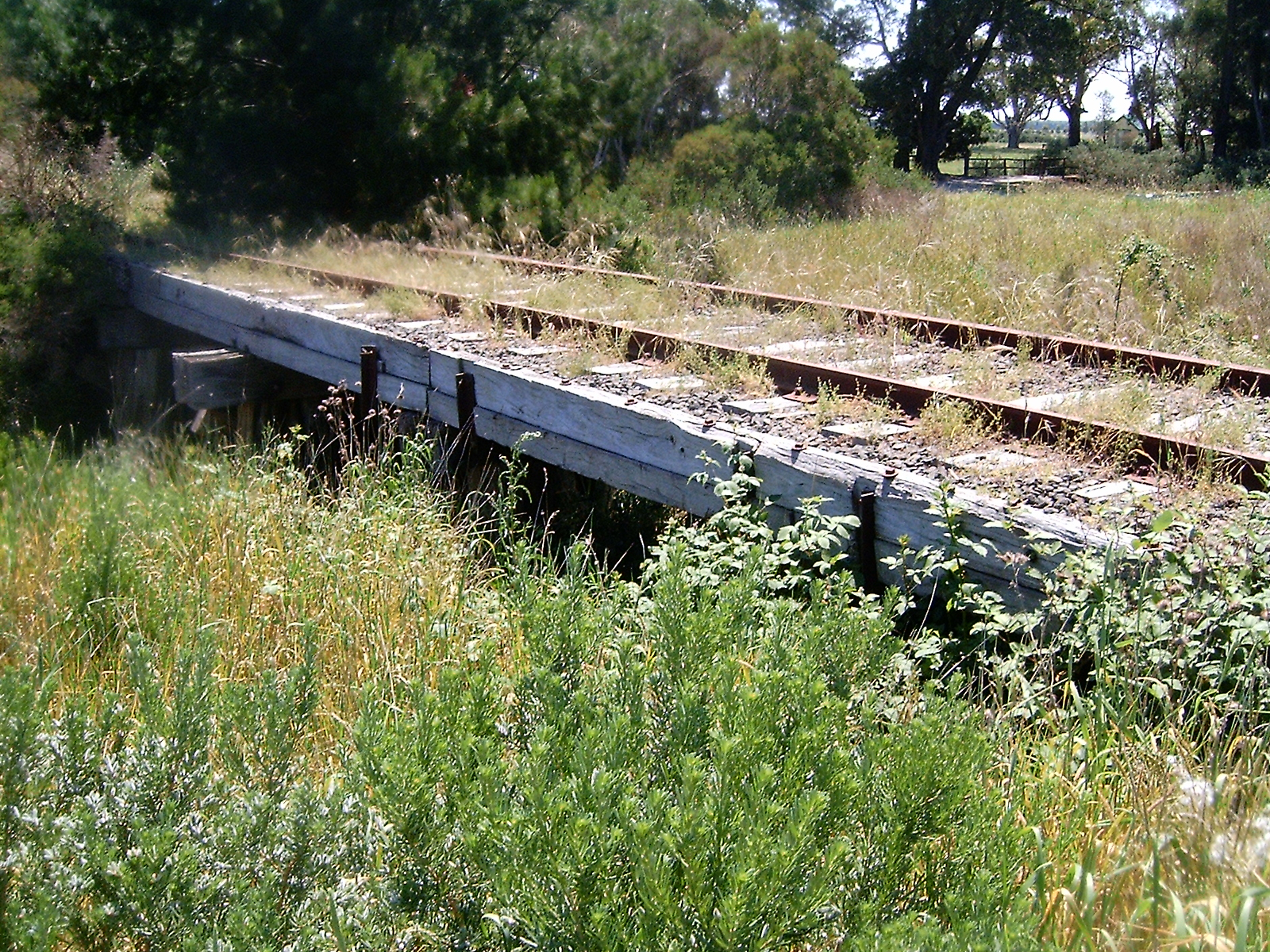
Rail bridge over Bunyip River off Railway Road

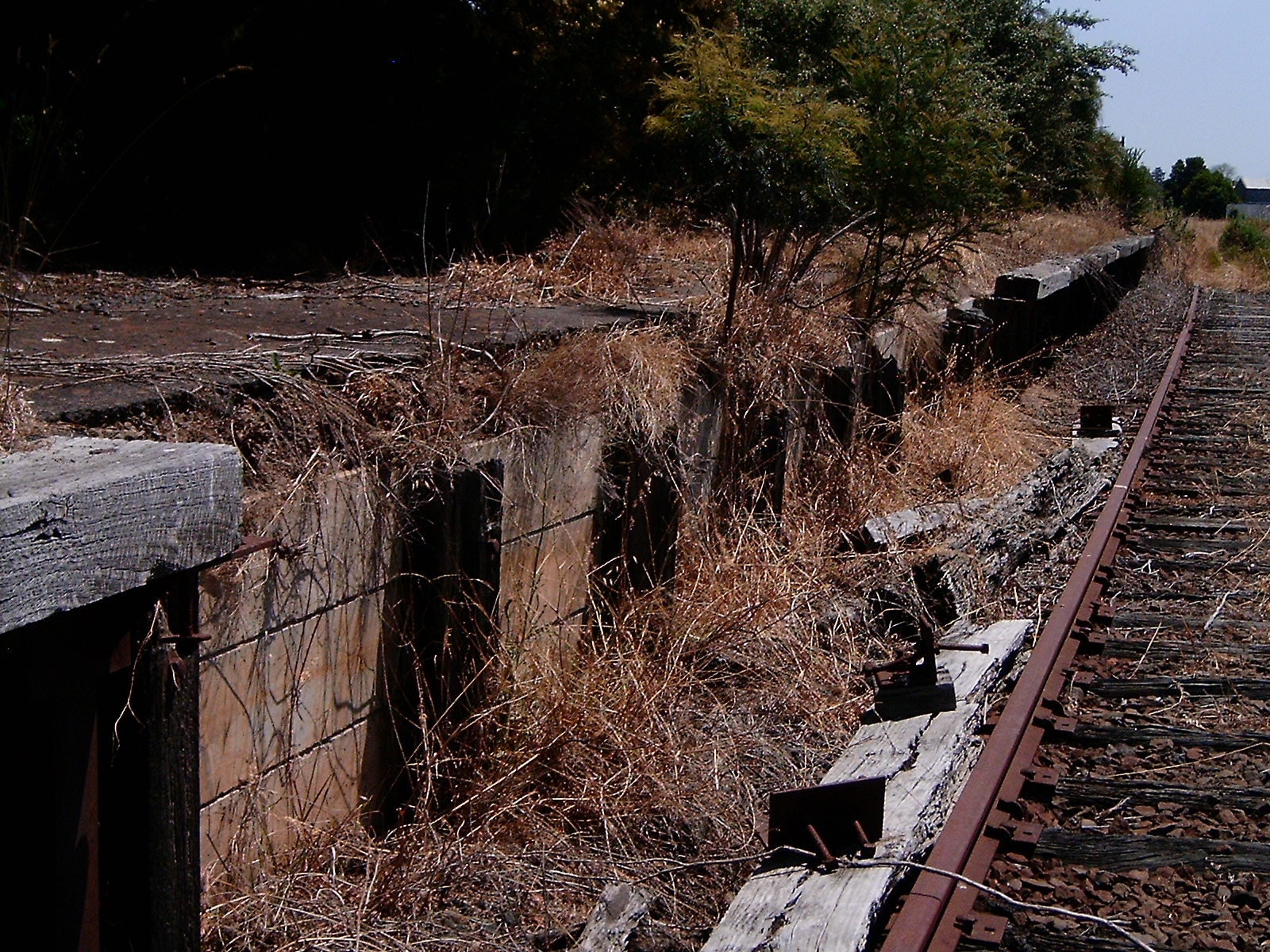
Collapsed platform face

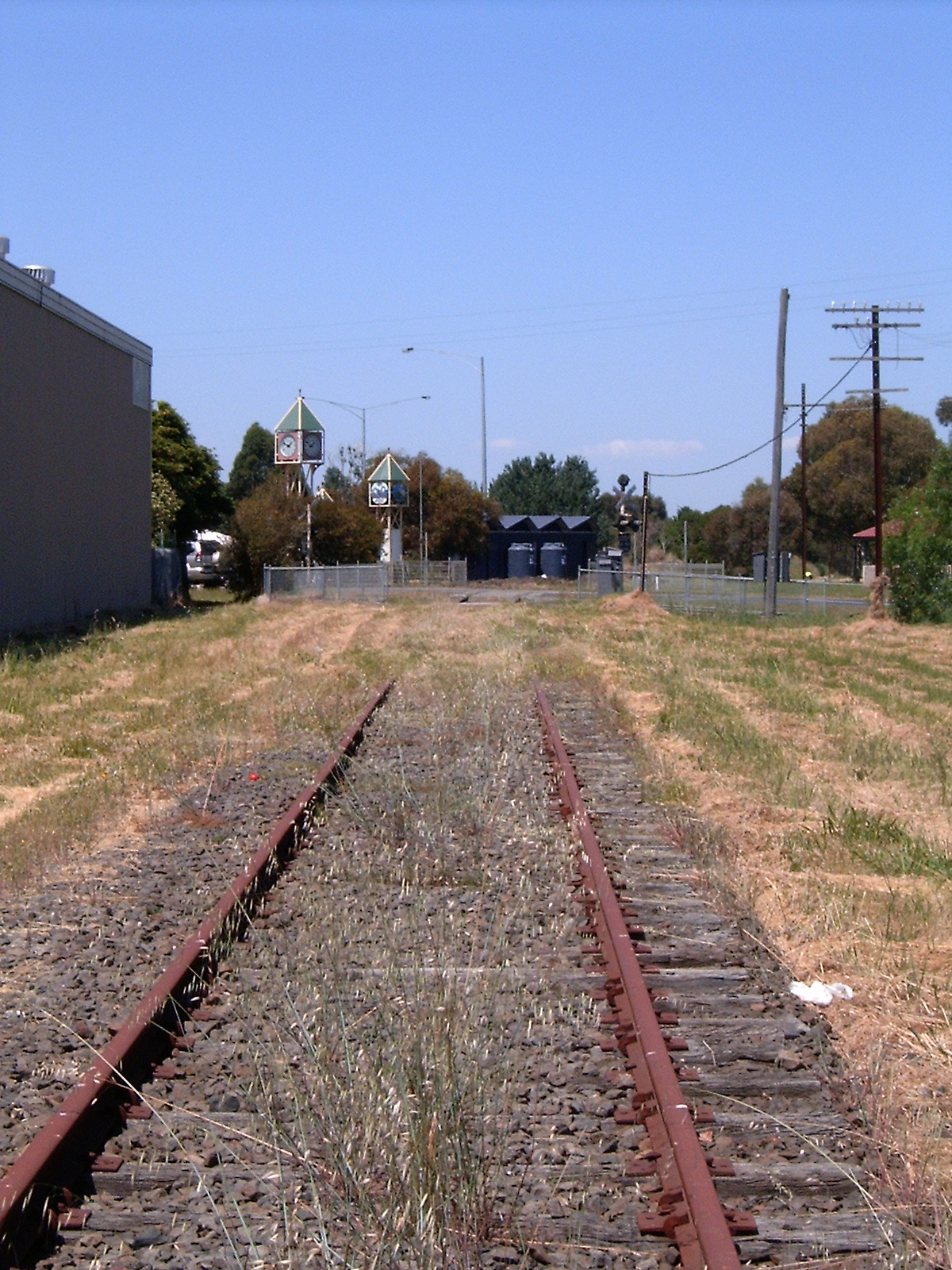
A new toilet block physically cuts the line near the former station
