= Catani railway station =

Former railway station in Victoria, Australia

Coordinates: 38°11′37″S 145°38′28″E

Catani

General information
- Line: Strzelecki
- Platforms: 2 (1 passenger, 1 goods)
- Tracks: 2

Other information
- Status: Closed

History
- Opened: 29 June 1922; 104 years ago
- Closed: 15 April 1950; 76 years ago

Services
Preceding station	Disused railways	Following station
Bayles	Strzelecki line	Yannathan
	List of closed railway stations in Victoria	
Location

Catani was a railway station on the Strzelecki railway line in South Gippsland, Victoria, Australia. The station was opened on 29 June 1922, and closed on 15 April 1950 along with Yannathan station, when the line was truncated to Bayles station leaving it the only remaining station on the Strzelecki line until it too was closed on 4 February 1959.

== Station facilities ==
Upon opening of the line in 1922 Catani station was supplied with goods loading and storage facilities, sheep hurdles, departmental residence and passenger facilities.

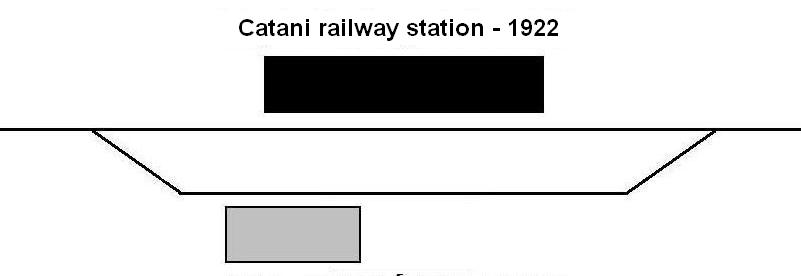
