= Heath Hill railway station =

Former railway station in Victoria, Australia

Coordinates: 38.239722°S 145.779444°E

Heath Hill

General information
- Line: Strzelecki
- Platforms: 2 (1 passenger, 1 goods)
- Tracks: 2

Other information
- Status: Closed

History
- Opened: 1922; 104 years ago
- Closed: 1941; 85 years ago

Services
Preceding station	Disused railways	Following station
Yannathan	Strzelecki line	Athlone
	List of closed railway stations in Victoria	
Location

Heath Hill was a railway station on the Strzelecki railway line in South Gippsland, Victoria, Australia. The station was opened on 29 June 1922, and closed on 7 August 1941 following flooding of the Lang Lang River, which resulted in damages to one of the four trestle bridges over the river, after which the line was closed back to Yannathan station.

== Station facilities ==
Upon opening of the line in 1922 Heath Hill station was supplied with goods loading and storage facilities, passenger facilities and departmental residence.

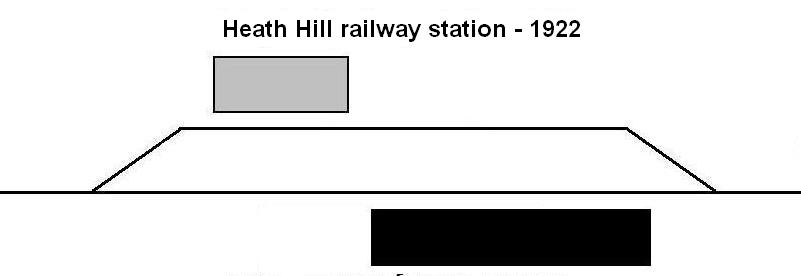
