= Lang Lang (disambiguation) =

Lang Lang (born 1982) is a Chinese pianist.

Lang Lang may also refer to:

- Lang Lang, Victoria, a town in Australia
- Lang Lang River, a river in Gippsland, Victoria, Australia
- A character from the Japanese manga Steam Detectives

== See also ==
- Cananga odorata, a tree valued for its perfume whose common names include Ylang-ylang and ilang-ilang
