= Dalmore =

Dalmore may refer to the following places:

== Scotland ==
- Dail Mòr, Isle of Lewis
- Dalmore, Auchendinny, Midlothian
- Dalmore distillery, Alness, producing The Dalmore single malt whisky
- Dalmore House and Estate, East Ayrshire

== Australia and New Zealand ==
- Dalmore, Victoria, Australia
  - Dalmore railway station, now closed
- Dalmore, New Zealand, a suburb of Dunedin
