= Athlone (disambiguation) =

Athlone is a major town and River Shannon crossing in County Westmeath in Ireland.

Athlone may also refer to:

== Geography (by country) ==
- Athlone, Victoria, Australia
- Athlone, Edmonton, a neighbourhood in Edmonton, Canada
- Athlone, Newfoundland and Labrador, Canada
- Athlone, Cape Town, South Africa
- Athlone, Durban, South Africa
- Athlone Park, a coastal suburb south of Durban, South Africa
- Athlone, California, United States
- Athlone, Michigan, United States
- Athlone, Harare, Zimbabwe, a suburb of Harare

== Politics ==
- Athlone (Parliament of Ireland constituency), a constituency represented in the Irish House of Commons until 1800
- Athlone (UK Parliament constituency), a former United Kingdom Parliament constituency

== Others ==
- the Earl of Athlone, a title in the Peerage of Ireland (and later in the Peerage of the United Kingdom)
- Athlone Radio Station, the first high-power broadcasting station of Ireland situated at Athlone
- Athlone Castle
- The Athlone Press, an academic publishing company with offices in London and New York
- Athlone Pursuivant a heraldic officer

== See also ==
- Athlon, microprocessor produced by AMD
