= Clyde railway station, Victoria =

Former railway station in Victoria, Australia

Coordinates: 38.1353°S 145.3366°E

Clyde

General information
- Lines: Leongatha(closed); Cranbourne (proposed)
- Platforms: 1
- Tracks: 1

Other information
- Status: Closed

History
- Opened: 1 October 1888; 138 years ago
- Closed: 6 June 1981; 45 years ago (Passenger)

Services
Preceding station	VicRail	Following station
Cranbourne towards Spencer Street	South Gippsland line	Tooradin towards Yarram
Proposed services
Preceding station	Metro Trains	Following station
East Cranbourne towards Watergardens or Sunbury via Metro Tunnel	Cranbourne line	Terminus
Location

Clyde was a railway station on the South Gippsland railway line in South Gippsland, Victoria, Australia, the station operated until the closure of the line between Cranbourne Station and Leongatha Station in 1993. All that remains of this station now is the platform mound, however the track is still in reasonable condition.

== History ==
Between 1999 and 2008, there was constant speculation that the railway line beyond Cranbourne to Leongatha could re-open as promised by the Victorian State Government, under a project named 'Bringing Trains Back to Victorians'. However, in May 2008, a scoping study carried out on behalf of the Victorian government found the costs of returning services were high, at $72 million.

Therefore, plans to reopen the line were halted, and the Government will spend $14.2 million on improved V/Line coach services instead. Further, there are plans in motion to turn the railway reservation into a Rail Trail between Cranbourne East and Nyora.

In 2013, as part of Public Transport Victoria's Network Development Plan for Metropolitan Rail, an extension of the Cranbourne line to Clyde was earmarked to begin in the "long-term", which would equate to at least over 20 years into the future. PTV claimed that a Clyde extension could also allow for a future extension to Tooradin, Victoria, where there are proposals for a new airport.

Reopening the South Gippsland railway line as far as Leongatha is continuing to feature as a prominent issue for the region. A South Gippsland Shire Council Priority Projects documents released in June 2013 acknowledged that the return of rail as a major community priority where funding and support are sought from all forms of level government. In early 2014, a report into the extensions of the Melbourne metropolitan rail system identified the population growth corridor from Cranbourne to Koo-Wee-Rup along the disused Leongatha line as a key planning priority.

The South and West Gippsland Transport Group, a public transportation and rail lobby group established in April 2011 that is closely associated with the South Gippsland Shire Council and local forms of government has continued to campaign for an integrated transport plan in the region, which includes rail at the forefront of the proposal. Previously, the group was classified as the South Gippsland Transport Users Group and had amalgamated with numerous rail lobby groups in 1994 shortly after the rail passenger service to Leongatha was withdrawn in July 1993 and the line to Barry Beach and Yarram was formally closed in June 1992 and dismantled by December 1994. One notable milestone that this group achieved in the past was running a successful campaign that saw passenger rail services reinstated to Leongatha on 9 December 1984.

Despite the political promise to revive the railway line for freight and passenger services by the Steve Bracks-led Labor government in 1999 being abandoned in 2008 by his successor John Brumby, a public community campaign involving the South and West Gippsland Transport Group is continuing to lobby and work collaboratively with key stakeholders and governments to reinstate rail services that focuses on improving transport accessibility in the region.

In January 2018, City of Casey advised that it would need almost $3 billion worth of rail and road infrastructure to bring its transport services by extending the metropolitan train between Cranbourne Station and Clyde Station with duplicated railway tracks between Dandenong and Cranbourne Station.
