= Yannathan railway station =

Former railway station in Victoria, Australia

Coordinates: 38°13′41″S 145°38′23″E

Yannathan

General information
- Line: Strzelecki
- Platforms: 2 (1 passenger, 1 goods)
- Tracks: 3

Other information
- Status: Closed

History
- Opened: 29 June 1922; 104 years ago
- Closed: 15 April 1950; 76 years ago

Services
Preceding station	Disused railways	Following station
Catani	Strzelecki line	Heath Hill
	List of closed railway stations in Victoria	
Location

Yannathan was a railway station on the Strzelecki railway line in South Gippsland, Victoria, Australia. The station was opened on 29 June 1922. Yannthan was the terminus station on the Strezlecki line from 7 August 1941 following flooding of the Lang Lang River, resulting in damages to one of the four trestle bridges over the river. Yannathan was closed on 15 April 1950 when the line was truncated up to Bayles Station.

== Station facilities ==
Upon opening of the line in 1922 Yannathan station was supplied with cattle and sheep yards, goods loading and storage facilities, gangers departmental residence, gangers tool shed, gangers headquarters and passenger facilities. even though Yannathan was the terminus station for 9 years it was never fitted with a turntable, which required trains to run tender first on down runs.
