= Athlone railway station, Victoria =

Former railway station in Victoria, Australia

Coordinates: 38°14′23″S 145°46′46″E

Athlone

General information
- Line: Strzelecki
- Platforms: 1 (1 passenger)
- Tracks: 2

Other information
- Status: Closed

History
- Opened: 29 June 1922; 104 years ago
- Closed: 7 August 1941; 85 years ago

Services
Preceding station	Disused railways	Following station
Heath Hill	Strzelecki line	Topiram
	List of closed railway stations in Victoria	
Location

Athlone was a railway station on the Strzelecki railway line in South Gippsland, Victoria, Australia. The station was opened in 1922, and was closed on 7 August 1941 following flooding of the Lang Lang River, which resulted in damage to one of the four trestle bridges over the river, after which the line was closed back to Yannathan station.

== Station facilities ==
Upon opening of the line in 1922, Athlone station was supplied with sheep yards, passenger facilities, an oil driven water pumping plant and water tower as well as departmental residence.
