= List of acts of the Parliament of Victoria from 1937 =

This is a list of acts of the Parliament of Victoria, Australia for the year 1937.

== 1937 ==
Short title, or popular name	Citation	Royal assent
Long title
	No. 4466	7 July 1937
An Act to apply out of the Consolidated Revenue the sum of Two million five hundred and thirteen thousand four hundred and seventeen pounds to the service of the year One thousand nine hundred and thirty-seven and One thousand nine hundred and thirty-eight.
Parliamentary Debates Publication Act 1937	No. 4468	10 August 1937
An Act relating to the Publication of the Reports of Parliamentary Debates.
	No. 4469	23 August 1937
An Act to apply out of the Consolidated Revenue the sum of Five hundred and ninety-two thousand one hundred and sixty-one pounds to the service of the year One thousand nine hundred and thirty-six and One thousand nine hundred and thirty-seven.
Melbourne (Bowen-street) Land Act 1937	No. 4470	1 September 1937
An Act to provide for the Closing of Portion of a certain Street in the City of Melbourne, and to declare the Land upon which the said Portion of the said Street is set out to be unalienated Land of the Crown, and for other purposes.
	No. 4471	1 September 1937
An Act to apply out of the Consolidated Revenue the sum of Two million five hundred and eighty thousand nine hundred and six pounds to the service of the year One thousand nine hundred and thirty-seven and One thousand nine hundred and thirty-eight.
	No. 4473	25 October 1937
An Act to apply out of the Consolidated Revenue the sum of Two million five hundred and fifty-four thousand three hundred and thirty-two pounds to the service of the year One thousand nine hundred and thirty-seven and One thousand nine hundred and thirty-eight.
Local Government (Temporary Reduction of Interest) Act 1937	No. 4476	15 November 1937
An Act to amend the Local Government (Temporary Reduction of Interest) Act 1931. (Note: Local Government (Temporary Reduction of Interest) Act 1931 (No. 3985))
Local Government (Celebrations) Act 1937 (Note: The 'celebrations' were for the Coronation of King George VI.)	No. 4481	15 November 1937
An Act to authorize and validate certain Expenditure by Councils of Municipalities.
Federal Aid Roads and Works Act 1937	No. 4482	15 November 1937
An Act to approve an Agreement between the Commonwealth of Australia and the State of Victoria relating to the making available by the Commonwealth of Moneys for the purpose of Construction Re-construction Maintenance or Repair of Roads or other Works connected with Transport.
Administration and Probate (Testator's Family Maintenance) Act 1937	No. 4483	15 November 1937
An Act to amend Part V. of the Administration and Probate Act 1928. (Note: Administration and Probate Act 1928 (19 Geo. V. No. 3632))
Statute Law Revision Act 1937	No. 4485	22 November 1937
An Act to revise the Statute Law and for other purposes.
Administration and Probate (Caveats) Act 1937	No. 4486	22 November 1937
An Act to amend Section Seven of the Administration and Probate Act 1928. (Note: Administration and Probate Act 1928 (19 Geo. V. No. 3632))
Administration and Probate Duties Act 1937	No. 4491	29 November 1937
An Act to continue the operation of Part III. of the Finance Act 1930. (Note: Finance Act 1930 (No. 3889))
Audit Act 1937	No. 4494	29 November 1937
An Act to amend Section Thirty-six of the Audit Act 1928. (Note: Audit Act 1928 (19 Geo. V. No. 3640))
Financial Emergency (Grants and Funds) Act 1937 (repealed)	No. 4496	29 November 1937
An Act to further amend Part IV. of the Financial Emergency Act 1931. (Note: Financial Emergency Act 1931 (No. 3961)) (Repealed by Treasury Legislation (Repeal) Act 2005 (No. 73 of 2005))
Air Navigation Act 1937	No. 4502	29 November 1937
An Act to provide for the Application of the Commonwealth Air Navigation Regulations to and in relation to Air Navigation within the State of Victoria.
Unemployment Relief Loan and Application Act 1937 (repealed)	No. 4507	6 December 1937
An Act to amend Section Three of the Unemployment Relief Loan and Application Act 1932. (Note: Unemployment Relief Loan and Application Act 1932 (No. 4097)) (Repealed by Treasury Legislation (Repeal) Act 2005 (No. 73 of 2005))
Port Melbourne (Aircraft Agreement) Land Act 1937	No. 4508	13 December 1937
An Act to ratify and validate an Agreement made between the Commissioner of Crown Lands and Survey (Note: The Commissioner of Crown Lands and Survey was a ministerial department of the Government of Victoria with responsibility for Crown land.) The Melbourne Harbor Trust Commissioners and the Commonwealth Aircraft Corporation Proprietary Limited (Note: The Commonwealth Aircraft Corporation was an aircraft manufacturer.) and to make provision for carrying the said Agreement into effect and for other purposes.
Public Service (Transfer of Officers) Act 1937 (repealed)	No. 4511	13 December 1937
An Act to provide for the Transfer to the Public Service of Officers of the Forests Commission and the State Rivers and Water Supply Commission and for other purposes. (Repealed by Public Service Act 1946 (No. 5124))
St. Vincent's Hospital Land Act 1937	No. 4515	20 December 1937
An Act to provide for the Revocation of the Reservation of certain Land in the City of Fitzroy permanently reserved as a Site for Hospital Purposes and to provide for the Grant of the said Land to the Mother Rectress and certain other Members of the Religious Order known as the Sisters of Charity administering the Affairs of St. Vincent's Hospital.
Triholm and Strzelecki Railway (Dismantling) Act 1937 (repealed)	No. 4518	20 December 1937
An Act to provide for the Dismantling of the Section of the Koo-wee-rup to McDonald's Track Railway between Triholm and Strezlecki and for other purposes. (Repealed by Transport Act 1983 (No. 9921))
Darling to Glen Waverley Railway Construction Act 1937	No. 4522	20 December 1937
An Act to make provision with respect to the Reduction of the Liability of the Darling to Glen Waverley Railway Construction Trust, to terminate the Levying by the said Trust of Betterment Rates and Railway Construction Rates, to provide for the Payment of certain Sums to the said Trust by certain Municipal Councils and for the Appointment of Receivers to wind up the Affairs of the said Trust, and for other purposes.
	No. 4532	24 December 1937
An Act to apply a sum out of the Consolidated Revenue to the service of the year ending on the thirtieth day of June One thousand nine hundred and thirty-eight and to appropriate the Supplies granted in this and the last preceding Session of Parliament.
Caulfield Land Act 1937	No.	
Closer Settlement Act 1937	No.	
Country Roads (Borrowing) Act 1937	No.	
Country Roads (Murray Diversion) Act 1937	No.	
Country Roads Board Fund Act 1937	No.	
Dairy Produce Act 1937	No.	
Financial Emergency (Company Mortgages) Act 1937	No.	
Financial Emergency (Mortgages) Continuation Act 1937	No.	
Fire Brigades Act 1937	No.	
Goods Act 1937	No.	
Health (Housing) Act 1937	No.	
Housing Act 1937	No.	
Income Tax (Rates) Act 1937	No.	
Justices (Enforcement of Orders) Act 1937	No.	
Land Tax Act 1937	No.	
Landlord and Tenant (Rent Reduction) Amendment Act 1937	No.	
Landlord and Tenant (Rent Reduction) Continuation Act 1937	No.	
Maintenance (Widowed Mothers) Act 1937	No.	
Medical Act 1937	No.	
Melbourne and Metropolitan Board of Works (Contributions) Act 1937	No.	
Mines Act 1937	No.	
Newmarket Sheep Sales (Amendment) Act 1937	No.	
Public Account Advances (Amendment) Act 1937	No.	
Public Account Advances Act 1937	No.	
Public Works Loan Application Act 1937	No.	
Railway Loan Application Act 1937	No.	
Railways Act 1937	No.	
Sewerage Districts (Temporary Reduction of Interest) Act 1937	No.	
Stamps (Increased Duty Continuance) Act 1937	No.	
Stamps Act 1937	No.	
State Electricity Commission (Electrical Approvals Board) Act 1937	No.	
State Electricity Commission (Extension of Undertaking) Act 1937	No.	
State Electricity Commission (Financial) Act 1937	No.	
State Forests Loan Application Act 1937	No.	
Stock and Share Brokers Act 1937	No.	
Stock Medicines Act 1937	No.	
Superannuation (Investment of Fund) Act 1937	No.	
Superannuation (Retirement) Act 1937	No.	
Superannuation Act 1937	No.	
Unemployment Relief Tax (Rates) Act 1937	No.	
Victorian Loan Act 1937	No.	
Water Act 1937	No.	
Water Supply Loans Application Act 1937	No.	
Workers' Compensation Act 1937	No.	

== Sources ==
- "1937 Victorian Historical Acts". AustLII.
