= Tooradin railway station =

Former railway station in Victoria, Australia

Coordinates: 38°10′52″S 145°23′17″E

Tooradin

General information
- Line: South Gippsland
- Platforms: 1
- Tracks: 1

Other information
- Status: Closed

History
- Opened: 1 October 1888; 138 years ago
- Closed: 6 June 1981; 45 years ago (Passenger)

Services
Preceding station	VicRail	Following station
Clyde towards Spencer Street	South Gippsland line	Dalmore towards Yarram
Location

Tooradin was a railway station on the South Gippsland railway line in South Gippsland, Victoria, Australia, the station operated until the closure of the line between Cranbourne Station and Leongatha Station in July 1993 (passenger traffic) although the railway continued to carry freight traffic to Koala Siding near Lang Lang until January 1998.

The line was constructed to Tooradin in 1888.
