= Monomeith railway station =

Former railway station in Victoria, Australia

Coordinates: 38°13′11″S 145°30′55″E

Monomeith

General information
- Line: South Gippsland
- Platforms: 1
- Tracks: 1 (2 till 1994)

Other information
- Status: Closed

History
- Opened: 11 November 1890; 135 years ago
- Closed: 6 June 1981; 45 years ago (Passenger)

Services
Preceding station	VicRail	Following station
Koo Wee Rup towards Spencer Street	South Gippsland line	Caldermeade towards Yarram
Location

Monomeith was a railway station on the South Gippsland railway line in South Gippsland, Victoria, Australia. The station operated until the late 1970s. None of this station remains intact except for a very rusty set of points coming out of the former station, however the track still in reasonable condition.

Despite hopes of re-opening the line between Cranbourne and Leongatha of which this station is part, the Victorian State Government has decided not to reopen the line, as the costs were too high, at $72 million. Improved coach services have been provided instead. Near the former Monomeith Railway Station is the local horse club. There is also the Worri Yallock Creek concrete piles trestle bridge nearby the station site, which is the second largest bridge on the South Gippsland Railway Line.
