= Bolesław Strzelecki =

Polish Roman Catholic priest and martyr

Blessed Bolesław Strzelecki
- Born: 10 June 1886
- Died: 2 May 1941; Auschwitz concentration camp, Poland
- Venerated in: Catholic Church
- Feast: 2 May

Bolesław Strzelecki (1896–1941) was a Polish and Roman Catholic priest. He was imprisoned in the Nazi concentration camp at Auschwitz. He is one of the 108 Blessed Polish Martyrs.

== Life ==
Bolesław Strzelecki was born on June 10 1886 in Panemunė, Lithuania (then under the control of the Russian Empire).

He always tried to help wherever it was needed. And so it remained for him in later years, especially when he became a priest. Priestly Father Bolesław was strewn with many interesting catechetical classes. Among other things, he taught at a vocational school, where girls from poor families studied. He did not receive any remuneration for this work, so as not to inflate the tuition fee. An important feature of priesthood spirituality, Fr. Bolesław was his concern for prisoners. He was very committed to serving as a prison chaplain when not all priests wanted to take on this task. Working on the prison board he had an impact on improving the living conditions of detainees. Ks. Bolesław was always open to other people. He brought spiritual help to all who expected Him to help him. He did not spare his time for the good of others. And he had the opportunity because he worked in many positions and with various social groups. On September 6, 1935, Fr. bishop Jan Kanty Lorek appointed priest Strzelecki as rector of the church of St. Of the Trinity in Radom. He found the church very neglected, dirty and unattended, the worst in Radom. Nomination for this position resulted from the fact that Fr. the bishop knew that only an outstanding priest with the ability to easily contact the faithful and a good organizer could undertake this work. The Clergy was not disappointed in this decision. The renovation of the temple was completed in 1937.

On July 15, 1940, Father Bolesław Strzelecki was nominated as a pastor of the NSJ parish in Glinice in Radom. From the beginning of his work, he brought a lot of new life to the parish. He made the parish office a center of direct contact with parishioners. He prepared a makeshift church so that the parishioners could have a clean chapel in which they met with God. He devoted a lot of time to personal contact with people, he wanted to get to know them well. He led a charity campaign that had a great task to fulfil when the rapid impoverishment of the population came. He organized a kitchen for the poor. He distributed bread, fat and flour to the poorest, which he previously collected from contributions.

During Epiphany 1941, he raised matters related to Poles and war torturers during his sermon. Immediately after, on January 7, 1941, he was arrested when, after celebrating Mass he distributed bread and fats to the poorest in a long queue. He was transported to the Police and Security building at ul. Kościuszki 6. He was interrogated and tortured many times. He was in the prison hospital for some time. From the prison in Radom he was transported to the Auschwitz concentration camp on April 5, 1941. There he was directed to a construction group. In a hungry camp community, he quickly developed charitable care, especially among those close to him, Radomians. He kept his prisoners spiritually and announced their close freedom. He preached that God loves them and now he only experiences their love in the camp. He had the nickname "hunger" in the camp - because he begged for bread for the emaciated and needy. Exhausted by torture, weakened from excessive work, starved and as a result of beating with an oak stick, he died in the camp hospital on May 2, 1941 at 8 am.

== Veneration ==
He was called "Radom St. Francis "and his memory was always alive. On May 6, 1950, the residents of Radom founded and placed a commemorative plaque in the church of NSJ, describing Him as a beloved educator of youth and a priest of great zeal and extraordinary kindness of heart, protector of the poor and unhappy.

To sum up his whole life it should be stated that from the beginning of his work with young people, he instilled in them that no matter what the person has in their minds, but important, what kind of person they are. However, in the parish work, he tried with all his heart, all knowledge and skill to direct the parish in such a way as to lead everyone to salvation and the work of building the temple to visible effect. Unfortunately, this work was brutally interrupted during the war, and thus its continuation was delayed.

He did not have time for himself, to save his deteriorated health with sacrificial work and illness, but he gave every moment of his priestly life for God and acquiring faithful to God and the national cause. He was quiet and humble, he did not seek to satisfy his ambitions, he did not seek honors. He humbly accepted his illness and everything that happened to him in the camp, always on God's will. Because he died in the camp, he has no grave. The memorial plaque is located on the family grave in Jastrzębie near Szydłowiec, where many people worship him. Our parishioners also made pilgrimages to this place for several years. The priest from the war years has been organizing pilgrimages to Auschwitz on May 2 to pray there.

Bolesław Strzelecki was beatified by Pope John Paul II on June 13 1999 in Warsaw. His feast day is May 2.

== See also ==
- List of Nazi-German concentration camps
- The Holocaust in Poland
- World War II casualties of Poland
- Strzelecki (disambiguation)
