= Strzelecki (disambiguation) =

Strzelecki may refer to:

== People ==
- Andrzej Strzelecki, Polish actor and academic teacher
- Bolesław Strzelecki, Polish priest
- Henri Strzelecki, British fashion designer
- Henry Strzelecki, American musician
- Paweł Strzelecki, Polish explorer and geologist
- Peter Strzelecki, American baseball pitcher

== Places ==
=== Australia ===
==== South Australia ====
- Strzelecki Desert, a desert
  - Strzelecki Desert Lakes Important Bird Area
- Strzelecki Regional Reserve, a protected area
- Strzelecki Track, a road

==== Tasmania ====
- Mount Strzelecki on Flinders Island,
- Strzelecki National Park, a protected area in Tasmania

==== Victoria ====
- Strzelecki Highway, a highway
- Strzelecki railway line, a railway line
  - Strzelecki railway station, a railway station associated with the railway line
- Strzelecki Ranges, a mountain range

=== Poland ===
- Strzelce County (Powiat strzelecki), an administrative region in south-west Poland
- Strzelce Landscape Park (Strzelecki Park Krajobrazowy), a protected area in east Poland

== Fictional character ==
- Sharon Strzelecki, a character on the Australian TV series Kath & Kim
