= Strzelecki railway line =

Former railway line in Victoria, Australia

Strzelecki

Overview
- Status: Dismantled line
- Owner: Victorian Railways (VR) (1922–1959)
- Locale: Victoria, Australia
- Termini: Koo Wee Rup; Strzelecki
- Continues from: Port Albert line
- Former connections: Port Albert line
- Stations: 9 former stations; 3 former sidings

Service
- Type: Former Victorian regional service
- Operator: Victorian Railways (VR) (1922–1959)

History
- Work began: 29 June 1922
- Opened: 29 June 1922
- Completed: 29 June 1922
- Closed: Triholm to Strzelecki on 22 November 1930; Yannathan to Triholm on 7 August 1941; Bayles to Yannathan on 15 April 1950; Koo Wee Rup to Bayles on 4 February 1959

Technical
- Line length: 49.653 km (30.85 mi)
- Num of tracks: Single track
- Track gauge: 5 ft 3 in (1,600 mm) Victorian broad gauge

The Strzelecki railway line was a 49 km (30 mi) steam-era branch railway line in Victoria, Australia. The line opened in June 1922, branching off the former Great Southern Railway (South Gippsland line) at Koo Wee Rup Station. The main line branched off the current Pakenham line at Dandenong, extending out into the South Gippsland region.

== Construction ==
The line was constructed with 60 lb/yd (29.8 kg/m) 'D' steel rail, using sleepers 8 ft 4 in (2,540 mm) long, 9 in (229 mm) wide and 4 1/2 in (114 mm) deep, with nine sleepers being used for every 22 ft 6 in (6.86 m), or 20 sleepers per 45 ft (13.72 m) length of rail, laid on a ballast of sand 6 in (152 mm) deep. Track speed for passenger and freight services was 25 mph (40 km/h).

== Opening and description ==
The Strzelecki line opened on 29 June 1922, serving the farms of the Strzelecki Ranges. Sheep and/or cattle loading facilities were provided at all stations except Heath Hill, with goods loading and storage facilities at all stations except Athlone.

Two years after the line opened, two goods sidings, situated between Koo Wee Rup and Bayles, were provided: Plowrights siding and Water Washed Sand siding. Narrow-gauge tramlines ran from both sidings to the main Koo Wee Rup drain, and were used for transporting river-washed sand to the main line. Both Plowrights and Water Washed Sand sidings closed in 1931.

Bayles was the first station on the line, situated in light scrub just south of the township. The following station was Catani, now just a mound of earth where the platform was. Yannathan platform was 11.5 km from Koo Wee Rup, and Heath Hill was a further 2.4 km along the line. Athlone Quarry Siding, 94.14 km from Melbourne, was opened with the line, but closed three years later. Athlone station was 2.4 km further along the line, followed by Topiram.

Triholm, 106.6 km from Melbourne, became the terminus of the line after the section beyond was closed on 22 November 1930. Beyond Triholm, the line featured steep grades and sharp curves.

The original terminus station at Strezlecki had a 53-foot turntable. After Strzelecki station's closure, no other station on the line was supplied with a turntable, requiring trains to run tender-first in the down direction and returning to Koo Wee Rup engine-first.

== Closures ==
The Strzelecki line turned out to be one of the shorter-lived lines in Victoria. The section between Triholm to Strzelecki closed due to a trestle bridge developing a large sway every time a train ran over it, with the cost of repairs deemed uneconomical in view of the light traffic. The section of track from Yannathan to Triholm was closed on 7 August 1941, after flooding of the Lang Lang River resulted in damage to one of the four trestle bridges over the river. Next to close was the section from Bayles to Yannathan, on 15 April 1950. The line to Bayles was kept open until 4 February 1959 to serve a butter factory.

== Station histories ==
Station	Opened	Closed	Age	Notes
Koo Wee Rup	11 November 1890	24 May 1993	102 years	
Plowrights Siding	1 June 1926	12 May 1931	4 years	
Water Washed Sand Siding	19 December 1925	5 May 1931	5 years	
Bayles	29 June 1922	4 February 1959	36 years	
Catani	29 June 1922	15 April 1950	27 years	
Yannathan	29 June 1922	15 April 1950	27 years	
Heathhill	29 June 1922	7 August 1941	19 years	
Athlone Quarry Siding	October 1922	1925	3 years	
Athlone	29 June 1922	7 August 1941	19 years	
Topiram	29 June 1922	7 August 1941	19 years	During construction known as Warneet
Triholm	29 June 1922	7 August 1941	19 years	During construction known as Topiram
Strzelecki	29 June 1922	22 November 1930	8 years	Also spelt Strezlecki

== See also ==
- List of closed railway stations in Victoria
- Transportation in Australia
- Strzelecki (disambiguation)
