= East Cranbourne railway station =

Planned railway station in Victoria, Australia

East Cranbourne
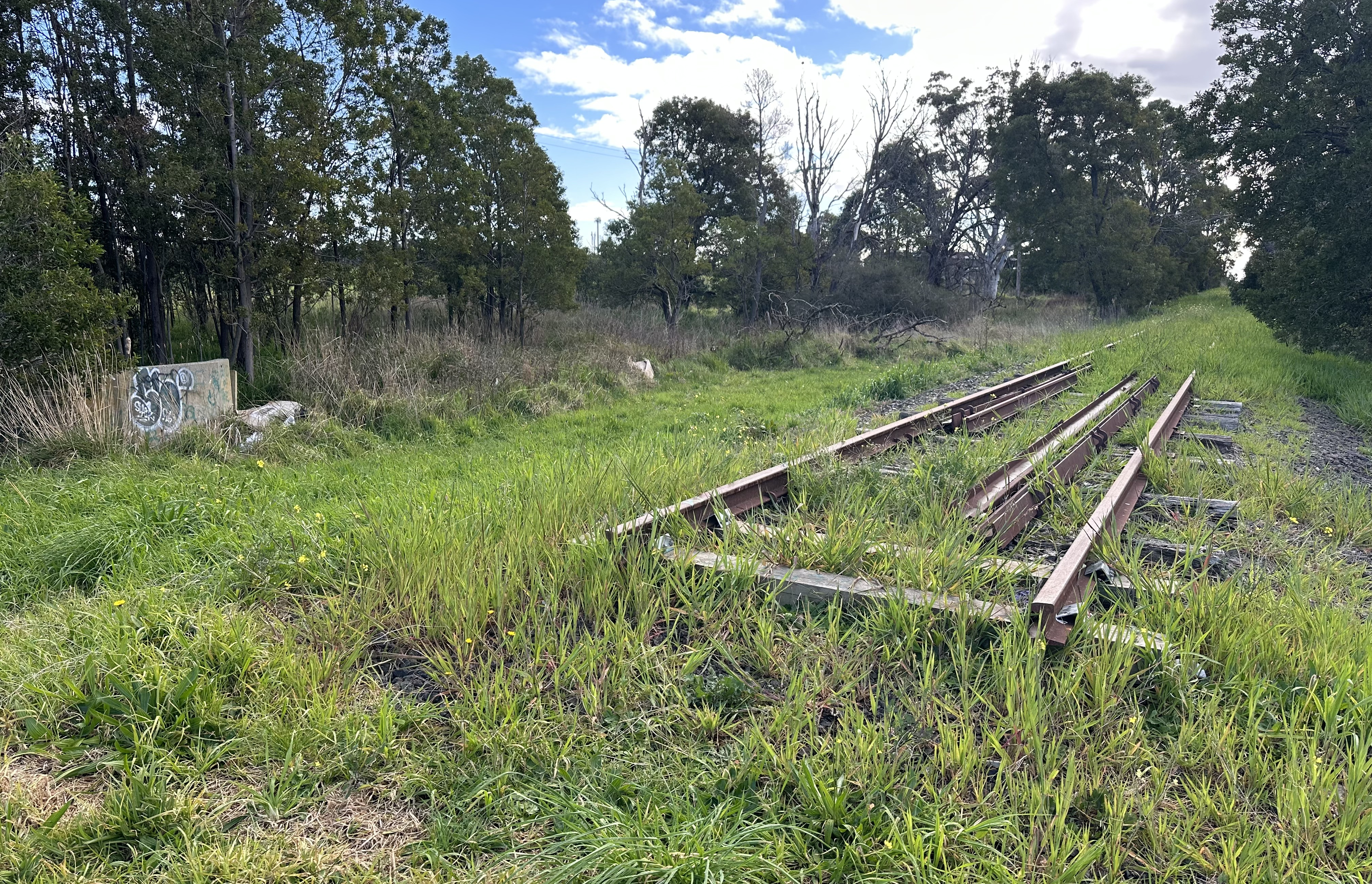
- Proposed site of East Cranbourne station

General information
- Location: Board Oak Drive, Cranbourne East; City of Casey; Australia
- Coordinates: 38°6′40″S 145°17′58″E
- Owner: VicTrack
- Platforms: 2
- Tracks: 2

Other information
- Status: Proposed

Services
Preceding station	Metro Trains	Following station
Cranbourne towards Watergardens or Sunbury via Metro Tunnel	Cranbourne line	Clyde Terminus
Location

East Cranbourne is a proposed railway station on the Cranbourne railway line in the south-eastern Melbourne suburb of Cranbourne East, Victoria, Australia. It would be part of a short extension from the current Cranbourne terminus, with the station to be located west of Broad Oak Drive and north of the Blue Hills retirement village, and adjacent to near the Casey Fields sporting complex. There is a proposed pedestrian underpass to be built along with the station.

The station was promised by both the Australian Labor Party and the Liberal–National Coalition during the 1999 state election campaign, and according to a 2015 article in the Cranbourne Leader, appeared in the 2002-03 State Budget. Separately, the Melbourne 2030 report, published in October 2002, stated that the extension to Cranbourne East was still awaiting funding at that point. The Cranbourne Leader article states that the project was dropped entirely in the 2003-04 Budget. In November 2003, a "Trainlink" bus service was introduced as an alternative, meeting each train at Cranbourne station and running on a largely one-way loop through Cranbourne East. The then state government's Victorian Transport Plan, released in December 2008, listed the station and associated rail extension as a "medium term" project, which was estimated to cost $200 million.

In 2025, Infrastructure Victoria recommended the extension of the Cranbourne Line to Clyde, including Cranbourne East, as part of a proposed 30-year infrastructure plan.
