= Dalmore railway station =

Former railway station in Victoria, Australia

Coordinates: 38°11′44″S 145°26′37″E

Dalmore

General information
- Line: South Gippsland
- Platforms: 1
- Tracks: 1 (in the past, Dalmore had 4 sidings)

Other information
- Status: Closed

History
- Opened: 11 November 1890; 135 years ago
- Closed: c. 1963

Services
Preceding station	VicRail	Following station
Tooradin towards Spencer Street	South Gippsland line	Koo Wee Rup towards Yarram
Location

Dalmore was a railway station on the South Gippsland railway line in South Gippsland, Victoria, Australia. It operated until the late 1970s. All that remains of this station now is the platform mound, however the track is still in reasonable condition.
