= Cranbourne railway station =

Railway station in Melbourne, Australia

Cranbourne
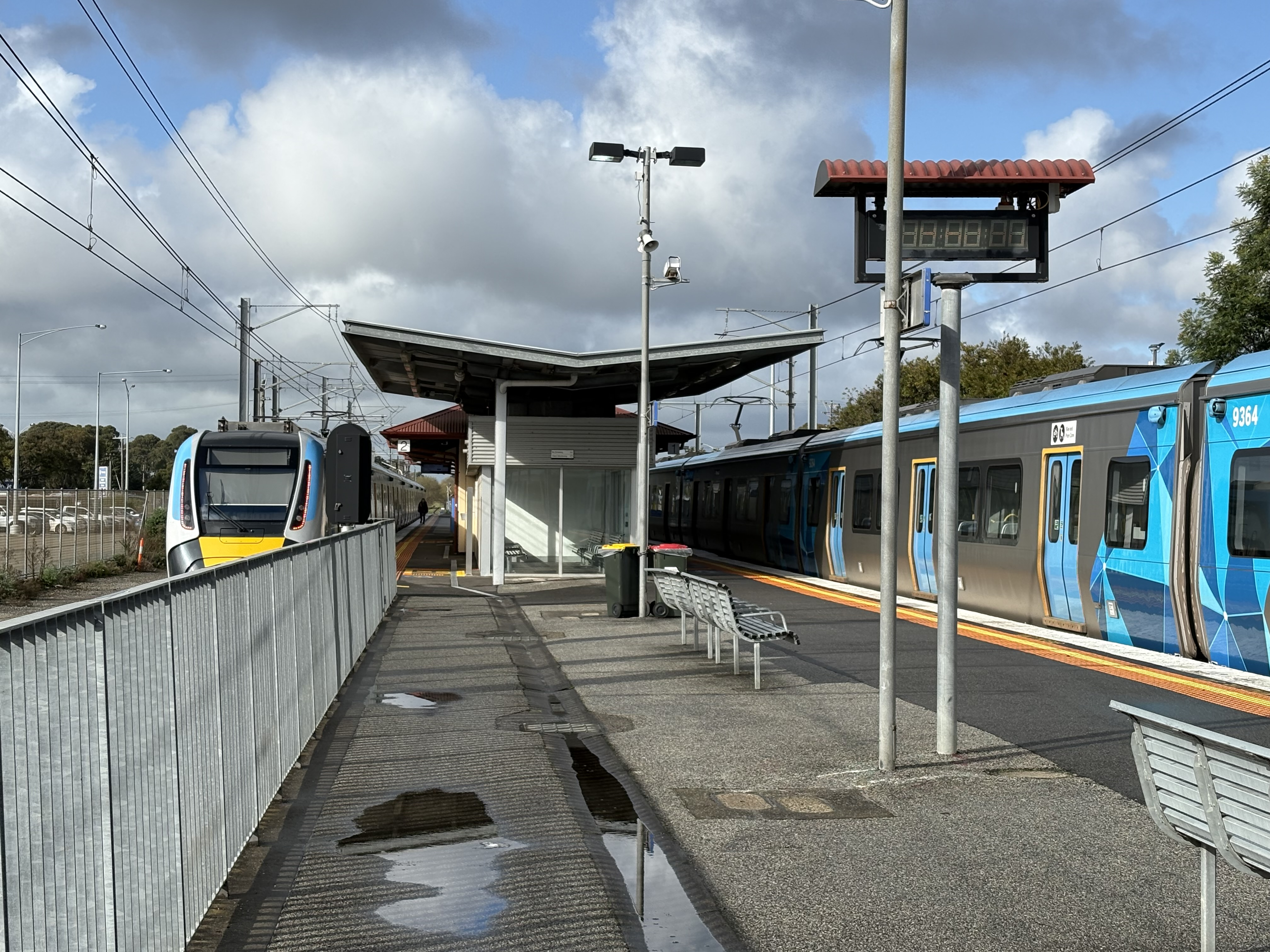
- Southbound view from Platforms 1 and 2, June 2026

General information
- Location: Station Street, Cranbourne, Victoria 3977; City of Casey; Australia
- Coordinates: 38°06′00″S 145°16′52″E
- System: PTV commuter rail station
- Owner: VicTrack
- Operator: Metro Trains
- Line: Cranbourne
- Distance: 45.12 kilometres from Southern Cross
- Platforms: 2 (1 island)
- Tracks: 2
- Connections: Bus; Coach

Construction
- Structure type: Ground
- Parking: 641
- Cycle facilities: Available
- Accessible: Yes — step free access

Other information
- Status: Operational, premium station
- Station code: CBE
- Fare zone: Myki zone 2
- Website: Public Transport Victoria

History
- Opened: 1 October 1888; 138 years ago
- Rebuilt: 24 March 1995; November 2008
- Electrified: March 1995 (1500 V DC overhead)

Passengers
- 2005–2006: 343,546
- 2006–2007: 403,062 ▲17.32%
- 2007–2008: 481,170 ▲19.37%
- 2008–2009: 565,958 ▲17.62%
- 2009–2010: 626,873 ▲10.76%
- 2010–2011: 686,372 ▲9.49%
- 2011–2012: 684,704 ▼0.24%
- 2012–2013: Not measured
- 2013–2014: 600,142 ▼12.35%
- 2014–2015: 643,244 ▲7.18%
- 2015–2016: 751,998 ▲16.9%
- 2016–2017: 819,114 ▲8.92%
- 2017–2018: 772,094 ▼5.74%
- 2018–2019: 817,742 ▲5.91%
- 2019–2020: 773,050 ▼5.46%
- 2020–2021: 407,700 ▼47.26%
- 2021–2022: 462,300 ▲13.39%
- 2022–2023: 787,600 ▲70.36%
- 2023–2024: 949,900 ▲20.61%
- 2024–2024: 1,054,250 ▲10.99%

Services
Preceding station	Metro Trains	Following station
Merinda Park towards Watergardens or Sunbury via Metro Tunnel	Cranbourne line	Terminus
Former services
Preceding station	VicRail	Following station
Lyndhurst towards Spencer Street	South Gippsland line 1888-1981	Clyde towards Yarram
Preceding station	V/Line	Following station
Dandenong towards Spencer Street	South Gippsland line 1984-1993	Koo Wee Rup towards Leongatha
Future Services
Preceding station	Metro Trains	Following station
Proposed
Merinda Park towards Watergardens or Sunbury via Metro Tunnel	Cranbourne line	East Cranbourne towards Clyde
Track layout
Location
- Location within Melbourne

Cranbourne station is a railway station operated by Metro Trains Melbourne and the terminus of the Cranbourne line, part of the Melbourne rail network. It serves the south-eastern suburb of the same name, in Melbourne, Victoria, Australia, and opened on 1 October 1888. The station received electric service from 24 March 1995, and the current station was opened in 2008.

== History ==
Cranbourne opened as a station on the South Gippsland line. Until 24 July 1993, it was served by V/Line trains to Leongatha and beyond. As with the suburb itself, the station got its name from the Cranbourne Inn, established in the mid-19th century by the Ruffy brothers, who were squatters in the area. The area was named either after a town in Berkshire, England or Viscount Cranborne.

Between March 1920 and June 1956, trains regularly operated from sidings about 1 mile (1.6 km) south of the station, dispatching between ten and thirty goods trucks a week, loaded with locally mined construction-quality sand.

In 1959, flashing light signals were provided at the former South Gippsland Highway level crossing, which was at the down end of the station.

In early 1973, a water tank that had been located within the former station yard was removed.

In 1981, flashing light signals were provided at the former Camms Road level crossing, which was located in the up direction from the station. Boom barriers were installed during the electrification of the line.

In November 1993, Train Order Working replaced Electric Staff safeworking to Cranbourne. On 24 March 1995, the electrification and power signalling of the line from Dandenong was commissioned. In 1994, during the electrification project, the original station building was removed by the Mornington Railway Preservation Society. The former goods shed, and a number of tracks, had been removed from the station yard by August of that year.

Between the cessation of passenger services on the South Gippsland line and the opening of electrification, Cranbourne became the terminus of a V/Line operated shuttle service between Dandenong and Cranbourne.

The last regular train beyond Cranbourne ran on 15 January 1998, after which sand trains from Koala Siding (near Nyora) to Spotswood ceased operating.

In April 2008, work started on the construction of six train stabling sidings at the station, to enable more trains to run on the line at peak times without having to duplicate the line. The work was completed in November of that year. As part of that project, the station and bus interchange received an upgrade.

At the 2018 and 2022 state elections, the Coalition promised to extend the Cranbourne line to the suburb of Clyde.

On 30 November 2018, the Level Crossing Removal Project announced that the Camms Road level crossing would be grade separated. On 25 June 2021, designs for the level crossing were released, which involved raising Camms Road over the railway line via an overpass. Construction commenced on the project in early 2023 and, on 30 November of that year, the overpass opened to road traffic.

The Level Crossing Removal Project also managed the duplication of the railway line between Cranbourne and Dandenong. Major work started in 2020, and was completed by 13 February 2022, a year ahead of schedule. The duplication also involved a new timetable for the Cranbourne line, with services operating roughly every 10 minutes during the morning peak-hour.

== Platforms, facilities and services ==
Cranbourne has one island platform with two faces and is served by Cranbourne line trains. The station building has a customer service window, two enclosed waiting rooms, and toilets.

Cranbourne platform arrangement
Platform	Line	Destination	Via	Service Type	Notes	Source
1	Cranbourne line	West Footscray, Watergardens or Sunbury	Town Hall	Limited express		
1	Cranbourne line	Dandenong		All stations	Night Network shuttle.	
2	Cranbourne line	West Footscray, Watergardens or Sunbury	Town Hall	Limited express		
2	Cranbourne line	Dandenong		All stations	Night Network shuttle.	

== Transport links ==
Cranbourne Transit operates eight bus routes via Cranbourne station, under contract to Public Transport Victoria:

- 791 : to Frankston station
- 792 : to Pearcedale
- 795 : to Warneet
- 796 : to Clyde
- 798 : Cranbourne Park Shopping Centre – Clyde North via Hardys Road
- 893 : Cranbourne Park Shopping Centre – Dandenong station
- 897 : Clyde North – Lynbrook station (via Cranbourne Park Shopping Centre)
- 898 : to Clyde North

Ventura Bus Lines operates three routes via Cranbourne station, under contract to Public Transport Victoria:

- 760 : to Seaford station
- 841 : Narre Warren North – Cranbourne
- Night Bus 982 : Dandenong station – Cranbourne (Saturday and Sunday mornings only)
