= Strzelecki railway station =

Former railway station in Victoria, Australia

Strzelecki

General information
- Coordinates: 38°19′45″S 145°54′9″E
- Line: Strzelecki
- Platforms: 1, plus a goods platform
- Tracks: 3

Other information
- Status: Closed

History
- Opened: 29 June 1922; 104 years ago
- Closed: 22 November 1930; 95 years ago

Services
Preceding station	Disused railways	Following station
Triholm	Strzelecki line	Terminus
	List of closed railway stations in Victoria	
Location

Strzelecki railway station was the original terminus of the Strzelecki railway line in Victoria, Australia. It was opened on 29 June 1922, following the completion of the line.

== Station facilities ==
Strzelecki was the only station on the line to be fitted with a 53-foot (16 m) turntable. Gangers' facilities at the station were a headquarters, tool shed and departmental residence. Goods facilities included a goods loading platform, goods shed and cattle and sheep yards. Motorised maintenance trolleys were also kept at the station.

== Closure ==
The station was closed on 22 November 1930, after a timber trestle bridge on the section of line between Triholm and Strzelecki developed a significant sway every time a train passed over it. Given the lack of traffic on that section of the line, it was deemed uneconomic to rebuild the bridge, and line beyond Triholm station was closed, having been in operation for only eight years.

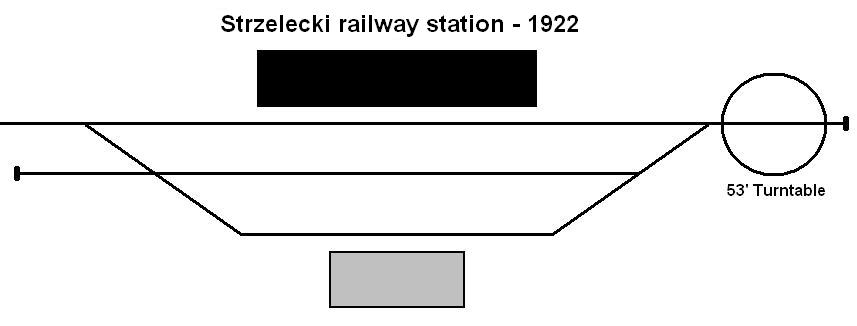

== See also ==
- Strzelecki (disambiguation)
