= Lang Lang River =

Lang Lang Tobin Yallock Creek
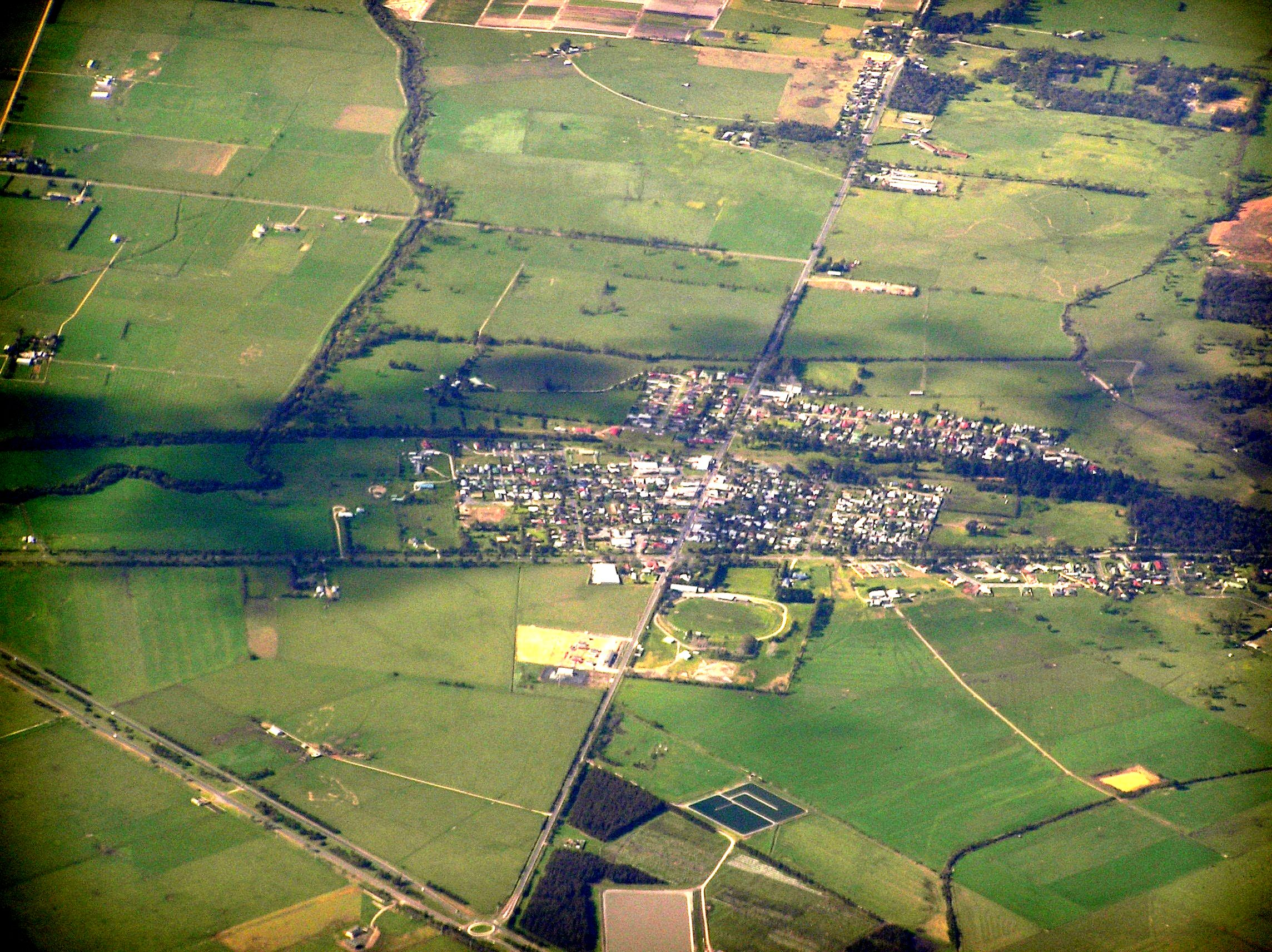
- Lang Lang River, as it flows near Lang Lang, viewed from the southwest

- Location of the Lang Lang River mouth in Victoria
- Etymology: Debated. Either in honour of an early settler named Lang, or from the Boonwurrung language name for the river.
- Native name: Lang Lang Berin (Boonwurrung); Porbin yaluk (Boonwurrung)

Location
- Country: Australia
- State: Victoria
- Region: South East Coastal Plain (IBRA), West Gippsland
- Local government area: Cardinia
- Town: Lang Lang

Physical characteristics
- Source: Strzelecki Ranges
  - location: north of Korumburra
  - coordinates: 38°20′42″S 145°53′58″E
  - elevation: 26 m (85 ft)
- Mouth: confluence with the Western Port
  - location: north of Lang Lang
  - coordinates: 38°15′17″S 145°30′48″E
  - elevation: 0 m (0 ft)
- Length: 10 km (6.2 mi)

Basin features
- River system: Western Port catchment
- Tributaries
  - right: O'Mahony Creek

The Lang Lang River is a perennial river of the Western Port catchment, in the West Gippsland region of the Australian state of Victoria.

== Location and features ==
The Lang Lang River rises in the Strzelecki Ranges in the East Poowong valley, north of the town of Korumburra. The river flows generally northwest, then west, joined by one minor tributary, before reaching its river mouth and emptying into the Western Port, near the town of Lang Lang. The river descends approximately 26 metres (85 ft) over its 10 kilometres (6.2 mi) course.

The river is fairly slow running and does flood occasionally with resultant disruptions to major roads like the South Gippsland Highway and Westernport Road and it can often leave residents stranded in nearby town Lang Lang.

== Etymology ==
The exact origin of the name Lang Lang is debated.

One explanation is that it derives from the Aboriginal Boonwurrung language, in which there are two names for the river recorded: Lang Lang Berin, meaning "stones" or "stony"; and Porbin yaluk, meaning "flowing creek or river".

Other sources claim the river and town are named in honour of an early settler in region, called Lang.

== See also ==
- List of rivers of Australia
