= South Gippsland =

Geographical subdivision of Victoria, Australia

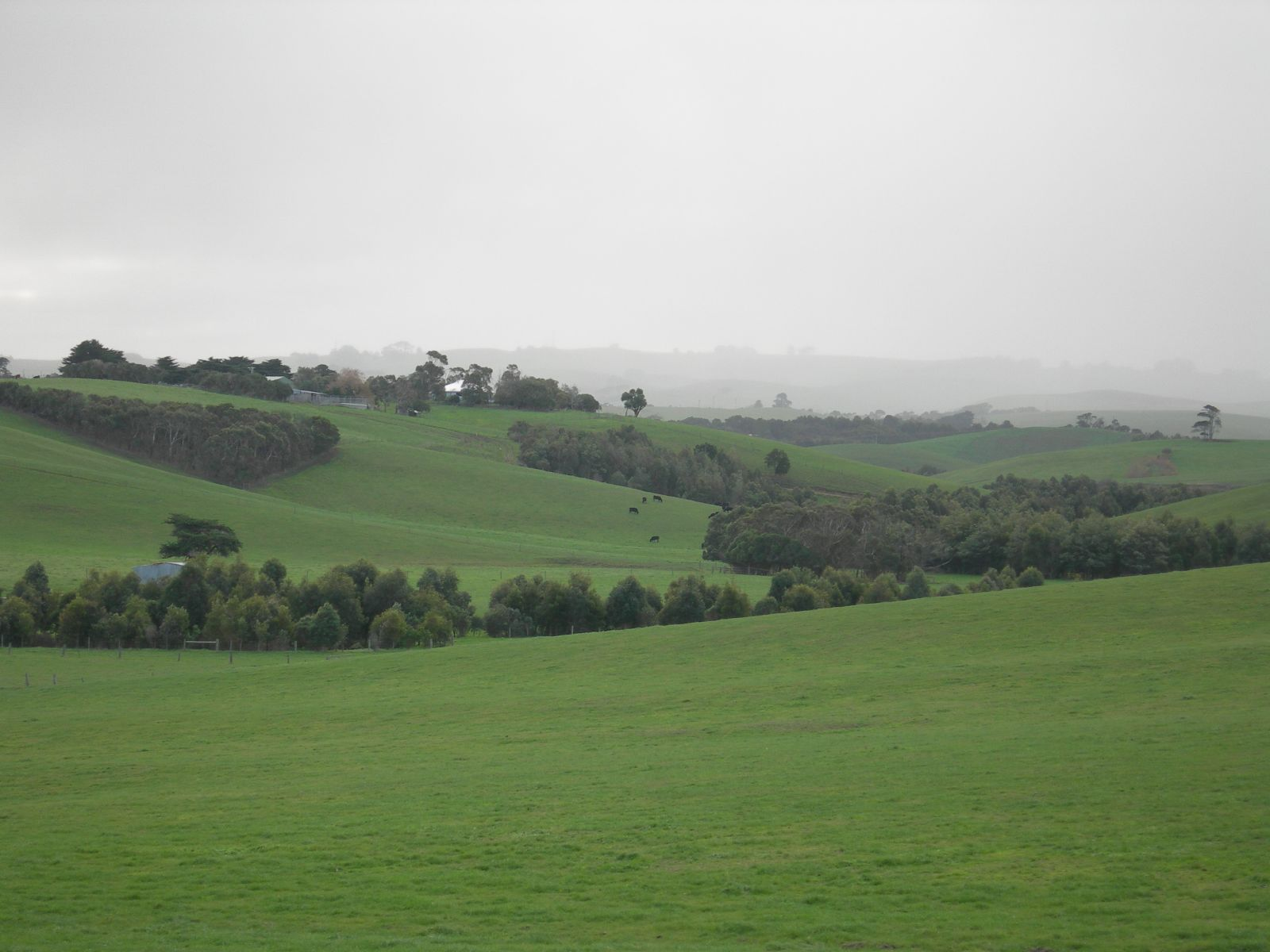
Farmland near Kilcunda

South Gippsland, a region of Gippsland in Victoria, Australia, is a well-watered region consisting of low, rolling hills descending to the coast in the south and the Latrobe Valley in the north. It is part of the larger Gippsland Basin bioregion.

== Geography ==
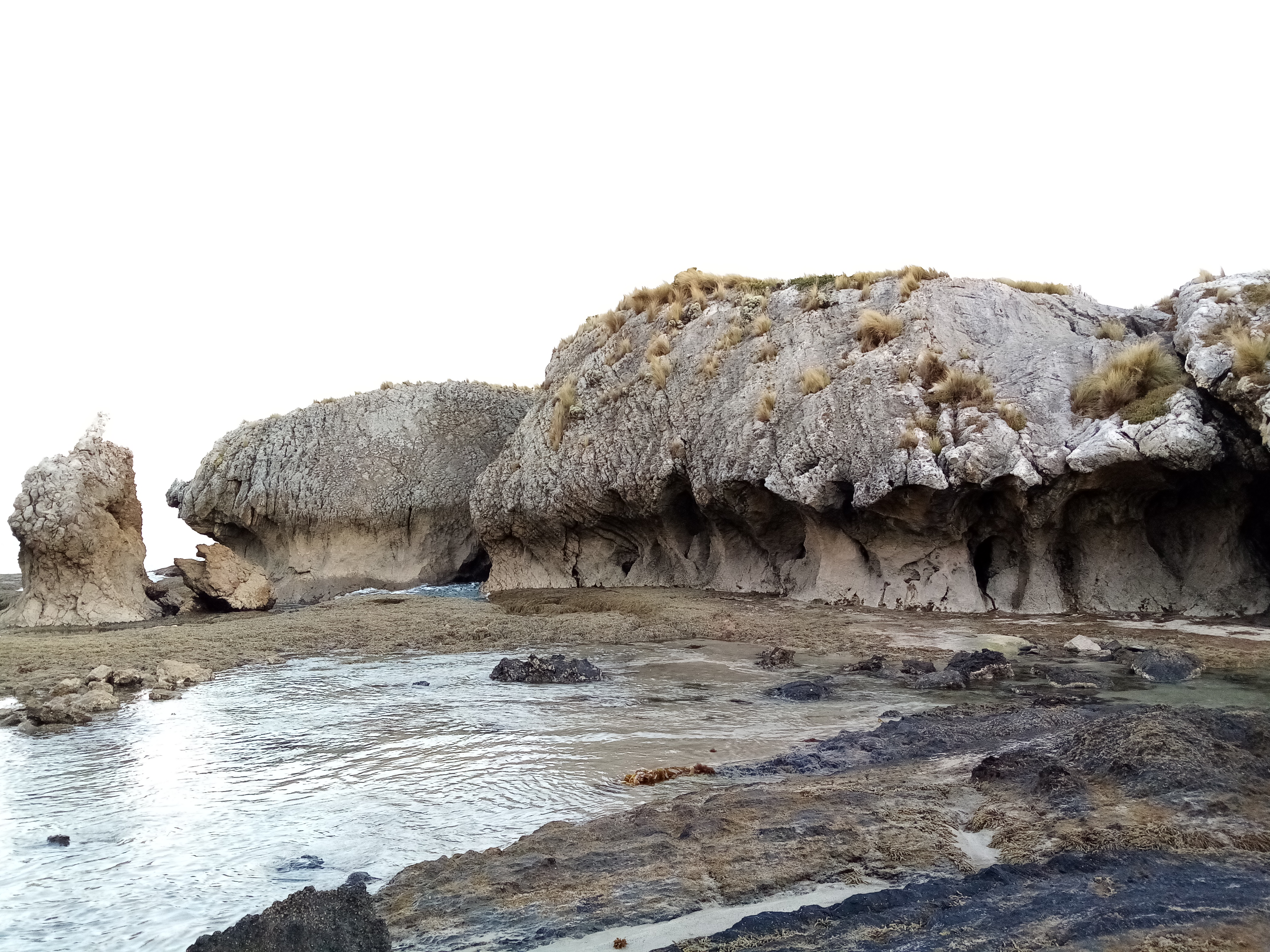
Beach at Walkerville, Victoria, Australia

Low granite hills continue into Wilsons Promontory, the southernmost point of Victoria and mainland Australia. Rivers are generally very short and impossible to dam owing to the lack of potential storage sites, but groundwater of good quality is readily available. The major industries are forestry and dairy farming, and the principal towns include Cowes (on Phillip Island), Leongatha, Korumburra, Wonthaggi and Foster.

Wilsons Promontory National Park features eucalypt forests and rainforests as well as its famous beaches, and is one of the most popular holiday areas in Victoria. Linked to mainland South Gippsland via a bridge at San Remo, Phillip Island is also a major tourist destination, noted particularly for its surf beaches, nightly Penguin Parade and the Phillip Island Grand Prix Circuit.

12,000 years ago, South Gippsland formed part of a land bridge to Tasmania the remnants of which is the Furneaux Group of islands. A ferry operates from Welshpool to Lady Barron Island, part of the Furneaux Group.

== History ==
White settlement of the South Gippsland area mainly took place around 1870 - 1880, when the Melbourne to Sale railway line was in construction.

== South Gippsland Shire Football Association ==
The South Gippsland Shire Football Association ran from 1903 to 1921 and was an Australian Rules football competition.

In 1905, the Alberton Shire FA (49 points) defeated the South Gippsland Shire FA (47 points).

In July 1908, the South Gippsland Shire FA (6.18 - 54) defeated the Koorumburra & District FA (4.14 - 38) at Foster, then in August 1908, the Koorumburra & District FA (8.7 - 55) defeated the South Gippsland Shire FA (3.13 - 31)

In 1922, Koo Wee Rup and Lang Lang joined the Berwick Football Association and Poowong and Nyora joined the Central Gippsland Football Association, which left only Wonthaggi and Wonthaggi Miners and both club's went into recess in 1922, due to no available competition to play in.

Seniors:	South Gippsland Shire FA: Grand Final Scores				
Year	Premiers	Scores	Runner up	Scores	Venue / Comments
1903					
1904	Fish Creek				
1905					
1906	Toora	2.2 - 14	Foster	0.4 - 4	Foster
1907					
1908	Toora				
1909	Fish Creek	verses	Foster		
1910					
1911	Toora	6.1 - 37	Foster	3.3 - 21	
1912	Welshpool	7.12 - 54	Foster	1.3 - 9	Foster/Crowd:1,000
1913	Fish Creek				
1914	Foster	6.14 - 50	Toora	2.6 - 18	Toora
1918	Woorarra	7.6 - 48	Toora	5.3 - 33	Foster
1919	Fish Creek	3.9 - 27	Toora	3.3 - 21	Foster
	Fish Creek*	lost 1919	premiership on a	protest from	Toora
1920	Kooweerup	10.9 - 69	Wonthaggi	7.11 - 53	Kooweerup/$50
1921	Wonthaggi	9.7 - 61	Wonthaggi Miners	4.9 - 33	Wonthaggi
1922					
1923					
1924	Devon	9.13 - 67	Fish Creek	9.9 - 63	Alberton
1927	Wonthaggi	9.7 - 61	Fish Creek	4.7 - 31	Leongatha/$70
	Wonthaggi*	lost 1927	premiership on a	protest from	Fish Creek
1928	Korumburra	9.12 - 66	Wonthaggi Fire Brigade	6.15 - 51	Leongatha
1929	Wonthaggi	9.15 - 69	Korumburra	5.8 - 38	Leongatha
1930	Korumburra	9.11 - 65	Wonthaggi Fire Brigade	9.8 - 62	Leongatha / £83
1931	Leongatha	14.8 - 92	Wonthaggi Town	5.10 - 40	Korumburra
1932	Leongatha	18.23 - 131	Mirboo North	11.5 - 71	Mirboo North
1933	SGFA disbanded				

== Links ==
- 1920 - South Gippsland Shire FA Premiers: Koo Wee Rup FC team photo
- 1938 - South Gippsland FA Premiers: Nyora FC team photo
