= Victorian Railways H class =

Class of Australian 4-8-4 steam locomotives

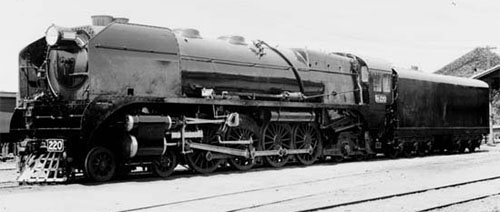
- Builder's photograph of H220, 1941
Type and origin
- Power type: Steam
- Builder: Newport Workshops
- Build date: 1941
- Total produced: 1
Specifications
- Configuration
  - Whyte: 4-8-4
- Gauge: 1,600 mm (5 ft 3 in)
- Driver dia.: 67 in (1,702 mm)
- Length: 92 ft 5 3/4 in (28.19 m)
- Axle load: 23 long tons 5 cwt (52,100 lb or 23.6 t)
- Adhesive weight: 92 long tons 12 cwt (207,400 lb or 94.1 t)
- Loco weight: 146 long tons 10 cwt (328,200 lb or 148.9 t)
- Tender weight: 113 long tons 11 cwt (254,400 lb or 115.4 t)
- Total weight: 260 long tons 1 cwt (582,500 lb or 264.2 t)
- Fuel type: Coal
- Fuel capacity: 9 t (8.9 long tons; 9.9 short tons)
- Water cap.: 14,000 imp gal (64,000 L; 17,000 US gal)
- Firebox
  - Grate area: 68 sq ft (6 m^{2})
- Boiler pressure: 220 lbf/in^{2} (1,517 kPa)
- Heating surface: 4,760 sq ft (442 m^{2})
- Cylinders: 3
- Cylinder size: 21.5 in × 28 in (546 mm × 711 mm)
- Valve gear: Walschaerts; Henschel & Son conjugated valve gear
Performance figures
- Tractive effort: 55,000 lbf (245 kN) at 85% boiler pressure
Career
- Operators: Victorian Railways
- Numbers: H220
- Nicknames: "Heavy Harry"
- Disposition: Preserved on static display, based at Newport Railway Museum

The Victorian Railways H class is a heavy express passenger and goods steam locomotive operated by the Victorian Railways from 1941 to 1958. Intended to eliminate the use of double heading A2 class locomotives on The Overland services on the steeply graded Western line to Adelaide, wartime restrictions led to only one locomotive being built. Nicknamed Heavy Harry, H220 was the largest locomotive ever built in Australia and the largest non-articulated steam locomotive to run on Australian railways.

== History ==
By 1923, the A2 class 4-6-0 locomotives, which dated back to 1907, were frequently double-heading on interstate expresses to Serviceton and Albury, because increasing traffic saw loads exceed the eight-car maximum of a single A2. The Victorian Railways Commissioners recommended considerably more powerful locomotives, that could haul trains of up to eleven cars unassisted over the ruling gradients on those lines. The S class 4-6-2 Pacifics displaced the A2s from North East line express services from 1928 onwards and allowed a faster timetable to be introduced. However, a Pacific-type locomotive was not well suited to the Western line. The section between Melbourne and Ballarat had sharply-curved, steep inclines, the most notorious of which was the 10-mile (16 km), 1 in 48 (2.08%) ruling gradient of the Ingliston Bank. As early as 1923, VR locomotive designers were considering 4-8-2 Mountain-type locomotives for the purpose, along with the use of a third cylinder to provide increased power without exceeding the loading gauge. By tractive effort, the Victorian Railways H class was the third-most-powerful non-articulated steam locomotive to operate in Australia, after the NSWGR D57 4-8-2 and the South Australian Railways 500/500B class.

=== Design brief ===
Detail of the connecting rod for the third cylinder (left), and valve gear stem and crosshead guide, located between the outside cylinders. (right)

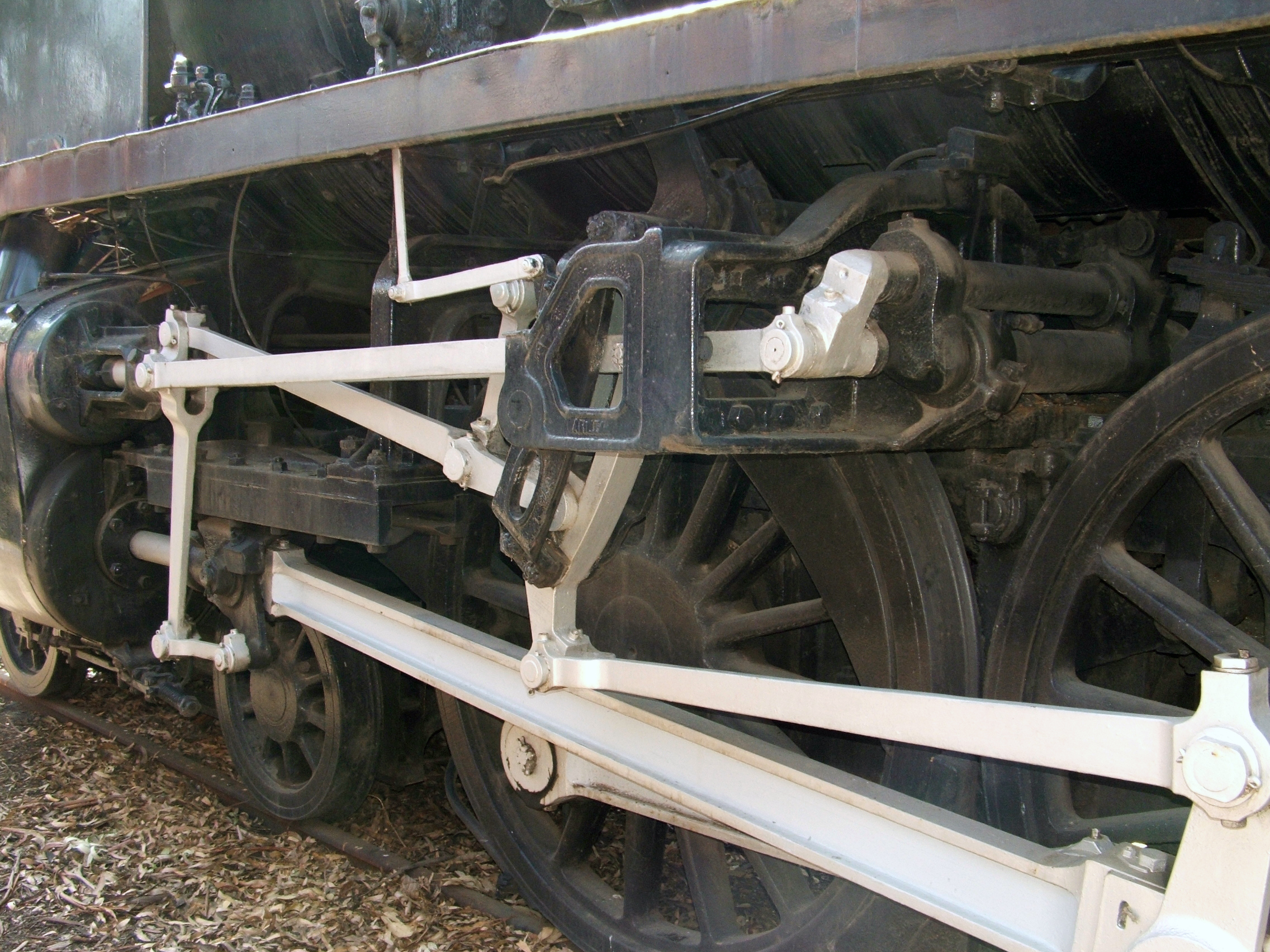
Detail view of the Henschel & Son valve gear mechanism

In 1936, the Victorian Railways Design Office finalised the major design requirements for a steam locomotive that was capable of hauling a load of 550 long tons (560 t; 620 short tons) at a minimum 20 miles per hour (32 km/h) up the Ingliston Bank unassisted. In order to develop the power required, a very large grate and a very large boiler were needed, and the 4-8-4 wheel arrangement enabled that, because its four-wheeled trailing truck could support a large firebox, and four coupled axles would support a large boiler and ensure a good factor of adhesion.

VR designers wanted to improve on aspects of the earlier S class design. Those three-cylinder Pacifics, although capable of hauling heavy loads at high speed, had proved to be relatively maintenance-intensive, particularly with regard to servicing the valve gear and motion for the third (inside) cylinder. The Gresley conjugated valve gear, driven from the valve spindles of the outside cylinder piston valves, was prone to heat expansion and wear, causing timing difficulties, and it required dismantling and removal whenever the centre cylinder valve needed to be serviced.

To overcome those problems, the H class was provided with a significantly different arrangement for its third cylinder. Rather than the Gresley mechanism, it had German Henschel & Son conjugated valve gear apparatus, driven from the combination levers of the Walschaert valve gear for the outside cylinders. The inside cylinder was also positioned further forward of the outside cylinders, and it drove the leading coupled axle, with the outside cylinders driving the second coupled axle.

The H class also became the first VR locomotive to feature a mechanical stoker, and boasted many other modern features, such as roller bearings, hydrostatically controlled load compensating brake gear on the tender, power-operated reversing gear, American-style bar frame construction, thermic siphons, and duplex blast pipes.

=== Production ===
Construction of three H class locomotives at Newport Workshops commenced in 1939 and three sets of frames were manufactured. However, work was halted due to the outbreak of World War II. A shortage of motive power, caused by increased wartime traffic, led to the completion of class leader H220 being authorised and the locomotive entered service on 7 February 1941. Streamlining, similar to that on the S class locomotives, was originally planned, but wartime economies saw that abandoned.

The two additional, partly-built, H class locomotives remained incomplete while wartime production of armaments (and later postwar rebuilding of badly run-down infrastructure) took precedence over express passenger locomotive construction. They were never completed, and the parts were subsequently scrapped.

=== Service life ===
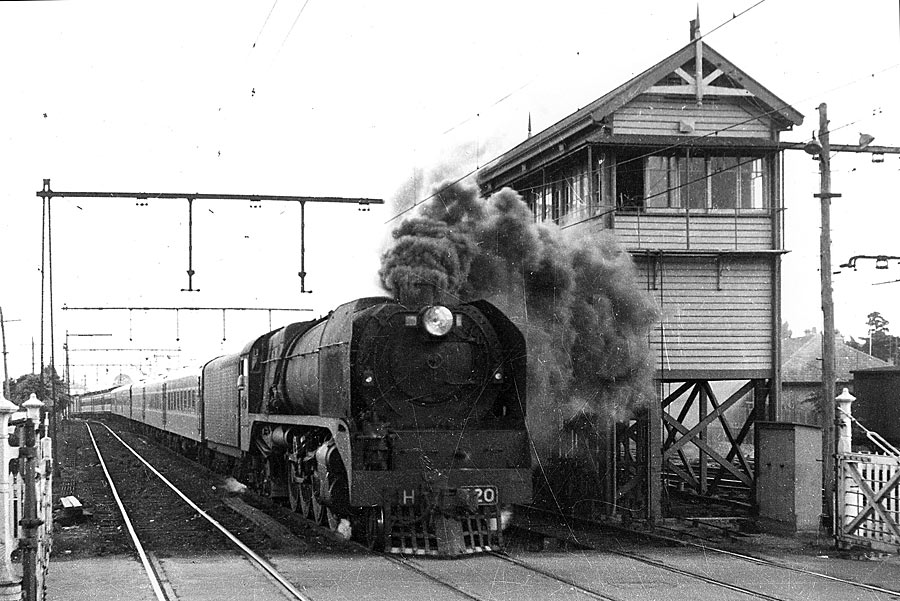
H220 leads the Albury Express out of Melbourne, past the signalbox at Essendon, circa 1949

Although it had been built to work the Western line to Ararat, a number of bridges along the route required strengthening before the H class locomotive, with its 23 1/4 long tons (23.6 t; 26.0 short tons) axle load, could enter regular service on the line. The necessary work was deferred due to wartime restrictions on available resources. Therefore, H220 was put to work on the North-Eastern line to Albury, the only line able to accommodate its loading gauge and high axle load. It mostly hauled fast goods services, but it also powered express passenger services, troop trains and, on the odd occasion when the regular S class Pacific was not available, the Spirit of Progress. That was particularly the case in the postwar period, when S class locomotives were affected by poor coal and reduced availability. H220 gave an indication of its capabilities on one such run of the Spirit in the late 1940s, when it reportedly topped the 5-mile (8 km)-long 1 in 50 Glenroy Bank at 45 mph (72 km/h), three times the typical S class-hauled speed at that same point. It went on to pass Seymour 13 minutes ahead of schedule, and arrived at Albury at 20 minutes ahead of the 10:40 pm scheduled arrival time.

H220 never operated in its intended role as motive power for The Overland, although it did make a brief appearance on the Western line in 1949, when it ran a series of trials on goods trains from Melbourne to Ballarat, being assessed by the VR dynamometer car. Results from the dynamometer car showed that the locomotive developed around 3,300 drawbar horsepower (2,460 kW) at 47.5 mph (76.4 km/h), and a starting drawbar tractive effort of 52,000 lbf (230 kN). The Australian Railway Historical Society, in listing the introduction of H220 among its "100 defining aspects of Australian railways", noted that test results as high as 3,600 hp (2,700 kW) at 50 mph (80 km/h) were recorded, a power output unequalled in Australia during the steam era, and only equalled in the modern era by the National Rail NR class diesel-electric locomotives.

Although intended for express passenger use, H220 was found to be particularly effective when used as a fast goods locomotive. It typically hauled five return trips a week between Melbourne and Wodonga, covering around 1,875 miles (3,018 km) per week, and hauling loads of up to 820 tons (833 t) over the 1 in 50 gradients on that line. By comparison, the maximum loads between Wodonga and Melbourne of the C class 2-8-0 and X class 2-8-2 heavy goods locomotives were 555 and 650 tons respectively. H220 was also able to complete the journey in a much shorter time, with its large tender requiring only a single stop for water, rather than the two stops for water and coal that the other locomotives required. Even after the introduction of mainline diesel-electric traction from 1952 onwards, Victorian Railways' promotional literature featured H220 prominently. One advertisement in Walkabout in November 1953, headed "Trains we are proud of", promoted H220 as "Australia's mightiest engine" and noted its nightly service hauling the 21:25 Albury Interstate Fast Freight.

From all accounts, H220 was a success, even though it spent its life hauling services and operating on a line it was not specifically designed for. Although one-off locomotives are often consigned to a short operating life, or underutilised due to non-standardisation of parts and maintenance requirements, H220 remained in service until finally being superseded by diesel electric locomotives in the late 1950s. In a service life of 15 years 3 months, it clocked up a total of 821,860 miles (1,322,660 km), averaging over 4,800 miles per month.

=== Demise ===
Even after the war, upgrades on the line to Ararat necessary for H class operation were not made, as the VR struggled with a backlog of maintenance work which had built up during the 1940s. When the VR finally embarked on major capital investment in the early 1950s, diesel and electric traction was under consideration. Although diesel locomotives of the early 1950s typically had far lower power outputs than the H class, they could be run in multiple-unit operation, with one crew controlling two or more locomotives. In August 1952, two new B class diesel-electric locomotives established their credentials during trials by hauling a 1,121 long tons (1,139 t; 1,256 short tons) goods train up the Ingliston Bank, and covering in 44 minutes the same distance two A2 class locomotives took to haul a 690-long-ton (700 t; 770-short-ton) load in 67 minutes. The B class locomotives proved their ability to provide the same (if not better) performance as the H class, but without the heavy axle load or the need for upgraded infrastructure. They became the new motive power for not only The Overland, but also mainline goods services. The days of mainline steam locomotives were numbered.

H220 continued in service until it was withdrawn for an overhaul on 20 May 1956. By that time, the C and X class heavy goods locomotives were being progressively withdrawn from service and scrapped, having been made redundant by B class diesel-electric and L class electric locomotives. H220 was stored rather than overhauled, and never returned to service. It was written off the VR locomotive register on 30 April 1958.

== Preservation ==
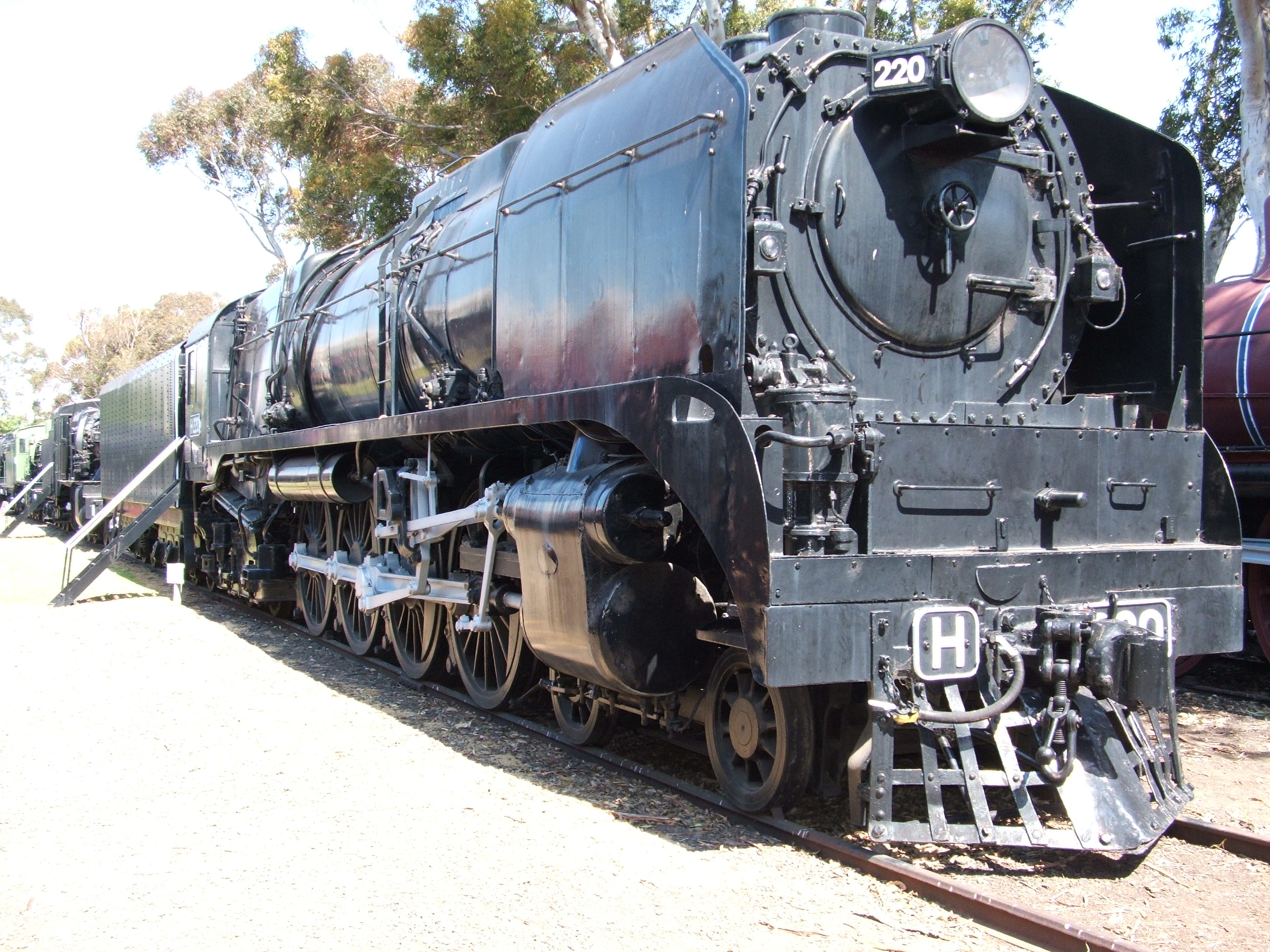
H220, in static preservation at the Newport Railway Museum

H220 survived more-or-less intact until 1960, when the Australian Railway Historical Society successfully lobbied for the establishment of the Newport Railway Museum. H220 entered the museum in 1962, and since this date has been its star exhibit.

In April 2008, 50 years after its official withdrawal from service, H220 was added to the Victorian Heritage Register. Heritage Council chairman Chris Gallagher noted that H220 represented the peak of steam motive power technology in Victoria and warranted the state's highest level of heritage protection. In October 2020, a new roof, announced by local MP Melissa Horne in May 2019, was built over H220 and neighbouring exhibits to protect them from the weather.

It is believed that H220 is the world's only remaining example of a three-cylinder 4-8-4.

H220, as well as other locomotives at the museum, feature in the music video to the song "Next Train Out" by Melbourne hard rock band Ablaze.
