= Victorian Railways X class =

Class of Australian 2-8-2 steam locomotives

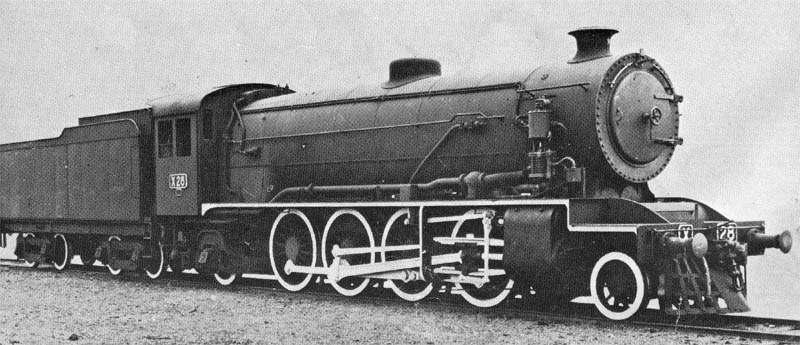
- Newport Workshops photograph of X28, 1929, it has not yet been fitted with lamps or cab windows
Type and origin
- Power type: Steam
- Builder: Newport Workshops
- Build date: 1929
- Total produced: 29
Specifications
- Configuration
  - Whyte: 2-8-2
- Gauge: 1,600 mm (5 ft 3 in)
- Driver dia.: 5 feet 1 5/8 inches (1,565 mm)
- Length: 77 feet 4 1/2 inches (23.584 m)
- Axle load: 19.25 long tons (19.56 t; 21.56 short tons)
- Adhesive weight: 74.25 long tons (75.44 t; 83.16 short tons)
- Total weight: 181.1 long tons (184.0 t; 202.8 short tons)
- Fuel type: Coal
- Fuel capacity: 9 long tons (9.1 t; 10 short tons)
- Water cap.: 8,600 imp gal (39,000 L; 10,300 US gal)
- Firebox
  - Grate area: 42 sq ft (3.9 m^{2})
- Boiler pressure: 205 psi (1,413 kPa)
- Heating surface: 3,107 sq ft (289 m^{2})
- Cylinders: 2
- Cylinder size: 22 in × 28 in (559 mm × 711 mm)
Performance figures
- Tractive effort: 39,360 lbf (175.1 kN); 48,360 lbf (215.1 kN) (with booster) at 85% boiler pressure
Career
- Operators: Victorian Railways
- Numbers: X27-X55
- Disposition: 1 preserved, 28 scrapped

The Victorian Railways X class is a mainline goods locomotive of the 2-8-2 'Mikado' type operated by the Victorian Railways (VR) between 1929 and 1960. They were the most powerful goods locomotive on the VR, aside from the single H class, H220, which was confined to the North East line, until the advent of diesel-electric traction, and operated over the key Bendigo, Wodonga, and Gippsland mainlines.

== History ==
The X class was a development of the earlier C class 2-8-0 goods locomotive, designed to be gauge convertible from 5 ft 3 in (1,600 mm) to 4 ft 8 1/2 in (1,435 mm) standard gauge in the event of the Victorian Railways network being converted to standard gauge. The C class, with a narrow firebox between the frames, could not be easily converted. The X class retained the same cylinder and driving wheel dimensions as the C class as well as its valve gear, but introduced a much larger boiler and a trailing truck behind the rear driving axle.

The 2-8-2 layout of the X class allowed a wide, deep firebox suited to the high ash, low calorific coals from the State Coal Mine typically used for goods haulage. This improved on some key shortcomings of the C class which were regarded as poor steaming and featured a very long 9 ft 7 in (2,921 mm) manually stoked firebox that was difficult to fire and prone to clinkering. The X class was also equipped with a much larger capacity tender of similar design to the S class Pacific introduced in 1928, enabling through runs from Melbourne to Bendigo without intermediate stops to restock the tender.

=== Booster units ===
All but two were built with a Franklin C2 type Booster engine on the trailing truck axle, following a successful trial of a booster on the smaller N class light lines 2-8-2. The booster allowed an additional 9,000 lbf (40 kN) tractive effort at starting and low speeds to increase the hauling power of the locomotive, particularly on heavy grades. X36 and X37 were built without boosters and were rostered for 'plains working' on the relatively flat line between Gheringhap and Maroona stations. X37 was equipped with a booster in March 1932, however X36 was never fitted with one, even though its trailing truck axle was equipped with the necessary pinion gear wheel.

Some engines had their booster units "permanently removed", though in practice some such engines had the boosters disconnected without actually removing them from the trucks. As of April 1958, engines listed as such were 29, 33, 36 (never fitted), 44, 49, 50, 51 and 55. Later reporting noted that X29 was still running with its booster in July 1960, though it is not clear whether it was always in use, or restored to use after a period of non-service, though it is likely that it was restored using parts from some of the class members that had since been permanently withdrawn and scrapped.

=== Production ===
The success of the original eleven locomotives delivered in 1929 (X27 to X37) led to further examples being built. X38 was assembled in 1937 from spare parts, helping to create work for workshops staff at a time of high unemployment. A further seven X class locomotives were built in 1938, a followed by a further six in 1942–43, with a final four X class delivered by 1947.

==== Clyde Engineering cancelled order ====
In May 1950, the Victorian Railways commissioned Clyde Engineering to provide a further fifteen X Class locomotives. Two months earlier the Commissioners had discussed difficulties in sourcing a reliable coal supply, and had already arranged for half the upcoming J Class fleet to be delivered as oil burners, but they were also aware that this use of oil burning was far less efficient than diesel locomotives. At the same time, Clyde had been contracted to provide 17 of what would later be known as the B Class diesel electric locomotives and the X Class order had not yet started construction, so the X Class order for £1,021,695 was cancelled and a further £51,501 paid, to bring the B Class order up to 26 locomotives. Had the fifteen additional X Class engines been delivered, they would have featured Witte-style smoke deflectors like the J and R Class engines (probably painted red), a longer dome over the boiler, and a slightly shorter but taller tender to maintain the 9 tons coal, 8,600 gallons water capacity. Newsrail October 2025 p. 399 includes a photograph of a scale model of the hypothesized locomotive, with a tender based on X32's Stug equipment for precipitated brown coal.

=== Regular service ===
The X class locomotives were described as always the master of their task, fast steaming and easy riding. With their relatively heavy axle load, the X class was initially confined to the Bendigo and Wodonga lines, with the occasional journey on the Ballarat or Geelong lines. In later years after they were allowed to cross the Flinders Street Viaduct between Spencer Street and Flinders Street stations, they worked goods trains of over 1,000 tons between Morwell and Melbourne, and even worked the South Gippsland line to Korumburra frequently until the late 1950s and as far as Foster.

Even in its original form, the X class locomotive was a marked improvement on the C class in terms of performance. Comparative tests between prototype X27 and C class locomotive C18 revealed that the X developed an indicated horsepower output of 1,220 horsepower (910 kW) between 30 and 36 mph (48 and 58 km/h), compared with 950 hp (708 kW) at 21 miles per hour (34 km/h) for the C. With a later revised boiler design and other changes improving performance and increasing indicated horsepower to as much as 1,620 hp (1,208 kW), the X class was renowned for its ability to be driven extremely hard. As with the C class, it was also occasionally pressed into mainline passenger service on key intercity routes, particularly during Christmas and Easter peak times.

By 1943, X class locomotives were each averaging 29,100 miles (46,800 km) per annum.

=== Design improvements ===
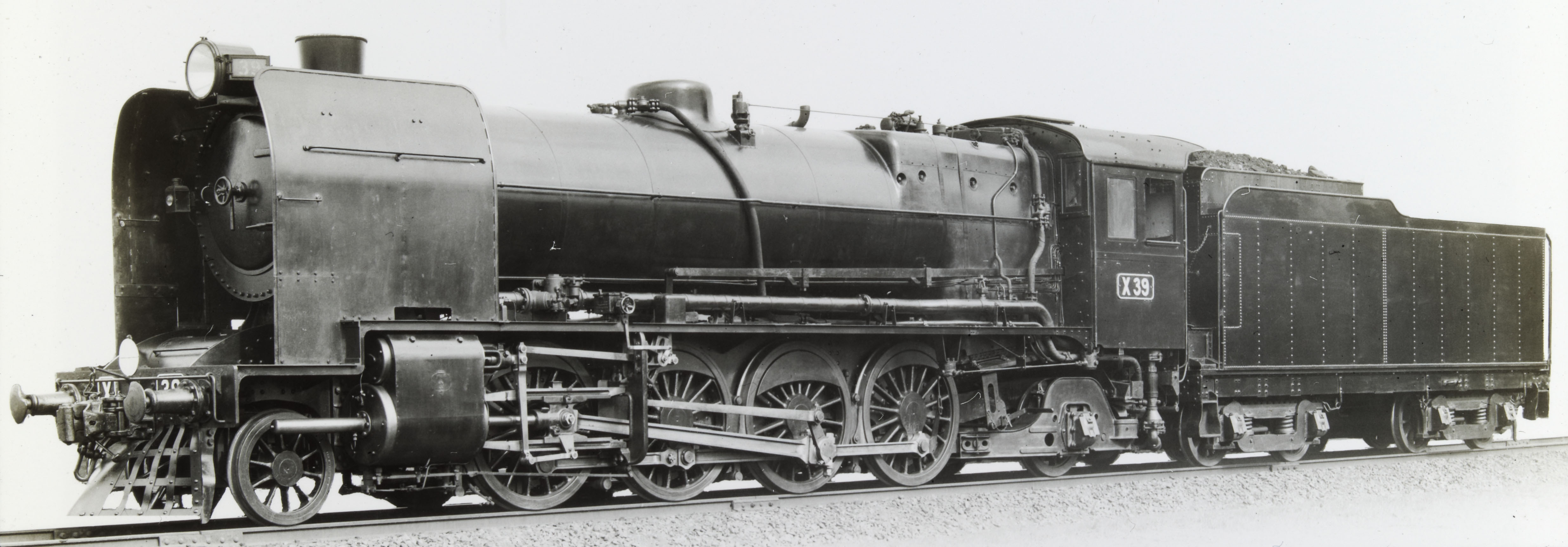
X39, built new in 1938 with visible design changes including Modified Front End 'flowerpot' funnel, smoke deflectors, and Belpaire firebox with combustion chamber. The tender is believed to be a former S class tender.

The X class, in common with all broad gauge VR steam locomotives built from 1907 onwards, underwent design modifications to the smokebox draughting and blastpipe dimensions referred to as 'Modified Front End', as well as other improvements such as the fitting of smoke deflectors, Automatic Staff Exchange apparatus and cross-compound air compressors. The copper firebox round-top boilers the original eleven locomotives were built with, prone to priming if too much water was carried, were replaced with all-steel boilers featuring Belpaire pattern fireboxes. The new boiler design also featured a combustion chamber and thermic syphons to increase power and efficiency. The VR was so satisfied with the performance of the revised X class all-steel boiler design, a shortened barrel version was considered during the design phase of the R class 4-6-4 express passenger locomotives of 1951.

X38 introduced a new welded fabricated trailing truck in place of the cast steel units previously imported from the Commonwealth Steel Company of Illinois, USA. This design innovation was fitted to all subsequent examples built.

In July 1938, X39 became the first VR locomotive to be equipped with A6-ET brake equipment, a feature subsequently incorporated into all new VR steam locomotives.

=== Experimental use of pulverised brown coal ===
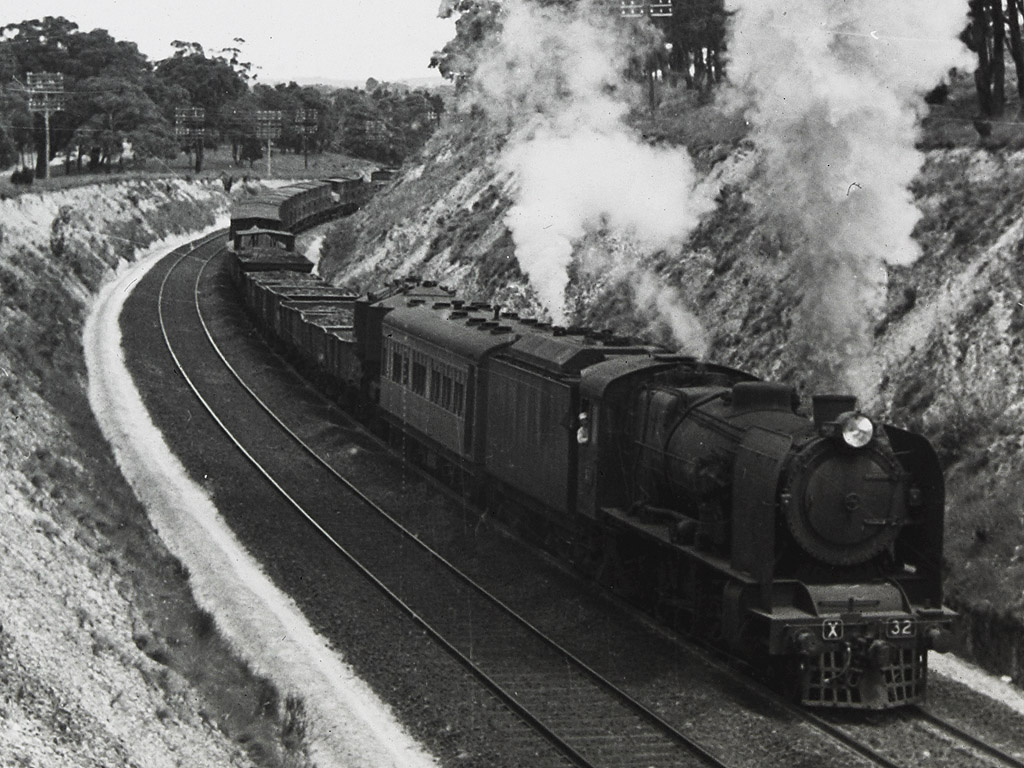
X32, after conversion to PBC firing, on a test train with the VR and South Australian Railways joint stock Dynamometer car. Note plume of steam from the turbine motor on the tender, which drove a conveyor screw and blower to force coal dust into the firebox.

In 1949, the VR was faced with dwindling supplies of black coal due to industrial action on NSW coalfields and Victorian black coal reserves becoming exhausted. Large numbers of locomotives were converted to fuel oil operation, but as a further step X32 was experimentally fitted with German 'Stug' (Studiengesellschaft) equipment in a specially modified tender for the burning of pulverised brown coal (PBC), a fuel in potentially abundant supply in Victoria.

The trial was successful with the locomotive noted for its clean running and the elimination of smoke, spark hazard and spark arrestor cleaning. With the grate automatically stoked via a tender-mounted conveyor screw and blower motor, it was now possible to harness the full steam-raising potential of the locomotive's boiler without the stamina of the fireman being a limiting factor. The steam requirements for both engine and booster were able to be met for unlimited periods at maximum steam pressure even against the action of both injectors. Comparative performance tests with black coal-fired X30 revealed that X32 was able to generate a drawbar horsepower output of 1,440 hp (1,074 kW) at 30 miles per hour (48 km/h), exceeding by 5 to 10% that which could be produced by X30 with good quality Maitland or Lithgow coals. The locomotive gained a reputation for both speed and dependability. On one occasion, X32 hauled a 621-long-ton (631 t) load between Seymour and Melbourne in 105 minutes, where the working timetable for a full 650-long-ton (660 t; 730-short-ton) load allowed 147 minutes. On 4 April 1951 it replaced a defective S class locomotive in hauling the Spirit of Progress from Wallan to Melbourne, taking 43 minutes to cover the same distance the S class-hauled train would normally cover in 40 minutes, despite having to start the train from standstill and running with a lower permissible maximum speed.

As early as July 1951 the Victorian Minister for Transport announced that the remaining 28 X class locomotives were to be converted to PBC operation. In September 1951 the Victorian Railways were considering purchasing 30 sets of PBC equipment for X Class conversions, and in early 1952 they and the State Electricity Commission of Victoria were exploring a wider project to convert 35 locomotives per year, to a total of 214 engines across the X, R and N classes (including engines then on order). The Victorian Railways went on to convert express passenger locomotive R707 to PBC operation, and may well have converted the upcoming fifteen additional X Class locomotives from Clyde Engineering to PBC at a later date. At the time, the State Electricity Commission was expecting to generate enough PBC to reliably fuel about thirty locomotives by 1954. However, by 1957 the price of PBC had doubled against a fall in the price of fuel oil and the increased availability of high quality NSW coal at good prices. This, coupled with the demonstrated efficiency and economical operation of B class mainline diesel-electric locomotives introduced in 1952, made the high cost of installing storage and transport facilities for PBC uneconomic, particularly when combined with the additional maintenance costs associated with its PBC delivery equipment at and between the tender and firebox. The additional X class order had already been cancelled in favour of additional B class locomotives, and in January 1957 Victorian Railways announced the discontinuation of PBC operation and the intention to return X32 and R707 to black coal firing. X32, taken out of service in May 1956 pending repairs, was instead scrapped in August 1957.

=== Demise ===
The rapid dieselisation and electrification of Victorian Railways' mainline operations in the 1950s meant that the X class was rendered obsolete as the new B class diesel-electrics and L class electrics proved their superiority over steam for heavy freight work. Withdrawals commenced in 1957 and accelerated with the delivery of the S class diesel-electric locomotives from August that year, with the diesel fleet by then large enough for the X class to be displaced from mainline goods haulage. A report comparing total operating costs per mile (including fuel, oil, crewing, maintenance, depreciation and interest) for locomotives in freight service found an S class diesel-electric cost 68.41 pence per mile versus 261.01 pence per mile for the X class steam locomotive. The X class locomotives were increasingly relegated to short-hop transfer goods haulage, a role that as mainline goods locomotives they were unsuitable for. On 12 April 1957 X43 became the first of the class to be scrapped, and by the end of 1960 all were withdrawn and all but one had been scrapped.

== Preservation ==
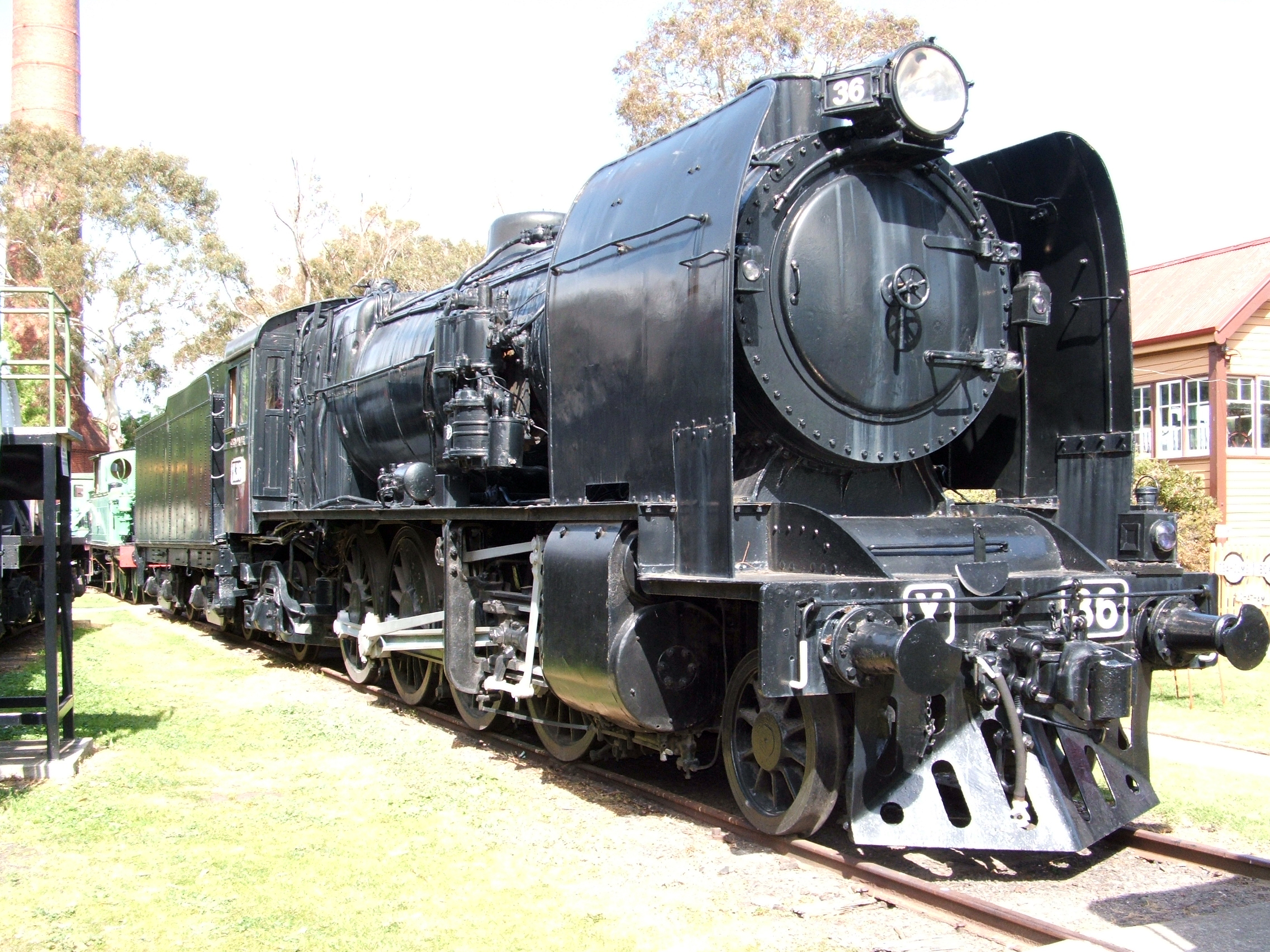
Preserved X36 at the Newport Railway Museum

Efforts by railway enthusiasts to save the last remaining X class locomotive from being scrapped played a pivotal role in the establishment of a railway museum and the preservation of examples of many other VR locomotive classes.

In September 1960, the VR announced that the remaining X, D1, D2, D4, E and Y class locomotives were to be withdrawn within the next six months. Members of the Australian Railway Historical Society (ARHS) and a number of VR employees, aware that these locomotive classes were about to vanish just as the S class had six years earlier, began making approaches to the Victorian Railway Commissioners suggesting that an example of each of the various classes still in existence be preserved in a railway museum. On 17 November, the last two X class locomotives in service were withdrawn, and X36 hauled X29 dead-attached back to Newport Workshops where both were to be scrapped. By the end of the year X29 was already largely cut up, and VR employees sympathetic to preservation efforts had moved X36 to the back of the scrapping row to buy it time as negotiations continued over its future. In February 1961 the ARHS met with the VR and succeeded in securing a temporary hold on X36's scrapping until 1 April 1961. When that date passed without resolution, X36 was again moved back to the scrapping row. However, the locomotive was saved when the office of the VR Chief Mechanical Engineer intervened at the eleventh hour and deferred the scrapping.

In May 1961, the VR Commissioners accepted the ARHS proposal for the museum and provided locomotives, land, and tracks for its establishment. The Railway Museum opened to the public on 10 November 1962 and X36, withdrawn after 741,609 miles (1,193,504 km) of service, is today preserved alongside dozens of other former VR locomotives and rolling stock.

In April 2006, the boiler from scrapped locomotive X30, obtained by CSR Limited in 1959 to provide steam for Australia's first particle board factory in Oberon, New South Wales, was finally retired from service after 47 years service and allocated to a preservation group.
