= Newport Railway Museum =

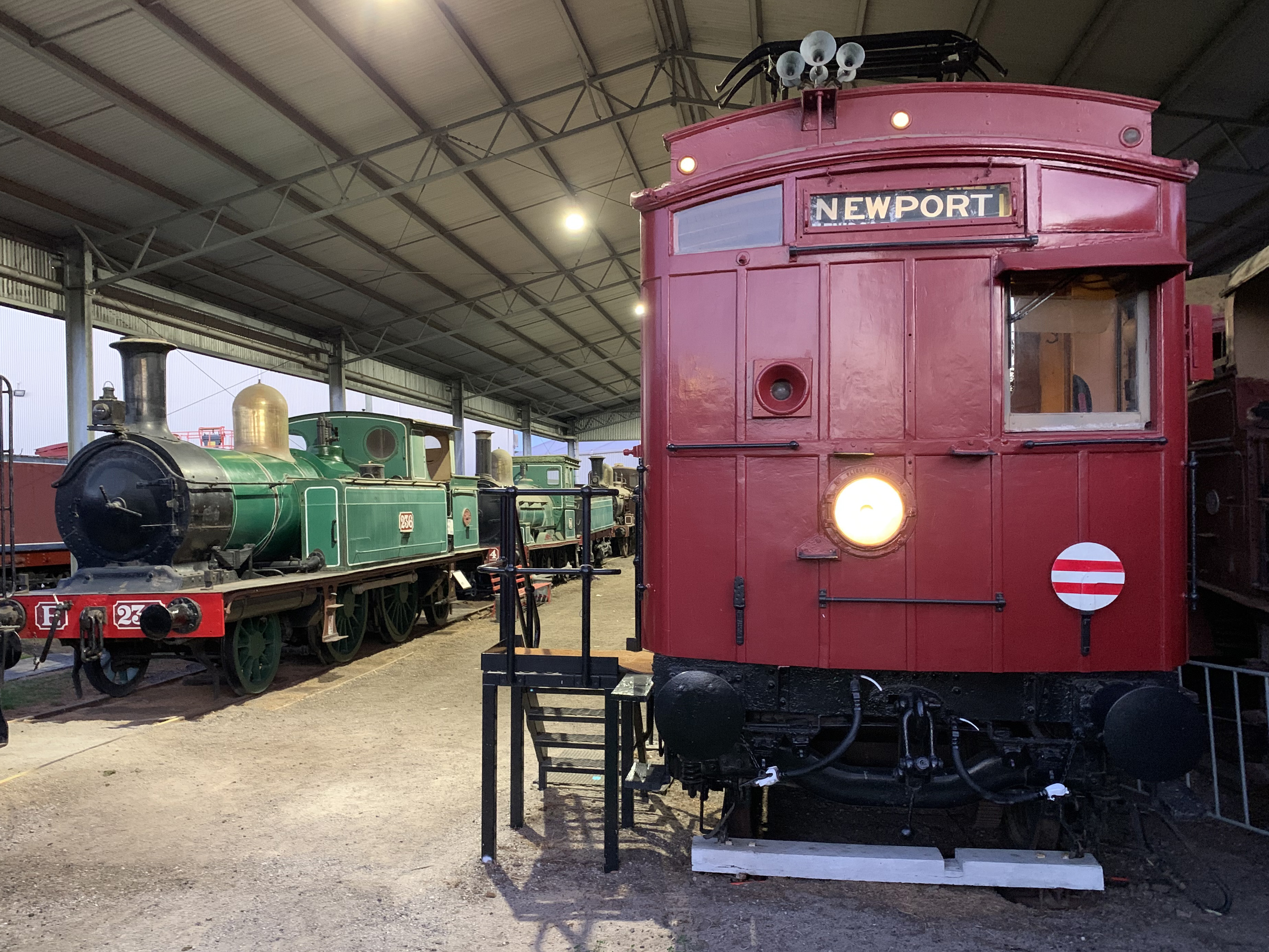
- Steam locomotive E 236 and electric suburban carriage 8M on display at the museum, 2023
- Established: 10 November 1962
- Location: 26 Champion Road, Newport, Victoria
- Coordinates: 37°51′22″S 144°53′12″E
- Type: Railway museum
- Website: Official Site

The Newport Railway Museum is located on Champion Road, Newport, Victoria, near the North Williamstown station.

== History ==
The museum opened on 10 November 1962, after the Australian Railway Historical Society (ARHS) Victorian Division was allocated space at Newport Workshops by the Victorian Railways to develop a collection of key examples of steam locomotives that were then in the process of being replaced by diesel and electric locomotives. By the late 1980s, the early diesel and electric locomotives that had replaced steam traction were themselves nearing end of life, and the museum expanded its collection to incorporate a number of key examples.

Following a safety audit by VicTrack, the landlord and owner of most of the exhibits, the museum closed in February 2010. After various improvements, it reopened in March 2014.

On 16 June 2020, it was announced that the ARHS had withdrawn from the operation of the museum and a new group, Newport Railway Museum Inc., formed by museum volunteers, had entered into an arrangement with VicTrack to take over the Museum site lease.

=== Site improvements ===
In recent years, projects have been undertaken to construct roof canopies to cover the exhibits and protect the collection from the elements.

- In 2016, a project was announced to construct a 693 m^{2} (7,460 sq ft) roof canopy over four wooden passenger carriages and three of the oldest steam locomotives on the site; this project was completed in 2017.
- In 2019, the Victorian Government announced a project to construct a roof canopy to protect the heritage-listed locomotive H220 Heavy Harry. A 1,134 m^{2} (12,210 sq ft) structure that covered H220 and several adjacent exhibits was completed in 2020. In announcing the completion of the second roof canopy, Newport Railway Museum stated its intention to continue to construct further roofing over remaining exhibits to ensure their preservation.
- In late 2023, the second canopy was further extended by 567 square metres (6,100 sq ft) to bring several additional exhibits under cover, including steam locomotive C10, the last-remaining member of a class the museum describes as representative of a step change in the haulage of freight in Australia.
- In 2025, the museum announced the expansion of its site to take in additional land for future expansion of the collection. Two objects of cultural significance, the Newport Workshops war memorial and a 1/3 scale model of Victoria's first main line diesel-electric locomotive B60, would be accessible to the general public as a result of the expansion.
- In June 2026, to increase undercover storage for its rolling stock collection, the museum commenced construction on an extension to its East Roof Canopy, alongside replacing the guttering along the northern side of the existing roof structure.

== Opening hours ==
The museum's regular opening hours are between 12 noon and 5 pm on Saturdays, and the third Sunday of each month between 12 noon and 5 pm. During school holiday periods, the museum opens on both Saturdays and all Sundays, between 12 noon and 5 pm.

== Collection ==
The museum contains the largest existing collection of Victorian Railways steam locomotives, a wide range of other Victorian Railways rolling stock, and numerous Victorian Railways artefacts. The collection includes:

- seventeen steam locomotives
- eight diesel locomotives
- three electric locomotives and four electric suburban carriages
- five country/interstate passenger carriages
- ten freight wagons and two guards vans
- five railway cranes
- rail tractors and postal trolleys
- a signal box
- an O scale model railway

On 17 November 2026, following a VicTrack expression of interest process, the Newport Railway Museum announced it had been allocated steam locomotive Z 526, known as Polly, which was the first locomotive built at the Newport Railway Workshops in 1893. Previously preserved at Scienceworks following its restoration to its original form in the 1980s, Z 526 is to be housed under the newly built extension of the museum's East Roof Canopy alongside its existing nineteenth century F, T, and E class steam locomotives. As part of the same allocation process, diesel electric locomotive B 83, which had been displayed at the museum for 36 years following its withdrawal from service in May 1988, was reallocated to the Yarra Valley Railway at Healesville for overhaul to operational condition for use on its reconstructed line to Yarra Glen.

=== Steam locomotives ===
Number	Image	Type	Year built	Builder	Livery	Notes
F 176		F class (Steam)	1880	Phoenix Foundry	Canadian Red	
T 94		T class (Steam)	1884	Phoenix Foundry	Two-tone green	Built as T 265. Renumbered as T 94 in 1924. Modified with flangeless wheels and coupled to W Class tender
Y 108		Y class (Steam)	1889	Phoenix Foundry	Two-tone green	Built as Y 395. Renumbered as Y 412 in 1924. Renumbered as Y 108 in 1951
E 369		EE class (Steam)	1892	David Munro	Black	Built as E 494. Rebuilt as an 0-6-2T and renumbered as E^{E} 494 in 1919. Renumbered as E^{E} 369 in 1923. Renumbered as E 369 in 1931
236		E class (Steam)	1893	David Munro	Two-tone green	Built as E 506. Unclassed and renumbered as 236 in 1923
D^{4} 268		D4 class (Steam)	1910	Newport Workshops	Canadian Red	Built as $\mathrm{D^D_E}$ 790. Renumbered $\mathrm{D^D_E}$ 268 in 1923. Renumbered as D^{4} 369
D^{2} 604		D2 class (Steam)	1912	Beyer, Peacock and Company	Canadian Red with blue lining	Built as D^{D} 557. Renumbered D^{D} 580 in 1925. Renumbered D^{D} 795 in 1926. Renumbered D^{2} 795 in 1929. Renumbered D^{2} 604 in 1951
D^{3} 635		D3 class (Steam)	1912	Baldwin Locomotive Works	Black with red lining	built as D^{D} 597. Renumbered D^{1} 597 in 1930. Renumbered D^{3} 635 in 1939
A^{2} 884		A2 class (Steam)	1913	Newport Workshops	Canadian Red	Built as A^{2} 848. Renumbered A^{2} 884 in 1929. Last remaining example of original 125 A^{2} locomotives built with Stephenson valve gear
A^{2} 995		A2 class (Steam)	1916	Newport Workshops	Canadian Red	Example of later 60 A^{2} locomotives built with Walschaerts valve gear
C 10		C class (Steam)	1922	Newport Workshops	Black	
X 36 / Gerald A Dee		X class (Steam)	1929	Newport Workshops	Black	
H 220 / Heavy Harry		H class (Steam)	1941	Newport Workshops	Black	
K 165		K class (Steam)	1941	Newport Workshops	Black	
N 432		N class (Steam)	1951	Newport Workshops	Jubilee Train - Green and gold	Last steam locomotive built by VR's Newport Workshops. Its green and gold livery was applied to N 430 for the 1951 Centenary-Jubilee train
R 704		R class (Steam)	1952	North British Locomotive Company	Black with red lining	Was displayed at the Festival of Britain in 1951 and retained its commemorative plaques
J 556		J class (Steam)	1954	Vulcan Foundry	Black with red lining	Wears the historically significant plates of scrapped J559, the last steam locomotive to enter service on the VR

=== Diesel locomotives ===
Number / Name	Image	Type	Year built	Builder	Livery	Notes
F 216 / SEC 2		F class (Diesel-electric)	1952	Dick, Kerr & Co.	SEC green	Renumbered back to SEC 2
F 211 / Little Trimmer		F class (Diesel-electric)	1953	Dick, Kerr & Co.	V/Line Orange & Grey	Was SEC 3
B 83		B class (Diesel-electric)	1953	Clyde Engineering	VR Blue and gold	To be transferred to the Yarra Valley Railway
S 308		S class (Diesel-electric)	1958	Clyde Engineering	V/Line Orange & Grey	
V 56		V class (Diesel-hydraulic)	1959	Newport Workshops	The Met (Trefoil logo)	
W 243		W class (Diesel-hydraulic)	1960	Tulloch Limited	VR Blue and gold	
W 255		W class (Diesel-hydraulic)	1960	Tulloch Limited	VR Blue and gold	
T 367		T class (Diesel-electric)	1964	Clyde Engineering	V/Line Orange & Grey	
Y 137		Y class (Diesel-electric)	1965	Clyde Engineering	V/Line Orange & Grey	

=== Electric rollingstock ===
Number / Name	Image	Type	Year built	Builder	Livery	Notes
8M		Swing Door motor	1888	Newport Workshops	Heritage red	
E 1102		E class (electric)	1928	Newport Workshops	Black	
L 1150 / R G Wishart		L class (electric)	1953	English Electric	VR Blue and gold	Ran the
795M		Harris motor	1968	Newport Workshops	VR Blue and gold	
187M		Hitachi motor	1980	Martin & King	Steel	
903M (ex. 744M)		Refurbished Harris motor	1983	Comeng	The Met (Trefoil logo)	

=== Passenger carriages ===
Number / Name	Image	Type	Year built	Builder	Livery	Notes
136 AB		AB 1st / 2nd Class	c.1886		Red	Body only, resting on a steel frame which was fitted in 2023
11 AA		AA 1st Class	1880	Wright & Edwards	Red	Formerly a display car, not accessible to the public
Norman		Inspection Car	1890	Newport Workshops	Red	Display car
Torrens		Sleeping Car	1907	Newport Workshops	Overland - Dark green	
Wimmera		Medical & Vision Test Car	1908	Newport Workshops	VR Blue and gold	
VRS 231 / Mitta Mitta		VRS Refreshment Car	1939	Newport Workshops	V/Line Mk II	Birthday car

=== Vans ===
Number	Image	Type	Year built	Builder	Livery	Notes
ZL 220		ZL Guards Van (Long Shank)	1875		Red	Built as D 45. Renumbered as Z 45 in c.1910. Renumbered as Z 220 in 1954. Renumbered as ZL 220 in 1960
ZLP 25		ZLP Freight / Pass Van	1962	Newport Workshops	Red	Built as ZF 25. Renumbered as ZLP 25 in 1965
VVEY 1		VVEY Modular Cabin Van	1980	Newport Workshops	White	Built as ZMF 1. Renumbered VVEY 1 in 1983. Body on ground
VVEY 10		VVEY Modular Cabin Van	1982	Newport Workshops	White	Built as ZMF 10. Renumbered VVEY 10. Body on ground

=== Freight wagons ===
Number	Image	Type	Year built	Builder	Livery	Notes
IB 5452		IB Open Wagon	1890	Lennon, H., Spottiswoode	Red	Built as I 5452. Renumbered as IB 5452 in c.1929. Renumbered as HD 5452 in c.1960. Renumbered as IB 5452 in c.1968
H 925		H Fixed Wheel Produce Van	1893	Newport Workshops	Red	
H 958		H Fixed Wheel Produce Van	1897	Newport Workshops	Red	
KR 169		KR Rail Transporter	1905		Red	Built as I 7460. Renumbered as IA 7460 in c.1935. Renumbered as KR 169 in 1959
UB 56		UB Louvre Van	1916	Newport Workshops	Red	Built as U 855. Renumbered as UB 56 in 1934. Renumbered as VLAA 56 in 1981
KR 307		KR Rail Transporter	1917	Newport Workshops	Red	Built as I 14911. Renumbered as KR 307 in 1968
No. 15 Oil Tank		OT Oil Tank	1924	Newport Workshops	BP - Black with yellow stripe	
RY 600		RY Open Wagon	1931	Newport Workshops	Red	Built as IZ 600. Renumbered as RY 600 in 1965
VLBY 114		VLBY Louvre Van	1954	Newport Workshops	VR Red	Built as VP 114. Renumbered as VLPY 114 in 1980. Renumbered as VLBY 114 in 1983
VLX 334		1964 - VLX Louvre Van	1966	Newport Workshops	Red	Built as VLX 334. Renumbered VLCX 334 in 1979
HZL 211		HZL Loco Bogie Transport			Red	

=== Other items ===
Number	Image	Type	Year built	Builder	Livery	Notes
RT 1		Rail Tractor	1932	Newport Workshops	Red	
		Ex Geelong Loco Hand Crane				
No 2 Steam Crane		Steam crane	1890	Dubs & Company	Black	
No 19 Steam Crane		Steam crane	1942	Newport Workshops	Black	
No 19 Crane Tender		Crane tender			Red	
No 36 Steam Crane		Steam crane			Black	
No 73 Hand Crane		Hand crane			Green, yellow and black	
SEC 37		SEC electric loco				
Coal Hopper 637		SEC coal hopper			White and yellow	
Mary the Match Truck		Wagon			Red	Was used with Crane No 36 at Spotswood
		Postal motor trolley			Yellow	
		Way & works trollies			Yellow	2 trollies
		Cordite trucks			Yellow	2 trucks

== Gallery ==
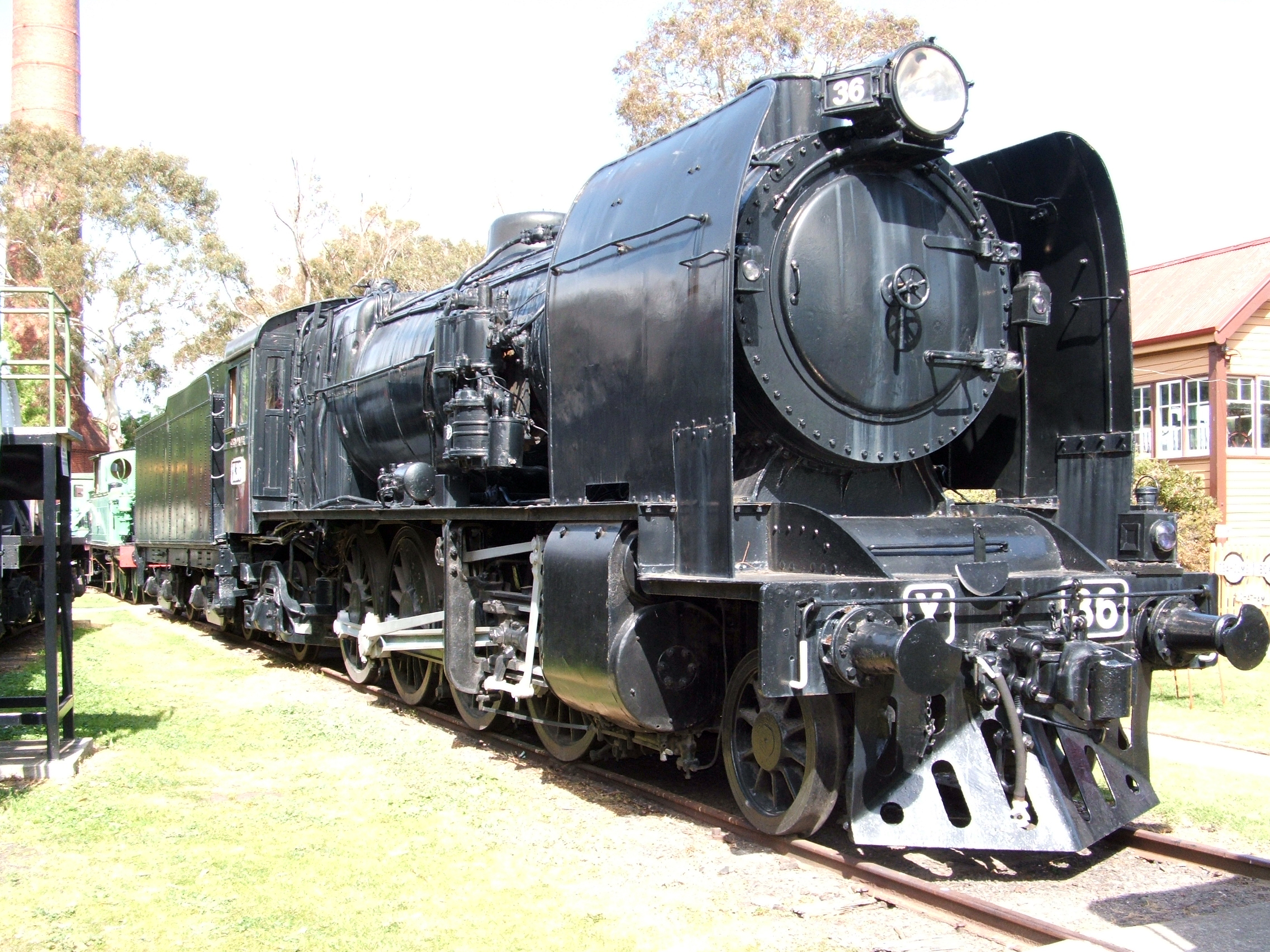
X36

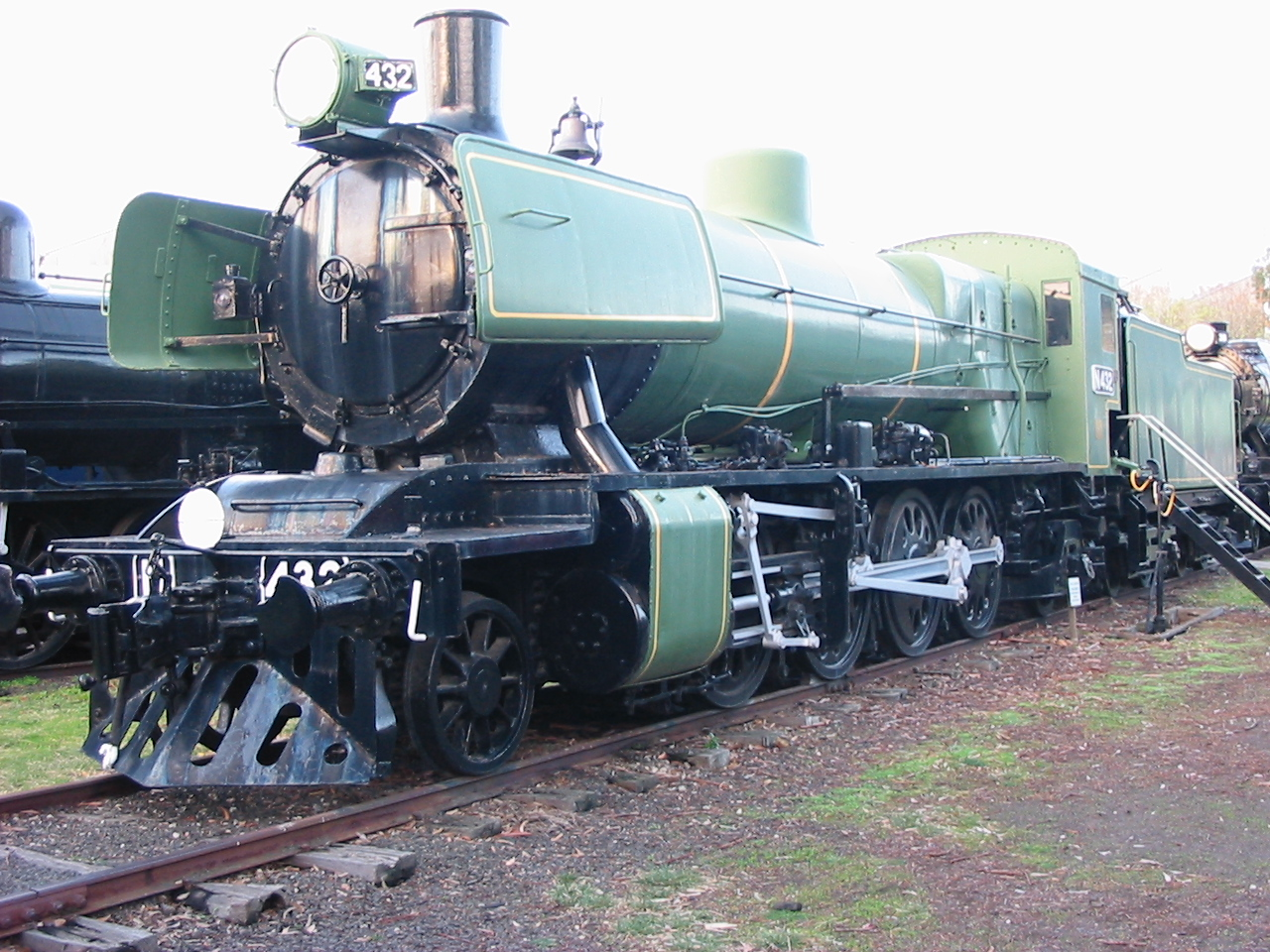
N432

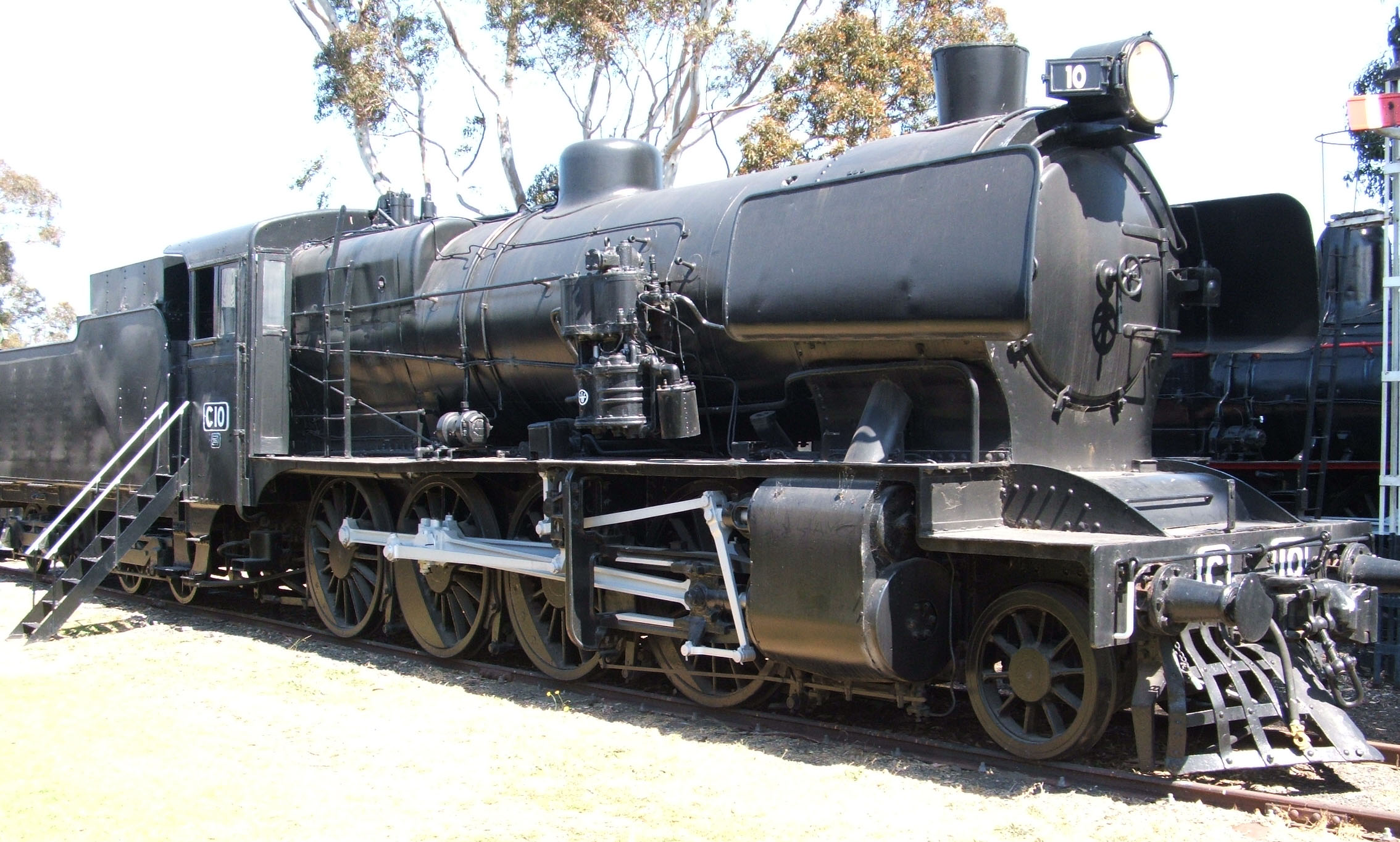
C10

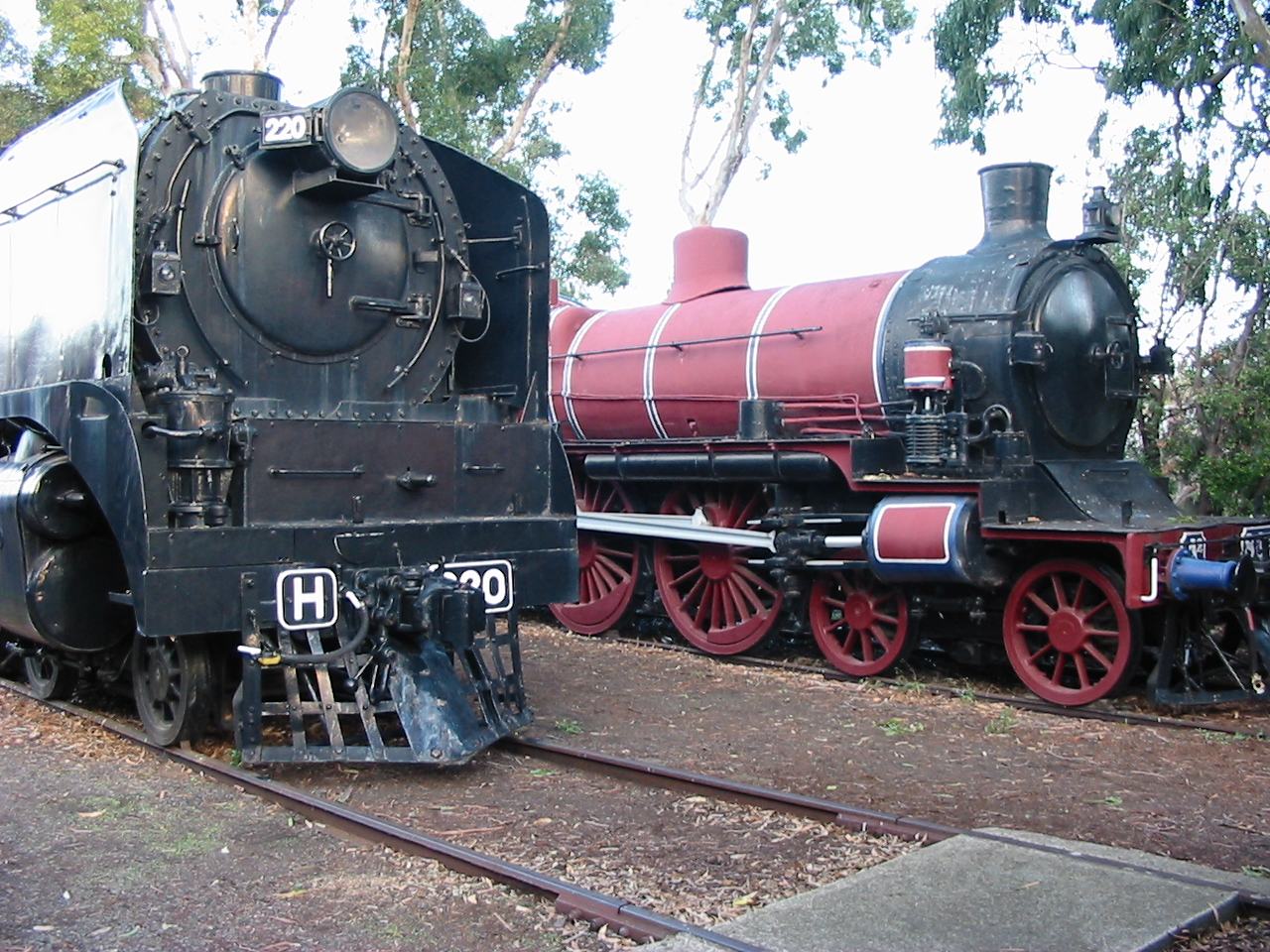
H220 with A^{2}884

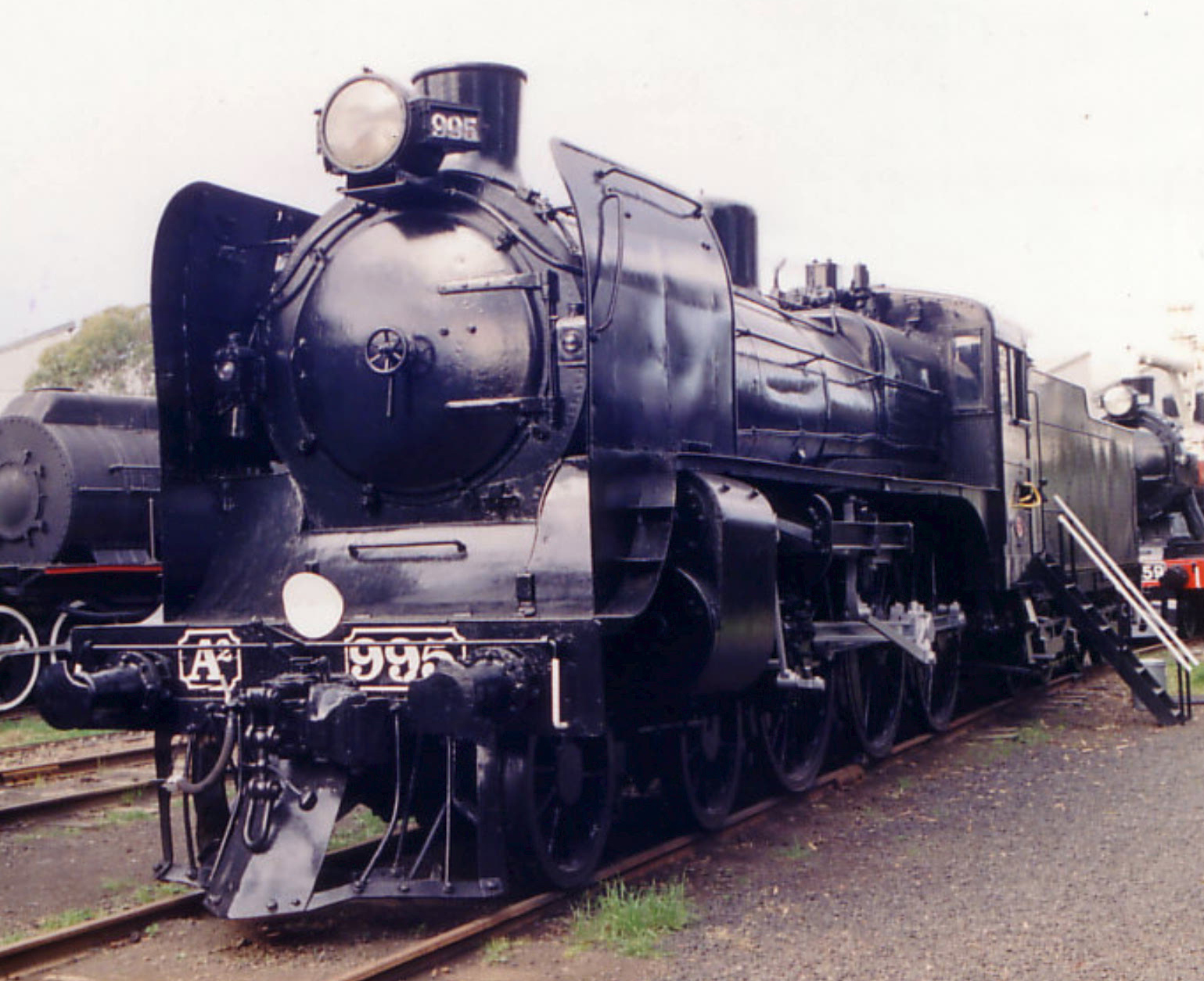
A^{2}995

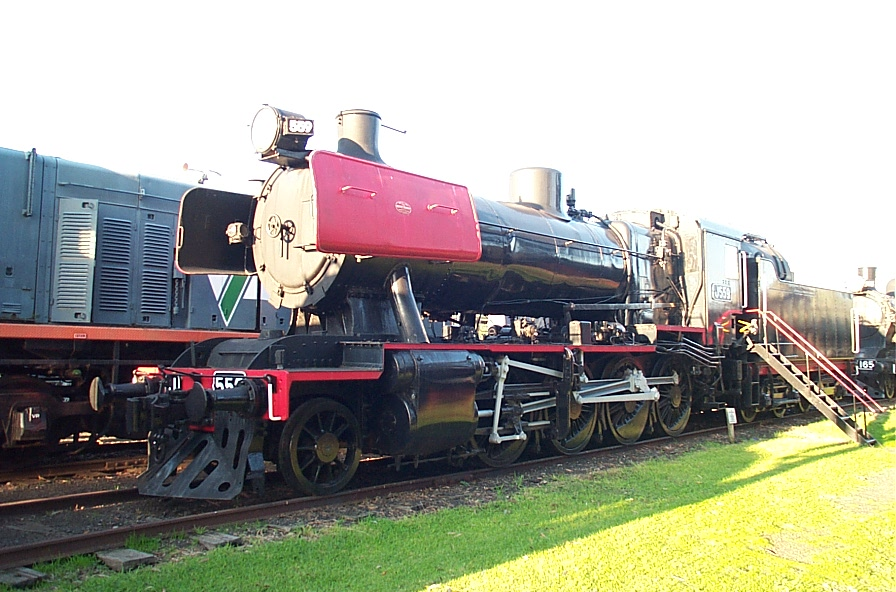
J556

Railway artefacts

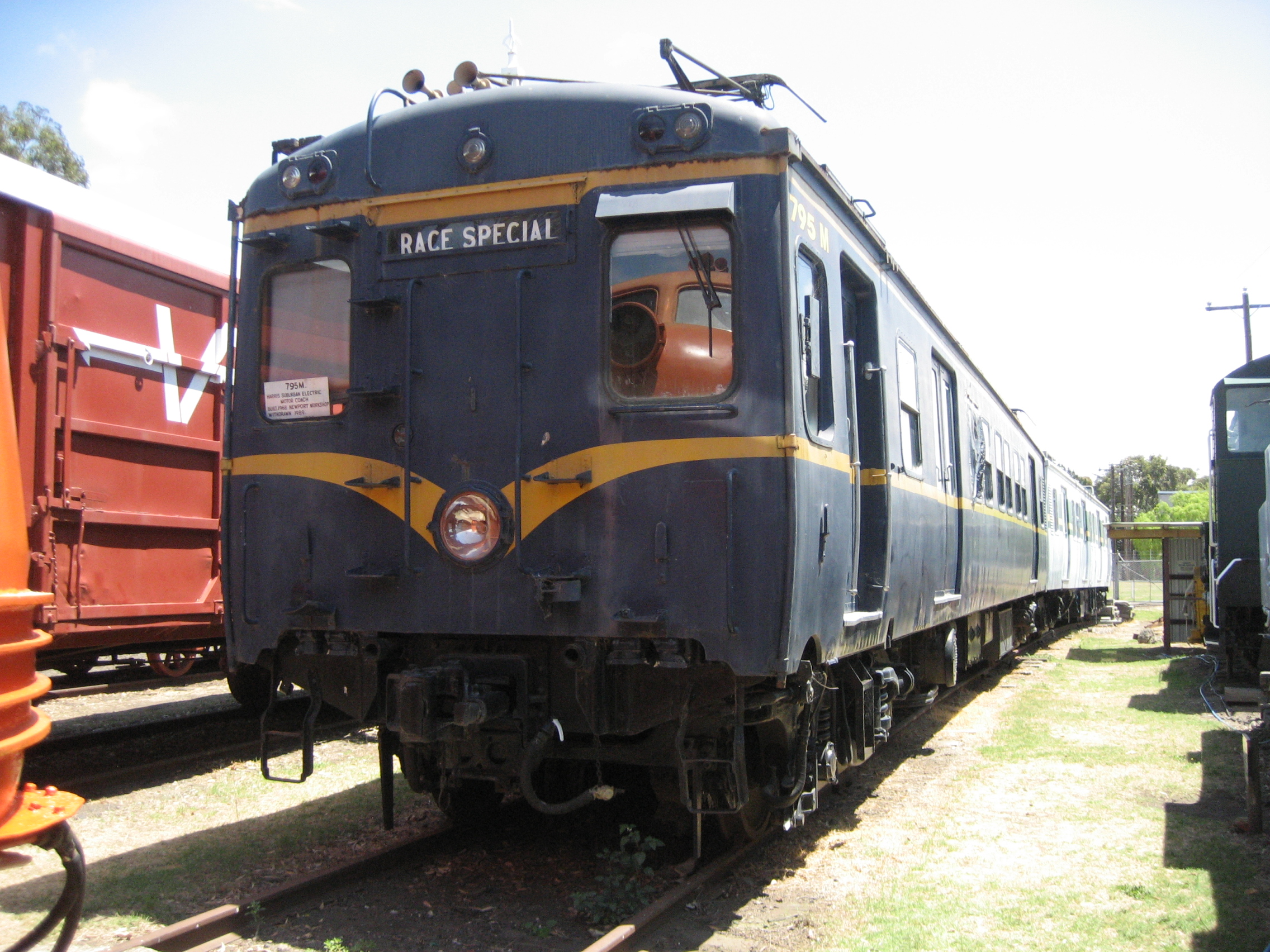
Harris-type suburban car

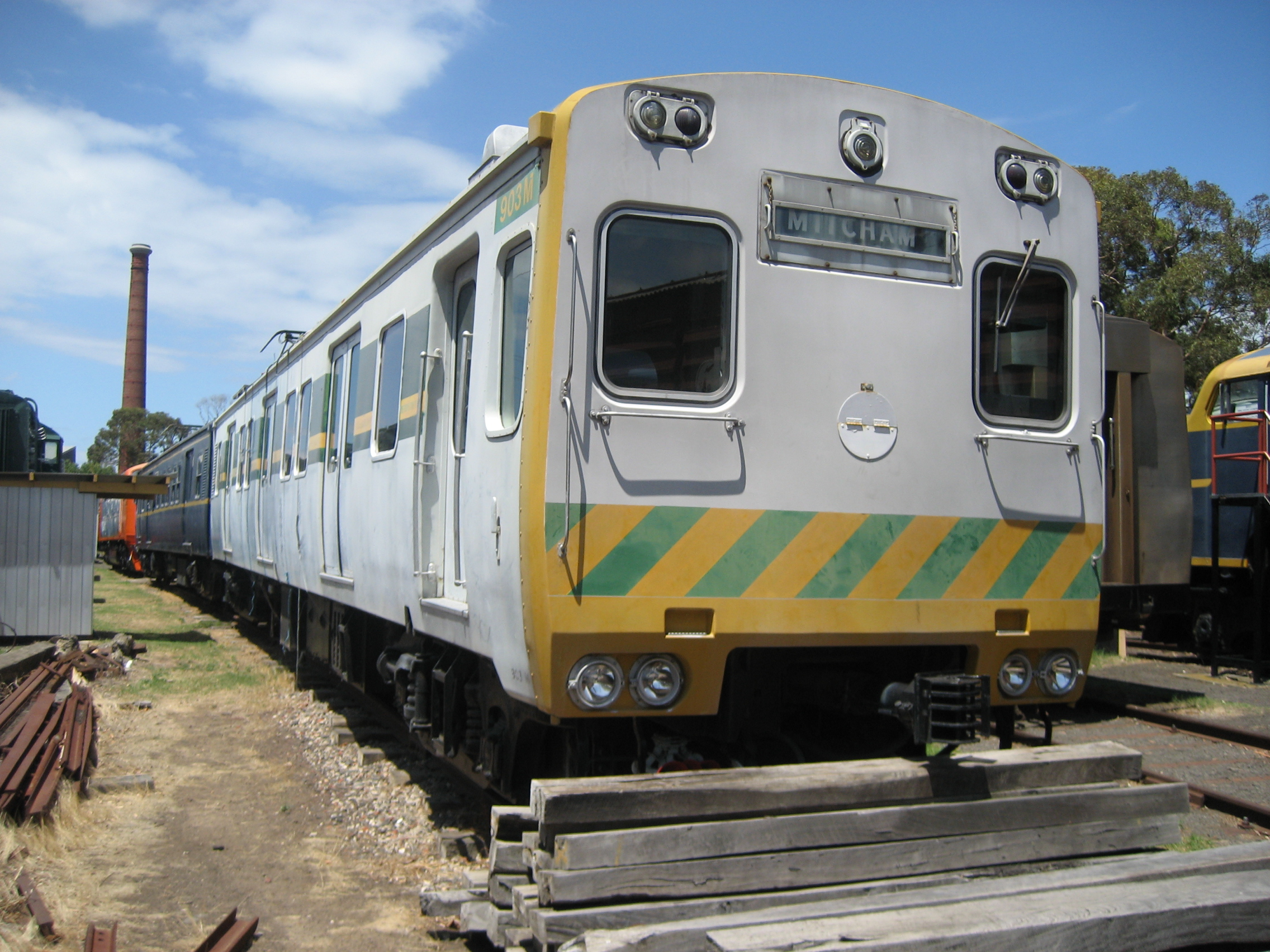
Modified Harris suburban car ("Grey Ghost")

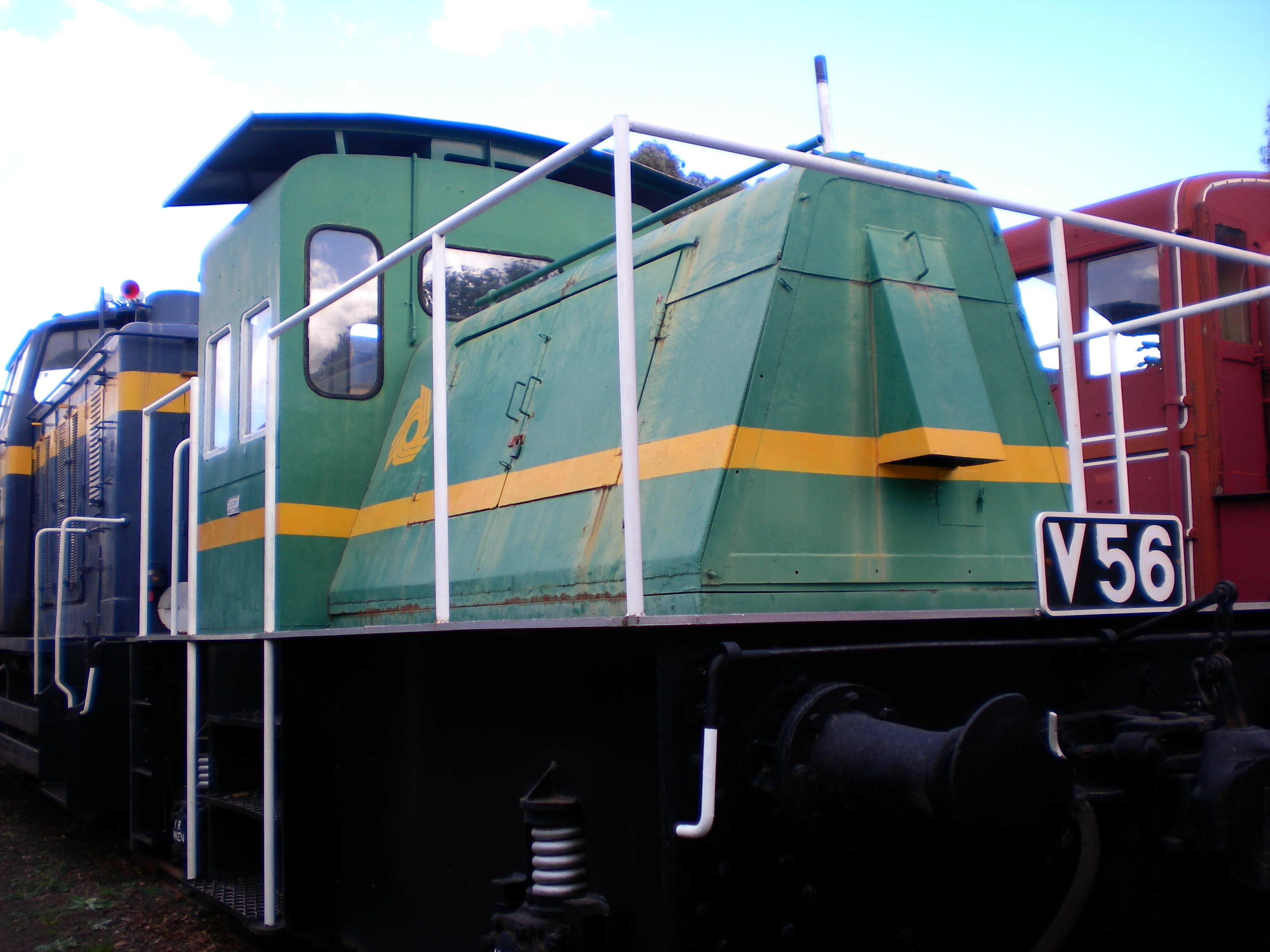
V56

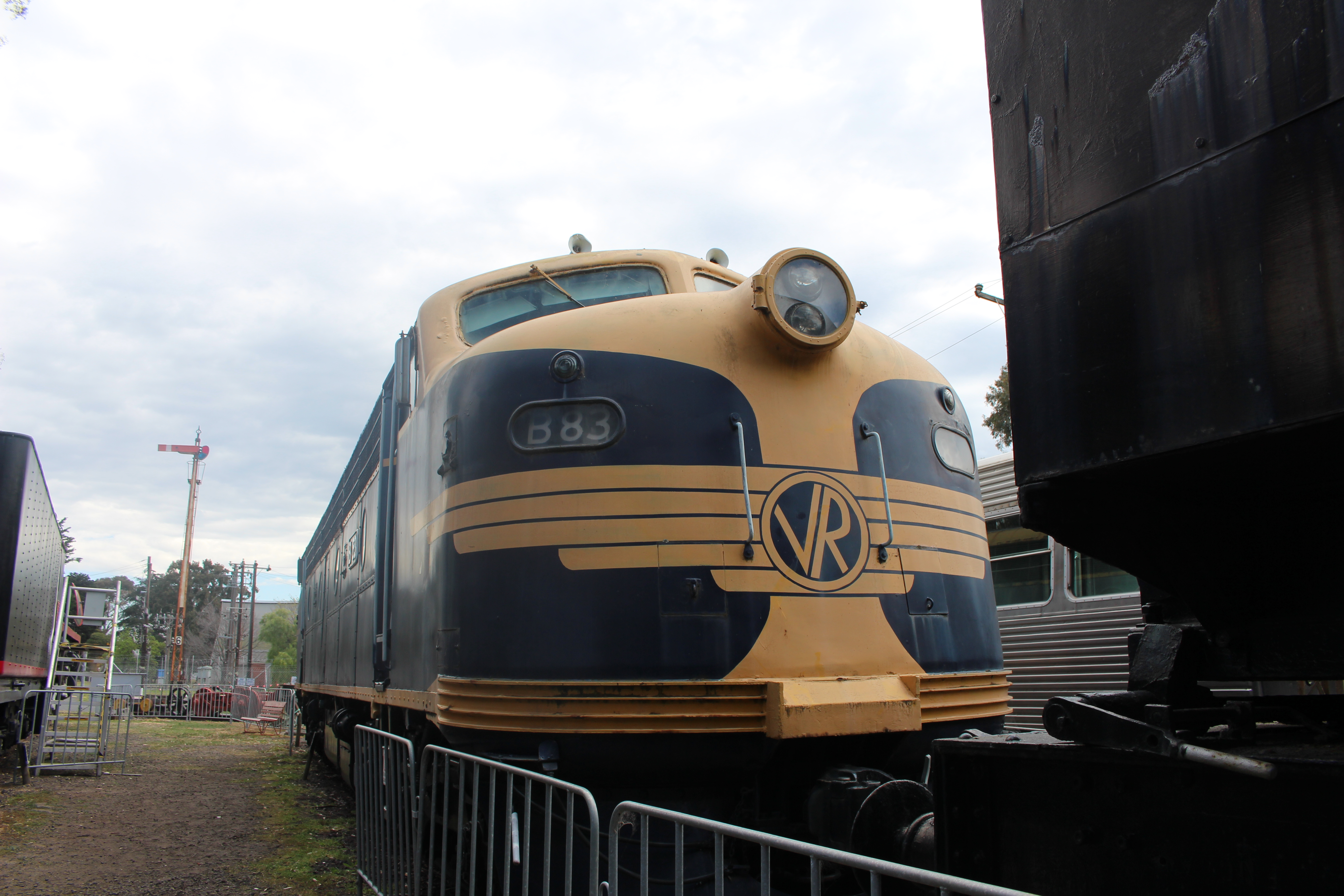
B83

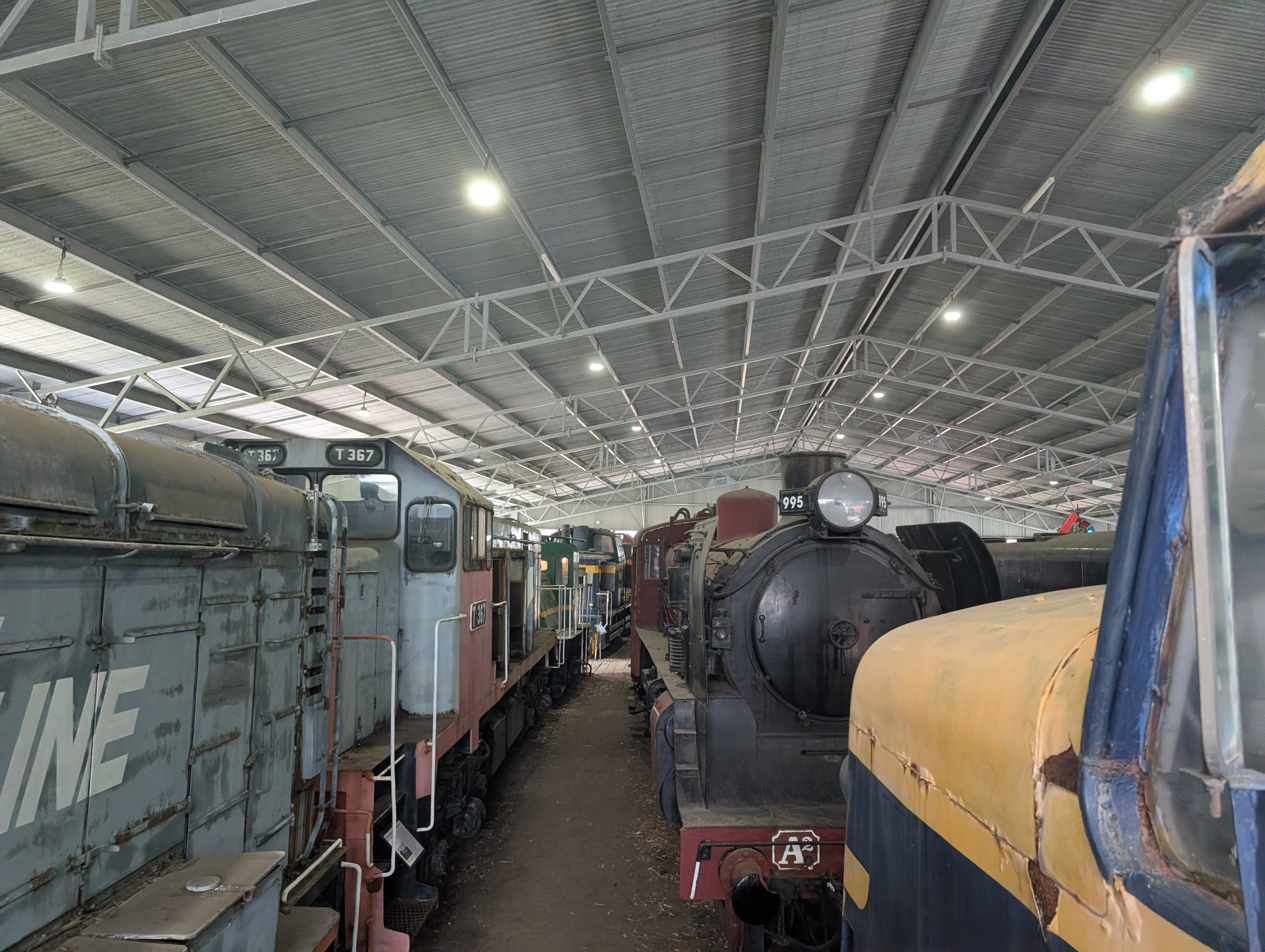
Overview of several locomotives at the Newport Railway Museum
