= South Australian Railways 750 class =

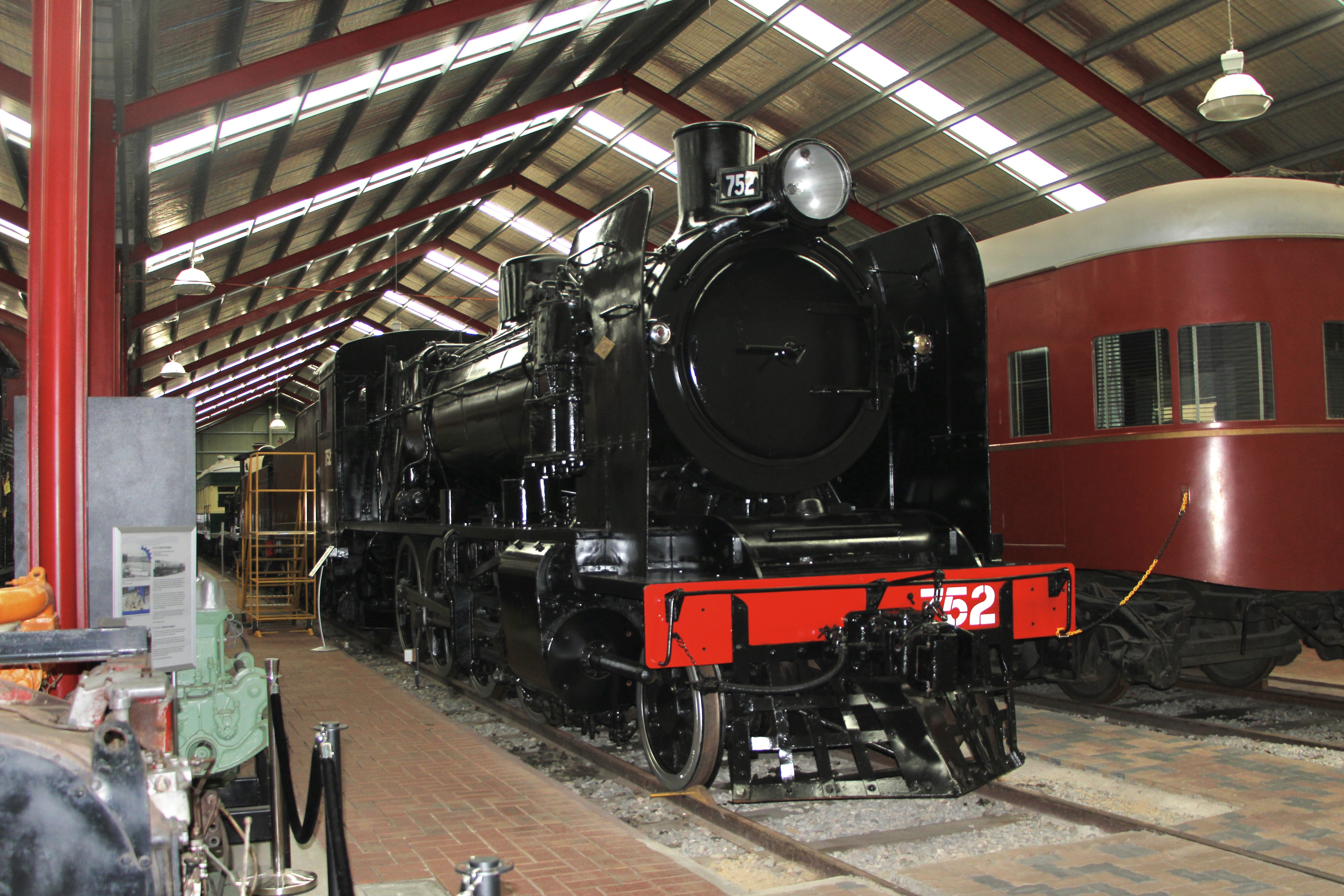
- Restored class member 752 at the National Railway Museum, Port Adelaide, April 2025
Type and origin
- Power type: Steam
- Builder: North British Locomotive Company
- Build date: 1950/51
- Total produced: 10
Specifications
- Configuration
  - Whyte: 2-8-2
- Gauge: 1,600 mm (5 ft 3 in)
- Leading dia.: 3 ft 1.4 in (950 mm)
- Driver dia.: 4 ft 7.75 in (1,416 mm)
- Trailing dia.: 3 ft 1.4 in (950 mm)
- Length: 67 ft 5 in (20.55 m)
- Height: 13 ft 11 3/8 in (4,251.3 mm)
- Axle load: 13 long tons 17 cwt (31,000 lb or 14.1 t)
- Adhesive weight: 54.65 long tons 0 cwt (122,400 lb or 55.5 t)
- Loco weight: 76.00 long tons 0 cwt (170,200 lb or 77.2 t)
- Tender weight: 48.655 long tons 0 cwt (109,000 lb or 49.4 t)
- Total weight: 124 long tons 65 cwt (285,000 lb or 129.3 t)
- Fuel type: Coal
- Fuel capacity: 6 long tons 0 cwt (13,400 lb or 6.1 t)
- Water cap.: 4,600 imp gal (5,500 US gal; 21,000 L)
- Firebox
  - Grate area: 31 sq ft (2.9 m^{2})
- Boiler pressure: 175 psi (1,207 kPa)
- Heating surface
  - Firebox: 203 sq ft (18.9 m^{2})
  - Tubes: 1,250 sq ft (116 m^{2})
- Superheater
  - Heating area: 324 sq ft (30.1 m^{2})
- Cylinders: 2
- Cylinder size: 20 in × 26 in (508 mm × 660 mm)
- Valve gear: Walschaerts
- Valve type: Piston
Performance figures
- Tractive effort: 28,650 lbf (127.44 kN)
- Factor of adh.: 4.27
Career
- Operators: South Australian Railways
- Class: 750
- Number in class: 10
- Numbers: 750-759
- First run: 11/12/1950 On V.R. 5/1/1951 On S.A.R.
- Withdrawn: 1961-1969
- Preserved: 752
- Scrapped: 1962-1967
- Disposition: 1 preserved, 9 scrapped

The South Australian Railways 750 class is a class of 2-8-2 steam locomotives operated by the South Australian Railways.

== History ==
With an acute shortage of motive power following World War II, the South Australian Railways were able to purchase 10 Victorian Railways N class locomotives in 1951 which had been in service for only a few months. They replaced Rx class locomotives on branch line services particularly over the light lines in the Murray Mallee radiating from Tailem Bend. Withdrawals began in July 1961 with the last withdrawn in September 1967.

752 is the sole survivor of the class, being placed in the Mile End Railway Museum in April 1967. It was later moved to the Port Dock Railway Museum (now the National Railway Museum, Port Adelaide) in 1988. In 2025, 752 was cosmetically restored and placed on public display in the main display pavilion.
