= Victorian Railways C class =

Class of Australian 2-8-0 steam locomotives

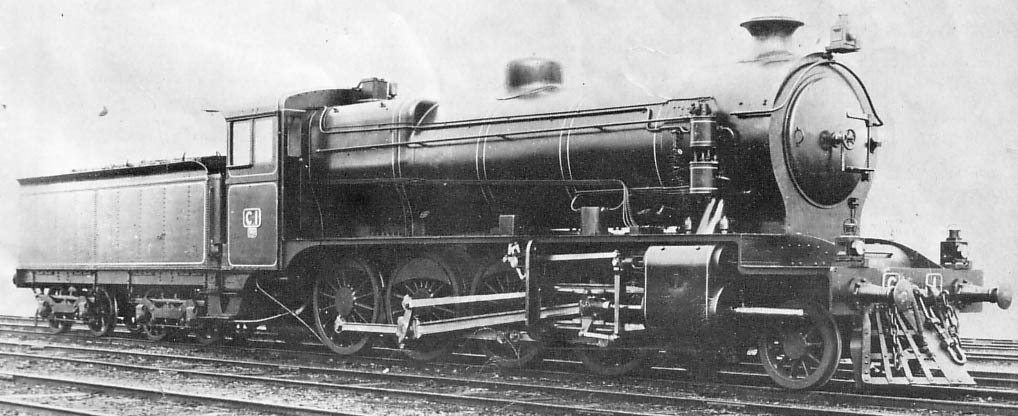
- VR photograph of C 1, as built in 1918.
Type and origin
- Power type: steam
- Designer: W. M. Shannon
- Builder: Newport Workshops
- Build date: 1918–1926
- Total produced: 26
Specifications
- Configuration
  - Whyte: 2-8-0
  - UIC: 1'Dh2
- Gauge: 5 ft 3 in (1,600 mm)
- Leading dia.: 3 ft 1 7/16 in (0.951 m)
- Driver dia.: 5 ft 1 11/16 in (1.567 m)
- Length: 65 ft 3 in (19.89 m)
- Height: 13 ft 9 in (4.191 m)
- Axle load: 18 long tons 10 cwt (41,400 lb or 18.8 t)
- Adhesive weight: 71 long tons 18 cwt (161,100 lb or 73.1 t) roadworthy
- Tender weight: 47 long tons 0 cwt (105,300 lb or 47.8 t)
- Total weight: 128 long tons 10 cwt (287,800 lb or 130.6 t)
- Tender cap.: (after conversion to oil firing) 1,500 imp gal (6,800 L; 1,800 US gal) oil, 4,700 imp gal (21,000 L; 5,600 US gal) water
- Firebox
  - Grate area: 32 sq ft (3.0 m^{2})
- Boiler pressure: 200 psi (1,379 kPa)
- Heating surface
  - Firebox: 175 sq ft (16.3 m^{2})
  - Tubes and flues: 1,915 sq ft (177.9 m^{2})
  - Total surface: 2,417 sq ft (224.5 m^{2})
- Superheater
  - Heating area: 327 sq ft (30.4 m^{2})
- Cylinders: Two, outside
- Cylinder size: 22 in × 28 in (559 mm × 711 mm)
- Valve gear: Walschaerts
Performance figures
- Tractive effort: 38,400 lbf (170.81 kN) at 85% boiler pressure
- Factor of adh.: 4.26
Career
- Numbers: C1 to C26
- First run: 1918
- Last run: 1962
- Disposition: One preserved, remainder scrapped

The C class is a mainline goods locomotive of the 2-8-0 'Consolidation' type that ran on the Victorian Railways between 1918 and 1962. Although its original design had some key shortcomings, a number of improvements were made over the class' long career on the VR, many of which were subsequently applied to other locomotive classes on the system.

== History ==
Designed by Chief Mechanical Engineer W. M. Shannon, the C class was the first goods locomotive designed and built entirely in-house by the Victorian Railways Newport Workshops, following on from the successful Dd and A2 class passenger locomotives. When class leader C 1 was introduced in 1918, it was the heaviest and most powerful steam locomotive in Australia. It had been necessary for Victorian Railways to strengthen bridges at Dudley Street, North Melbourne and along the lines to Woodend and Seymour on which the new locomotive was expected to run.

=== Production ===
The prototype locomotive C 1 was the only one of the class painted in the Victorian Railways 'Canadian Red' scheme. Locomotive C 2 was the first new Victorian Railways locomotive to be finished in the new VR livery of plain, unrelieved black, a cost-efficiency initiative introduced by the new VR Chairman Harold Clapp. It was the first of a further 25 C class members also built at Newport Workshops between 1921 and 1926.

=== Regular service ===
The high tractive effort of the C class locomotives enabled Victorian Railways to operate heavier goods trains with a single locomotive and thus enabled significant savings in operating costs through a reduction in train-miles for the tonnage hauled. Along with the smaller K class branch line 2-8-0, they were credited with playing a major part in the 15% reduction in overall goods and livestock train miles on Victoria Railways between 1920 and 1924, against a reduction of overall tonnage hauled of only 3% for the same years.

Upon introduction, locomotive C 1 was put to work operating through goods trains on the Melbourne to Seymour line. Apart from its ability to operate a heavy train unassisted, it was also found to be 5% more efficient in coal consumption per ton-mile than superheater-equipped A2 and Dd class locomotives, and 25% more efficient that A2 or Dd class locomotives with saturated steam boilers.

By 1924 C class locomotives were operating on the Bendigo, North Eastern, and Wonthaggi railway lines, where full trainloads of bulk goods were available. By 1925, they were also operating grain trains from Ararat to Geelong via Maroona where they were able to haul 1200 ton trains unassisted, a 420-ton increase over the hauling capacity of an A2 class locomotive on the same route.

=== Design improvements ===
In practice, the C class was initially a somewhat less successful design than the A2. Key shortcomings included a very long, 9 feet 7 inches (2.92 m) manually stoked firebox that was difficult to fire and prone to clinkering, and an undersized boiler. The locomotives tended to run out of steam when worked hard.

In an attempt to rectify these problems, locomotive C 5 was fitted in 1933 with a new front end, based on the Association of American Railroads (AAR) design of self-cleaning smokebox, to improve steaming qualities. The results were very promising and led to further experimental work, using A2 class locomotive A2 998 as a test bed and conducted under the direction of VR Rolling Stock branch engineer Edgar Brownbill, in streamlining the steam passages and other changes to reduce back pressure on the exhaust side and increase efficiency. These changes, referred to as 'Modified Front End', were such an improvement that the rest of the A2 and C classes were progressively modified, as well as all of the K, N, S and X classes.

In 1929, C 5 also became the first VR locomotive to be fitted with a cross-compound air compressor, which was also subsequently adopted across other VR locomotive classes. The C class was also the first goods locomotive to be fitted with Automatic Staff Exchange apparatus, given their frequent used on express goods and fruit services.

As the poor quality of coal available after World War II exacerbated the problems of firing the C class and industrial action in the mines threatened supply, the entire class was converted to oil firing from 1946 onwards following an initial conversion of C 15 in 1946. Despite the success of the conversion, C class locomotives were still prone to running out of steam when pushed on long rising gradients.

Whereas other VR locomotives to receive Modified Front End treatment had been equipped with smoke deflectors in the 1930s, it was not until 1947 that the VR finally developed a successful design of smoke deflector for the C class, based on the German "Witte" pattern. This design was then adopted for the final Newport-built N class locomotives as well as the last two steam locomotive classes on the VR, the R and J classes.

=== Experimental use of pulverised brown coal ===
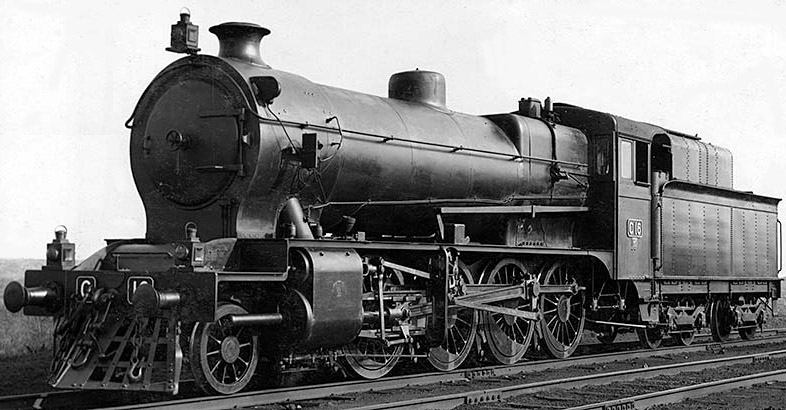
C 16 circa 1923, as converted to run on pulverised brown coal

In 1923, C 16 was modified with Fuller-Lehigh equipment to run on pulverised brown coal (PBC), a potentially abundant fuel in Victoria given the large brown coal reserves in the Latrobe Valley. Unlike the later conversion of X class locomotive X 32 to PBC firing in 1949, this early experiment was not considered a success and C 16 was returned to black coal operation.

=== Passenger use ===
During World War II, increasingly heavy passenger trains and a shortage of suitable motive power saw the C class used as mainline passenger locomotives, a somewhat unusual assignment for a 2-8-0. To facilitate passenger working, their maximum allowable speed was raised from 50 mph (80 km/h) to 60 mph (96 km/h) on the key North Eastern, Ballarat, Bendigo and Geelong lines.

=== Withdrawal ===
The postwar rebuilding of Victorian Railways in the late 1940s and early 1950s saw the order of hundreds of new locomotives of superior design to the C class, culminating in the delivery of B class mainline diesel electric and L class mainline electric locomotives.

With these new locomotives entering service, the ageing C class locomotives were progressively withdrawn from service, commencing with C 20 in June 1954. The last C class in service, C 7, was withdrawn in April 1962.

== Engine histories ==
Based on locomotive history cards.

No.	Built	Electric light	Auto couplers	Modified front end	Staff exchanger	Oil burner	Smoke deflectors	Broken up	Age	Notes
1	18	32	32	36	40	48	40	61	43	Last painted crimson
2	21	35	32	35	35	46	?	57	35	First painted black
3	21	35	33	35	35	47	49	60	38	
4	21	34	32	35	38	47	?	60	38	
5	21	31	32	?	40	46	?	58	36	
6	21	31	32	36	39	47	?	56	34	
7	22	31	32	34	31	46	?	62	40	
8	22	35	32	36	44	47	?	57	35	
9	22	35	32	?	39	46	49	61	39	
10	22	31	32	35	37	46	?	62	40	To ARHS
11	22	35	32	?	38	46	?	56	34	
12	22	31	32	?	34	46	?	57	34	
13	22	35	32	?	34	47	?	62	39	
14	22	31	31	36	40	49	?	60	37	
15	22	31	32	?	34	46	?	61	38	
16	23	31	87	35	40	49	52	61	37	
17	24	31	32	34	31	46	?	55	31	
18	23	31	31	?	37	46	?	55	32	
19	24	35	32	?	38	46	?	56	32	
20	24	31	32	?	34	46	?	54	30	
21	24	31	32	35	38	46	?	55	30	
22	26	31	27	?	34	47	48	61	34	
23	26	35	From new	?	37	46	49	60	33	
24	26	35	From new	?	34	46	?	57	30	
25	26	35	From new	?	37	46	?	54	27	
26	26	34	From new	36	43	47	?	59	32	

== Preservation ==
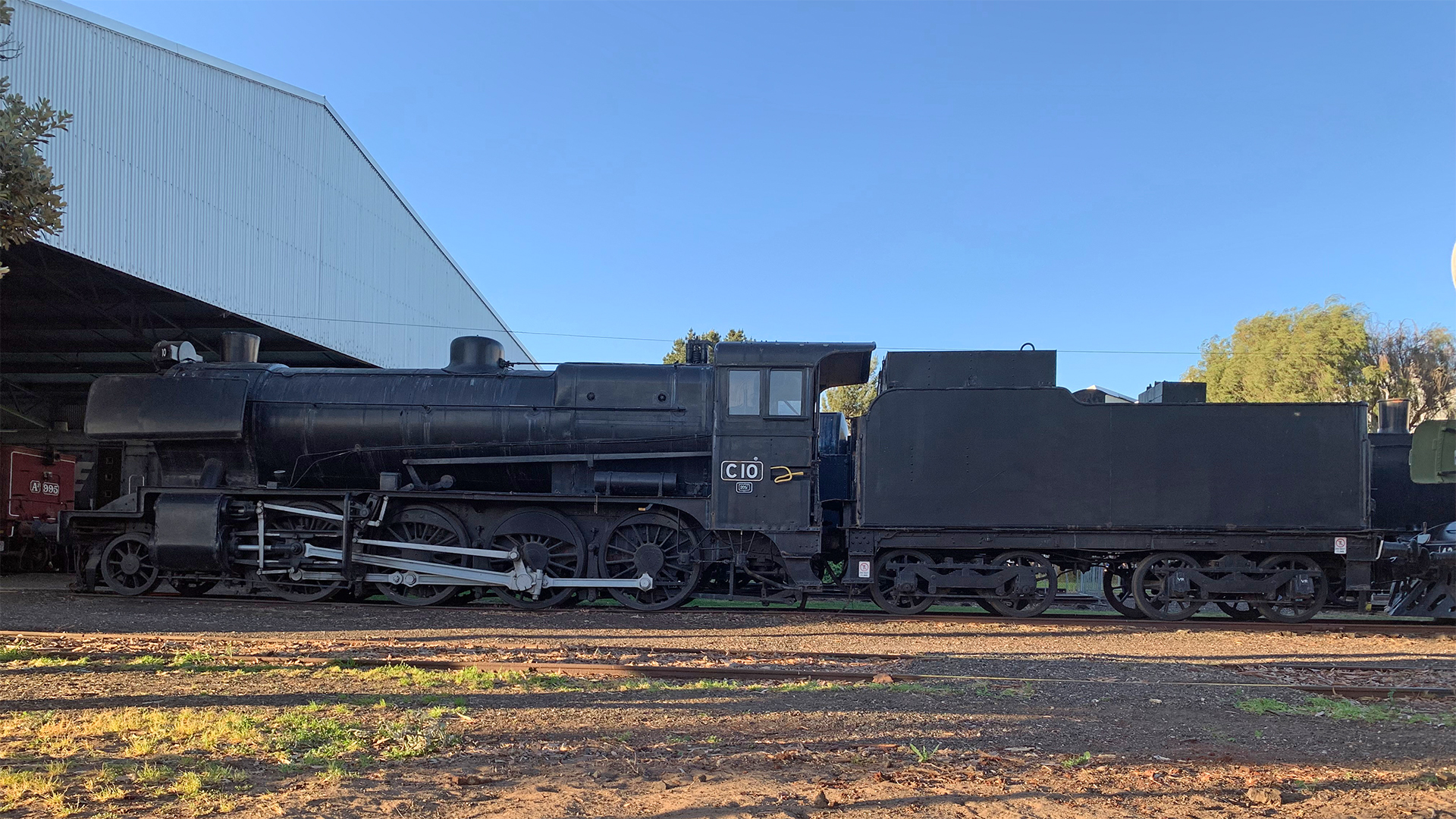
Victorian Railways C class 2-8-0 locomotive No. C 10, as preserved at the Newport Railway Museum, and shows the final configuration of the class with electric headlamp, smoke deflectors, automatic staff exchanger and oil firing.

C 10 was set aside for preservation on 18 May 1962, after having run 1,160,856 miles (1,868,217 km) during its career on the VR. It is preserved at the Newport Railway Museum.
