= Victorian Railways L class =

Class of electric locomotives used in Australia

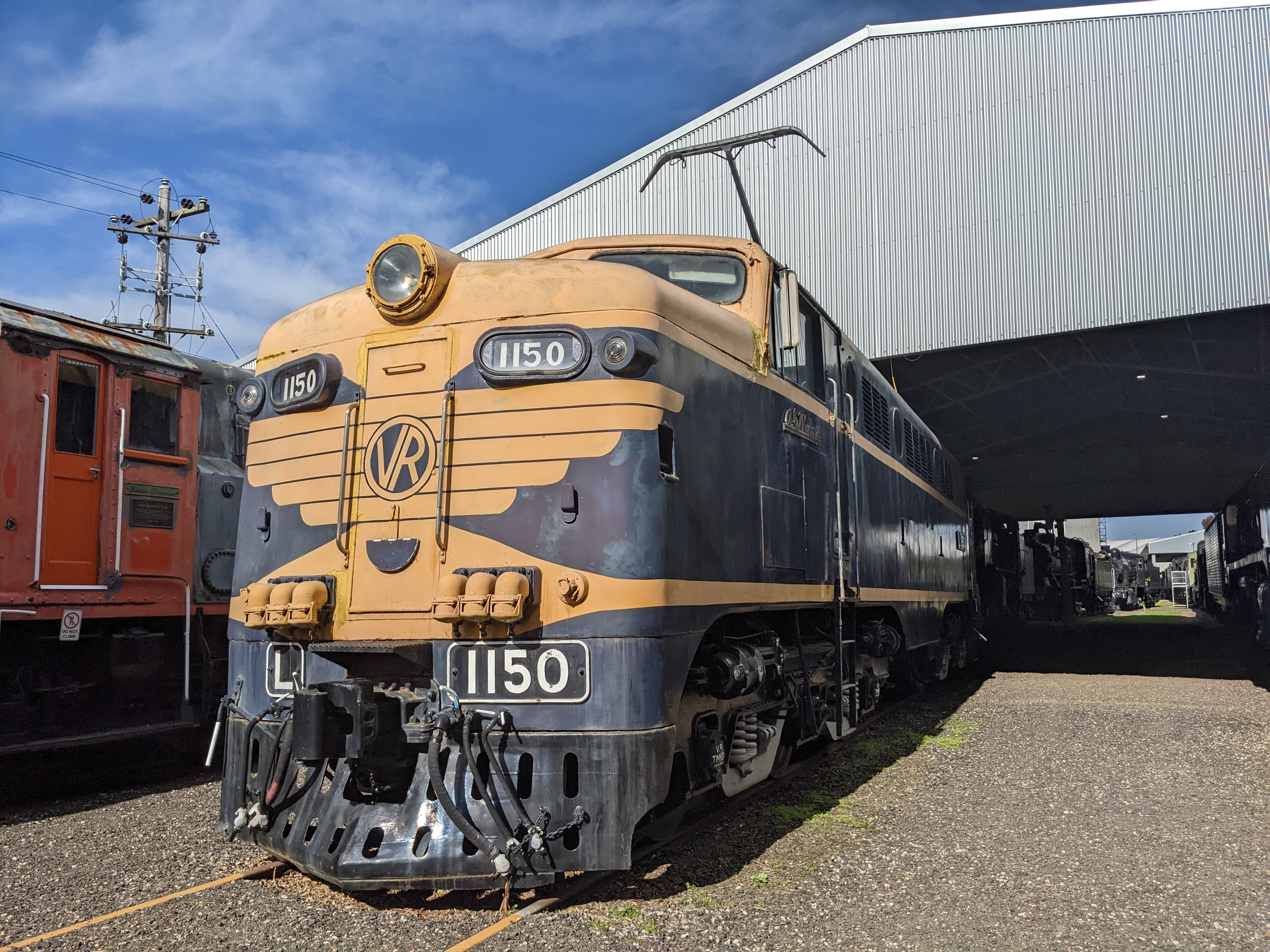
- L1150 (L class locomotive) at Newport Railway Museum, September 2022
Type and origin
- Power type: Electric
- Builder: English Electric (Dick, Kerr & Co, Stafford)
- Serial number: 1884 to 1900; 1919 to 1926
- Build date: 1953–1954
- Total produced: 25
Specifications
- Configuration
  - UIC: Co-Co
- Gauge: 5 ft 3 in (1,600 mm)
- Wheel diameter: 3 ft 4 in (1,016 mm)
- Length: 59 ft (17.98 m)
- Loco weight: 97 long tons 1 cwt (217,400 lb or 98.6 t)
- Electric system/s: 1.5 kV Direct Current Catenary
- Current pickup: Pantograph
- Traction motors: 6 × English Electric Model 519
Performance figures
- Maximum speed: 75 mph (121 km/h)
- Power output: 2,400 hp (1,790 kW)
- Tractive effort: 47,000 lbf (209.1 kN) starting 25,200 lbf (112.1 kN) continuous
Career
- Operators: Victorian Railways
- Number in class: 25
- Numbers: L1150–L1174
- First run: February 1953
- Last run: 13 June 1987
- Preserved: L1150, L1160, L1162, L1169
- Disposition: 4 preserved, 21 scrapped

The Victorian Railways L class is a class of electric locomotives built by English Electric and operated by the Victorian Railways and later V/Line from 1953 until 1987 primarily for the Gippsland line. They were the only class of main line electric locomotive operated in Victoria.

== History ==
Australia was a relatively early adopter of electric traction and Electric Multiple Unit trains, with a General Electric advertisement in Railway Age magazine of 1924 claiming that Melbourne had the largest suburban electrification scheme in the world at 346 miles (557 km). However, electrification in Victoria had until the 1950s been restricted to the Melbourne suburban network. Apart from the EMU fleet the only electric locomotives operated by the Victorian Railways (VR) were a fleet of 12 small 620 hp (460 kW) types (two steeple cabs 1100 and 1101 plus ten box cabs 1102 to 1111). In the 1960s the latter became classified E class. They were all built in the 1920s at VR's Newport Workshops for suburban goods service, using the same General Electric traction motors and electrical equipment employed on Melbourne's EMU fleet.

During the early 1950s, VR embarked on an £80 million program dubbed Operation Phoenix to rebuild a network badly run down by years of Depression-era underinvestment and wartime overutilisation. This included a substantial upgrade (regrading, rerouting and electrification) of the Gippsland line to Traralgon servicing Victoria's substantial brown coal fields in the Latrobe Valley to allow for greatly increased traffic in briquettes for industrial use. A suitably powerful electric locomotive was sought for both express passenger and heavy freight use on the upgraded, electrified line.

=== Production ===
In-house locomotive production by VR had virtually ceased with the last of the N class locomotives in 1951, and an order was placed with English Electric in England for 25 locomotives. All were built at the Dick, Kerr & Co workshops in Stafford. The first two arrived in Australia in January 1953, entering service the following month on suburban Melbourne freight services pending the completion of the Gippsland line electrification. The Renfe Class 277 is a similar design.

Classleader L1150 entered service on 21 April 1953 on a Sunday excursion train to Warburton as far as Lilydale. The final locomotive L1174 entered service on 3 August 1954. Because the electrification scheme was not completed until 1956, 12 were stored at Newport Workshops.

=== Design features ===
The L class design reflected a compromise between a requirement to haul freight loads of up to 1,400 tons up a 1 in 110 gradient, and a requirement for a low axle load in consideration of VR's typically lightly laid line infrastructure. Although English Electric recommended a heavier locomotive, VR engineers argued against anything above a 97 ton maximum.

In order to achieve the required weight reductions, a series of novel weight-saving measures were taken. The original round-ended nose design (which was to have resembled the EMD F7 nose used on the B class Diesel) was shortened and squared off to allow the frame to be reduced in size and weight, reducing the depth of the cabs and requiring the driver to enter the cab via the engine room. Masonite was used in place of sheet metal to line the cab interior, and acrylic sheet was used in place of glass on some of the cab windows.

The L class locomotive was also fitted with what was believed to be the most powerful dynamic brake in the world at the time, with L1150 able to maintain a steady 32 mph (51 km/h) leading a 1,100 ton test train on a 1 in 50 down-grade without use of the air brake. They were built with gauge convertible bogies to allow them to operate on standard gauge.

L class locomotives were capable of multiple unit operation, but only with other L class locomotives.

=== Regular service ===
In terms of power, the L class outclassed most of the VR fleet when introduced in 1953, surpassed only by steam locomotive H220. L1150 was able to better the performance of the famed S class in hauling a 600-ton load up the 1 in 50 gradient of Glenroy Bank. The L was also able to haul an 1,100 ton load between Dandenong and Oakleigh stations in around half the time taken by VR's most powerful freight locomotive, the X class, allowing heavy freight trains from Gippsland to avoid delaying suburban passenger services sharing the same route.

From introduction the class were maintained at the Jolimont Workshops in central Melbourne, along with the suburban multiple unit fleet and the E class suburban freight locomotives, as steam locomotives were housed at the North Melbourne Locomotive Depot. They were not moved to the new South Dynon Locomotive Depot until 1964.

The L class proved to be a fine locomotive for express passenger service where their high power output was put to good use hauling The Gippslander and other services at the line speed limit of 70 mph (112 km/h). However, in heavy freight service they were somewhat less successful, as their relatively light weight and low factor of adhesion caused them to slip on heavy loads. Despite this, they were regularly used to haul heavy briquette trains of over 1,000 tons from the Latrobe Valley to Melbourne. They could also be seen on some suburban freight services.

L class locomotives were equipped with two pantographs. The VR issued instructions for both pantographs to be raised in winter months, with the first pantograph serving to knock ice off the overhead catenary and ensure good contact for the second pantograph.

The fleet status as at 19 July 1986 is listed below:

Engine	Status	Livery
L1150	Under repair at Dynon	V/Line orange and grey
L1151	Under repair at Newport	Victorian Railways blue
L1152	Revenue service	Victorian Railways blue
L1153	Under repair at Newport	Victorian Railways blue
L1154	Under repair at Dynon	Victorian Railways blue
L1155	Revenue service	Victorian Railways blue
L1156	Revenue service	V/Line orange and grey
L1157	Under repair at Dynon	Victorian Railways blue
L1158	Under repair at Dynon	Victorian Railways blue
L1159	Revenue service	V/Line orange and grey
L1160	Under repair at Dynon	V/Line orange and grey
L1161	Revenue service	Victorian Railways blue
L1162	Revenue service	V/Line orange and grey
L1163	Scrapped at Newport	Victorian Railways blue
L1164	Scrapped at Newport	Victorian Railways blue
L1165	Not listed in source	Victorian Railways blue
L1166	Revenue service	Victorian Railways blue
L1167	Stored at Newport	Victorian Railways blue
L1168	Revenue service	Victorian Railways blue
L1169	Revenue service	V/Line orange and grey
L1170	Under repair at Dynon	Victorian Railways blue
L1171	Revenue service	Victorian Railways blue
L1172	Revenue service	Victorian Railways blue
L1173	Revenue service	Victorian Railways blue
L1174	Revenue service	V/Line orange and grey

In late 1986 L1166 was noted with modified side windows and marker lights, and with one of its two pantographs swapped over to a single-arm style. Various sightings show L1163 and L1173 with whistle(s) mounted on the noses instead of the top of the carbody at various points.

=== Accidents ===
The L class locomotives became known as "The Whispering Death" during their early years due to accidents attributed to their quietness of operation in comparison to the various Diesel locomotives operated by the VR at the time. A number of track workers were killed or seriously injured by L class locomotives whose rapid approach they were unable to hear until it was too late.

In early 1984, L1164 failed at Hernes Oak and was struck by the relief locomotive and withdrawn. In 1985, L1163 was involved in a derailment near Drouin after hitting a broken rail at 70 mph. The locomotive dug into the ballast and rotated through 180 degrees before rolling down an embankment. Remarkably, the crew climbed from the wreckage without serious injury and the derailed passenger carriages remained upright on the embankment, avoiding loss of life and serious injury among the passengers.

=== Demise ===
Because only one major line (the Gippsland line) had been electrified, the economic advantages of electric traction were not fully realised due to the need to change locomotives for trains that extended beyond the range of the electrified network, which added to the overall cost per mile. Furthermore, the additional expense associated with maintaining the 1,500 V DC overhead catenary system saw V/Line move to withdraw the L class from service and dewire the Gippsland line beyond Pakenham.

L1151-1155, 1157-1158, 1167-1168, 1170-1171 and L1173 were all out of service by mid-February 1987. L1154, 1158, 1168 and 1171 were all withdrawn on 14 January 1986; L1151 had been stored at Newport since 1981, and had more recently been joined by L1153, 1156, 1162 and 1174 for various periods. L1164 was cut up in 1985, but one of the noses was used to repair L1169 following a collision with a semi-trailer. Preservation attempts started around the end of 1986. L1165 and L1166 were withdrawn on 6 March 1987, followed by L1161 on 13 March 1987, incidentally around the same time that new diesel electric engines N471 and N472 were delivered.

By early May 1987 only eight units remained in service; L1150, 1156, 1158, 1160, 1162, 1169, 1172 and 1774. They had last been regularly used on passenger services on 14 February 1987 and from then on were almost entirely used on freight trains such as those serving Port Melbourne, which itself was due to close for conversion to light rail in the then-near future. The freight moves were scheduled for two engines, but up to four could appear to balance uneven traffic flows in opposite directions. The last L class freight train was scheduled on 30 May 1987, with a final special passenger working on 13 June. After that, all were expected to be scrapped except L1150, allocated to the Newport Railway Museum. Some components, such as the pantographs, couplers and speed recorders, were to be retained for re-use. The L class fleet were withdrawn from service by June 1987.

In August and September L1163 was cut up at Newport Workshops. At the same time L1153 was undergoing repainting to V/Line livery, but on completion it was stored outside the paint shop because its overhaul was still underway when the decision was made to begin scrapping the engines.

== Preservation ==
Four L class locomotives have survived into preservation, all based at Newport Workshops:

- L1150, named RG Wishart, is in static preservation at the Newport Railway Museum in Champion Road, Newport, painted in VR royal blue and gold livery.
- L1160 is owned by Steamrail Victoria and is currently in storage, painted in the 1980s tangerine and grey V/Line livery. It is unlikely to be restored.
- L1162 is owned by Steamrail Victoria and was restored to operating condition in February 1998, including a repaint in VR blue and gold livery. It has only been run occasionally, within the confines of the Steamrail Depot.
- L1169 is owned by Steamrail Victoria and is currently stored. It was used as a prop for the 2007 movie Ghost Rider, painted in a Texas Eagle livery for the filming. By March 2020, the Texas Eagle livery had faded, revealing the V/Line tangerine and grey livery underneath. A few months later it was repainted orange with yellow stripes for the filming of the 2022 Apple TV+ series, Shantaram.
