= Victorian Railways N class =

Class of Australian 2-8-2 steam locomotives

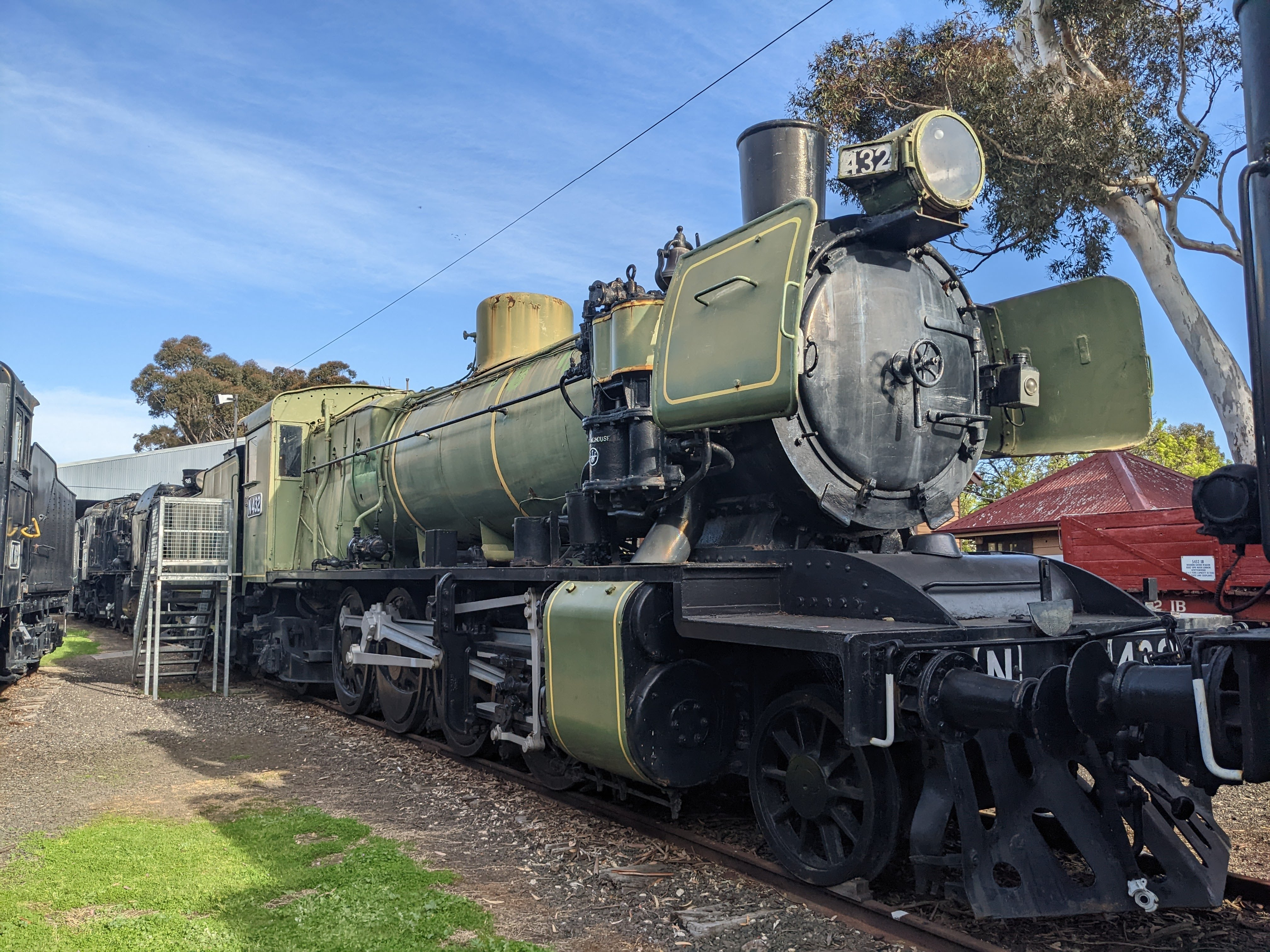
Type and origin
- Power type: Steam
- Builder: Newport Workshops; North British Locomotive Company
Specifications
- Configuration
  - Whyte: 2-8-2
- Gauge: 5 ft 3 in (1,600 mm)
- Driver dia.: 55 in (1,397 mm)
- Length: 67 ft 5 1/4 in (20.55 m)
- Axle load: 13 long tons 17 cwt (31,000 lb or 14.1 t)
- Adhesive weight: 53 long tons 2 cwt (118,900 lb or 54 t)
- Total weight: 124 long tons 16 cwt (279,600 lb or 126.8 t)
- Tender cap.: 6 long tons 0 cwt (13,400 lb or 6.1 t) coal or 1,500 imp gal (6,800 L; 1,800 US gal) oil, 4,700 imp gal (21,000 L; 5,600 US gal) water
- Firebox
  - Grate area: 31 sq ft (2.9 m^{2})
- Boiler pressure: 175 psi (12.1 bar; 1.21 MPa)
- Heating surface: 1,777 sq ft (165.1 m^{2})
- Cylinders: 2
- Cylinder size: 20 in × 26 in (508 mm × 660 mm)
Performance figures
- Tractive effort: 28,650 lbf (127.4 kN) at 85% boiler pressure
Career
- Number in class: 83

The N class is a branch line steam locomotive that ran on the Victorian Railways (VR) from 1925 to 1966. A development of the successful K class 2-8-0, it was the first VR locomotive class designed for possible conversion from 5 ft 3 in (1,600 mm) to 4 ft 8 1/2 in (1,435 mm) standard gauge.

== History ==
In 1923, in response to the recommendations made by the 1921 Royal Commission on the matter of uniform railway gauge, the VR announced a policy that all new locomotive designs were to be capable of conversion from broad to standard gauge. The rationale was that the task of converting VR from broad to standard gauge at a future date would be far easier if existing locomotives and rolling stock could be easily modified for standard gauge operation, rather than requiring expensive re-engineering or replacement.

The K class 2-8-0, built by the VR in 1922-23, was a success, but it was engineered for broad gauge operation only, having a firebox mounted between frames, so it was not readily gauge convertible. So when additional branch line locomotives were required, the VR produced a 2-8-2 "Mikado" variant of the K, the first 2-8-2 tender engine in Australia. It retained the same wheels, cylinders, motion, and much of the frame of the K, but featured a longer boiler with a wider, larger grate, mounted above the frames and supported by a trailing truck. That enabled possible gauge conversion without radical re-engineering of the frames and grate.

Despite those design features, no N class locomotive ever ran on standard gauge. By the time the standard gauge Albury to Melbourne mainline opened in 1962, alongside the existing broad gauge line, steam locomotives were rapidly being withdrawn from service. Large-scale standardisation of Australia's broad gauge rail network did not get under way until 1995, nearly thirty years after the withdrawal of the N class.

=== Production ===
Twenty N class locomotives were built by Newport Workshops between 1925 and 1928. A second batch of ten locomotives followed in 1930 and 1931. They went into service with road numbers N 110–139.

A third batch of fifty locomotives was built in 1949-1950 by North British Locomotive Company, as part of Operation Phoenix, the post-war rebuilding of Victorian Railways. A fourth batch of twenty N class, of a modified design, was also ordered from Newport Workshops. At that time, the class was renumbered, with numbers 400-429 assigned to the pre-war Newport locomotives, 450-499 assigned to the North British locomotives, and 430-449 reserved for the post-war Newport locomotives. However, production of the fourth batch ceased in 1951, after only three had been built, because the VR opted to order more of a new design of 2-8-0 branch line locomotive, the J class.

The VR sold ten of the North British-built N class locomotives (461, 465, 471, 474, 477, 485, 490, 491, 494 and 495) to the South Australian Railways, which was experiencing a severe motive power shortage. They became that system's 750 class. Many of those locomotives had only run a few days in VR service before being transferred to the SAR.

Thus although a total of 83 N class locomotives were built, only 73 were in VR service for a substantial period of time.

=== Regular service ===
The N class had an axle load almost as light as that of the K and so were able to travel on much of VR light-lines network, which was built with 60 lb/yd (29.8 kg/m) rail. However, the N class was more limited in area of operation than the K, because its wheelbase was too long for the 50-and-53-foot (15 and 16 m) turntables used on many branch lines.

Notwithstanding the limitation of their longer wheelbase, the locomotives were widely used on both branch line and main line goods services. Later in their life, N class locomotives were a common sight assisting other locomotives on heavy wheat trains heading for the ports of Geelong or Portland, or shunting in yards such as at Ararat.

A later highlight in the operating life of the class was the assignment of Newport-built N 430 to haul the special Centenary-Jubilee Train in 1951 marking the centenary of the establishment of the Colony of Victoria and the jubilee of the establishment of the Commonwealth of Australia. That special train, containing valuable artworks and manuscripts from the National Gallery of Victoria, as well as Commonwealth and Victorian Government displays, consisted of N 430 plus eleven BPL#1942 Hospital carriages, 1951 Jubilee Train coaches and a van, painted in a special green and gold livery. It travelled 6,000 miles (9,700 km) throughout Victoria from 1 February to 30 June 1951, visiting 168 stations and attracting 548,000 people to inspect its onboard exhibits. At the end of June the Victorian exhibits were removed and o 9 July 1951 the whole train transferred to Adelaide, running around South Australia through to mid-October 1951 before being returned. After the tour the bell from N430 was removed, but it otherwise stayed relatively clean in its green livery through at least 21 May 1956, after which it was repainted black.

The ten N class locomotives sold to the South Australian Railways saw service on lightly built lines branching from Tailem Bend into the Murray Mallee. They were unpopular with crews owing to their cabs being more cramped than other SAR locomotives.

=== Design improvements ===
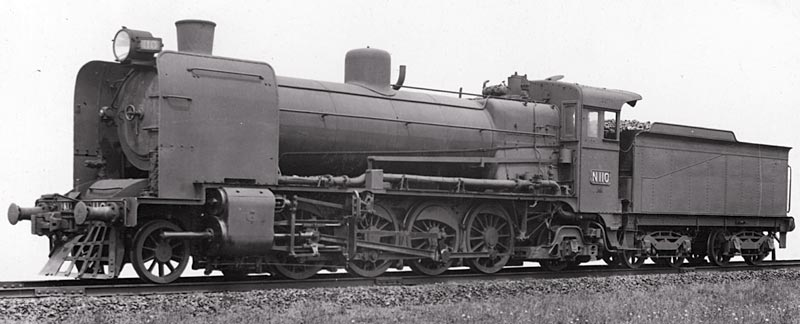
N 110, in an official VR photograph c.1936, shows a dramatically altered appearance after being equipped with Modified Front End and booster engine.

In 1927, class leader N 110 was equipped with a two-cylinder Franklin booster engine which drove the trailing truck axle. Based on the success of that device, the VR built all but two of the much larger X class 2-8-2s with booster engines. The VR also modified the design of the Delta trailing truck on the second (1930-31 built) batch of N class locomotives to enable easy retrofitting of booster engines. Despite that, no further boosters were fitted and, in December 1944, the booster from N 110 was removed, then shortly thereafter fitted to one of the two non-booster-equipped X class locomotives.

In 1936, class leader N 110 was again selected to test new features, this time a series of design changes for improved drafting and reduced cylinder back pressure, referred to as "modified front end", which had already been successfully applied to the C class locomotive. The performance of N 110 was dramatically improved, and all the original thirty N class locomotives were similarly equipped. The most visible change resulting from those enhancements was that their original cast iron funnels were replaced by a less ornate "flowerpot" funnel. They also received other improvements during that period, such as the fitting of cross-compound air compressors and smoke deflectors.

The post-war N class locomotives had a revised boiler design featuring a combustion chamber firebox and thermic syphons. The final batch of three Newport-built locomotives had a further evolution of the design, with German "Witte"-style smoke deflectors, and boxpok wheels.

With industrial action in the late 1940s threatening black coal supplies, the VR began to convert the class to burn fuel oil, commencing with N 460 in September 1951. However, only 36 conversions were completed before the program was cancelled in 1956, following the arrival of large numbers of diesel electric locomotives.

=== Demise ===
The introduction of the T class diesel electric locomotive on VR's branch lines from 1955 onwards, led to progressive retirement of the N class. Many were put into storage, to be used only for seasonal grain traffic. Wholesale withdrawals occurred during 1965 and 1966. The final run of the class was in October 1966, when N 468 and N 475 hauled an Australian Railway Historical Society special passenger train.

In South Australia, the new 830 class diesel electrics began to displace branch line steam power. Most of the 750 class had been withdrawn by 1962, and locomotive 752 steamed for the last time in November 1964.

== Accidents and incidents ==
- At around midnight on 15 January 1966, N476 was at the Ararat Locomotive Depot when J503 became a runaway and rear-ended N476, causing that locomotive to crash through the wall of the depot. N476 was damaged beyond repair and was scrapped after the wreck.

== Preservation ==
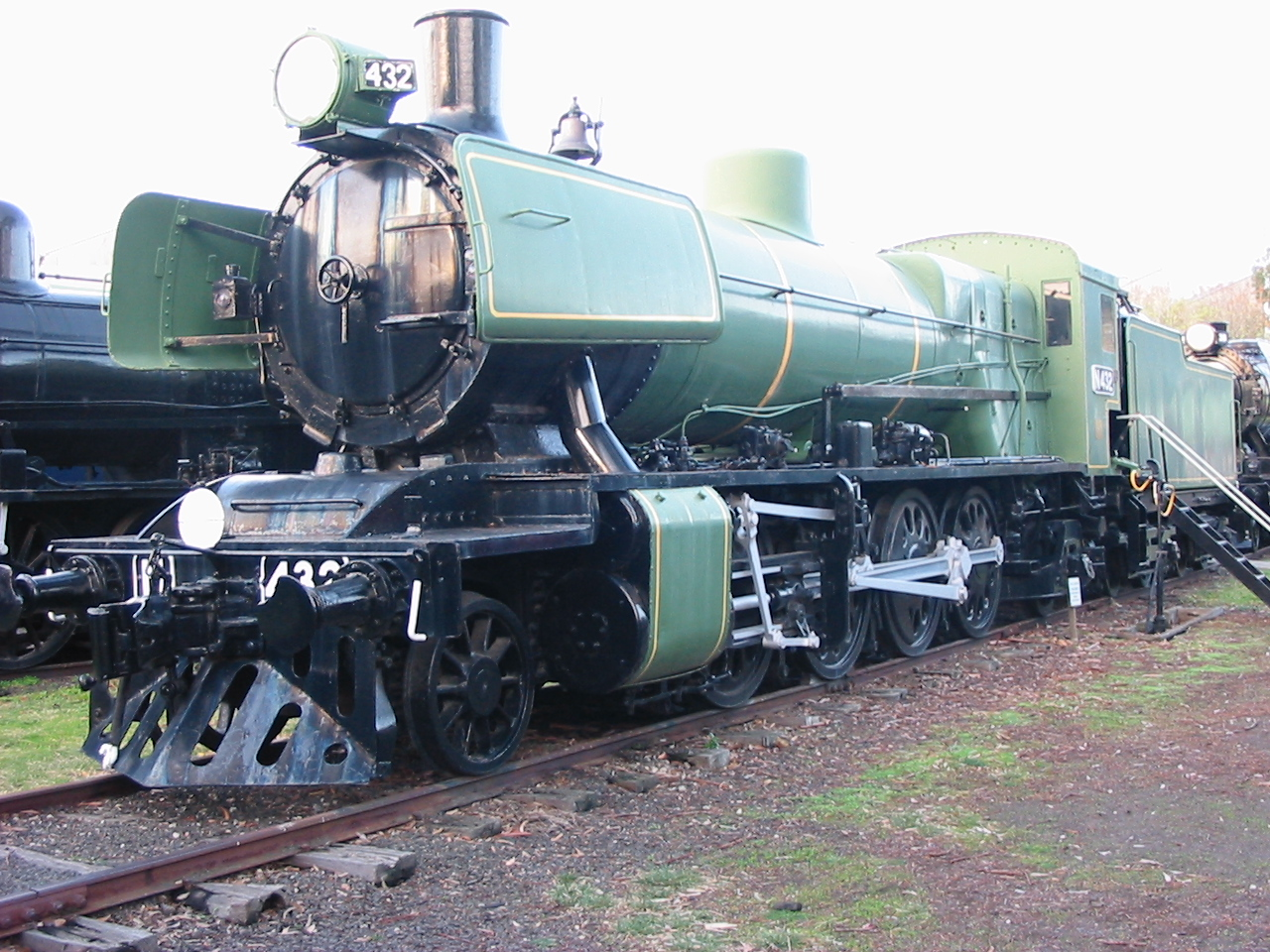
N 432 in static preservation at the Newport Railway Museum. The final iteration of the N class, it features a revised cab design, including an automatic staff exchange apparatus, boxpok driving wheels, combustion chamber firebox, and revised Witte-pattern smoke deflectors. Its green and gold livery was applied to N 430 for the 1951 Centenary-Jubilee train.

Despite the relatively large number of N class locomotives built, all but one of the 73 locomotives remaining on the VR after 1951 were scrapped.

N 432, the last of the group of three N locomotives built by Newport Workshops in 1951, was withdrawn from service in 1966 after a service life of just 211,303 miles (340,059 km). It is preserved at the Newport Railway Museum. As well as its historical value as the only remaining N class locomotive, N 432 is also notable for being the last steam locomotive built by the VR Newport Workshops.

In addition to N 432, one of the ten locomotives built by the North British Locomotive Co. and sold to the SAR also remains. No. 752 (originally VR N 477), withdrawn after a service life of 262,593 miles (422,602 km), is preserved at the National Railway Museum, Port Adelaide.

=== N441 Project ===
A preservation group was founded in 2002 to reconstruct a Victorian Railways N class locomotive. A feasibility study was conducted for the N441 Steam Locomotive Project to investigate the viability of converting a K class frame into that of a first-series Victorian Railways N class, using the frames and wheels of locomotive K 154, together with one of the remaining spare N class boilers, and constructing a trailing axle with components acquired from a number of state heritage assets.
