= Steamrail Victoria =

Volunteer group in Victoria, Australia

- Formation: 1965
- Type: Volunteer organisation
- Purpose: Restoration and operation of heritage rolling stock
- Headquarters: Newport Workshops
- Coordinates: 37°51′3″S 144°52′48″E
- Website: www.steamrail.com.au

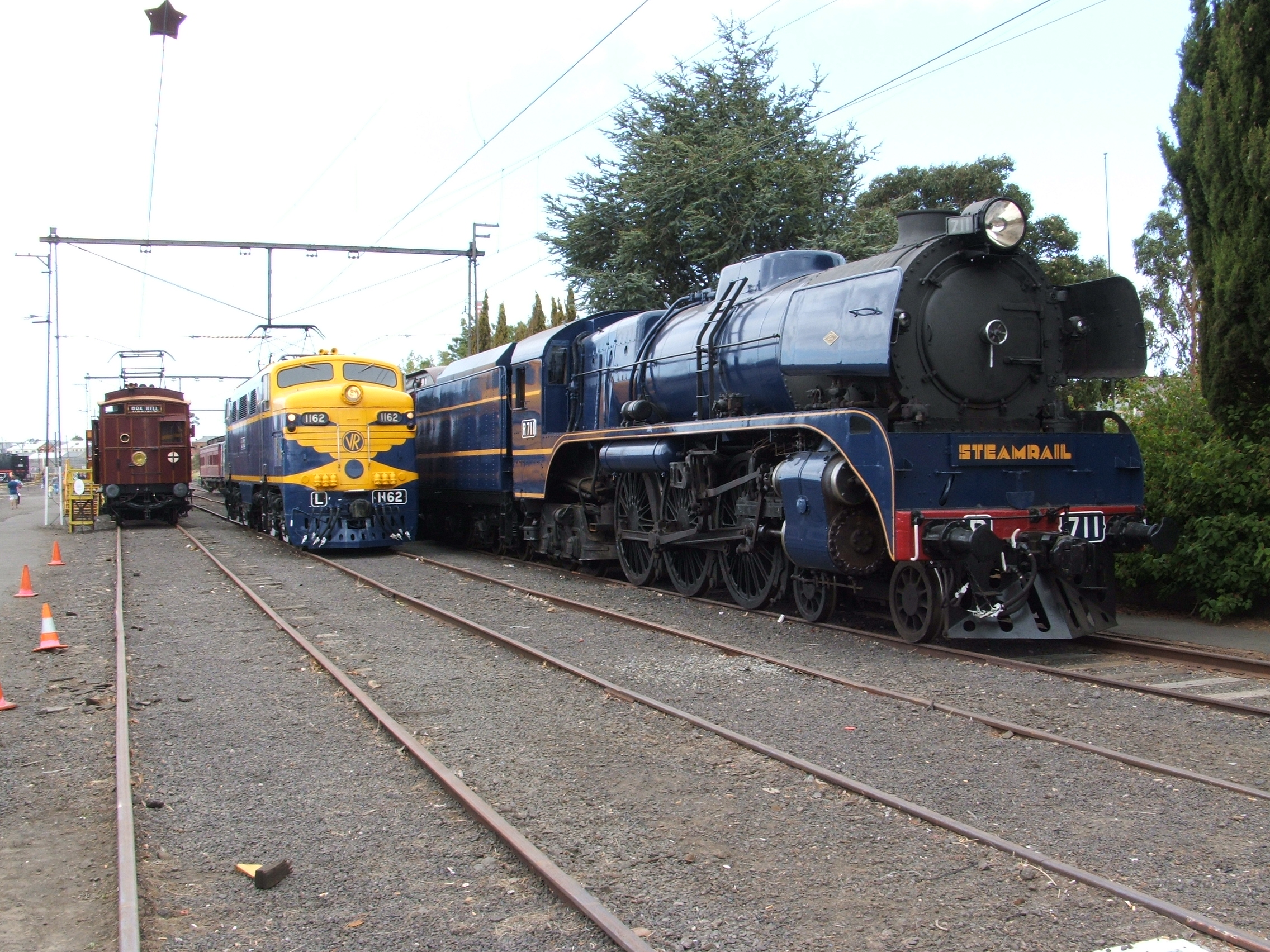
2007 open day at the Steamrail Victoria depot: R 711 beside an L class electric locomotive and Swing Door suburban train

Steamrail Victoria is a not-for-profit volunteer group established in 1965 to restore and operate historic locomotives and rolling stock used on the railways in Victoria, Australia. The main depot of the group is at the Newport Workshops ('West Block') in suburban Melbourne. In addition to operating railfan special trains and charters for private groups, the group also operates special steam trains in the Melbourne suburban area. Steamrail regularly tours the state, including participation in annual events such as the Ballarat Heritage Weekend (steam locomotive Y112 is used to shuttle between Ballarat and Sulky Gully/Lal Lal). Steamrail Victoria previously leased diesel locomotives to freight operators such as Southern Shorthaul Railroad (SSR) & Qube Logistics as required. Locomotives were also hired to El Zorro until they ceased trading.

The group has custody of a number of Victorian Railways steam locomotives, including the R, D3 and K classes; in addition to several diesel electric locomotives, and various suburban electric rolling stock. Heritage carriages include former Victorian Railways wooden 'E' and 'W' types, steel air conditioned 'S' type carriages, and former South Australian Railways steel country cars in the 500-600-700 classes.

== Locomotives ==
=== Steam locomotives ===
Number	Image	Year built	Builder	Status	Max Speed km/h Metro Network	Max Speed km/h	Notes
A^{2} 986		1915	Newport Workshops	Operational	80	80	Re-entered service on 13 May 2017 after a 30-year restoration
D^{3} 608		1908	Newport Workshops	Stored	95	95	Stored at Ballarat East
D^{3} 638		1916	Newport Workshops	Stored	95	95	Stored at Ballarat East
D^{3} 639/658		1903	Newport Workshops	Operational	95	95	Restored in 1984. Painted in the Victorian Railways Commissioner's Loco livery (black and red). Occasionally runs with its original number D^{3} 658
D^{3} 641		1915	Newport Workshops	Stored	95	95	Stored at Ballarat East
D^{3} 677		1917	Newport Workshops	Stored	95	95	Stored at Newport Workshops (West Block)
D^{3} 688		1912	Newport Workshops	Stored	95	95	Stored at Ballarat East
K151		1940	Newport Workshops	Stored	80	80	Stored at Newport Workshops (West Block)
K153			Newport Workshops	Operational	80	80	Restored in 1983. Masqueraded as K100 and K140 for 100 years of the K class in 2022/23
K183		1943	Newport Workshops	Operational	80	80	Originally restored in 1992, suffered damage in a level crossing accident at Benalla in October 2002 and was stored at Newport Workshops East Block until June 30, 2020 when it was transferred to Steamrail's workshops. After an assessment on the condition of the engine, Steamrail have decided to restore the locomotive to mainline operating standard. On October 7, 2021, K183 made its first mainline appearance since 2002 performing several test runs on the Newport–Sunshine line. K183 officially returned to service on April 24, 2022
K184		1945	Newport Workshops	Stored for future long term restoration	80	80	Stored at Newport Workshops (East Block). Was used on heritage services with Steamrail Victoria through the 1970s, painted all over gloss black with red frames and buffer beams. The engine was withdrawn in 1980 due to poor mechanical condition
K190		1946	Newport Workshops	Operational	80	80	Restored in 1979. Painted in a LMS inspired livery
R700		1951	North British Locomotive Company, Glasgow	Stored for future long term restoration	115	115	Stored at Newport Workshops (West Block). Partially cosmetically restored for the 2020 Steamrail Open Days
R711		1951	North British Locomotive Company, Glasgow	Operational	115	115	Restored by West Coast Railway in 1998. Entered service with Steamrail in 2012. Currently the only mainline certified oil-burner in Victoria
R761		1952	North British Locomotive Company, Glasgow	Operational	115	115	Restored in 1985
R766		1952	North British Locomotive Company, Glasgow	Operational	N/A	80 (NSW Speed Restriction)	In 2026, R766 became the first Victorian steam locomotive to operate over the Sydney suburban rail network and into Sydney Central station.
Y112		1889	Phoenix Foundry, Ballarat	Operational	65	65	Restored in 1996. Occasionally runs with its original number Y419. Based at Ballarat East. Withdrawn from service in May 2022 to receive new driving wheels and tires. Returned to service on November 22, 2025 following the overhaul

=== Diesel locomotives ===
Number	Image	Year built	Builder	Status	Max Speed km/h	Notes
B63		1952	Clyde Engineering, Granville	Stored	115	Currently stored at Newport workshops.
B72		1953	Clyde Engineering, Granville	Under Restoration	115	Operationally limited, still under restoration.
M231		1959	Newport Workshops	Operational	12	
M232		1959	Newport Workshops	stored	12	Currently stored at Newport workshops.
S301		1957	Clyde Engineering, Granville	Operational	115	Donated by Pacific National in March 2024.
S313		1961	Clyde Engineering, Granville	Operational	115	
T356		1959	Clyde Engineering, Granville	Operational	100	
T364		1962	Clyde Engineering, Granville	Operational	100	On loan to the Victorian Goldfields Railway as of 22nd August 2026.
T395		1965	Clyde Engineering, Granville	Operational	100	
Y164		1968	Clyde Engineering, Granville	Operational	65	Newport Workshops shunter.

== Electric rolling stock ==
=== Locomotives ===
Number	Image	Year built	Builder	Status	Max Speed km/h	Notes
E1106		1929	VR Newport and Jolimont Workshops	Non-operational	65	Stored at Newport workshops
E1108		1929	VR Newport and Jolimont Workshops	Non-operational	65	Stored at Newport workshops
E1109		1929	VR Newport and Jolimont Workshops	Non-operational	65	Stored at Newport workshops
L1160		1953	English Electric	Non- operational	115	Stored at Newport workshops
L1162		1953	English Electric	Operational	115	Stored at Newport workshops pending equipment upgrades for mainline accreditation
L1169		1954	English Electric	Non- operational	115	Stored at Newport. Used as a prop for 2007 Film Ghost Rider with "Texas Eagle" paint job. Repainted to Indian Railways livery in 2021 for TV Series Shantaram

=== Swing Door electrics ===
Number	Image	Year built as carriage	Year converted to Electric car	Builder (Electric)	Status	Max Speed km/h	Notes
107 M		1888 as 85 AA	1920	Newport Workshops	Destroyed	80	Destroyed in fire at Newport Workshops in 2015
137 M		1907 as 22 BDBD	1920	Newport Workshops	Destroyed	80	Destroyed in fire at Newport Workshops in 2015
93 M		1889 as 110 AA	1919	Newport Workshops	Under restoration	80	Under restoration after being recovered from paddock in Mooroopna in 2017
113 M		1888 as 35 AA	1920	Newport Workshops	Stored	80	Former Jolimont Workshops Pilot
156 M		1900 as 2 BDBD	1917	Newport Workshops	Stored	80	Former Jolimont Workshops Pilot
24 D		1904 as 72 ABAB	1923	Newport Workshops	Destroyed	80	Destroyed in fire at Newport Workshops in 2015
12 BT		1890 as 173 AA	1919	Newport Workshops	Destroyed	80	Destroyed in fire at Newport Workshops in 2015

=== Tait electrics ===
Number	Image	Year built as carriage	Year converted to Electric car	Builder (Electric)	Status	Max Speed km/h	Notes
2 CM		-	1921	Newport Workshops	Stored	80	Parcels motor
267 M		1917 as 67 ACPM	1917	Newport Workshops	Stored	80	Stored in Lot 100
284 M		1918 as 84 BCPM	1918	Newport Workshops	Stored	80	Stored in East Block
317 M		1915 as 42 BCP	1915	Newport Workshops	Operational	80	
327 M		1915 as 52 BCP	1915	Newport Workshops	Under restoration	80	
381 M		1918 as 88 BCPM	1918	Newport Workshops	Operational	80	
427 M		1915 as 427 M	1915	Newport Workshops	Stored	80	Stored in East Block
471 M		1922 as 398 M	1922	Newport Workshops	Under restoration	80	Unique double end configuration, Stored in East Block.
470 M		1915 as 25 BCP	1921	Newport Workshops	Under restoration	80	Unique double end configuration
230 D		1910 as 3 ACP	1965	Newport Workshops	Operational	80	
257 D		1913 as 30 ACP	1969	Newport Workshops	Stored	80	Stored in Lot 100
201 BT		1950 as 201 BT		Newport Workshops	Stored	80	Stored in Lot 100
208 T		1910 as 8 AP	1919	Newport Workshops	Operational	80	
341 T		1913 as 55 BP	1922	Newport Workshops	Operational	80	
48 G		-	1924	Newport Workshops	Stored	80	Dual lighting (Gas/Electric), Stored in East Bloc

== Passenger carriages ==
=== E cars ===
Carriage	Image	Year built	Colour	Max Speed km/h	Notes
3 ABE		15 August 1908	Red and Gold	80	First / Second Class - Compartment Style - Half Carpet Floor
7 ABE		30 June 1909	Red	80	First / Second Class - Compartment Style - Kiosk
12 AE		28 August 1908	Blue and gold	80	First Class - Compartment Style - Air Conditioning
1 BCE		10 February 1910	Red	80	Guards Van / Second Class - Compartment Style
5 BCE		23 December 1909	Red	80	Guards Van / Second Class - Compartment Style - Stored
2 BE		28 August 1906	Red	80	Second Class - Compartment Style - Stored
3 BE		31 October 1906	Red	80	Second Class - Compartment Style - Stored
4 BE		31 October 1906	Blue and gold	80	Second Class - Compartment Style - Air Conditioning Under restoration
17 BE		15 August 1908	Red	80	Second Class - Compartment Style
25 BE		16 July 1909	Red	80	Second Class - Compartment Style
38 BE		3 December 1910	Red	80	Second Class - Compartment Style
46 BE		3 March 1910	Red	80	Second Class - Compartment Style - Carpet Floor
18 CE		24 February 1911	Blue and gold	80	Guards Van
1 HW		19 December 1910	Red	80	Weedex Crew Car - Formerly 37 AE - Stored

=== W cars ===
Carriage	Image	Year built	Colour	Max Speed km/h	Notes
32 ABU		2 April 1914	Red	80	First / Second Class - Compartment Style - Stored
40 ABU		25 June 1914	Red	80	First / Second Class - Compartment Style - Stored
25 AW		5 July 1918	Red	80	First Class - Compartment Style - Stored
64 AW		8 April 1927	Red and gold	80	First Class - Compartment Style
60 BW		1 October 1926	Red and gold	80	Second Class - Compartment Style - Stored
61 BW		30 July 1926	Red and gold	80	Second Class - Compartment Style
63 BW		9 July 1926	Red	80	Second Class - Compartment Style
67 BW		13 April 1927	Red	80	Second Class - Compartment Style
68 BW		12 April 1927	Red	80	Second Class - Compartment Style
70 BW		8 July 1927	Red	80	Second Class - Compartment Style - Stored
71 BW		18 June 1926	Red	80	Second Class - Compartment Style - Stored
80 BW		23 April 1926	Red	80	Second Class - Compartment Style - On loan to the VGR
14 CW		18 January 1914	Red	80	Guards Van

=== K cars ===
Carriage	Image	Year built	Colour	Max Speed km/h	Gauge	Notes
500 AK		5 December 1936	Blue and gold	115	SG	First Class - Compartment Style Leased to The Picnic Train
502 AK		17 February 1937	Blue and gold	115	SG	First Class - Compartment Style Leased to The Picnic Train
600 BK		19 December 1936	Blue and gold	115	BG	Second Class - Compartment Style
603 BK		11 May 1937	Blue and gold	115	SG	Second Class - Compartment Style Leased to The Picnic Train
604 BK		23 July 1937	Blue and gold	115	SG	Second Class - Compartment Style Leased to The Picnic Train
605 BK		24 August 1937	Blue and gold	115	SG	Second Class - Compartment Style Leased to The Picnic Train
700 BK		9 July 1940	Blue and gold	115	BG	Second Class - Saloon Style
702 BK		13 August 1940	Blue and gold	115	BG	Second Class - Saloon Style
703 BK		28 August 1940	Explorer	115	BG	Second Class - Saloon Style - Stored Fire Damaged
711 BK		19 July 1941	West Coast Railway	115	BG	Second Class - Saloon Style - Stored Fire Damaged
751 AK		29 June 1942	ANR	115	BG	Second Class - Saloon Style - Stored. Numbered BE 358
782 AK		19 March 1942	ANR	115	BG	Second Class - Saloon Style - Stored

=== S cars ===
Carriage	Image	Year built	Colour	Max Speed km/h	Notes
5 AS		14 November 1937	Blue and gold	115	First Class - Compartment Style
8 AS		14 May 1940	Blue and gold	115	First Class - Compartment Style
11 AS		22 March 1949	Blue and gold	115	First Class - Compartment Style
9 BRS		2 December 1948	Red and silver	115	Second Class - Compartment Style - Buffet
14 BRS		14 December 1956	Blue and gold	115	Second Class - Compartment Style - Buffet
2 BS		14 November 1937	Blue and gold	115	Second Class - Compartment Style

=== N cars ===
Carriage	Image	Year built	Colour	Max Speed km/h	Notes
ACN 24		7 June 1982	PTV	115	First Class with Guards Compartment - Saloon Style - Standard Gauge Leased to The Picnic Train
BRN 34		17 December 1982	PTV	115	Economy Class with Buffet - Saloon Style - Standard Gauge Leased to The Picnic Train
BN 7		18 December 1981	PTV	115	Economy Class - Saloon Style - Standard Gauge Leased to The Picnic Train
BN 10		19 February 1982	PTV	115	Economy Class - Saloon Style - Standard Gauge Leased to The Picnic Train

=== V cars ===
Carriage	Image	Year built	Colour	Max Speed km/h	Notes
1 AV		16 June 1897	Red	65	First Class - Compartment Style - Stored
32 AV		26 October 1899	Red	65	First Class - Compartment Style - Stored
7 BV		29 March 1898	Red	65	Second Class - Compartment Style - Stored
18 BV		31 August 1899	Red	65	Second Class - Compartment Style - Stored
12 BL		30 June 1893	Red	65	Second Class - End Platform Compartment Style with Saloon - Stored 'Enterprise'
13 BL		30 June 1893	Red	65	Second Class - End Platform Compartment Style with Saloon - Stored 'Pioneer'

=== Special carriages ===
Carriage	Image	Year built	Colour	Max Speed km/h	Notes
Moorabool		1 June 1939	Blue and gold	115	Club / Dance Car
601 Tweed		2 March 1937	Blue and gold	115	Dining Car - Standard Gauge Leased to The Picnic Train
607 Richmond		24 November 1937	Blue and gold	115	Dining Car – Under Restoration
SJ 282 Tantini		7 March 1950	Overland Maroon	115	Roomette Sleeping Car - Air Conditioning
SJ 283 Weroni		9 December 1950	V/Line Orange (Vinelander)	115	Twinette Sleeping Car - Air Conditioning
4 AZ		26 November 1957	PTV	115	Ex BTN254, retired from V/Line service July 2023
269 BZ Hobsons Bay		4 December 1958	Blue and gold	115	Multifunction/Dance Car
Goulburn		23 November 1908	Red and gold	80	Twinshare Sleeping Car (SRV Crew Car)
Inman		22 August 1923	Red	80	Twinshare Sleeping Car
Coliban		22 August 1923	Red	80	Twinshare Sleeping Car
Wando		14 September 1923	Red	80	Twinshare Sleeping Car
Indi		14 April 1928	Blue and gold	80	Twinshare Sleeping Car - Air Conditioning
Werribee		14 April 1928	Blue and gold	80	Twinshare Sleeping Car - Air Conditioning
24 CP		3 February 1958	Blue	115	Guards Van - Standard Gauge. Leased to The Picnic Train.
34 CP		28 April 1958	Red	115	Ex 291 CP, Guards Van
37 CP			Red/Grey	115	Reclassed 37 VVCP, has had it bogies removed and plinthed in the yard.
292 PCP		17 September 1957	Blue and gold	115	Power Van
PCJ 491		18 September 1970	Silver		Power Van
Carey		26 August 1901	Blue and Gold	80	Shower Car (formerly Horsebox DFDF 1, Guards Van C 43)
VZVF 1		16 May 1955	Black	95	Water Tank Wagon - 33640L Capacity. Built as WX 1.
VOAF 9		5 July 1927	Red	95	Bogie Open Wagon for Coal Transport - 45t Capacity. Built as E 9
ELX 244		24 September 1969	Red and Gold	95	Ex VOBX 244. Bogie Open Wagon for Coal Transport - 51t Capacity
WT 49		16 July 1902	Red	65	Water Tank Wagon - 9000L Capacity
470 ZD		27 June 1914	Red	80	Guards Van – Used as Transition Vehicle for shunting the Tait Train – Under Restoration
600 ZD		30 March 1928	Red	80	Guards Van – Used as Transition Vehicle for shunting the Tait Train

== See also ==
- Tourist and Heritage Railways Act
