= Victorian Railways M class (diesel-hydraulic) =

Victorian Railways M Class
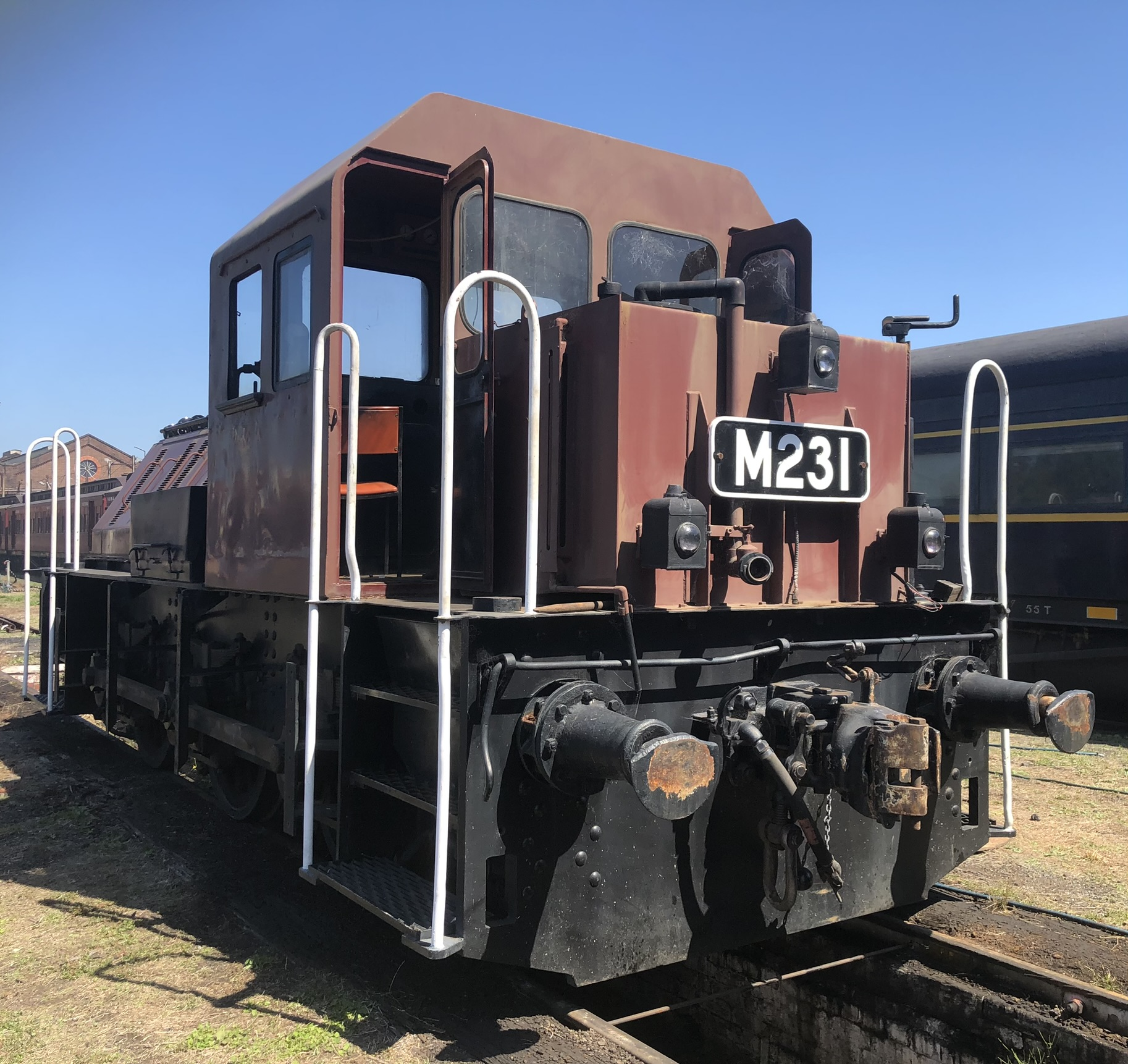
- M class M231 at Steamrail's open day in March, 2022
Type and origin
- Power type: Diesel-hydraulic
- Builder: Victorian Railways
- Build date: 1959
- Total produced: 2
Specifications
- Configuration
  - Whyte: 0-6-0
  - UIC: 0-6-0
- Gauge: 5 ft 3 in (1,600 mm)
- Length: 8.45 m (27 ft 9 in)
- Loco weight: 31.00 t (30.51 long tons; 34.17 short tons)
- Prime mover: EMD 6-71 6080
Performance figures
- Maximum speed: 20 km/h (12 mph)
- Power output: 112 kilowatts (150 hp)
Career
- Number in class: 2
- Numbers: M231, M232
- First run: 1959

The Victorian Railways M class are a diesel-hydraulic powered railway shunting locomotive, constructed at Newport workshops of the Victorian Railways in Victoria, Australia and used between 1959 and 1987.

== History ==
In the 1950s the Victorian Railways were looking for alternative locomotive power to replace the ageing fleet of steam locomotive which were used for shunting duties. To aid in the replacement of the steam locomotives, in 1959, two shunting locomotives were built by the Victorian Railways at their Newport Workshops. These locomotives featured an Ellison TC 500 diesel-hydraulic transmission powered by an 112 kilowatts (150 hp) EMD power unit, and were fitted with the same wheels as those on the F Class locomotives. M232 was briefly the final locomotive built at Newport Workshops, until later-build V56 was retroactively considered a locomotive.

The two engines were given class M and the numbers 231 and 232. When introduced, both locomotives wore a plain, dark red livery with black under frame, similar to the Victorian Railways V class. Both locomotives later in their life would be repainted into the traditional Victorian Railways blue and gold livery. The two M class locomotives would almost exclusively operate in the Newport Workshops compound under the ownership of the Victorian Railways. They did occasionally substitute for other shunting engines, such as M231 at Warragul for a few days in March 1960, when the normal engine D^{3} 680 was briefly reallocated to Traralgon.

== Private ownership ==
M231 was sold to Steamrail Victoria on 17 December 1981, where it would continue to be operated in the Newport workshop compound.

M232 was sold to Brunswick Plaster Mills, a subsidiary of CSR Limited, on 9 February 1981. M232 would haul gypsum trains from Nowingi, to a gypsum loader on the former Millewa South line. After the closure of the Nowingi gypsum operation in 1987, M232 would fall under the ownership of Steamrail Victoria and would be transferred back to Newport workshops in 1988.

As of 2024, M231 is operational as a shunting locomotive for Steamrail Victoria and is currently painted in its original red paint scheme with a black under-frame. It is notable that M231 has worked its entire life in the Newport Workshops compound. M232 is currently stored in Newport Workshops West block.

== Locomotives ==
Locomotive	Entered service	Withdrawn	Owner	Status
M231	13 Mar 1959	17 Dec 1981	Steamrail	Preserved – operational
M232	17 Jun 1959	09 Feb 1981	Steamrail	Stored
