= Victorian Railways livestock transport =

Livestock transport
- Manufacturer: Victorian Railways
- Built at: Newport Workshops
- Replaced: Each other
- Constructed: From 1858; 168 years ago
- Number under construction: 2,400+
- Operator: Victorian Railways
- Line served: All

Specifications
- Track gauge: 5 ft 3 in (1,600 mm)

The Victorian Railways used a variety of railway wagons for the transport of livestock.

== History ==
One of the commodities carried by the early Victorian Railways was livestock. Also, from the mid-19th century, horse vans were employed to transfer racing horses from stations on country branch lines, to the nearest racecourse.

By the 1950s, the rise of road transport saw the loss of a number of short branch lines, particularly those where the only traffic had been timber or livestock. From 1974 to the 1980s intrastate road freight was deregulated, and rail 'common carrier' obligations were removed, resulting in the loss to road of much non-bulk freight.

By 1979, only a small number of livestock wagons remained in service, approximately 50 vehicles in two main classes: one double deck for sheep and pigs, and the other single deck for cattle. The carriage of livestock by rail finally ended in 1986.

== Cattle wagons ==
=== M wagons and variations ===
Starting in 1897 and finishing in the 1950s, a total of 879 M class cattle wagons were constructed. The design was relatively standard, remaining unchanged up to wagon no.779. Wagons 780 to 879 had altered ends and the GY handbrake system.

As per the normal practice of the era, scrapped wagons were replaced with new wagons of the same numbers, from 1893 to 1925.

Three wagons were fitted with altered roofs, and were used in circus traffic. They were known as the "elephant wagons" and lasted until about 1930, when they were replaced with new vans constructed from steel.

=== MU temporary louvre wagons ===
During the Autocoupler Conversion project of the 1920s, severe shortages of louvre vans occurred. As a result, 50 M vans were boarded up and reclassed to MU to fill the gap. They were used for all sorts of traffic, even for bagged wheat in 1923. The vans were all converted back to M by 1934.

The MU numbers can be found on Peter J Vincent's site, but they ranged from the low 300's to the mid 400's.

=== MS superphosphate wagons ===
Around the early 1960s, there was a shortage of wagons for carrying superphosphate. Due to the lack of alternatives, even with over 24,000 wagons running at the time, 70 cattle wagons were lined with tarpaulins on the inside, and loaded by hand. They were reclassed as the MS wagons. By the 1970s they were either scrapped or returned to M wagon status.

=== MB wagons ===
In 1969, 2 M wagons were specially converted for the carriage of bulls between Melbourne and Wodonga. The modification was the removal of one plank from each side of the wagon, which was then replaced by a metal lashing rail to which a bull could be secured. MB1 was converted from M416 and MB2 was converted from M391.

=== MC cattle containers ===
By the 1970s, containerisation was starting to become popular, and so the M-series wagons were slowly being replaced by MC containers, which could be placed on container wagons. This was not for transshipment purposes, but because when the cattle fitting was not in use the container wagon could be used in regular traffic.

Around the mid-1980s, the laws regarding cattle transport changed, and this deregulation caused cattle transport to vanish from the rails practically overnight. The remaining M wagons were sold or scrapped, and the MC containers were stored for years before being sold off interstate.

A tender was published on 25 February 1987 for the purchase and removal of fifty MC cattle containers then stored at Dynon Yard.

=== MM wagons ===
As cattle traffic increased, it was found that more wagons were needed. The Victorian Railways decided on a bogie design rather than more four-wheelers. So in 1928, 25 vans were constructed, the MM class.

When built the MM's had half the autocoupler equipment fitted, but had transition hooks for compatibility purposes. These were swapped for the full automatic couplers between 1933 and 1936.

From 1965, the wagons had bogies altered for higher speed trains, and so the wagons were reclassed MF. This lasted until the 1979 recoding, by which time only wagons 2–5, 10, 15, 20-22 and 25 remained. These 10 wagons were reclassed to VSBY, indicating that they were not bogie-exchangeable.

The wagons were removed from service in the mid-1980s.

== Sheep wagons ==
=== L, LB wagons ===
The first L class sheep truck was constructed in 1877, and construction continued through to 1953. The class was numbered from 1 to 1432, but of this, about 30 numbers did not get used. Because of the aforementioned policy of reusing numbers, there were about 1,650 of these wagons built. Over time, older wagons were scrapped and newer wagons, of a more modern design, were built with the same numbers as the scrapped L wagons.

This was shown most obviously, because wagons up to L1236, built up to December 1924, are fitted with gable roofs. The final 196 wagons, numbers 1237 and on, have curved roofs and were built with auto-couplers from new.

The wagons could be used for pigs and goats as well as sheep, but the latter was the primary traffic. Because of this the wagons often ran in groups, but these were not defined on paper.

Most of the gable-roof vans were auto-coupled between 1931 and 1933. However, 50 of the wagons were only fitted with auto-couplers at one end, and this was used to semi-permanently couple them in pairs, with the chain couplings on the outside of these pairs. The wagons were relettered to LB, and marked to show they were not to be uncoupled in regular service. This was done to speed up the conversion process. The wagons were then later fully auto-coupled, and relettered to L. All 50 had been completed by the mid-1950s.

It would probably be possible to find out which wagons were paired by looking at workshop records, but this has as yet not been attempted.

By 1960, there were only 1,260 wagons on the register.

=== LL 4-wheel wagons ===
There were three wagons in this rather unusual class. Their description on records implies that they were either used half-and-half for livestock and general goods, or they were used for the latter and occasionally the former, hopefully being washed out afterwards!

LL 1 was built in October 1886. It was converted to replace the scrapped L7 sheep van in 1891 and renumbered to L7. It was scrapped in 1904. LL 2 was built in March 1889. It was converted to replace the scrapped L8 sheep van in 1891 and renumbered to L8. It was placed "off register" in 1907.

However, LL 3 had a completely different history. It was built in New South Wales in September 1889. The wagon was scrapped in 1891, when its classmates were converted to regular L wagons.

But in 1896, the underframe was used to build the replacement K5 flat truck. In this reincarnation it was fitted with water tanks. Thirteen years later it was placed 'off Register'. In its third life, in 1910, it became K 112, a Crane Truck. In 1911 the original K 112 was found running, and so the duplicate ex K 5 was returned to that number, which it kept. It was scrapped in 1927, but was not found in the 1925 stocktake.

=== LL, LF, LP, VSAY bogie wagons ===
As with the MM wagons, extra capacity was needed for sheep transport in 1928. Wagons LL1 to LL50 were constructed, resembling two L wagons joined and placed on bogies. Each wagon was capable of holding 50 sheep per compartment for a total of 200. The wagons were also unusual in that they had two waybill clips, so that one half of the wagn could be used by one owner, and the other half for another person's sheep.

In the late 1960s, ten wagons were classed LP and placed on passenger bogies, while the remainder became the LF series and had freight bogies fitted.

The LP's had a maximum speed 10 mph (16 km/h) higher than the LF's; 70 mph (110 km/h). They also had tail discs and side lamp brackets, making them suitable for trailing a passenger train. The vans were converted from LL 16, 28, 45, 27, 44, 12, 15, 6, 8 and 50 respectively. They were used between Mildura and Ouyen.

By 1974, traffic requirements changed, and the LP class was converted to LF, resuming their old LL numbers.

In the 1979 recoding, the LF class were relettered to VSAY. By then, 12 of the wagons had been scrapped. The remainder were removed from service in the 1980s.

== Horse wagons ==
=== Fixed wheel vehicles ===
From 1854 to 1914, horse transport wagons were constructed as required. Their codes all started with F, but the designs varied over the years.

The wagons were originally four-wheeled with curved ends (probably for storage). The 1890s design featured six wheels, with the number of stalls doubled from three to six.

In 1894, a new four-wheel van, F52, entered service with a greater capacity than other vehicles in the class. This van was recoded to F^{F} between 1894 and 1897.

The curved end wagons were all scrapped by the 1880s. The smaller capacity wagons were mostly rebuilt to a larger capacity between 1905 and 1910. They were then joined by the FF class, with the entire series being lettered F. This was made possible by the scrapping of the smaller capacity wagons. However, records between 1904 and 1914 are vague, and so it cannot be known which numbers had what done to them and when.

The traffic had mostly evaporated by the 1940s, so the remaining horse wagons were altered to OH and HD vans for general maintenance.

=== Bogie vehicles ===
In 1889, the first of six bogie horse wagons entered service, classed FF. Between 1894 and 1897, a larger four-wheel F wagon (F52) was relettered to F^{F}, and so the bogie vehicles were relettered to F^{FF}. This was reversed in the 1910 recodings.

Ten more bogie vans were built in the late 1920s, numbers 7 through 16.

In the mid-1950s, most of the class was altered in some way or another. FF's 1 and 8 were scrapped, while FF's 2-6 were modified for overhead construction on the Traralgon line and became OH 1–5. The underframes of FF 9 and FF 11 became Q 130 and 131 respectively, in 1953. The former was used as the crane jib support for Crane 45 and FF's 7, 10, 12 and 13, which had received upgraded bogies fitted during the 1940s, were reclassed FP in 1956.

By 1975, FP 7 was the only wagon in service, but two underframes were stored. In the 1979 recoding, FP7 became VSPY 7. By the mid-1990s the wagon was moved to storage at Newport.

In 1961, the three remaining FF bogie horseboxes, 14, 15 and 16, were recoded to FH. All three wagons had their bodies scrapped in 1962/1963, but the underframe of FH 16 was rebuilt as HW1, the body supplied by two HW vans. The two van bodies were joined to become a bogie vehicle.

=== Guard's Van with horsebox, later Carey ===
45D^{D}, later 43C, later Carey
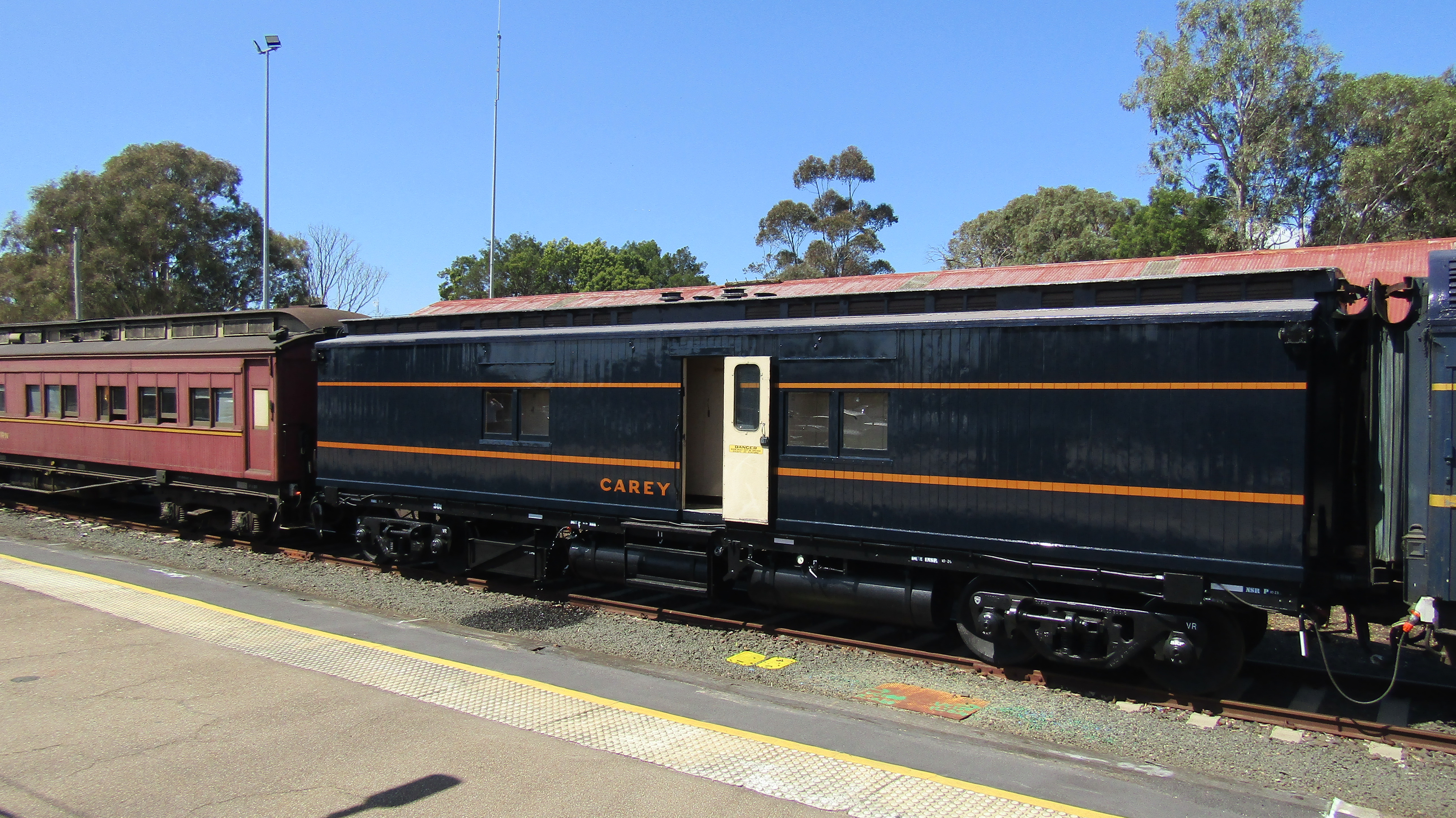
- Carey as preserved by Steamrail Victoria
- Manufacturer: Victorian Railways
- Built at: Newport Workshops
- Constructed: 1901
- Refurbished: 1963
- Number built: 1
- Number preserved: 1
- Fleet numbers: 1
- Capacity: 4 passengers, 8 shower cubicles
- Operator: Victorian Railways

Specifications
- Car body construction: 45 ft 0 in (13.72 m)
- Car length: 47 ft 8 in (14.53 m)
- Width: 8 ft 6 in (2.59 m)
- Height: 13 ft 2 in (4.01 m)
- Weight: 29.05 long tons (29.52 t)
- Bogies: 32 ft 10 in (10.01 m) between bogie centres, 6 ft 3 in (1.91 m) between axle centres
- Coupling system: Screw
- Track gauge: 5 ft 3 in (1,600 mm)

In 1901, a guard's van was built with a horse stall. It was numbered as DF^{DF}1, and was built with money allocated to replace van D69, which had been destroyed at Fairfield.

In 1905, the van was modified and expanded to three horse stalls, intended for use on the Warburton Line.

In 1906, it was renumbered to 45D^{D}, then to 43C in 1910. In 1956, the van was given a new incarnation as the second Carey, a shower vehicle. This was to replace the original Carey, which was wrecked at Seymour a few months earlier.

In the new form, the car had two 2-person seats, one at either end; then working towards the centre, there was a toilet and four shower cubicles either side of the central water heater compartment. Half the car was marked for Ladies, the other for Men. The car was immediately painted in blue with yellow stripes to match the steel passenger fleet; in 1984 it was repainted to red for the refurbished Train of Knowledge, and after entering formal preservation with the Seymour Railway Heritage Centre, the car was repainted again into a facsimile of the original Victorian Railways passenger livery, of dark red with yellow dots. In 2014, Carey was re-allocated to Steamrail Victoria and ran its first tour with the group on October 6, 2023.

== Narrow Gauge ==
=== ^{N}MM Class ===
This class consisted of 15 vehicles, resembling the M cattle wagons though squashed and stretched to fit the narrower loading gauge while maintaining similar capacity to the broad gauge vehicles. Construction started in 1899, and the last vehicle entered service in 1917.

== Liveries ==
In general, livestock wagons have been painted in Victorian Railways Wagon Red livery. The L sheep wagons had creamy-white floors, and some horse transports were dark grey, but those are the only exceptions.

== Loading ==
For the purposes of computing goods train tare weight (as of 1974), the following values were utilised for each type of load, plus the weight of the wagons themselves:

- WT Water tank wagon, (9000 litre capacity) = 9 tonnes
- M, horses or cattle = 6 tonnes
- L, sheep or calves (one level), or any other wagon = 2 tonnes
- L, sheep or calves (both levels) = 5 tonnes
- L, pigs (one level), or any other wagon = 3 tonnes
- L, pigs (both levels) = 7 tonnes
- VSBY, horses or cattle = 11 tonnes
- VSAY, sheep or calves (one level) = 5 tonnes
- VSAY, sheep or calves (both levels) = 9 tonnes
- VSAY, pigs (one level) = 7 tonnes
- VSAY, pigs (both levels) = 13 tonnes
- Z guards van = 13 tonnes plus up to 5 tonnes of goods

In vehicles only partially loaded, horses and cattle were to be taken as 508 kg each, calves as 101 kg each, sheep as 38 kg each and pigs as 51 kg each.

Therefore, if a train was scheduled to convey, say, 20 M wagons loaded with cattle and 20 L wagons loaded on both levels with pigs, plus a Z guards van, the total weight of the train would be (9+6)*20+(7+10)*20+(13+5) = 618 tonnes. For reference, a B Class diesel-electric engine was nominally permitted to haul 1,625 tonnes on a relatively flat line, reduced to 610 tonnes when climbing a 1:40 gradient (for instance, on the South Gippsland line). Additionally, trains were restricted to no more than 75 vehicles, counting bogie wagons and guards vans as two each, both due to maximum load on the drawgear and crossing loop lengths.
