= Victorian Railways sleeping cars =

This article is intended as a catalogue of sleeping carriages used by the Victorian Railways and successors.

- O type carriages - V&SAR Intercolonial Express Carriages
- E type carriages - Victorian Railways E type carriage#Sleeping cars
- Long W type carriages - Victorian Railways Long W type carriage#Sleeping cars
- Southern Aurora carriages - New South Wales stainless steel carriage stock
- The Overland carriages - V&SAR Overland Carriages
- S type carriages - S type carriage#Sleeping cars
- Z type carriages - Z type carriage
