= V&SAR Intercolonial Express Carriages =

19th-century carriages on the Adelaide–Melbourne railway line

V&SAR Intercolonial Express Carriages were carriages on a new train called the Intercolonial Express running on Victorian Railways and South Australian Railways in 1887. The track of two railways met on Wednesday 19 January 1887. The Victorian Railways' Western Line to Dimboola, and the South Australian Railways' Wolseley line, met at Serviceton. Since both sides shared the broad gauge of 5'3", an agreement was made between the two railways allowing a pool of carriages, classed O, to be specifically allocated to interstate trains linking the capitals of Melbourne and Adelaide. The operating and maintenance cost of the new train would be funded by both railways, approximately 60% paid for by the Victorian Railways and 40% by the South Australian Railways.

A new fleet of carriages was built for the train and classed as the letter O. Four sleeping cars were imported from the United States and delivered in 1886 (as 1O-4O). They were joined by eight composite sitting cars (5O-12O) and a variety of guards and mail vans (13O-22O) built by both the Victorian and South Australian Railway's workshops, and all delivered for service in 1887.

As patronage grew, additional carriages were added to the fleet, replicating earlier designs for fleet interchangeability. Vans 23O and 24O were built in 1890 to the same design as 15O and 16O; sitting cars 25-28O matched 5O-12O and entered service between 1897 and 1891; and 29O and 30O matched the designs of the initial sleeping cars, 1O-4O.

The sitting cars became the most worn of the fleet, so in 1900 Victoria and South Australia each provided six sitting passenger carriages from their newest fleets, and the O cars 5-12 and 25-28 were removed from interstate service and split half each way, becoming the Victorian Railways' 77-82AB^{AB} and the South Australian Railways' no.233-238.

A new custom fleet was constructed from 1907, using the design of the E type carriage of the Victorian Railways. When that was completed the remaining O type carriages were withdrawn and split equally.

== Design ==
The O cars were generally built to the existing most up-to-date designs of the respective railways, aside from the custom-ordered sleeping carriages.

== Construction ==
Most of the O type carriages were built at either Newport or Islington workshops, to pre-agreed designs. The initial sleeping cars were imported complete, and the final pair were imported as kits and constructed locally.

== Operations ==
The initial fleet provided four sleeping cars, eight sitting cars, four guard's vans, three post office vans and three baggage/mail vans, so it is reasonable to assume that the typical Intercolonial Express consist would have included one sleeping, two sitting, one post office car, one baggage/mail car and one guard's van, providing one consist for each direction. A spare of each type would be rostered in maintenance, and the fourth sleeping, fourth guard's van and seventh and eighth sitting cars would be kept spare, available for swapping out of a consist on short notice. In the event of a post office or baggage/mail car being unavailable one from the standard VR or SAR fleet could be substituted as a temporary replacement.

After a few years of operation, two additional guard's vans, four sitting and two sleeping cars were added to the fleet. These would have allowed a consist of two sleeping, four sitting and four vans, including one acting as the guard's van. It is possible that one guard's van may have been placed at either end of the train, to provide some degree of noise insulation and simplify shunting movements at either end to and from the yards.

== Fleet Details ==
=== Mann cars ===
1-4, 29, 30O, Willochra, 117, Broughton, ViceRegal Car 3, Sleeper No.6, Avon, Mildura, Kiewa, Latrobe, Hindmarsh
- Constructed: 1886
- Scrapped: 1929-1932
- Capacity: 20 berths
- Operators: Victorian and South Australian Railways

Specifications
- Car body construction: Timber
- Car length: 61 ft 2 in (18.64 m) over body, 70 ft 8 1/2 in (21.55 m) over coupling points
- Width: 9 ft 8 in (2.95 m)
- Height: 13 ft 3 in (4.04 m)
- Weight: 35 LT 7 cwt 3 qtr (35.96 t)
- Bogies: 46 ft 0 in (14.02 m) apart

In 1886, delivery was taken of four sleeping carriages built by the Mann Boudoir Car Company of New York.

The first two, 1O and 2O, were delivered on 22 October 1886, and 3O and 4O entered service on 24 December of the same year. The cars had twenty berths attached to a corridor, with exposed end-platform diaphragms.

Additional cars 29O and 30O entered service on 30 October 1889, identical to their predecessors. It is possible that 29O was constructed at Newport Workshops, having been delivered as a kit of parts.

In 1907 the E type carriage sleepers were entering service and these sleepers were rendered obsolete, so the O fleet was split roughly equally between the two railways. In March 1908 the Mann Boudoir cars were reallocated; 1O and 4O went to the South Australian Railways; the pair were issued numbered 116 and 117 in the SAR fleet, while 2O and 3O became Sleeper No.6 and Mildura in the Victorian Railways' fleet. 29O and 30O were retained in Joint Stock service until further E type sleeping cars had been delivered, but they were allocated names Latrobe and Hindmarsh respectively.

==== South Australian Railways ====
Cars 116 and 117 entered SAR-exclusive service in 1908.

116 was fitted with electric lighting, and one end was altered to an observation car profile for departmental inspection tours, in 1909. It was renamed Willochra in 1910 and retained in that service until 1933 when it was officially condemned, though reports exist of it having been part of the 1934 Royal Tour Pilot Train. The car was sold to Rofe and Co in 1935.

117 was named Broughton in 1911, and altered like Willochra as an observation car in 1913 (presumably including fitting of electric lighting). In April 1930 it was converted to State (ViceRegal) Car No.1, and it was retained in that capacity until 1940 when it was withdrawn and sold to W.Brown and Sons Ltd. It ended its days as a house boat at Goolwa. Eventually it fell into disrepair and was broken up about 1974.

Hindmarsh was allocated to the SAR in 1920, and it is known that it was used on that railway's Renmark Express service during 1927-1929. The car was recorded as scrapped in 1933, but it had been used as part of the 1934 Royal Tour (Duke of Gloucester)'s Pilot Train between Tarlee and Adelaide. Carriage no. 118 had long-since been allocated to a different vehicle, so the car kept its name as the only identity.

It is thought that the vehicle was sold and moved to a property somewhere in the Two Wells - Virginia region.

==== Victorian Railways ====
By August 1908 Mildura had been rebuilt with fourteen berths removed and replaced with a kitchen and dining area, and renamed Kiewa. Sleeper No.6 followed in 1911 with the same conversions made, and it was named Avon. Externally the cars were still marked as first-class sleepers, with no reference to the kitchens.

Latrobe was given to the VR in 1920, but no records exist of any conversion away from the sleeping car configuration.

Kiewa and Latrobe were withdrawn in 1929, and Avon in 1932.

=== Mansard Roof Composite Sitting (5-12, 25-28O) ===
5-12O, 233-238, 77-82ABAB, 75-80AB, later conversions
- Constructed: 1887-1891
- Scrapped: 1936-1976
- Capacity: 32 1st, 20 2nd sitting (later 60 2nd for SAR)
- Operators: Victorian and South Australian Railways

Specifications
- Car body construction: Timber
- Car length: 39 ft 6 in (12.04 m) over body, 42 ft 10 1/2 in (13.07 m) over coupling points
- Width: 8 ft 6 in (2.59 m)
- Height: 12 ft 2 in (3.71 m)
- Weight: 18 LT 10 cwt 0 qtr (18.80 t)
- Bogies: 27 ft 6 in (8.38 m) apart

From 17 January 1887, a small fleet of composite 1st/2nd sitting carriages were built by the Victorian Railways' locomotive and carriage department, and allocated to the Intercolonial Express. Cars were given identities 5O through 12O, as numbers 1-4 had been taken by the Mann sleepers. The cars were of a side-loading type, 44ft1in long and with capacity for 32 1st and 20 2nd class passengers.

A later delivery added numbers 25-28 to the fleet, with these vehicles entering service over the course of 1889-1891. Again, all were built at Newport, with the exception of number 25 which had been constructed at the South Australian Railways' equivalent.

When the cars were superseded by the OA/OB fleet in 1900, half the cars (6-8, 10, 11, 25) went to the South Australian Railways as numbers 233-238, and the rest (5, 9, 12, 28, 26, 27) went to the Victorian Railways as cars 77-82 ABAB.

==== South Australian Railways ====
The South Australian carriages were converted in 1929 to sit 60 2nd class passengers, and most were scrapped in 1938 (233 in 1936; 238 in 1953).

==== Victorian Railways ====
The Victorian carriages were renumbered again in the 1910 recoding, to occupy the range 75-80AB.

In the 1950s 75-77AB were converted to temporary Way and Works crew sleeper cars; 75 and 77AB were scrapped in 1956 with bodies last seen in Alberton, Victoria in that year, but they were both gone by 1995 when the area was developed for housing. 76AB was formally converted to workmen's sleeper 77WW in 1959, and retained in service until 1976 when it was stored at Newport Workshops; it was then marked Off Register at some point in 1977.

78, 79 and 80AB were extended in 1911-13 with frame splicing to bring the total length to 57' 3" over body. 78AB then remained in service until conversion to 57WW in 1958, and withdrawal in 1978. 79AB became 108B, then with electrification it was converted to Swing-door (dogbox) trailer carriage 100BT. In 1923 it was altered to 126T, and it was scrapped with that identity in 1964. 80AB became 32BC with a guard compartment, then 9BCD in 1921 and 22D in 1924. It was marked scrapped in 1962.

=== Mansard Roof Centre Cupola Guard's Vans (13O, 14O) ===
13O, 14O
- Constructed: 1887
- Scrapped: 1983
- Capacity: 16 tons
- Operators: Victorian and South Australian Railways

Specifications
- Car body construction: Timber
- Car length: 39 ft 6 in (12.04 m) over body, 43 ft 3 1/2 in (13.20 m) over coupling points
- Width: 8 ft 3 in (2.51 m)
- Height: 12 ft 7 3/4 in (3.85 m)
- Weight: 16 LT 15 cwt 0 qtr (17.02 t)
- Bogies: 27 ft 7 in (8.41 m)

Two composite passenger and guard/brakevans were built by Newport Workshops and dedicated to the Intercolonial Express in 1887. They were allocated the identities 13O and 14O.

The vans comprised a long goods and passenger compartment, with a guard's raised observation cupola in the centre. The guard had both a handbrake and a direct connection to the Westinghouse Air Brake pipe for the whole train.

In 1908 they were removed from Joint Stock service. 13O went to the VR as 46DD, while 14O became No.7 with the SAR.

==== South Australian Railways ====
Not much detail is available on the post-Joint Stock life of brake van 7.

==== Victorian Railways ====
The VR accepted 13O onto their books in 1908, and allocated it the new identity 46DD. In the 1910 recoding that was changed to 44C.

It was fitted with high-speed bogies of the TT30 type in 1958 at Newport Workshops, and retained in service until withdrawn in 1983. The body was sold to the Sunraysia Area Scouts at Lake Cullulleraine near Mildura, and it was last spotted by Bruce McLean at Lake Cullulleraine in 1991.

=== Mansard Roof End Cupola Guard's Vans (15O, 16O, 23O, 24O) ===
15, 16, 23, 24O
- Constructed: 1887
- Scrapped: 1938-1953
- Capacity: 15 LT 0 cwt 0 qtr (15.24 t)
- Operators: Victorian and South Australian Railways

Specifications
- Car body construction: 32 ft 1 in (9.78 m)
- Car length: 35 ft 4 1/2 in (10.78 m)
- Width: 8 ft 3 in (2.51 m)
- Height: 23 ft 7 3/4 in (7.21 m)
- Weight: 15 LT 1 cwt 1 qtr (15.30 t)
- Bogies: 20 ft 0 in (6.10 m) apart

A further four composite passenger and guard/brakevans were constructed by the South Australian Railways for use on the Intercolonial Express; 15O and 16O in 1887, and 23O, 24O in 1890.

These vans comprised a long goods and passenger compartment, with a guard's raised observation cupola at one end. The guard had both a handbrake and a direct connection to the Westinghouse Air Brake pipe for the whole train.

In 1895 the vans were marked as modified with a fish compartment; this would likely have been a small, iced, locked compartment under the floorboards of part of the van between the bogies.

In 1908 they were removed from Joint Stock service. 23O and 24O became No.58 and 68 with the SAR, while the other two became the VR's 47 and 48DD.

==== South Australian Railways ====
Not much detail is available on the post-Joint Stock lives of brake van 58. However, it is known that No.58 was later converted to a weighbridge wagon (fixed at a certain weight for calibration purposes).

Van 68, on the other hand, was modified in 1919 with the guard compartment shifted to the centre of the van, requiring removal of the fish compartment. In 1930 the van was altered for use as a railcar trailer, and in 1941 the fish compartment was restored. Finally, in 1953, the van was condemned.

==== Victorian Railways ====
The VR accepted 15O and 16O onto their books in 1908, and allocated them new identities 47–48DD. In the 1910 recoding they were given new identities 45C and 46C respectively.

45C was withdrawn in 1954, and 46C was withdrawn in 1938.

=== Mansard Roof Mail Vans (17-22O) ===
17-22O, EES3, 258, 259
- Operators: Victorian and South Australian Railways

Specifications
- Car body construction: 12 ft 1 in (3.68 m)
- Car length: 35 ft 4 1/2 in (10.78 m)
- Width: 7 ft 10 in (2.39 m)
- Weight: 13 LT 15 cwt 2 qtr (14.00 t)
- Bogies: 5 ft 10 in (1.78 m) between axles, 20 ft 0 in (6.10 m) apart

In the days before electronic communication, hand-written letters were the only method of long-distance communication. As a result, there were massive amounts of mail traffic on a daily basis between the South Australian and Victorian capital cities, from which the mail would be distributed all around the states.

To meet this demand, the South Australian Railways built six mail-sorting vans for use on the Intercolonial Express, all entering service in 1887 with identities 17O through 22O.

The vans were staffed with post office employees, who loaded mail bags at the start of the trip (and at intermediate stops) and spent the entire travel time sorting letters for delivery en route and at the terminus.

Unlike all the other classes from the O series, the divide was uneven in 1908 with two - 18 and 19O - sent to South Australia as numbers 258 and 259; the other four were all given to the Victorian Railways. 17O became the VR's 3EES, retaining its mail-sorting facilities.

The remaining three vans, 20O, 21O and 22O, had their SAR ownership share purchased by the VR in 1904, and they were withdrawn from Joint Stock service and rebuilt as WS workmen vans 9, 10 and 11.

==== South Australian Railways ====
18 and 19O were sent to the South Australian Railways in 1908 and allocated numbers 258 and 259.

In 1916, 258 was modified to become the Officers Inspection Car, Murray. In 1934 the name was changed to Willochra, after the first (ex No.1O) was withdrawn. In 1966 the van was condemned and sold to Mr Nicholls of Jabuk, who eventually sold it to Old Tailem Bend Town Historic village. It was moved to Port Dock Station Railway Museum in 1991.

259 was spotted in use as a locomotive crew sleeping van in 1918, and it was withdrawn from service around 1936.

==== Victorian Railways ====
17O became 3EES in 1908 then 3DS in 1910, following the recoding of the then-new E type carriages. In 1922 it was rebuilt as a workmen's sleeper no. 4WW, and in 1938 it was scrapped.

20O, 21O and 22O became Victorian Railways property in 1904, and they were rebuilt as WS vans 9, 10 and 11. This group of workmen's sleepers was supposed to be restricted to four-wheel wagons, so in 1910 they were recoded 1-3WW.

1WW was scrapped in 1931; 2WW in 1934 and 3WW in 1929.

=== 1900 fleet boost - 31-42 OA, OB ===
By 1900, some of the original O-type carriages were no longer the best of either railways' fleet, so both the Victorian and South Australian Railways volunteered six carriages each from their regular fleet, as temporary members of the O series.

All cars were returned to their original identities and allocations in late 1908.

==== Joint-Stock V type carriages (31-36 OA & OB) ====
The vehicles provided by the VR were 1898-1900 built V type carriages 21A^{V}, 26A^{V}, 23B^{V}, 5A^{V}, 11A^{V} and 6B^{V}, taking numbers 31-36 and codes OA for first class and OB for second. However, there is no evidence that the new codes were marked externally.

==== Joint-Stock SAR carriages (37-39OA, 40-42OB) ====
The vehicles provided by the SAR had been built at the Islington workshops. 181, 182 and 183 were built in 1892 as 44ft1in side-loading coaches with accommodation for 48 1st class passengers, and they became 37-39OA. 192, 193 and 196 were from an 1899 batch, with room for 54 2nd class passengers. Only the latter three had internal toilet compartments.

=== Introduction of E type carriages ===
The first E type carriages ran in late 1906 on the Melbourne-Albury run, but by 1908 enough had been constructed to boost, and later replace, the entire Joint Stock fleet then running between Melbourne and Adelaide.

By 1910, 24 cars had been delivered into Joint Stock service - six each 1st (AE) and 2nd (BE) class sitting cars four Sleeping cars named Melbourne, Ballaarat, Wolseley and Adelaide (later renamed), four CE guard vans, and two each mail storage (EEB) and mail sorting (EES) vans. The SAR built 9 of the cars plus one underframe at Islington Workshops to cover 40% of the construction cost (as agreed between the SAR and VR commissioners), though the body of this tenth car was constructed at Newport.

Details of further deliveries of E type carriages can be found on that page.
