= Ballarat Heritage Weekend =

Community festival in Victoria, Australia

Coordinates: 37°33′43.59″S 143°51′22.14″E

- Genre: Festival
- Dates: Mother's Day weekend, 7-8 May
- Frequency: annual
- Location: Ballarat
- Years active: 20
- Inaugurated: 2006
- Attendance: 14,500 (2012)
- Organiser: City of Ballarat
- Website: http://www.ballaratheritageweekend.com/

Ballarat Heritage Weekend is a community cultural festival held annually in Ballarat, Victoria, Australia. Run since 2006 by the City of Ballarat, it is a major tourist attraction. The festival follows a heritage theme drawing on Ballarat's reputation as a historic Australian city. Many of the events are free.

Popular recurring events include public access to selected buildings similar to Doors Open Days; vintage transport, including visits to the historic Ballarat railway station by Steamrail Victoria locomotives (Y112), vintage bus rides, double decker buses, vintage car displays, horse and cart and use of Ballarat's preserved vintage tramway at the Ballarat Botanical Gardens; actors in period garb; architecture and history walking tours; and exhibits of private and public paraphernalia collections; theatrical performance; and trade displays for heritage organisations.

The Ballarat Mining Exchange (1887−9) is regularly used as an exhibition space.

== History ==
Attendance
2008	4,000
2009	6,000
2010	8,000
2011	9,500
2012	14,500

The first festival was held in May 2006. The 2010 event featured swimsuits and accessories by Louis Vuitton. In 2011, an exhibit of Ballarat inventor Henry Sutton was shown. The 2012 event was themed "Childhood Memories" and featured a retro fashion catwalk and screening of retro film trailers. However the event was marred by vandalism of Steamrail Victoria's trains, however the City of Ballarat pledged to contribute to the cleanup so that the train could return.

The 2013 program included an exhibit featuring cars used in the filming of The Doctor Blake Mysteries, a 1960s themed dance event, historic mayoral portraits and a private collection of retro games. and an LP and rare records market.

A virtual weekend was held in 2020 on grounds of COVID-19 pandemic.
