= Victorian Railways V class (diesel-hydraulic) =

Class of Australian diesel-hydraulic locomotive

Victorian Railways V Class
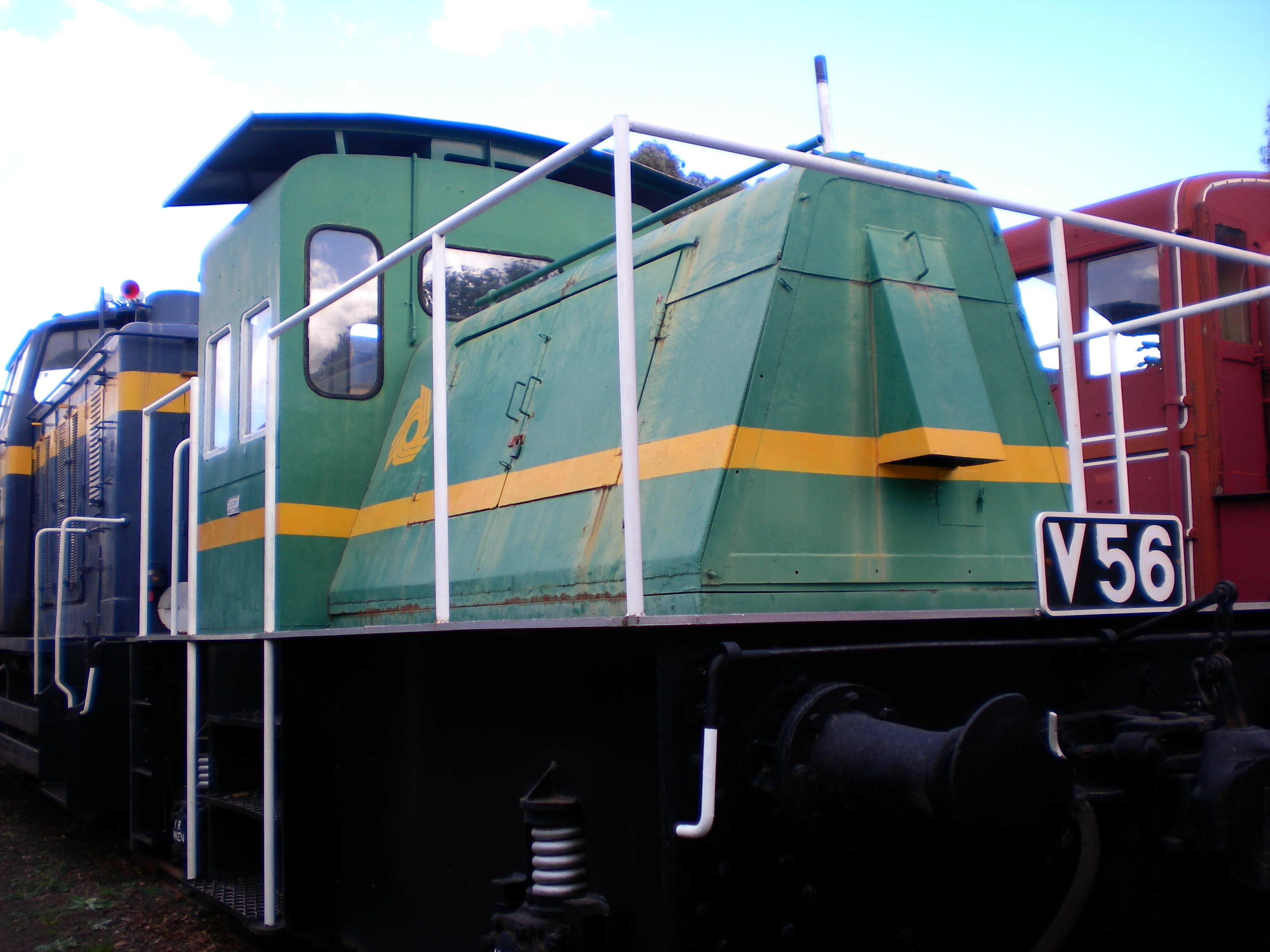
Type and origin
- Power type: Diesel hydraulic
- Builder: Newport Workshops
Specifications
- Configuration
  - Whyte: 0-4-0
- Gauge: 1,600 mm (5 ft 3 in)
- Length: 6.32 m (20 ft 9 in)
- Loco weight: 22.00 t (21.65 long tons; 24.25 short tons)
- Prime mover: FORDSON MAJOR
Performance figures
- Maximum speed: 16 km/h (9.9 mph)
- Power output: 30 kW (40 hp)
Career
- Number in class: 1
- Numbers: V56
- First run: 1959

The Victorian Railways V class is a one-off diesel hydraulic locomotive that consisted of only V56. It was built as the shunter for the Jolimont Workshops to move the suburban sets through the washdocks. It was originally unclassed, being classified as a "Power Shunter", but was subsequently designated as V56 and thus became the final locomotive built at Newport Workshops. The number "56" followed on from the C and X class steam locomotives' sequence, C1-C26 then X27-X55, and it is only a coincidence that its number, general shape and function align with the Rail Tractors which eventually reached RT54. V56 entered service after RT18 and before RT19. The builder's plate shows a date of 1959, but the engine entered service on 20 January 1960.

While the washdocks did have an overhead contact wire fitted, for safety this was usually isolated and only provided to prevent pantographs from getting tangled if the wires had terminated either end of the wash dock track.

The engine was capable of operating at fixed speeds up to 10 mph (16 km/h), but wash-dock shunting was usually only done at 1 mph (1.6 km/h). Other moves were made at 3 - 5 km/h. The speed limit of 16 km/h did not pose a problem in operation. Two-position light signals were provided along the relevant track, the red aspect labelled "Stop" and the green aspect "Go" on the faces of the lenses. V56 would usually pull 7-car trains sets through the wash, but it did occasionally push instead. When not in use the engine was stabled in the wash shed.

The locomotive features a 40 hp Fordson tractor engine which drove four hydraulic motors. It was the smallest locomotive owned by the VR and later the Metropolitan Transit Authority.

Buffers and autocouplers were fitted to allow it to couple up to screw coupled stock (Swing Door trains or Tait trains) or Knuckle coupled stock (Harris trains, Hitachi trains). For coupling to the Comeng trains, a conversion coupler was required. This attached to the Comeng 'multi function' coupler and converted it to a temporary knuckle coupling.

The locomotive was originally painted in a bright red with a black under frame, before receiving the Victorian Railways' blue and gold paint scheme in early 1974; during this time it was replaced by RT46 at Jolimont. It was sighted being towed back to Newport Workshops for repairs in August 1976.

By 4 September 1986 it was repainted into Metropolitan Transit Authority green and gold livery. The engine was stored at Newport Workshops as at November 1990 and later observed in storage at North Melbourne It has retained the green livery through preservation at the Newport Railway Museum.

== Locomotives ==
Locomotive	Entered service	Withdrawn	Owner	Status
V56	20 Jan 1960	c. 1990	Newport Railway Museum	Preserved – Static

== Preservation ==
V56 was retired with the closure of Jolimont Workshops. During the late 1990s, V56 was used at the Steamrail Depot, Newport for small shunting moves. Currently V56 is on static display at Newport Railway Museum.
