= Newport Workshops =

Railway workshops in Melbourne, Victoria, Australia

Coordinates: 37.8516°S 144.8819°E

Newport Workshops (Garden Platform)
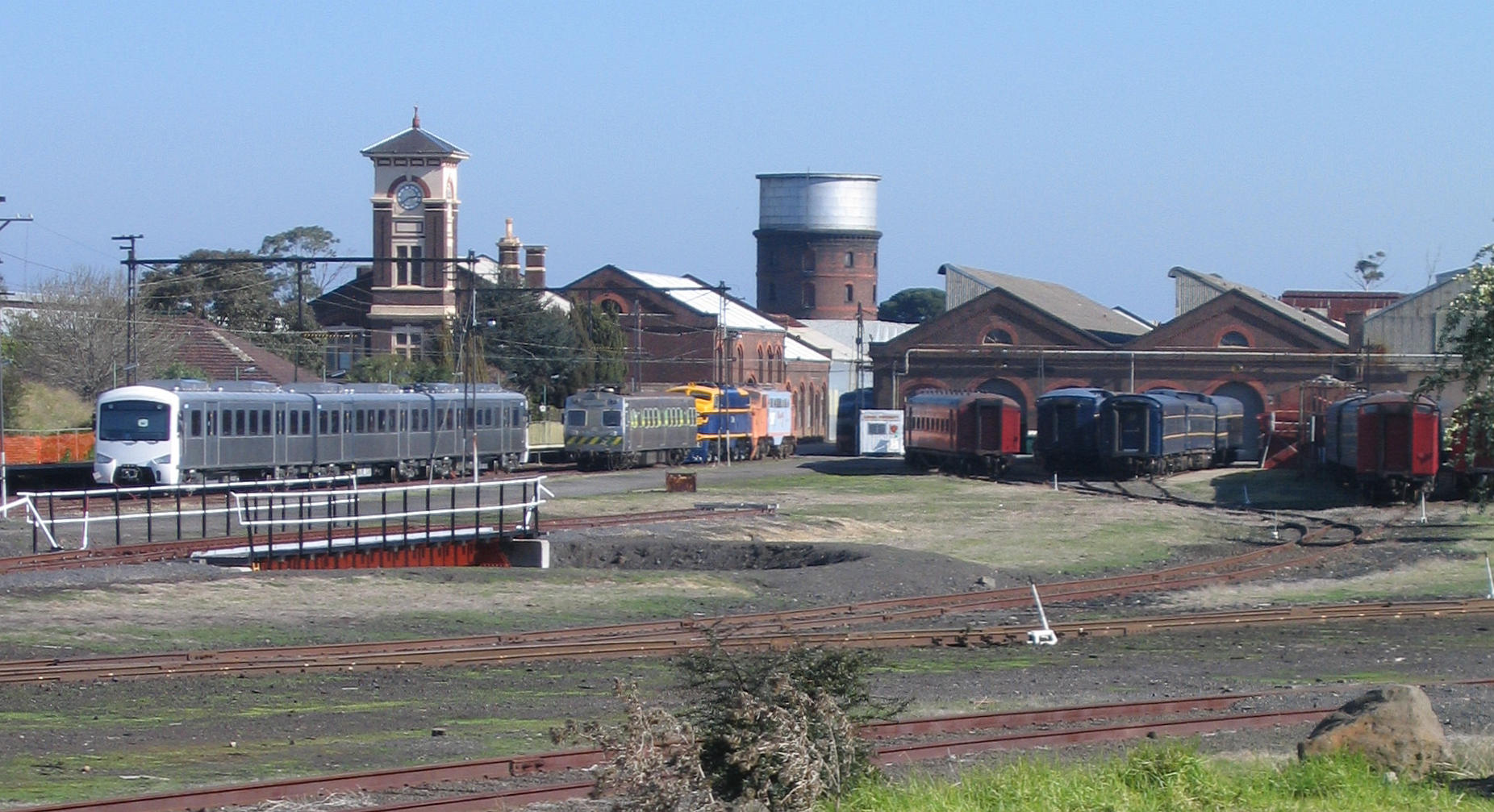
- West Block section of the workshops. The administration block and clock tower are to the left and the Steamrail Victoria depot is to the right, August 2005.

General information
- Location: Newport, Victoria 3015
- System: Railway Workshops Platform
- Owner: VicTrack
- Manager: Metro Trains Melbourne
- Line: Williamstown
- Distance: 11 kilometres from Southern Cross
- Platforms: 1 side
- Tracks: 3
- Train operators: Metro Trains Melbourne, Steamrail Victoria

Construction
- Structure type: At-grade
- Accessible: No

Other information
- Status: Special use only
- Station code: NWS

History
- Rebuilt: 2024
- Electrified: 1919 - 1500 V DC overhead
Location

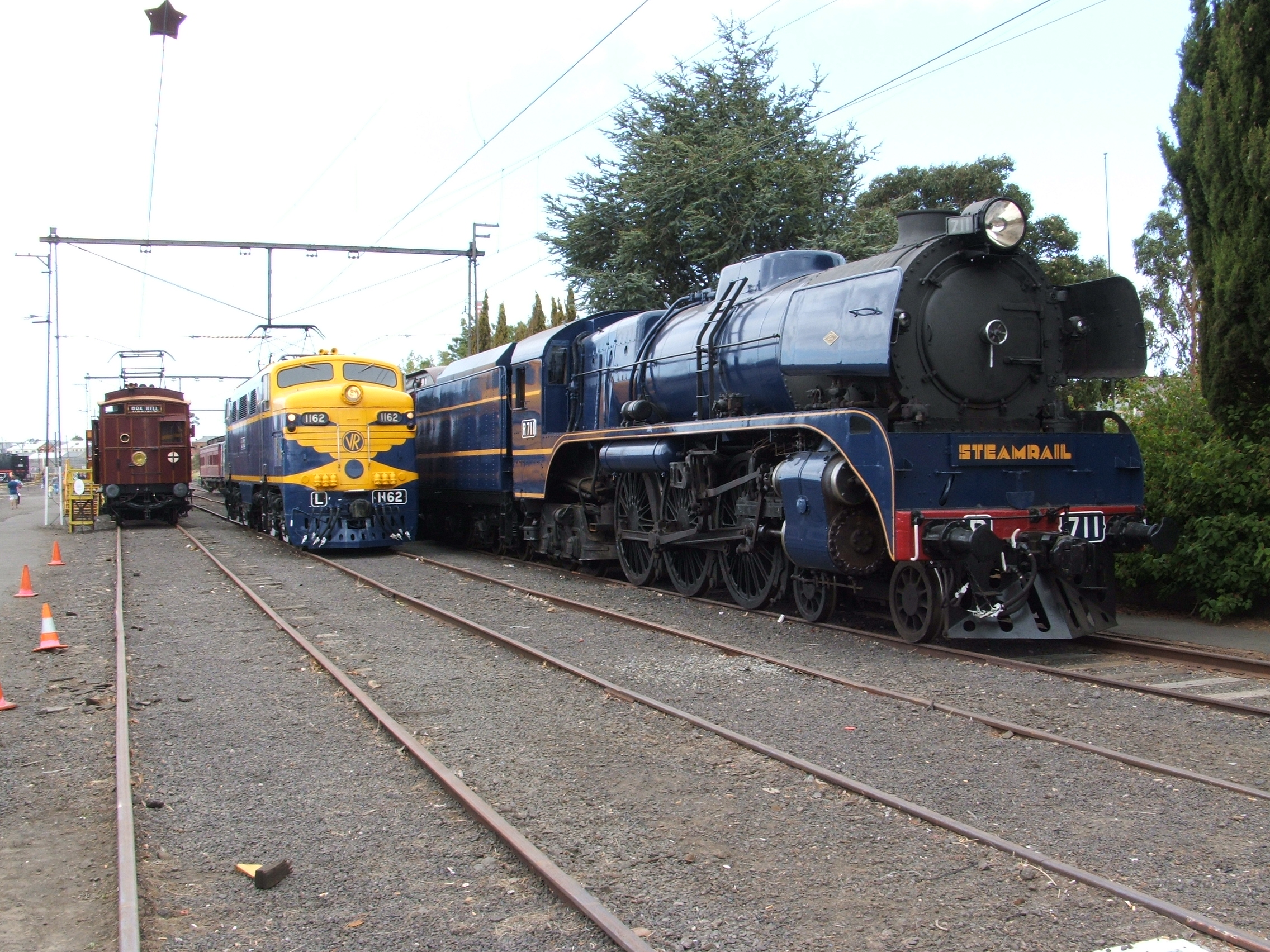
Victorian Railways R class locomotive R 711, on display at the Steamrail Victoria Open Days alongside preserved Victorian Railways L class electric locomotive and Swing Door suburban train, 12 March 2007.

The Newport Railway Workshops is a facility in the Melbourne suburb of Newport, Australia, that builds, maintains and refurbishes railway rollingstock. It is located between the Williamstown and Werribee railway lines.

== History ==
Plans for a workshop at Newport started in the 1860s, to replace the temporary Williamstown Workshops but nothing came of it. It was not until 1880 that work began, when the Victorian Railways purchased annexes used at the 1880 Melbourne Exhibition and erected one of them at Newport, naming it the Newport Carriage Workshops when it began operation in 1882.

Construction of the permanent workshops commenced in 1884, and was completed in 1889. Although the earlier carriage workshop closed at this time, it reopened in 1895 to manufacture signal equipment. The first carriages built by the workshops were completed in 1889, but early locomotives were manufactured by external contractors such as the Phoenix Foundry in Ballarat. The first locomotive built in house at Newport was Z Class 0-6-0T No.526 'Polly 'in 1893. The final locomotive built at the workshops was initially diesel-hydraulic M Class M232 in 1959, though later V56, which entered service in 1960, was retroactively considered a locomotive.

The main elements of the 1889 workshops are a central stores block and clock tower with offices, the 'East Block' for carriage and wagon works, and 'West Block' for heavy engineering and locomotive building. Expansion followed in 1905–1915, and 1925–1930. During World War II the workshops were turned over to military production, with the rear fuselage, and empennage of Bristol Beaufort bombers being built there.

At the peak of operation it was one of Victoria's largest and best-equipped engineering establishments, with up to 5,000 employees on site. The workshops had its own cricket ground, and in the 1920s the game of Trugo is said to have been invented by workers on their lunch hour. In the late 1980s, the original segments of the workshops were removed from everyday use, with operations continuing at the 1930s complex along the eastern side of the site.

In 1985 the V/Line foundry was renovated, at a cost of A$2,800,000, making up for thirty years of underinvestment. Two new automatic pillar furnaces, capable of producing 26 tonnes (26 long tons; 29 short tons) of molten metal per day, were installed at a cost of A$520,000 each, while additional moulding equipment was brought in for A$1,600,000 primarily to produce cast brake blocks.

On 15 January 2000, operation of the workshops and ownership of assets passed from the Public Transport Corporation to Evans Deakin Industries (EDI, formerly Clyde Engineering). In March 2001 EDI was taken over by Downer Group to form Downer EDI Rail. Until May 2024, revenue operations were carried out in the eastern section of the workshops by Downer Rail, who carried out work including locomotive and carriage maintenance, and diesel engine, bogie and wheelset overhauls; for customers including Pacific National and V/Line. From 2018 - 2024, High Capacity Metro Trains (HCMT) were constructed at Newport by Evolution Rail in part of the former Boiler Shop. The last HCMT to be constructed was Set 70, which departed for Pakenham East Depot on 2 April 2024.

== Tenants ==
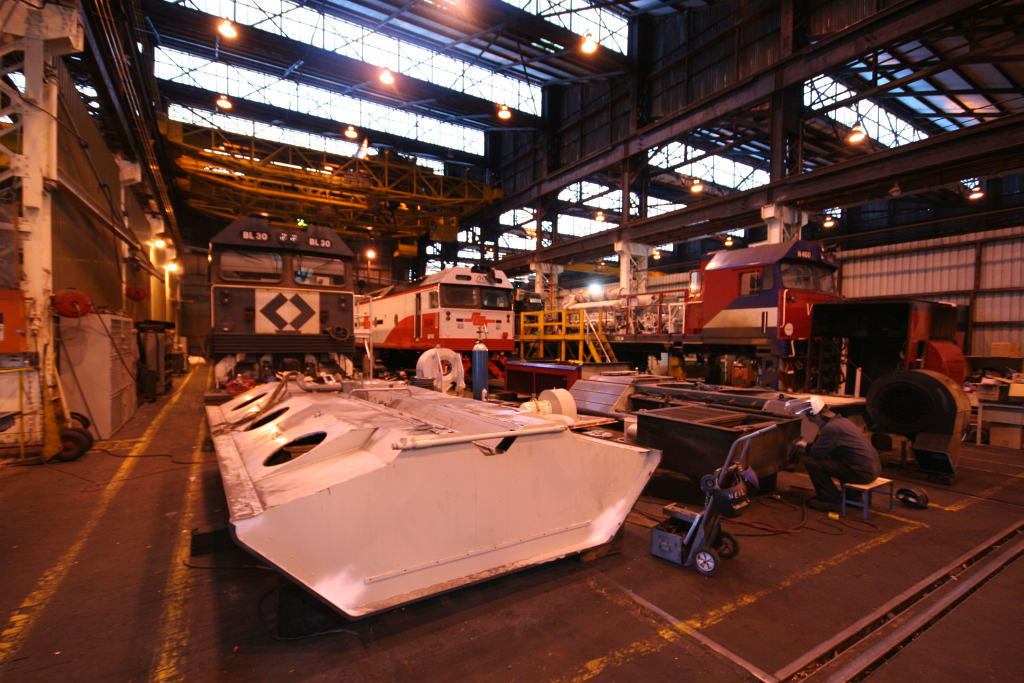
In the Downer Rail section, BL, G, and N class diesel locomotives are undergoing overhauls in August 2007

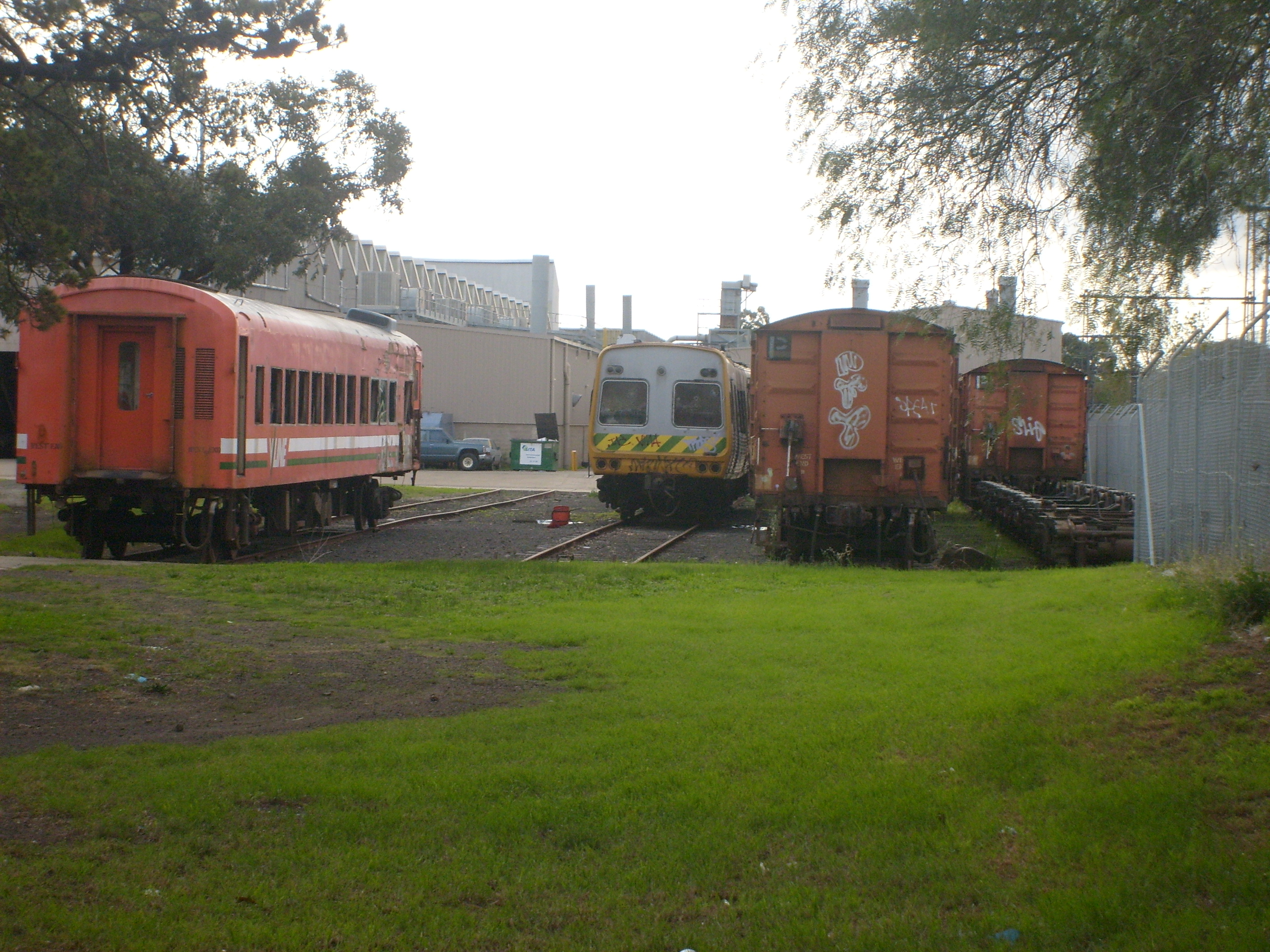
South end of Newport Workshops, Downer Rail section in June 2008

Since Downer Vacated the site in 2024, V/Line has taken over tenancy of the site for rollingstock storage and to contract the operation of the broad gauge underfloor wheel lathe, one of 3 in Victoria (the others being at Metro Trains Melbourne's Craigieburn and Pakenham East Depots) to Alstom. Most of the former Boiler Shop is leased to Metro Trains Melbourne for maintenance of their Siemens Nexas trains.

The original 1880s workshops have been maintained for heritage uses. The 'West Block' area are occupied by a number of railway preservation groups such as Steamrail Victoria, Diesel Electric Rail Motor Preservation Association Victoria and 707 Operations, while the 'East Block' has been retained by VicTrack for the storage of disused trams, buses, military vehicles and rail rollingstock. The 'Centre Block' and 'East Block Extension' are occupied by the Fire Services Museum of Victoria workshop.

The Newport Railway Museum is located south of the operating workshops, near North Williamstown railway station.

In 2009, the surrounds of the former Tarp Shop to the west of the site were developed into train stabling for Metro Trains Melbourne, and are also occupied by Rail Academy Newport.

== Gallery ==
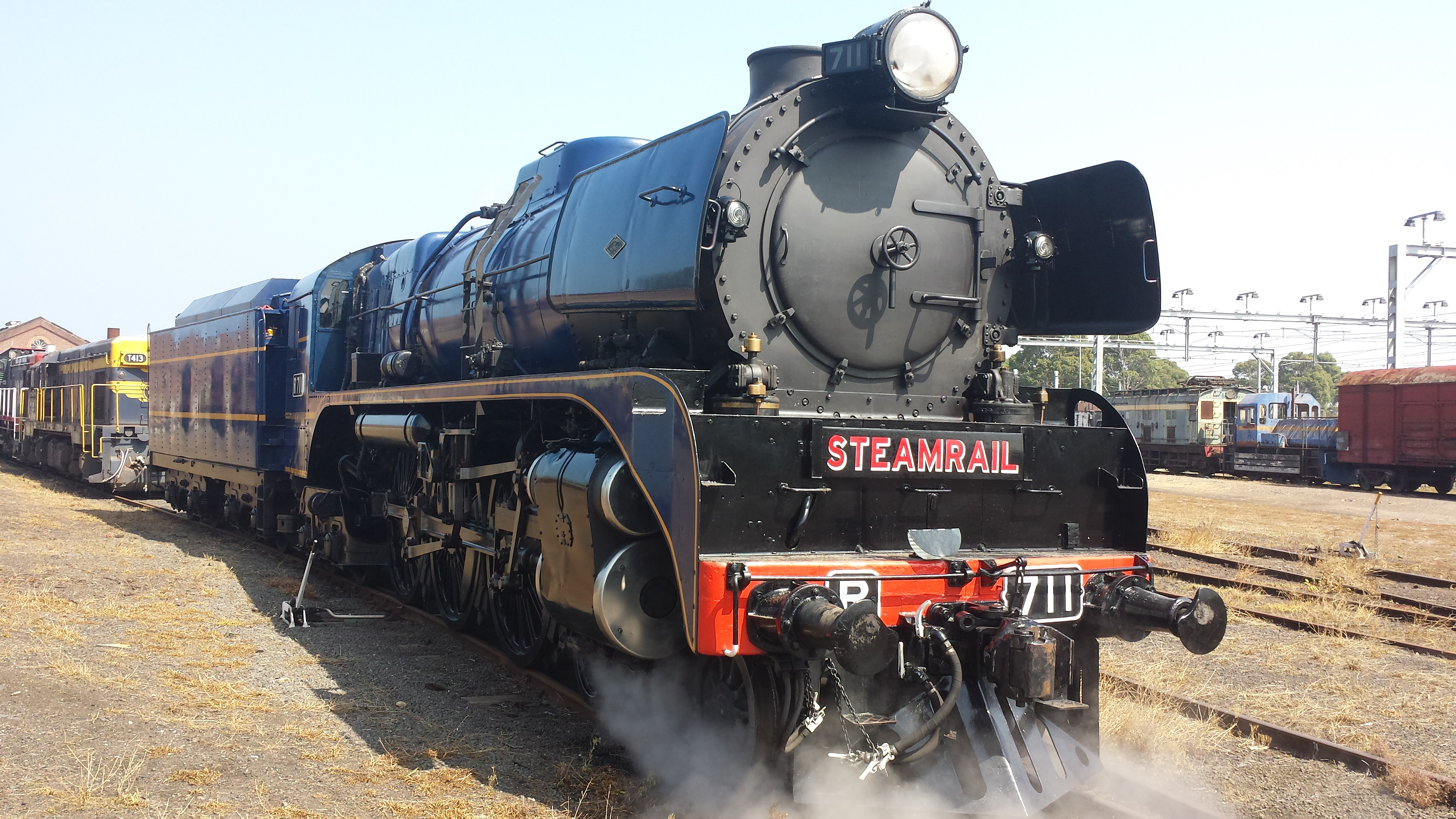
R711 at Newport on Steamrail Victoria.

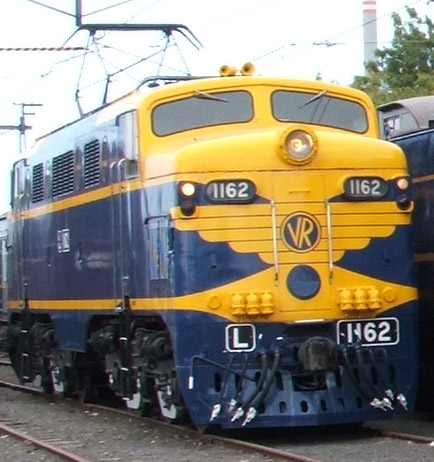

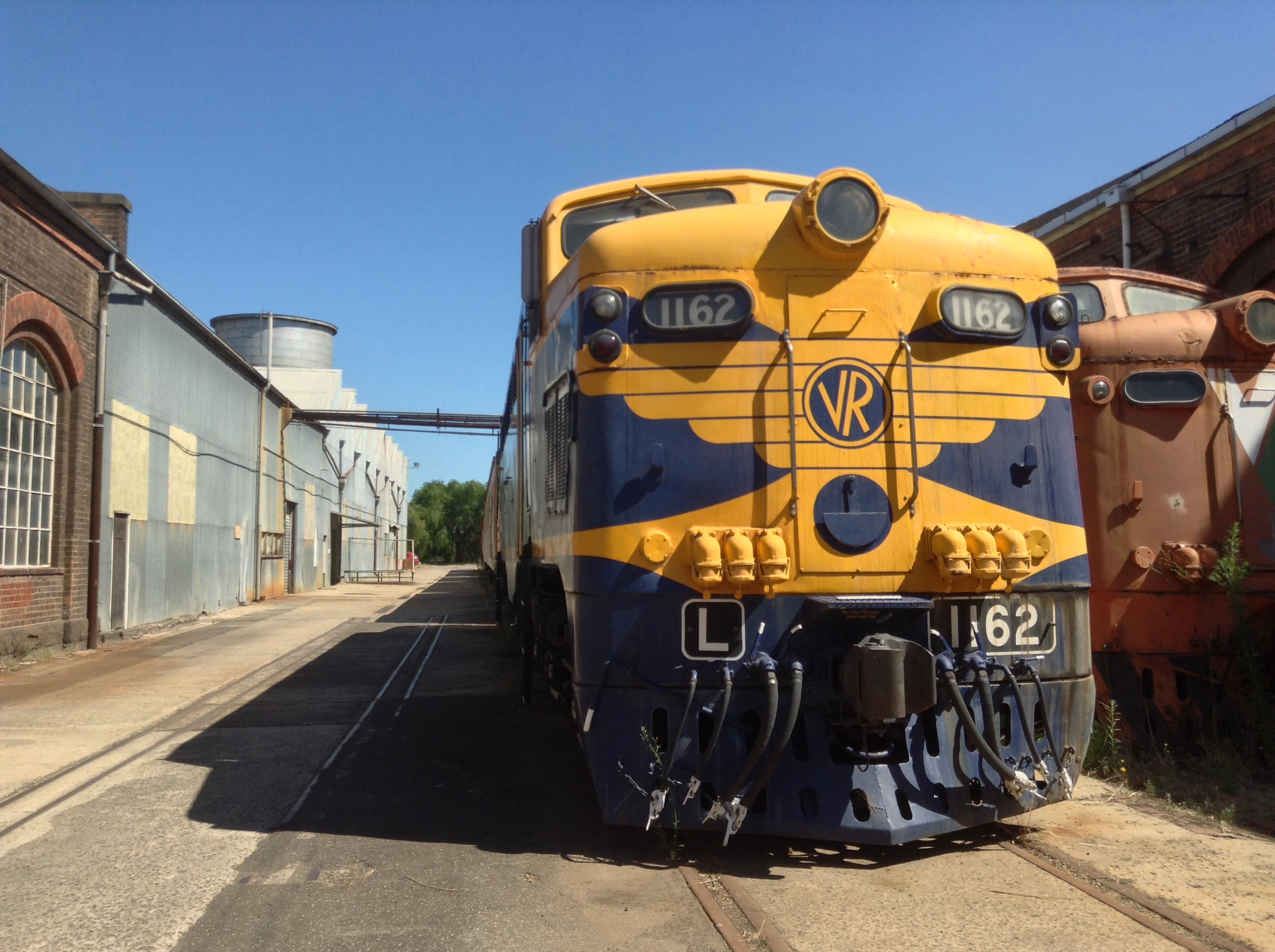

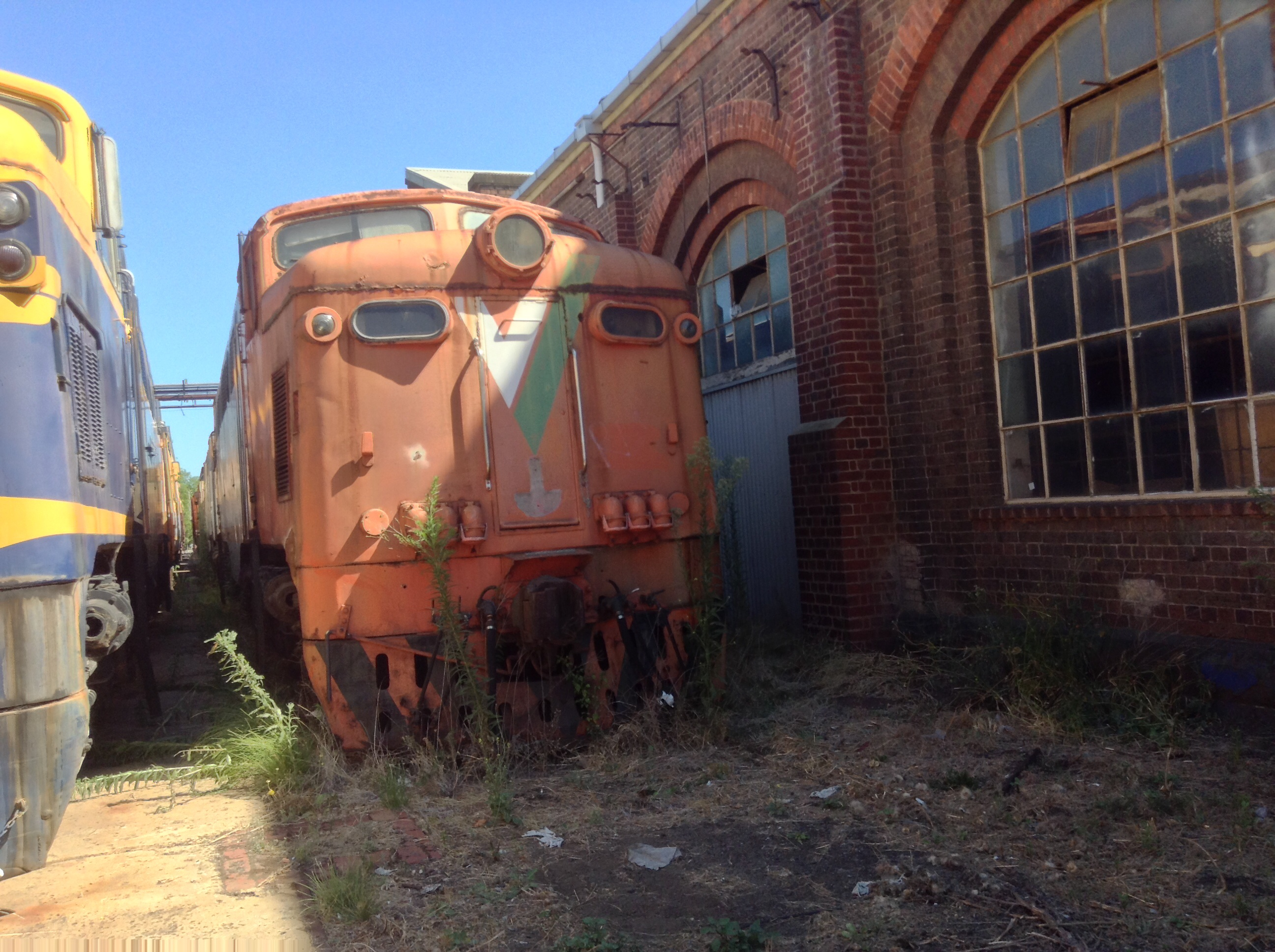

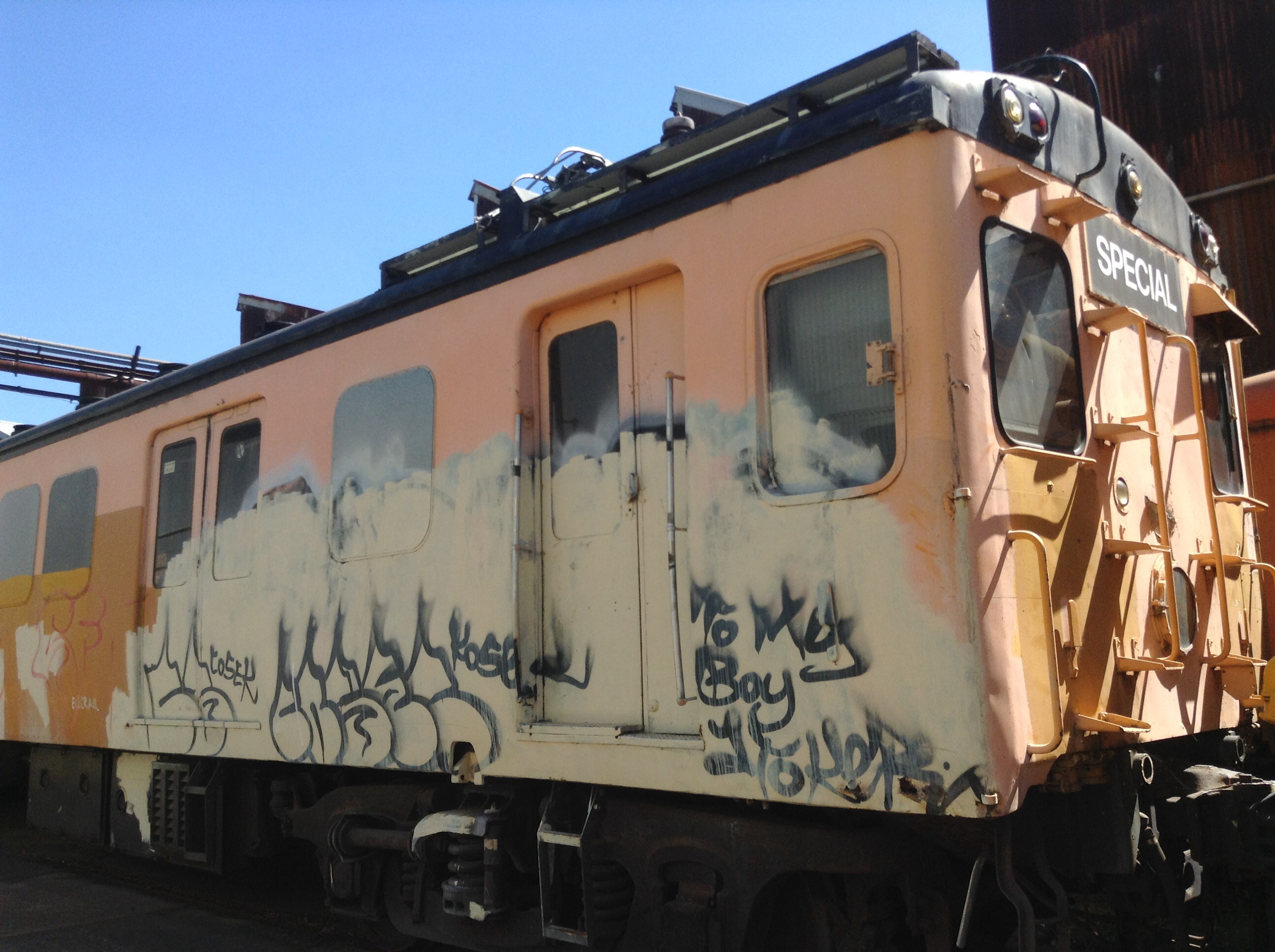

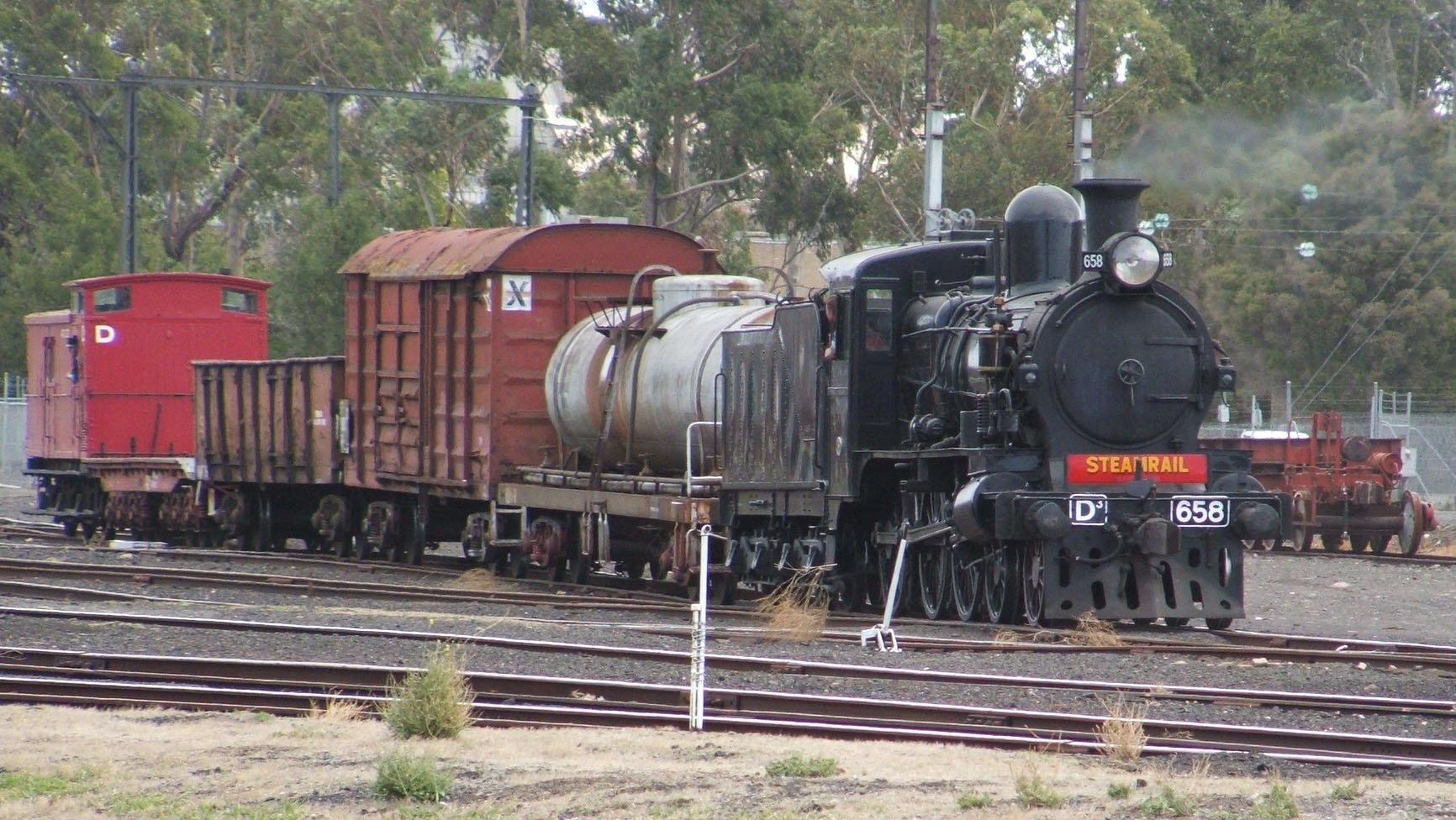
D3 658 (D3 639) at Newport In 2007.

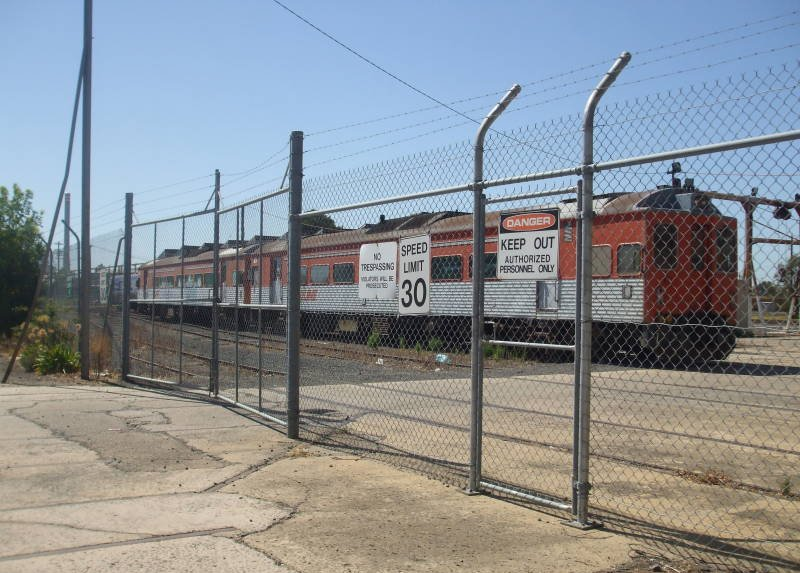

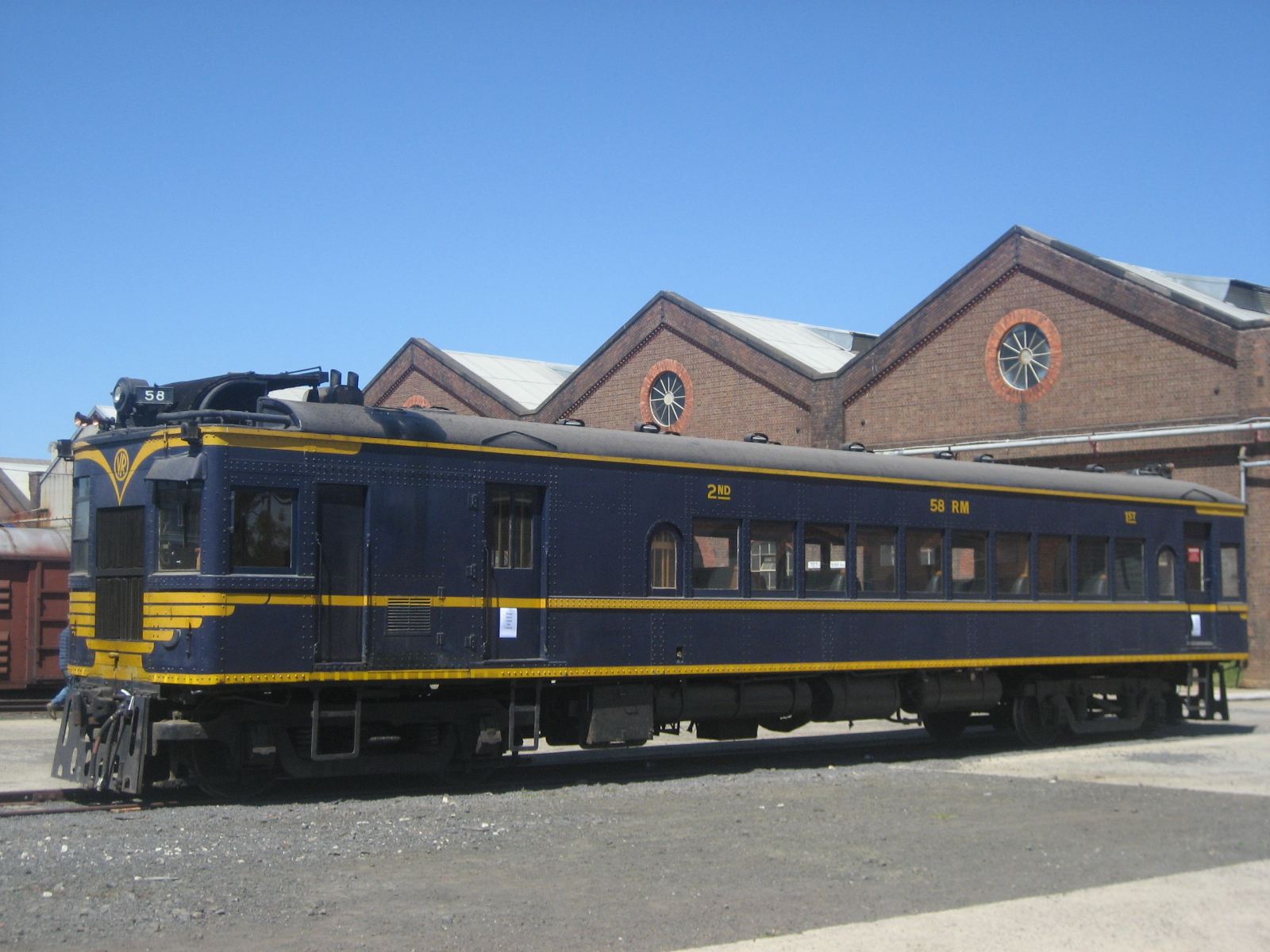

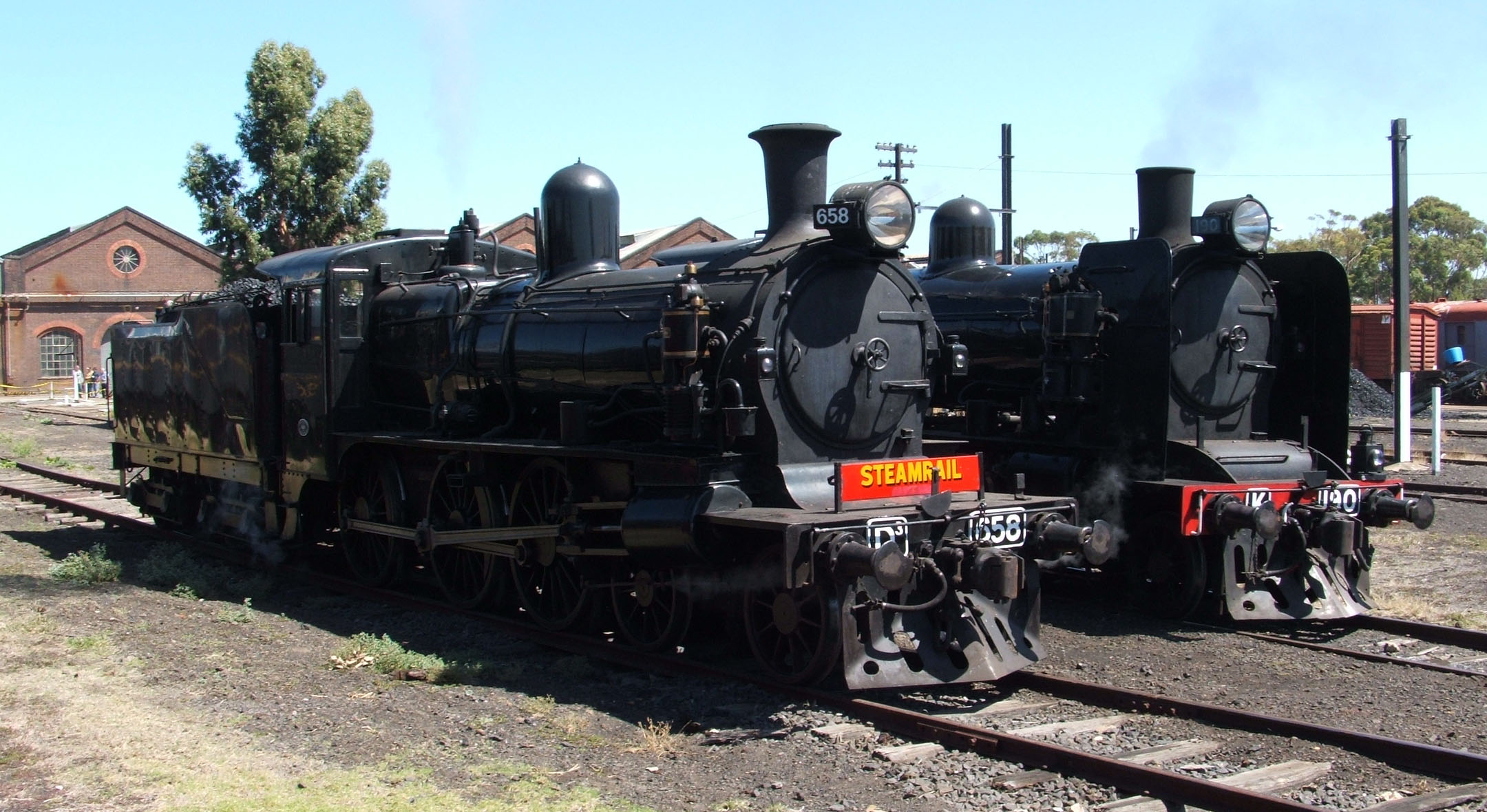
D3 658 (D3 639) and K190.

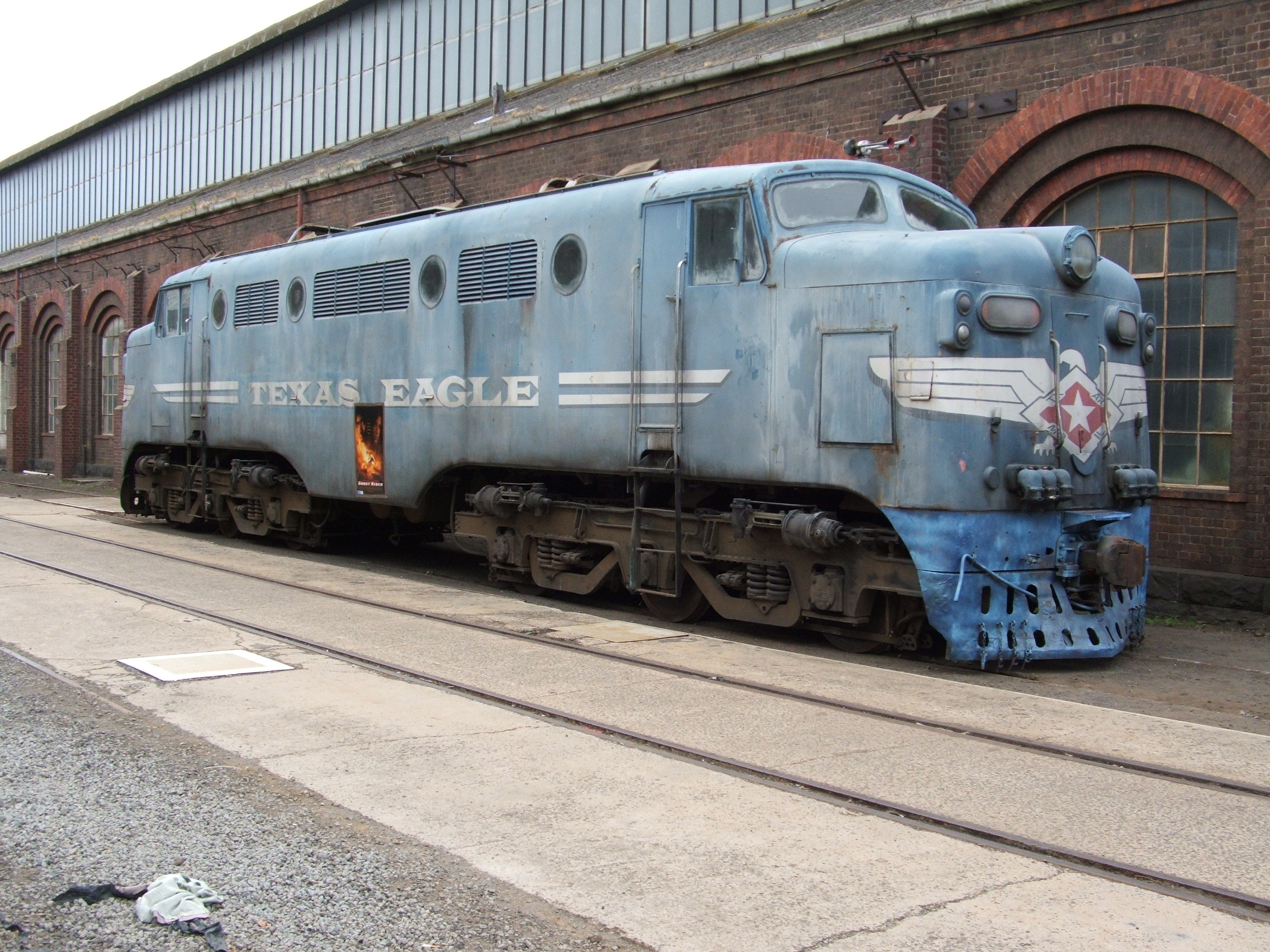

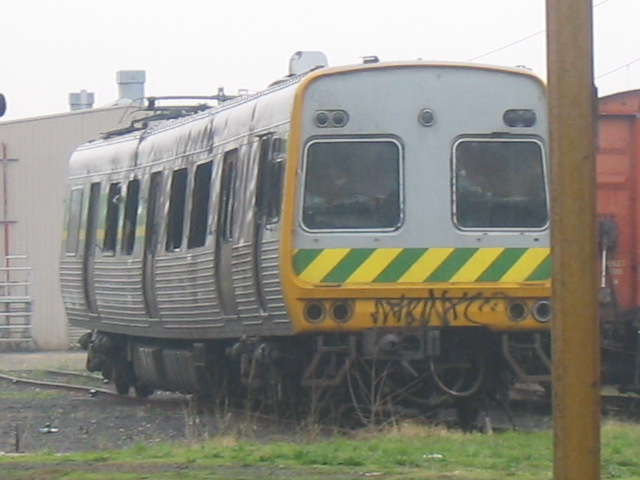

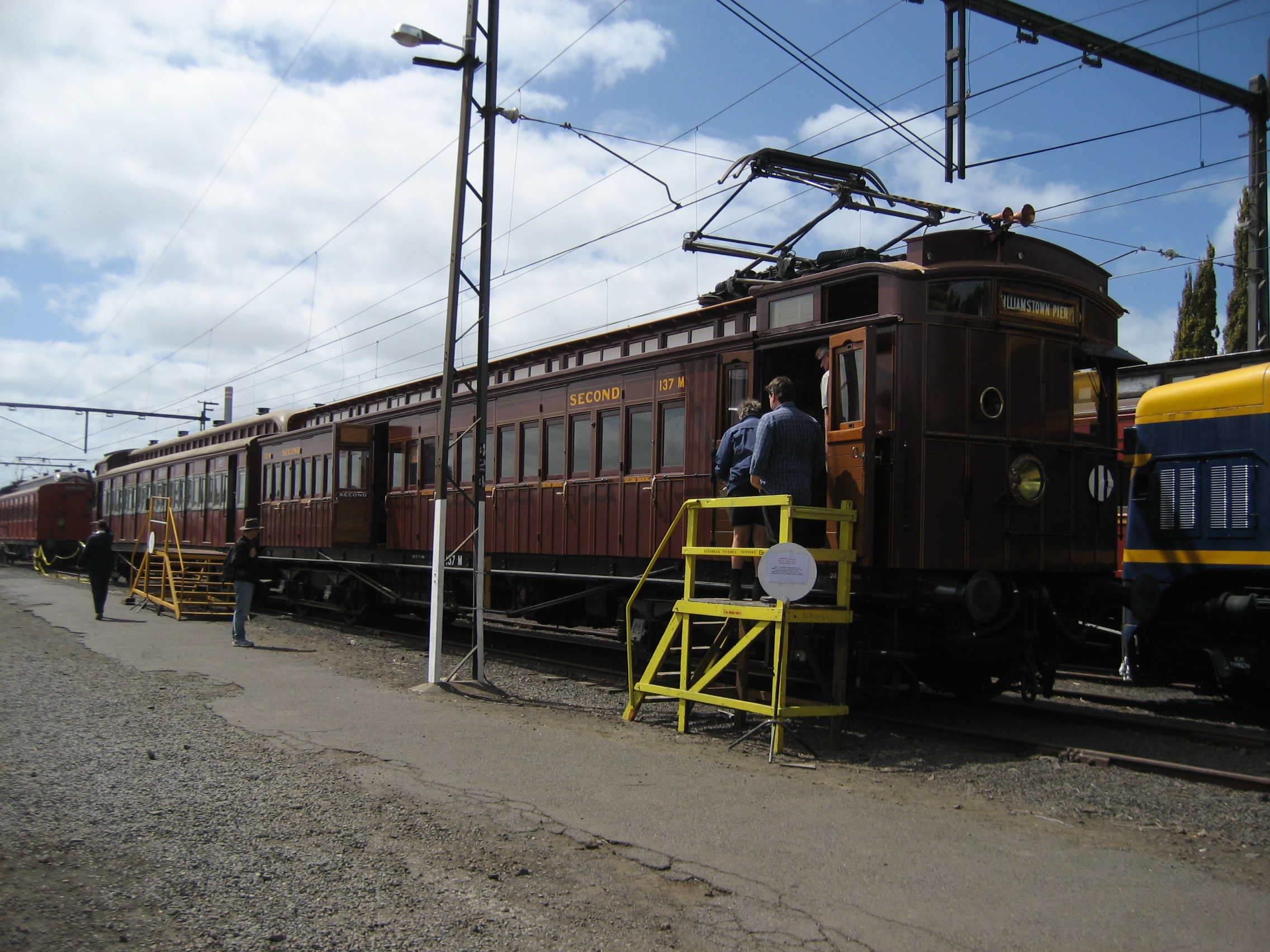

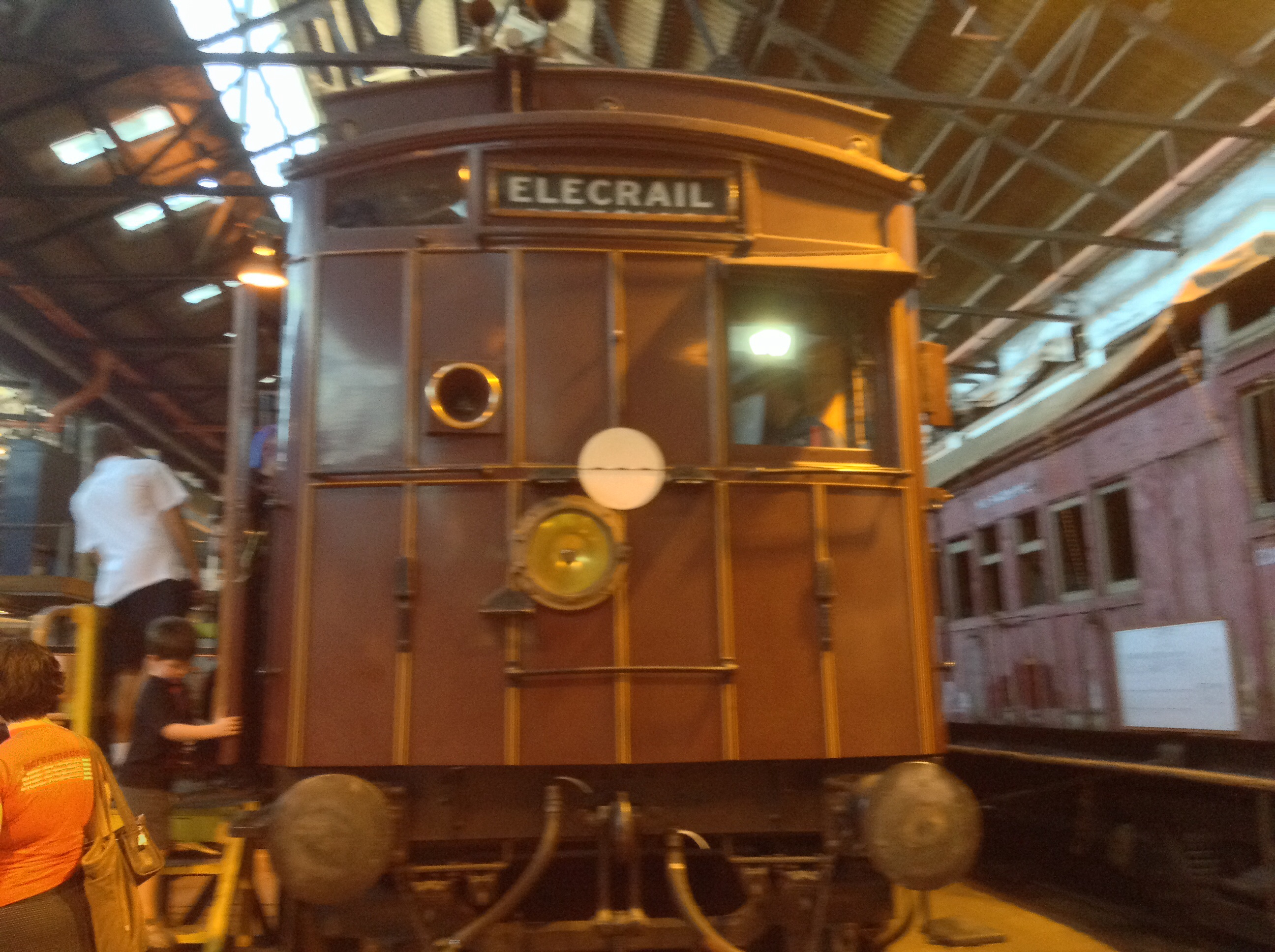

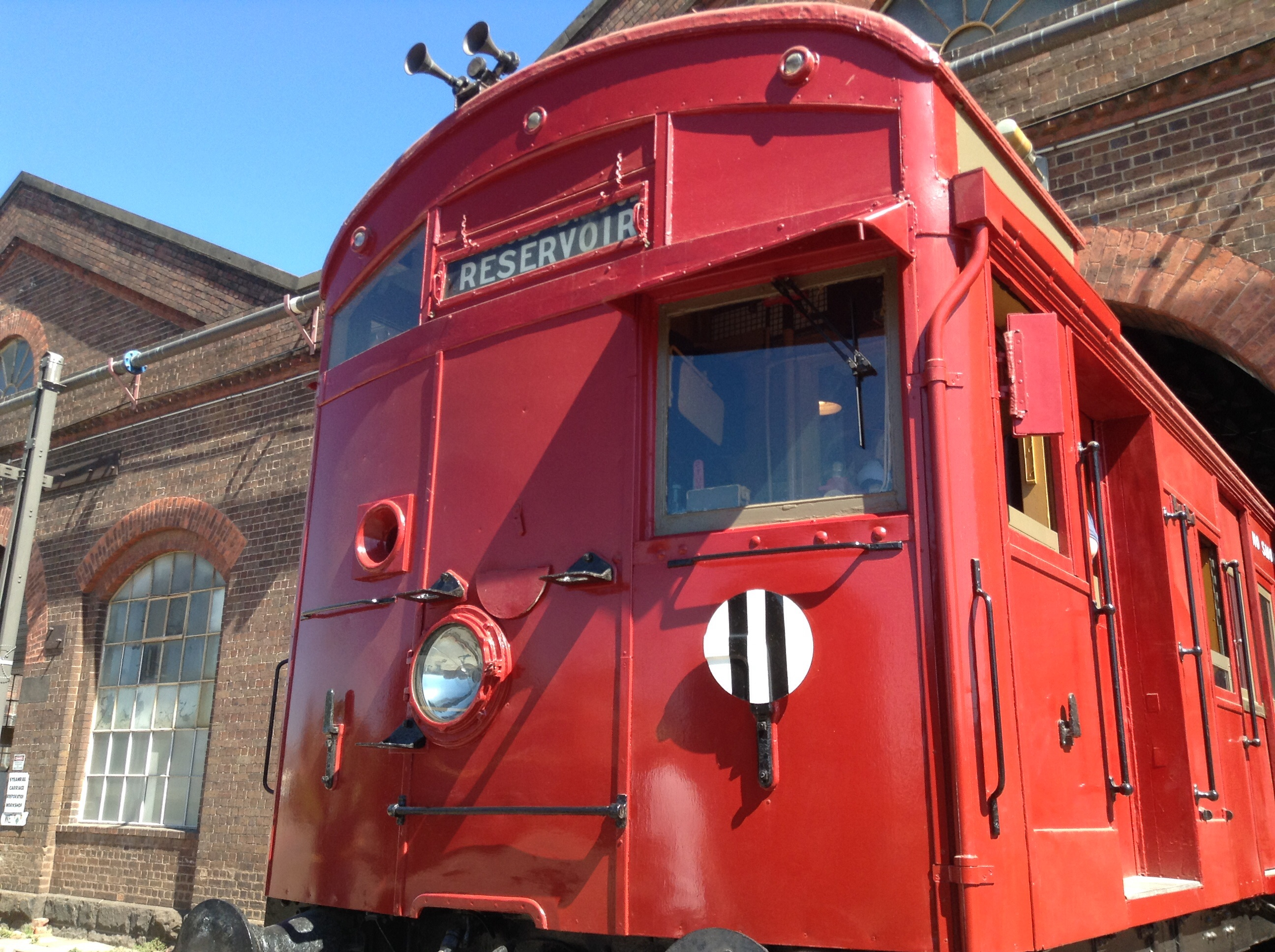

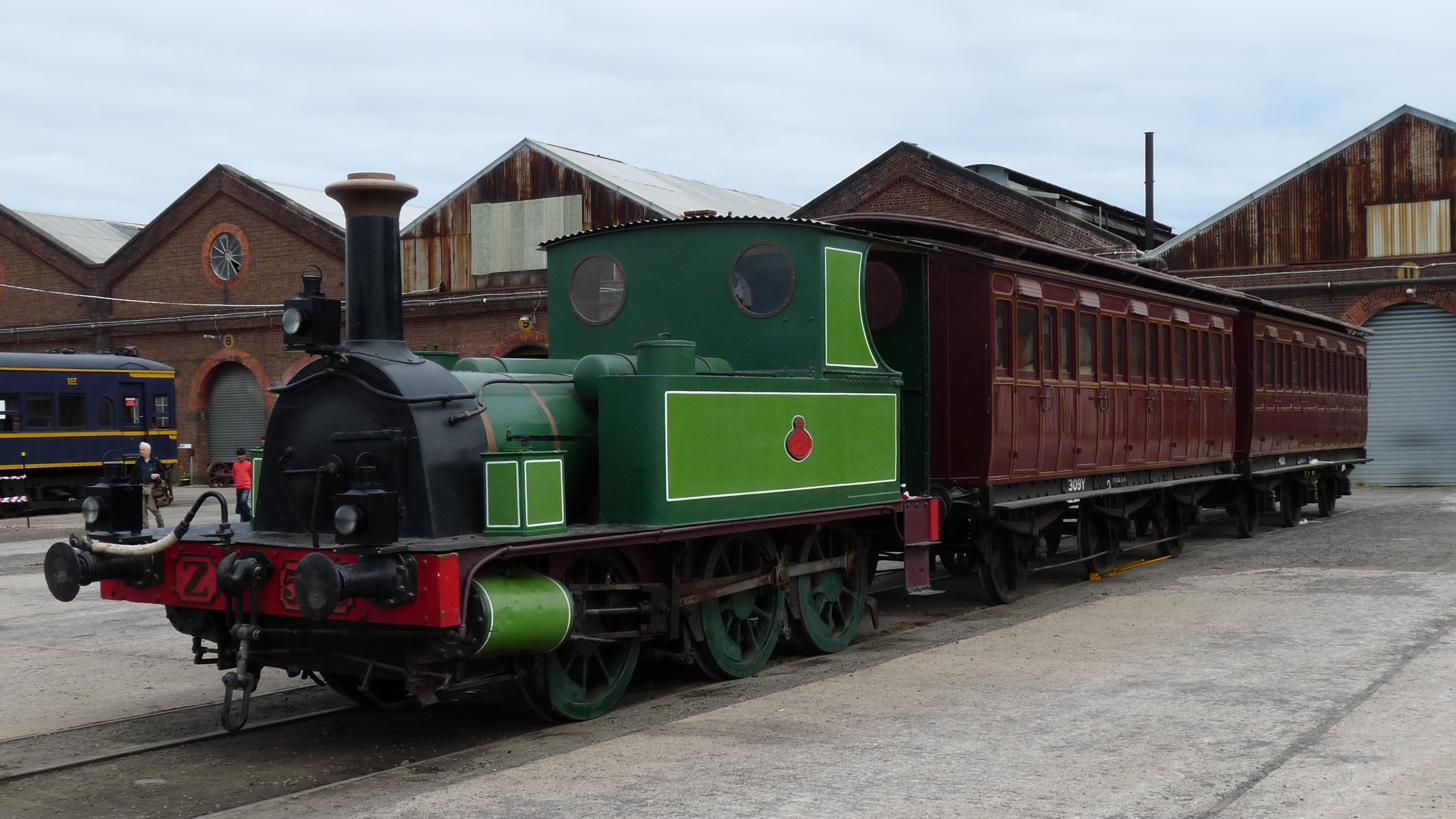

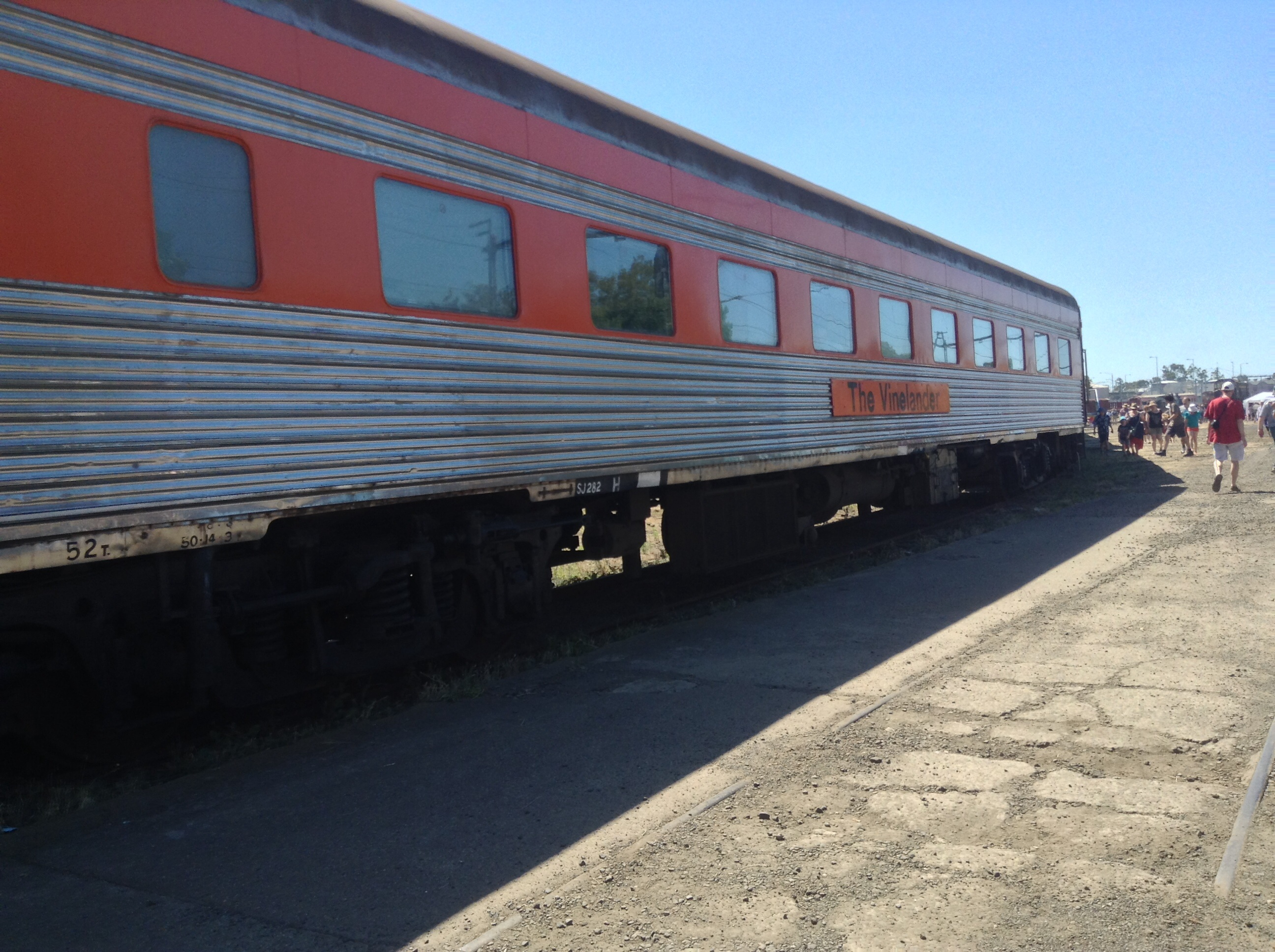

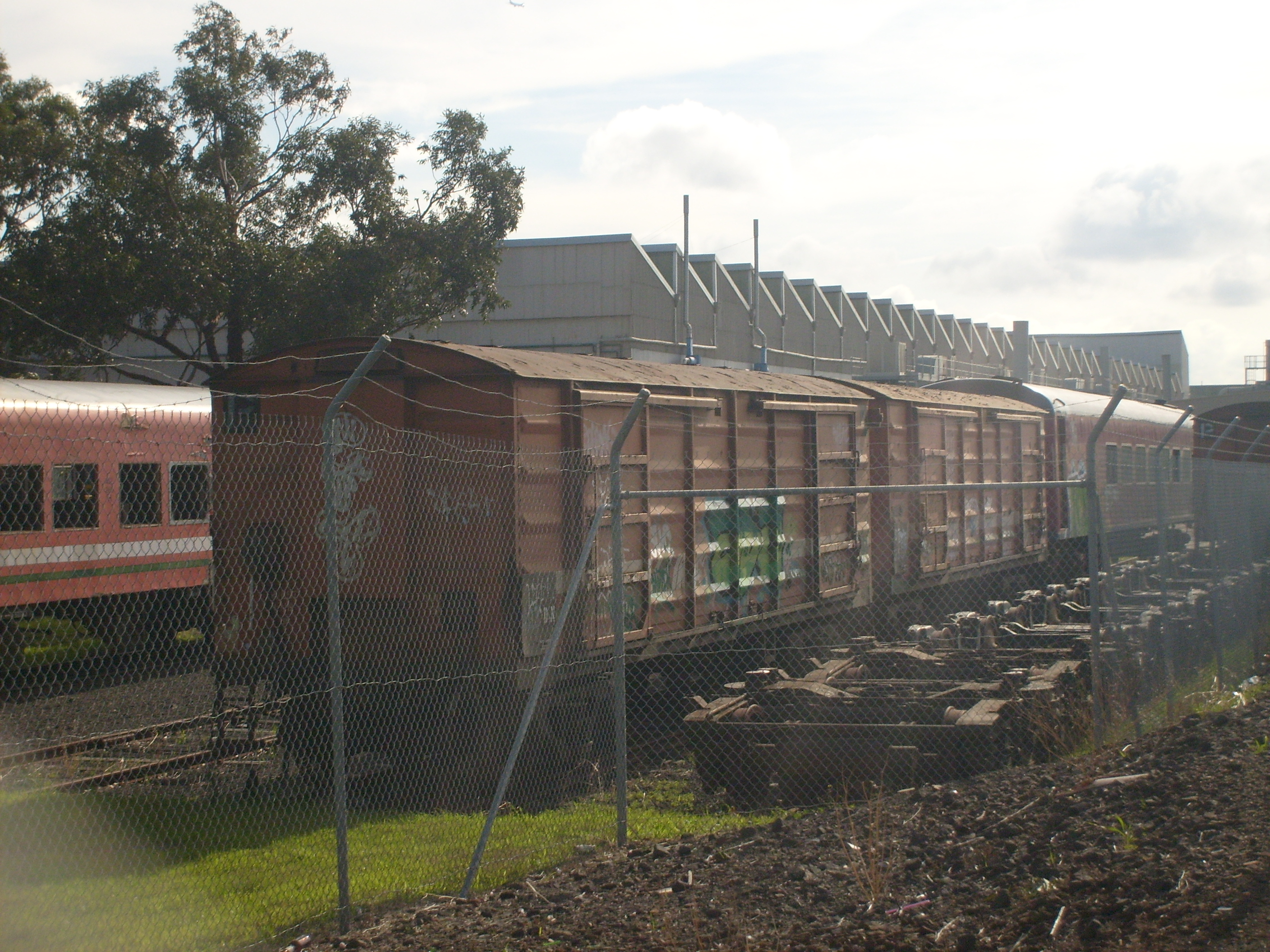

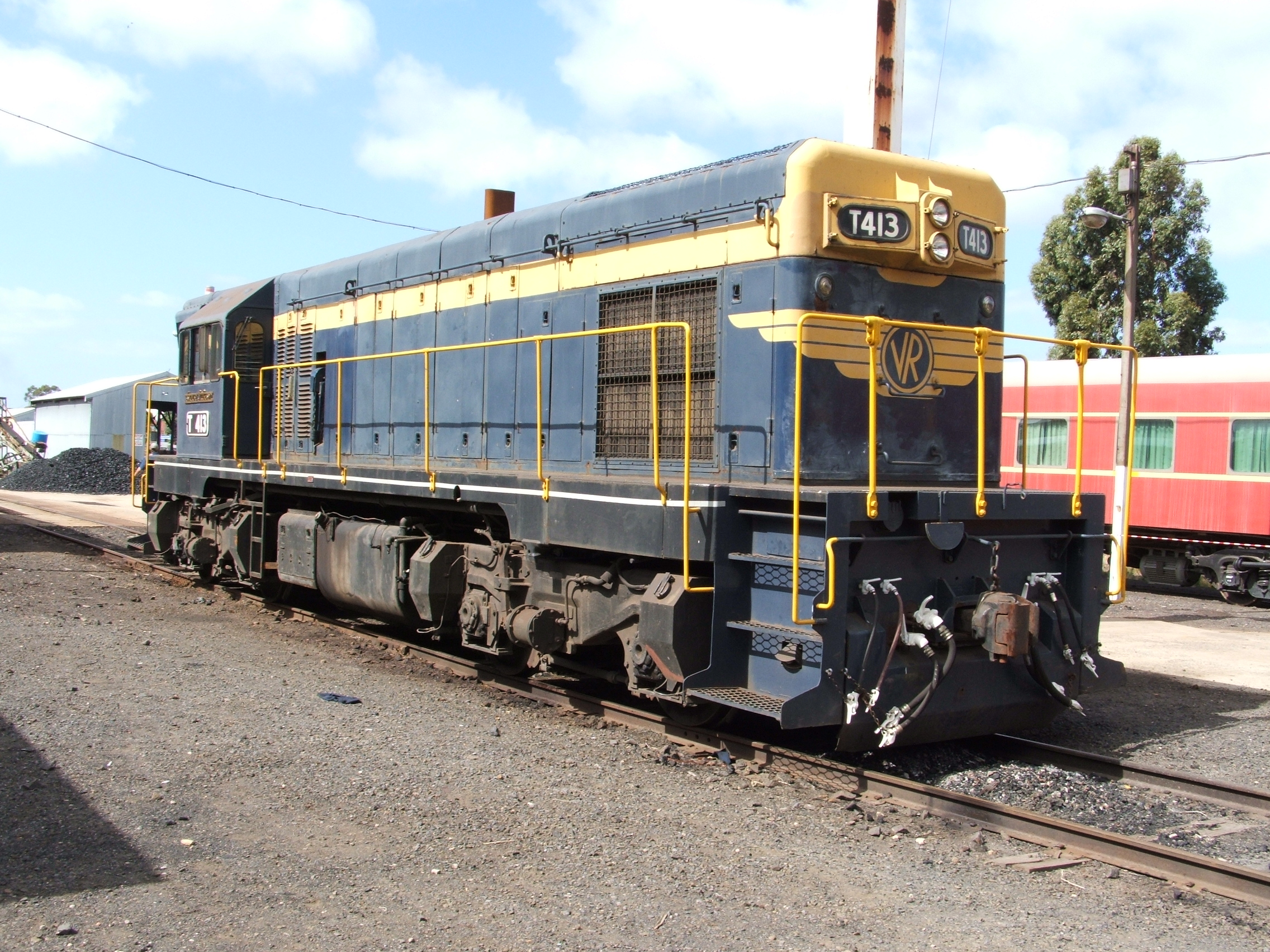

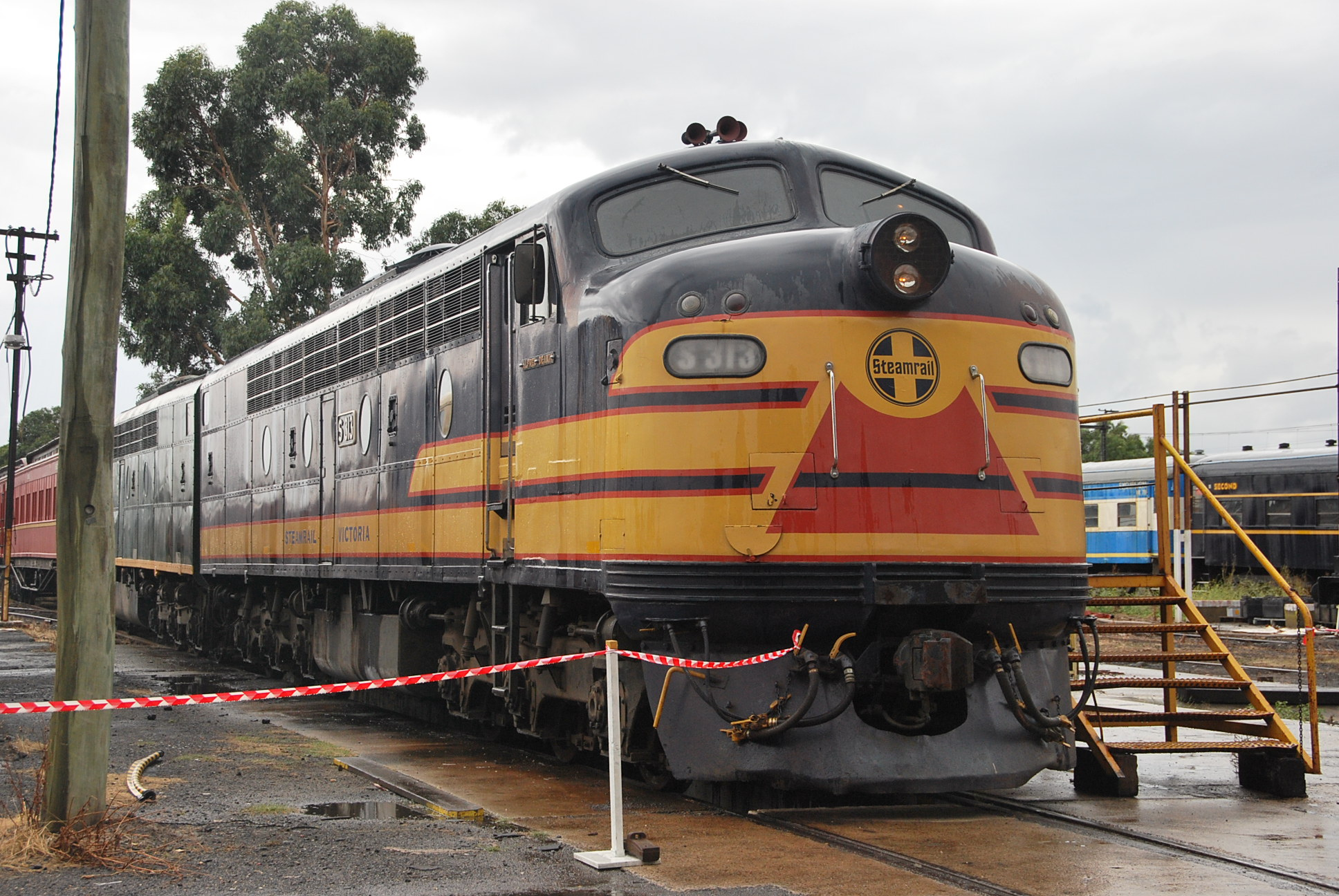

== See also ==
- Steamrail Victoria
- 707 Operations
