= HZX =

HZX may refer to:

- HZX, FAA code for Isedor Iverson Airport, an airport in Minnesota
- HZX, ICAO airline code for Citic General Aviation, China
- HZx, class of fixed-axle wagons used by Victorial Railways departments
