= Victorian Railways flat wagons =

Flat Wagons
- Manufacturer: Victorian Railways
- Operator: Victorian Railways
- Line served: All

Specifications
- Track gauge: 5 ft 3 in (1,600 mm)

The Victorian Railways used a variety of flat wagons for the transport of a wide range of loads. Generally speaking, the bogie wagons were custom-built for the job, while the fixed-wheel variants were cut down from former open wagons. Loadings would be placed on the deck and, if necessary, protected with tarps, then secured to the wagons with chains or rope connecting to lashing rings along the side of the wagon frames.

This page covers flat wagons used for general traffic, but also those reserved for ISO containers and other containerised goods, along with flat wagons fitted with bulkheads or other fittings for specialised traffic such as steel pipes or timber. It does not cover flat wagons that were cut down from open wagons, although links to the relevant articles are provided as appropriate.

Flat wagons in the VR fleet included the letter K, Q or S in their code; which of those largely depended on the era that the wagon entered service. K was the original code, with Q introduced for bogie flat wagons and S between the two world wars. It was also fairly common for various classes of open wagons to have their sides and ends removed, temporarily or permanently, to increase the range of flat wagons available.

Unlike other wagon pages and because the vast majority of the fleet was fitted with bogies, these vehicles are not divided into fixed and bogie variants initially, but instead into various traffic types. Some of the wagons listed here may appear at first glance to be more of an "open wagon" type, but they were listed as flat wagons by the Victorian Railways.

== General traffic wagons ==
=== Original design—K, NK & IK ===
The first general traffic flat wagons to be used on the Victorian railways system were four-wheeled deck units classed "K," with around fifty purchased from Wright & Sons delivered in 1859. Notably, the listed wagons in each of these three orders are not consecutive, indicating either incomplete records or that wagons could have been delivered unnumbered with the details applied as they were utilized for traffic.

Another batch of fifty were constructed by the firm Thomas in 1872. During this period the Victorian Railways constructed their own wagons in parallel; including a number of replacements for older, withdrawn vehicles, the total constructed at Williamstown Workshops came to over 130 units between 1873 and 1885. By the early 1890s, well over 80 open wagons had their sides and ends removed, being reclassed as IK and fitted with removable water tanks for a wide range of uses stretching from water to weed spray to tar. From 1 December 1923, the Victorian Railways took control of the Deniliquin & Moama Railway Company and all its assets, including four flat wagons.

From the late 1920s, the Victorian Railways fleet was being progressively upgraded to westinghouse air brakes, but many of the original K fleet were not able to support the new equipment. These were scrapped and replaced with around a hundred cut-down wagons, almost always ex open wagons of the I type but occasionally with other types mixed in; these took on the former K numbers. Many of the surviving original K fleet had since been modified to other uses, with many allocated to crane or construction trains in various roles, and others being fitted with water tanks.

By the 1960s, the K design had largely been superseded by bogie wagons with higher maximum speeds and capacity relative to tare weight. Between that and the longstanding use of the fleet in auxiliary roles, the code connotation had devolved from a traffic wagon to a departmental code. Reflecting this, the open wagons which had been converted to KCC for snowy mountains cement traffic were cut down and converted to safety wagons, used as spacers between other vehicles for over-length loads, such as pipes to Gippsland, or between combustible loads like explosives and sources of heat, particularly but not exclusively steam locomotives. When 160 IK was withdrawn in 1974, it was replaced with the underframe taken from recently scrapped louvre van U1115.

=== Early bogie wagons (Q) ===
By the 1870s, rail wagon technology had evolved to permit longer wagons fitted with bogies. This allowed higher operating speeds due to better load balancing, and trains were easier to manage with less operating equipment like brakes and couplers over the length, than would be required for shorter fixed-axle wagons. Some of the earlier batch were constructed by the railways, but for the most part the work was contracted out to Thomas or Tozier. Handbrakes were initially applied to bogies individually, and staff were reminded to apply hand brakes at both ends of a wagon when necessary. These early wagons generally operated for 20–30 years, most being withdrawn from normal service before the Great War. The majority were scrapped at the time, but like their K predecessors a portion of the class were recycled in other traffics.

A new batch of Q wagons was built starting from 1913. All vehicles of this type used rivetted plate-frame components and a "fishbelly" underframe design with a strengthened centre to resist twisting.

By the late 1970s Q73 had been allocated specifically to trains originating from Jewell, as a spacer vehicle when transporting cast concrete bridge beams in conjunction with higher-capacity wagons. Other wagons operated in sets, transporting loads of extended, welded rail lengths around the state. These rails were loaded across five wagons at a time, and flexed with the train when running through junctions and around curves.

==== Q129 ====
Q129 is a 5 ft 3 in (1,600 mm) broad gauge skeletal flat wagon built in June 1926, initially to transfer the Garratt locomotives' engine units (Note: The Garratt boiler unit was transferred separately, loaded by cranes in a QB well wagon.) from Newport to Colac and Moe, and later used for the NA class engines as well. It is now preserved at the Menzies Creek Steam Museum adjacent to Menzies Creek railway station on the Puffing Billy Railway.

=== 43ft ACF wagons (S) ===
In 1925, the Victorian and South Australian Railways were experimenting with imported, standardized bogie goods wagons designed by the American Car & Foundry, USA, to replace large portions of their existing fleet. While South Australia adopted the designs wholesale, Victoria elected to only import two each of the louvre, open and flat wagon types and a small number of open-top hoppers. However, the Victorian Railways was apparently satisfied with the Q design, as no further S wagons were constructed or purchased.

During the second world war, demand for flat wagons rose astronomically, and to cater for this about half of the open E wagons had sides and ends removed, being converted to flat wagons. Including the original two flat wagons, by the end of the conversion period there were 100 S flat wagons in service. It has been reported anecdotally that the sides and ends of the E wagons were used as covers for piles of debris at Newport Workshops. After the war, 71 of the S wagons were restored to their original E configuration and identities.

=== Cable drum traffic ===
From 1961, a custom fleet of vehicles were converted for the transport of coils of electrical cables, wrapped around timber drums. The cables were steel with an aluminium shell, produced for the State Electricity Commission, and 1 1/4" thick to handle 222,000 volts. Each drum weighed four tons. They had previously been transported in four-wheel wagons, but the vibration often led to the aluminium coating of the cables being damaged with resulting claims against the Victorian Railways. This was resolved on the bogie wagons with specially designed cradles, and the drums were protected against vibration by recycling withdrawn Westinghouse brake hoses.

==== SF, SEF, SC, SCX, VFFX ====
The first wagon converted was open wagon E78, in July 1961, followed by E125 in December of the same year. Both were fitted with cradles in lieu of sides and ends, and recoded SC.

In 1965, a new, general purpose flat wagon was built at Newport Workshops. Coded SFX1, it had a 63 ft-long frame with timber decking, end bulkheads to keep loads from shifting longitudinally, and a full-length lashing rail along the side for rope or chain securing. Overall, it weighed around 26 tons for a load capacity of 49 tons. ISO container anchor points were provided along with regular stanchions and other fittings, all of which could be stowed in pockets underslung along the deck of the wagon.

After a year of trials, a further 24 SFX wagons were built to the same design, entering service in batches every few months between mid-1967 and mid-1968. Each unit cost around $13,200 to construct. While these were being constructed further orders had been placed, and less than a week after SFX25 had entered service it was followed by SFX26, to a modified design with all-metal construction. It came out of the workshops slightly heavier but far stronger, and construction continued through to SFX50 to that design, then SFX51 to 60 with a wheel-type handbrake in lieu of the ratchet type employed previously. After a gap of nearly a year construction continued with SXF61 in the middle of 1969, with new vehicles on a regular basis until SFX120 entered service in September 1970. It is not clear which was the first SFX to not have full-length lashing rails provided.

As noted below, proper dedicated ISO container flat wagons were under construction at the same time, and that development took precedence. The SFX wagons had reduced value by this point, and were used instead as blank slates for conversions to other traffic. Eight were recoded to QGF for gas transport on the standard gauge system, and nine others to SFF for dedicated runs between Ballarat and Melbourne, and between Bairnsdale and Westall.

In 1977, SFX100 was provided with experimental tarpaulin frames on runners, allowing them to be retracted along the length of the wagon for loading of paper rolls for the Australian Paper Mills. The wagon was only used for the length of the experiment, and then superseded by a production run to the same concept. It was recoded to VFLX100 with the rest of the fleet, but ended up in extended storage before being cut down almost to its original configuration for pineboard transport.

The 1979 recode for SFX was VFLX, same numbers. Within a decade of the recoding, only around 20 vehicles were still in service; the rest had been converted to VQLX container wagons by removing the bulkheads and "skeletising" the floor to reduce tare weight. A handful remained in their original form as at June 1989, generally for departmental traffic including transport of welded rail lengths.

Further detail on the class is available in the Australian Model Railway Magazine, Issue 125, April 1984, although the associated drawing is not accurate.

==== QGF, VQEX & VQEY—Gas transport ====
In 1978, eight SFX bulkhead flat wagons were modified at Newport Workshops for explicit use on the standard gauge carrying loaded gas tanks, fixed within an ISO 20 ft container framework. The wagons had ISO ports fitted and "double shelf" couplers, which took the normal Janney-derived automatic coupler, and fitted steel plates above and below to stop adjacent wagons decoupling in the event of a derailment. The wagons retained their SFX-type bulkheads. It is believed that the fleet only operated in service on the standard gauge line from Melbourne towards Sydney.

==== SFF, VFLY & VFLF ====
In 1978, a set of nine SFX wagons had their gauge-exchange equipment removed, and were allocated to broad gauge containerized traffic between Melbourne and Ballarat, and between Bairnsdale and Westall. In 1979, these wagons were reclassified to VFLY, and in 1988 the final wagon was recoded to VFLF; shortly afterwards it was defrocked and converted to container wagon VQLX119.

=== VFNX Retractable Tarpaulin ===
In parallel with the timber VFTY/X wagons outlined near the end of this article, fifty wagons were constructed for $57,570 each, with the same 63 ft frame and bulkhead design for the transport of rolls of newsprint-quality paper. The traffic originated at Maryvale, in the LaTrobe Valley, and ran to a distribution point at the Montague shipping sheds on the Port Melbourne line. The wagons used a rolling canvas cover, based on the experimental SFX100, to provide shelter for the two layers of paper rolls, and the wagons replaced the use of normal open wagons covered with tarps.

It has been theorized that the design of the vehicles was "home-grown" and when in service the mechanical roller system proved to be unreliable, with hoops often twisting when rolling open or closed leading to delays in loading. Over time the tarpaulins were replaced with yellow polyester materials.

As with the timber wagons, the units were numbered with additional zeros i.e. VFNX003; this may have been to assist with computerized wagon tracking systems by reminding staff to type numerals in the correct slots, but it is more likely that the additional zeros were superfluous.

In 1991, VFNX1 was modified at Bendigo Workshops with an alternative canvas runner system. The same fifteen frameworks were used but a taut, blue plastic tarp was fitted on the outside of the framework rather than between bolsters, and this allowed a better internal mechanism to overcome the binding issues that had previously plagued the class. On completion the vehicle was recoded VFPX, and a further 13 wagons were converted. Numbers were essentially random, though VFNX3 was by chance modified to VFPX3.

== 75ft flat wagons (SKX) ==
From late 1967, a batch of 75 long-body flat wagons entered service, at a cost of around $17,600 each. They were classed SKX and numbered 1 through 75 for general use, to reduce demand on the remaining Q wagons and to ensure that enough ISO container wagons would be available as required. The wagons could be fitted with stanchions as required. They were 75 ft over end sills, had a tare weight of 25 tons and a capacity of 50 tons.

In 1972, four of the SKX series were recoded as SKF (but keeping their numbers), being locked to standard gauge operation between Melbourne and Sydney and fitted with ports for an unusual 37 ft container design. In the 1979 recoding, SKX vehicles became VFKX, and the SKF units were recoded to VFKY.

== Oversize and heavy load wagons ==
This section covers vehicles designed for large and/or heavy loads which would normally be too tall or too heavy for transport with regular rolling stock. Some were designed with a lower central deck between the bogies allowing transport of tall loads, like locomotive boilers and power station equipment, while others were complete custom designs for whatever job was required.

=== QB / VWAA 1–11 ===
The first well wagon was constructed in 1902 at Newport Workshops, and coded QB1. A further ten entered service between 1912 and 1913.

The central portion could carry 14 tons; if a load were evenly distributed across the length of the wagon, the capacity was raised to 30 tons. The wagon itself weighed a little over 17 tons. A common use for the fleet was transport of locomotive boilers, but they could be used for a wide range of goods as required.

Bogies were the 1880s standard "diamondframe" type with spoked wheels; these were later superseded by plate frame and cast bogies, and some wagons received disc wheels. Splashers were fitted over cutouts in the angled slopes, and it appears these may have changed size over time.

=== QB/F / VWAA 12 ===
A twelfth unit was constructed in 1921 to a varied design. No diagram is immediately available, but the wagon appears shorter overall and the central well has vertical rather than sloped walls. It is not clear what sort of framing was used for the central well, or if the entire centre of the wagon was an open frame. Photos indicate timber planks covering the entire section. In January 1962, QB12 was upgraded to "XB" cast bogies fitted with roller bearings, permitting its use on higher speed trains. It had reverted to its previous condition by September of that year. in 1979 the vehicle was recoded to VWAA12, later with the check letter "J" applied. It is not believed that it ever had ISO fixtures installed.

It was marked off register and scrapped in 1986, but spotted at the Spotswood Way and Works depot in 1992. In 2001 it was noted as owned by VicTrack, allocated to the ARHS, but located in the 707 Operations compound in Newport Workshops; at the time it had plain-bearing bogies.

=== QB 13 / QWF 1 / VWCY 1 / VWCF 1 ===
For State Electricity Commission of Victoria traffic to Yallourn, even the QB series proved inadequate. A temporary vehicle had been assembled in 1922 using assorted steel stock and suburban motor carriage bogies to handle the weight. It never had a code or number allocated and was dismantled in 1924, with the parts returned to general stock. A proper heavy-duty vehicle entered service in October 1925, with a completely new design using custom three-axle bogies and a rivetted bar-frame, explicitly for the unique and heavy traffic.

Automatic couplers were added in 1954, one of the last non-passenger vehicles to be so converted. In December 1961, it was reclassified as QW1, and about a month later reclassified to QWF1. In 1979 it was erroneously recoded VWCY, corrected nearly a decade later to VWCF with thousands of other Victorian Railways vehicles. By 1992, it had been stored pending preservation, and by 2001, it was allocated by VicTrack to the DERM Preservation Group in Newport Workshops, although its exact location was unknown.

=== QS 1 / VFHA 1 ===
In 1941, a new, unique and unnumbered wagon was designed and built at Newport Workshops, for the transport of heavy electrical equipment, including stators, to Yallourn. The vehicle was an open framework, each end suspended on bolsters that themselves sat on a pair of four-wheel bogies each, to distribute the load. It was rarely used outside of the Yallourn traffic, and spent most of its time without bogies and with weeds growing through the body.

=== Q 132–135 / QH 1–4 / VFGA 1–4 ===
None of the railways' existing rolling stock was suited for exceedingly heavy loads. To rectify this, four wagons were created using frames recovered from S Class steam locomotive tenders. Initially coded Q132–135, the new vehicles entered service between 1955 and 1957 before being recoded to QH1–4 in 1962.

The first vehicle had something of a skeletal deck, only being fully covered above the bogies, while the remaining three had a completely sealed deck, reinforced side girders and nine pairs of lashing rings fitted to the deck in lieu of six pairs fixed to the side sills. Capacity was 90 tons distributed or 50 tons concentrated in the centre. It is not known which underframe came from each of the four locomotives.

One of the early uses was for transport of equipment to the Hazelwood Power Station in Gippsland, and to the north-east of the state for the Snowy Mountains scheme. After these traffic jobs were resolved the wagons were allocated to runs from Jewell railway station, in Melbourne's inner north, for transporting of large concrete bridge beams. When used with overlong traffic they would generally have "safety" wagons either side, typically empty K type flat wagons.

The Victorian Railways only had five sets of high-capacity, three-axle bogies available. One set was kept for display beneath H 220's tender at the Newport Railway Museum, leaving four sets to rotate between the QH wagons with occasional use QS or QW well wagons as required. When that happened, the QH wagons would be put into storage until the bogies could be returned. All four vehicles are owned by VicTrack and listed as part of the Historic Vehicles Register.

QH1 was reallocated from the Australian Railway Historical Society to the Seymour Railway Heritage Centre in September 2006, and has been reunited with an original welded tender tank. It may have had its bogies swapped with QH4 at some point. The remaining three are stored in various locations around Newport Workshops. Two of the four tender frames have been earmarked for preservation by the Newport Railway Museum, and still used as workshop vehicles at the Newport Workshops.

=== QW2 / VWBA2 ===
The final well wagon entered service in 1960, classed QW2. Another unique design, this vehicle was explicitly designed for loads both overlarge and incredibly heavy. The wagon was rated at 150 tons capacity, and weighed 93 tons on its own.

Because of this incredible mass, well outside normal railway standards for the era, the well wagon unit was not fitted with its own bogies. Instead, it shared second-tier bogie units with QS2 / VFHA2; these were beams that were placed between the wagon frame and four- or six-wheel bogies, depending on the load to be transported. Either two- or three-axle locomotive tender bogies could be fitted, depending on the weight of the load to be transported. If the latter, they were borrowed from the abovementioned QH wagons.

The vehicle was initially used to transport equipment to Cudgewa for the Snowy Mountains scheme, from where the load was trans-shipped to road transport. After the project was completed the vehicle was generally stored at Newport Workshops, only being utilised occasionally.

=== QS 2 / VFHA/VFHF 2 ===
QS2 was built in 1962 to support the Snowy Mountains scheme. It was designed as something of a combination of QS1 and QW2, featuring a longer frame and the ability to be mounted on four of either four- or six-axle bogies as required. While fitted with the two-axle bogies it was capped at 120 tons load, but when the three-axle bogies were in use it could support 170 tons. When not in use it was stored at Newport Workshops.

In 1979, it was officially recoded as either VFHA or VFHF (sources differ), although it is not clear when the change was actually made or if it ever ran in service with that code. By 1990, it had been removed from bogies and placed on the grass in the Workshops compound. Like the other preserved vehicles in this category, it is owned by VicTrack; it is allocated to the ARHS Museum, and stored in the Newport West Block on four, four-wheel bogies fitted with plain bearings.

=== VQWW 1 ===
In 1990, the articulated "three-pack" flat wagon VQAW 5 was constructed with two normal skeletal container flat sections, but the centre unit as a slightly longer well wagon in lieu of the normal design. It was recoded to VQWW within a few weeks. In 1994 it was recoded to RQVY for National Rail use. The tare weight across all three units was 37 tonnes, and the capacity was 113 tonnes.

== Less-than-Container-Load traffic (LCL) ==
For traffic that did not need the full capacity of a standard ISO 20 ft container, smaller units were constructed that were compatible with ISO brackets. These needed custom rolling stock, fitted with brackets at the correct intervals. A standard LCL unit was about 5 ft long, so a 15 ft underframe could be made to hold three containers.

Like later examples with ISO container frames, the mounting points of LCL containers were used with custom carrying designs for specific transport jobs. One of the first dedicated LCL traffic runs in Victoria was for tallow (animal fats) which were transported from Ballarat, Bendigo, Shepparton and Wangratta to Melbourne in insulated, steam-heated drums of 1,510 imp gal (6,900 L) capacity; other early runs included bulk cement deliveries.

=== KC & KMC ===
To cater for this traffic, in 1954, twenty IY wagons had their sides and ends removed and new container locks welded into position. The new vehicles were classed K 87–106, quickly recoded to KC to avoid confusion with generic flat wagons. When that traffic dried up the wagons were used interchangeably with KC's. The fleet had been withdrawn by the end of 1980.

=== 43ft QC, QCF, QCX & QTF ===
In 1959, ten E open wagons had their sides removed and replaced with locks at suitable positions, permitting carrying of six LCL containers each. . A further three were converted in 1970 and coded QTF, explicitly reserving them for tallow traffic from the pet food factory in Wodonga, and an abattoir in Wangaratta. The wagons were withdrawn by 1978 and converted to HR bogie transport vehicles.

== Standardised Intermodal container (ISO) traffic ==
This section covers wagons designed with the standard 20 ft container in mind, being fitted with securing ports at distinct intervals. Many of these wagons could be used in other traffic if required, but such use was rare—particularly for the skeletal variants.

=== Bogie stock ===
==== FQX, FQF, VQCX & VQCY (63ft deck) ====
1969 saw the Victorian Railways' first official foray into ISO traffic. A design was shared between the Victorian and South Australian Railways and coded FQX, with SAR wagons numbered below 500 and Victorian wagons 501 and above. The wagons were also fitted with provision for baulks and stanchions, if required in general use. The loading diagram indicates that when used for loading mounted on baulks, weight permitted was 27.5 tons over each bogie, decreasing to 10 tons in the centre and less on the ends. Wagons weighed a little under 20 tons each, had a maximum capacity of 55 tons, and cost around $37,670 each to build.

In the late 1970s, about 100 FQX wagons were recoded to FQF, exclusively for use on the broad gauge system, to ensure that enough vehicles were available for intrastate traffic. Aside from changing the code, many FQF wagons had full-length lashing rails added along the side frames, and the number was placed on a panel below the frame rather than painted directly onto it.

In 1993, 75 wagons were randomly selected and recoded to VQRF, numbers 1 through 75, specifying that they were to be used for rice container traffic from Echuca to ports in Melbourne and Geelong. They were most often loaded with one 20 ft container either end, and the centre portion of the wagon used for loading and unloading.

In late 1994, most of the freight fleet was transferred over to the National Rail Corporation, and the remaining VQCX wagons were reletterred to RQCX. By 1996 they were being returned to V/Line and their previous designations, as NR introduced new build articulated container wagon sets in their place, although some had been painted grey.

===== VQMX =====
In 1997, seventy wagons, randomly selected, had a different type of container lock fitted to speed up loading and unloading; these were recoded VQMX. In 1998, a further group were recoded to TQCY, being specifically allocated to Toll Group traffic. When Freight Victoria, later Freight Australia, acquired the V/Line Freight division, the remaining wagons were included in the sale. A few years later some were transferred to Pacific National, while others were sold to Queensland Rail. The latter recoded their new acquisitions QQGY, for use on the Melbourne to Brisbane services.

===== AQCX =====
The South Australian fleet were mostly identical, with only minor differences in brake equipment and storage of fittings. They totalled 122 units, and when overtaken by Australian National they were recoded from FQX/F to AQCX/Y. The whole fleet was sold to National Rail, who modified the wagons by removing portions of the deck, in order to reduce wagon weight. The newly "skeletised" wagons were coded RQTY.

==== FCF, FCW, VQDW & VQEW (81ft "Jumbo" flats) ====
From 1973, experiments were run with a new type of wagon designed to transport taller-than-normal containers. The larger containers were needed for a contract with TNT to move General Motors Holden car components between Acacia Ridge (QLD), Fishermans Bend, Geelong (VIC) and Elizabeth (SA), and were built at a cost of $76,540 each. The wagons initially ran in conjunction with South Australian FCW and New South Wales JCW, although in modern times they tend to be used in general traffic.

Known colloquially as the "Jumbo" container flats, the new design was achieved using bogies with smaller diameter wheels to give a lower deck, and counteracted with "gooseneck" couplers to restore the coupler centreline to the correct height. At 85 feet plus couplers, the wagons were the longest employed on the network, designed to carry two 40 ft containers or four 20 ft containers. Given this length, they were banned from being coupled to fixed-wheelbase vehicles. They had a strong centre sill with a skeletal framework around it, giving a tare weight of less than 24 tons, and a capacity of 53 tons. The excess length risked problems with overhang on tight curves in Melbourne Yard, so to help avoid this the wagons were coupled into sets of five each. The wagons were fitted with two brake pipes at each end, one either side of the coupler. The fleet was permitted to operate at 70 mph / 115 km/h, although when loaded to a gross weight between 76 and 80 tons the speed limit decreased to 50 mph / 80 km/h. To account for the longer and taller Jumbo containers, the high-speed bogies were fitted with wheels of 838 mm (33.0 in) rather than the normal 921 mm (36.3 in) diameter.

Vincent notes that most of the fleet had actually been constructed earlier, but were kept in storage until mid-1976. The initial order had been for fifty wagons but the contract was terminated at 25. Sixteen wagons were also constructed at the Islington Workshops for the South Australian Railways, entering service between 1973 and 1974, and 32 JQW (later NQJW) wagons were built by the New South Wales Railways. The first three entered service by January 1974, then rakes 4-9 in February 1976, 10-14+25 in May 1976, and 15-16-17-18-23-24 in June 1976. Wagons FCF19-22 had been in use as workshop transfer wagons, for moving steel loads around Newport Workshops, before they entered proper service as goods wagons.

An industrial dispute was triggered when the wagons entered service due to difficulties in managing their length while shunting in Dynon yard. This was resolved by only working the wagons in sets of up to six, and only in dedicated traffic which avoided most of the shunting requirements.

In 1977, the Victorian code was changed to FCW, both to avoid confusion with the newly recoded FQF-ex-FQX wagons, and to indicate the custom bogies. The "W" suffix indicated that bogie exchange was possible, but only within the "W" group. In 1979 the code was changed again to VQDW, while the South Australian wagons became AQDW.

From 1 June 1986, thirty VQDWs were leased to the State Rail Authority of New South Wales, those being 1, 3, 26, 30-36, 38, 40-31, 43-51, 57, 59-60, 64, 68-69 and 74-75.

Between 1986 and 1988, 12 unidentified wagons were leased from V/Line to Australian National and were renumbered AQDW 17–28; within a year they had been modified by AN to feature fixed shunters steps in lieu of the retractable design that V/Line had been using. The wagons were restored to their VQDW code and number on return to V/Line.

In 1990, VQDW 66 was fitted with the "Roadmaster" bogies which had previously been placed under test wagon VQPW 1. It was reclassed to VQEW 66, and permitted to operate at 115 km/h. When leased to the National Rail Corporation from 1994, Jumbo container wagons were leased or purchased from Victoria, New South Wales and South Australia and grouped together as the single RQDW class.

While under NR control, sixteen wagons were recoded RQDF and a further four as RQDY, likely indicating higher speed bogies. Ten were recoded to RQNW indicating mounting points for 48 ft containers along with higher maximum speeds, and the remaining twenty-one ex-NSW vehicles were recoded RQPW—although it is not clear (at time of writing) what distinguishing feature makes the new class necessary. It is unlikely that there is any relationship to the test wagon VQPW 1.

Pacific National now owns the remaining fleet, having acquired them through National Rail as well as Freight Victoria / Freight Australia.

==== SQEF/SQEY ("Jumbo" flats) ====
When QUBE Logistics won a number of freight contracts from Pacific National in 2013, they invested in a fleet of skeletal container wagons. The standard gauge wagons have a tare weight of 23 tonnes and a capacity of 77 tonnes, while the broad gauge wagons are slightly heavier with a commensurate reduction in capacity. Notably, the axles of these were designed to permit future conversion to standard gauge, although the bogie bolsters would still restrict the vehicles to the lower speed limit.

===== Delivery =====
The wagons were unloaded at Carrington wharf in pairs, with the broad gauge wagons placed on top of the standard gauge units and tied together for the run down to the QUBE depot in Somerton. On arrival they were unloaded by crane and gradually placed into service.

==== QMX, VQFX/Y, RCFX/F/Y (63ft skeletal) ====
By 1978 it was becoming clear that ISO containers were the future of long-distance transport, so the railways had a reduced requirement for wagons that could be used with other goods. To cut down the weight and cost of construction, the FQX design was modified to a skeletal layout.

Forty wagons to the new design were initially constructed at Bendigo, followed by 20 at Newport. All had entered service by the middle of 1978. The code was unusual relative to previous VR practice because the 1979 recoding was just around the corner, and it would have been easy to recode from "QMX" to "VQMX". However, by the time the new codes were adopted the official code was "VQFX", requiring repainting of the code boards.

A further 75 wagons were built in 1980 at Bendigo Workshops, entering service as VQFX. In the late 1980s these latter vehicles were provided with upgraded bogies, permitting higher speeds for the Melbourne to Adelaide Superfreighter services. They were reclassified VQFY to reflect the higher operating speed.

The remaining sixty vehicles were leased to the National Rail Corporation in 1994 and reclassed RQFX. Speculation at the time was that the fleet would be returned to Victoria, but a number were upgraded to 2CM bogies permitting a higher operating speed, and recoded to RQFY. Many are now operating with Pacific National, as RQFX.

==== VQGX ====
During 1980–1981, the remaining fourteen flexi-van bogie wagons, classed VQBX/VQBY, were converted to regular container wagons, and reclassed VQGX.

In 1994 the entire class of sixteen was leased to the National Rail Corporation and recoded RQZX., although when returned to Victoria in 1996 they were restored to their earlier codes. In 1997, VQGX 14 was reclassified as VZKF14.

==== VQKX ====
Between April and July 1990, eight VFKX flat wagons were converted to VQKX 1–8. A further seven were converted between July and September, numbered 100–106, although there is no apparent difference between the two series. The wagons had container ports spaced to permit loading of pairs of 30 ft ISO units, for CRT Group traffic between Bandiana and Melbourne.

==== VQLX ====
Following on from other conversions of assorted general traffic flat wagons to container flat wagons, between 1987 and 1989, 115 ex-SFX and similar wagons were stripped down with ends, side stanchions and decks removed, and replaced with container anchor fittings, for three 20 ft containers.

==== VQAW & VQWW (articulated) ====
In 1989 V/Line decided to experiment with a new articulated type of container wagon, using three skeletal decks each with a capacity of one 40 ft or two 20 ft containers, and suspended over four bogies. VQAW2 entered service in late 1989 as a trial, fitted with "Roadmaster" bogies. VQAW 3 and 4 entered service in March and May 1990 respectively, to the same design, but VQAW5 was built using a well wagon design for the centre unit instead of the flat design of the rest. Within a few weeks it had been recoded VQWW 1.

In November 1990, VQAW 1 finally entered service, this time fitted with experimental Gloucester bogies. A few weeks later, VQAW2 derailed near Homebush, New South Wales. Victorian and New South Wales authorities could not agree on the cause, so NSW banned the VQAW series from their network.

==== VQSW ====
This was a short-lived experiment in 1992, to trial a shorter-framed, low-level skeletal container wagon with capacity for only one 40 ft, 45 ft or 48 ft, or two 20 ft containers. The project ran out of funds, so only VQSW 1 was built. The wagon had a tare weight of about 15.5 tonnes, and a capacity of around sixty tonnes. It was provided with a "miner" type handbrake at one end.

==== VQOX ====
Between 1994 and 1995, "at least fifteen" VOFX bogie open wagons had their doors removed, and brackets installed in the deck for two 20 ft ISO containers. They were recoded VQOX, and later had the side panels between the former doors removed as well, when forklift operators found it difficult to load and unload containers efficiently.

==== VQPW ====
In February 1987, VOBX 366 had everything above the frame removed, and container brackets fitted to carry two 20 ft ISO units. It was provided with new "roadmaster" bogies, as an experiment for a new type to be introduced under the forthcoming VQAW three-pack articulated vehicles. It was reclassified as VQPW 1. In 1992 the bogies were transplanted to VQEW 66, and it was scrapped in 1993.

==== VECX, VEDW & VEKX—Head end power ====
In 1990 and 1991, eighteen VKFX and two VQFX wagons were modified with container ports fitted, but also with 415vAC head-end power cables, sockets and isolation equipment. When coupled and connected to a head-end power supply, whether from a locomotive, power van or "power pack" container, the wagons could provide power to loaded containers that needed built-in refrigeration for perishable goods, primarily fruit traffic from the Sunraysia District.

=== Fixed-wheel stock ===
Due to limited funding, from the 1960s through the 1980s, the railways were not able to construct or acquire enough bogie container wagons.

==== KQ ====
To overcome this, thirty outside-sill RY wagons were rebuilt at Bendigo Workshops in 1969 as KQ 1–30, followed by 31–60 converted at Ballarat North Workshops in 1972–73. The former open wagons had everything above the underframe removed, and replaced with four container locks and six hardwood floor bearers the length of the frame; the latter to keep containers slightly elevated in order to avoid water pooling under a loaded container.

The wagons were only able to carry a single 20 ft container, and many were semi-permanently fitted with MC cattle containers in lieu of constructing new cattle wagons. They could be coupled to KL type wagons, if a container was on a wagon and its contents needed to be accessed. The fleet did not last long, with the majority scrapped between 1978 and 1981 as new bogie wagons entered service.

==== KMQ ====
Immediately following the cessation of the RY to KQ conversion program, the Victorian Railways switched to conversion of U, T, and KAB frames as a longer variant of the four-wheel container wagon concept. As previously, this was necessary because of a massive increase in traffic and no money available to construct new container wagons; in conjunction with much of the older four-wheel stock being withdrawn due to life expired bodies. Those bodies were removed (and often sold), and the frames fitted with container lugs and fitting a chequer-plate floor surface for traction. The frames were otherwise mostly unchanged, retaining the previous coupler and brake arrangements.

Number boards were installed at the left end of each side, but these projected above the frame and were often damaged during loading; eventually they were moved to the middle of the frame on each side.

Some were fitted with additional container mounting points; 77 through 80 were able to carry a pair of 10 ft non-ISO containers, while 133–135 could take three 8'2.5" containers for transport between Sale and Dandenong. These containers were not to be lifted from the wagons without explicit authority from the manufacturing plant.

==== KL loading platforms ====
When a bogie container wagon was loaded with a pair of 20 ft container wagons, they were placed with doors facing inwards and the centre deck was left free to permit access to the containers for loading and unloading before departure. This wasn't practical with the shorter KQ and KMQ wagons, which had no free deck space when loaded with a single 20 ft container. To overcome this issue, twenty long-wheelbase open wagons were reduced to frames, with a new sheet-metal deck fitted to act as a loading platform in yard areas.

Access in this way was particularly important in the early period of containerisation, when most loading sites did not have the necessary cranes or forklifts to remove containers from the wagons. As that equipment propagated the KL wagons became less important, and the fleet was withdrawn between the late 1970s and early 1980s.

In service, to replicate the utility of a single 63 ft wagon loaded with two 20 ft containers facing inwards, sets of wagons were assembled as KQ-KL-KQ with doors facing inwards. There is no indication as to what sort of material might have been used to cover the gap between KL and adjacent KQ wagons during loading, so the most likely answer is whatever was nearby that could take weight and span the 4 ft gap.

== Specialist traffic ==
=== Firebrick traffic—KB ===
In 1970, open wagon IA 12711 had its sides and floor cut out. The floor was replaced with a grid, and the sides with five doors each. The interior of the wagon was then divided in half lengthwise and five compartments either side for a total of ten distinct areas. Initially for briquette traffic, by 1972 the wagon was being used for palletised firebricks from Dandenong to Yallourn. It was recoded KB 1 and used in that form until 1979. The vehicle was stencilled on the side as "Palletised firebricks Dandenong to Yallourn and Morwell". It was scrapped in October 1979.

=== Cement traffic—KCC ===
When the Snowy Mountains hydro-electric project was under construction in the 1960s, cement was railed from Geelong to Cudgewa then shifted to road vehicles for final delivery.

To make this trans-shipment easier and faster, custom plywood containers were designed and a group of 170 randomly assorted open, flat and ten cattle wagons were modified between 1962 and 1965 to transport them. The open wagons had their doors removed and the cattle wagons had their entire bodies removed, then container securing plugs were fitted. Each KCC wagon could carry two, seven-ton loaded cement containers.

The Cudgewa line was one of Victoria's steepest, and runaway vehicles were frequent leading to some of the KCC fleet being scrapped after only a year or two in service. One such train was recorded at twice the maximum permitted speed around a curve before derailing. Written-off KCC wagons were replaced with other conversions taking on the same number.

As the cement traffic reduced the KCC wagons were stored, then modified for other uses as required. Generally speaking they were converted to IC (coal tippler), IK (safety wagons) and IT (timber wagons) between 1966 and 1969. Only six remained by mid 1975, stored at Newport Workshops, and even these were scrapped by 1980.

=== Motor car bodies—KF ===
In 1959, a set of 124 I and IA wagons were converted with doors removed, for the transport of motor car bodies from North Geelong to the new Ford plant at North Campbellfield. The wagons were initially coded KF 1–124, but this changed to KW in 1961 when the "F" suffix was used to identify "fast" vehicles with upgraded bogies, allowing running at 50 mph. By this point only 58 of the fleet were still running.

Each wagon could hold two motor car bodies, one on the floor and another suspended on removable beams attached to stanchions where the doors had previously been attached to the wagon bodies. The wagons weighed 7.5 tons each.

In 1962 a further 100 wagons were added to the KW fleet, becoming KW125–224; these ex-open wagons only had their doors removed, so could only transport one car body each rather than two. From 1962 to 1964 the fleet was either scrapped, restored to I/IA format, or converted to DW water, IT timber or KCC cement wagons.

=== Prestige Containers—KPC ===
In 1963 a pair of K flat wagons were fitted with custom container ports, for the loading of containers from the Ararat fabric mills to West Footscray yard for distribution. The two were classed KPC and numbered 501 and 502, with the "P" in the code indicating the "Prestige" factory. The containers were supplied and loaded by the company.

=== Flexi-Van traffic ===
During early containerisation trials, the concept of the Flexi Van was introduced on Australian Railways. This involved semi-skeletal flat wagons with a turntable mounted in the middle, so that containers could be unloaded perpendicular to the train instead of requiring a crane. This method had been deployed successfully in America by the New York Central Railroad.

==== FV, FVF ====
To test the method, the South Australian Railways constructed four FV wagons; two for their system and two for the Victorian Railways.

In 1962 the VR's wagons were reclassified as FVF. They operated both on broad and (from 1966) standard gauge, although the latter was far more common. By 1979 they were both stored. It is not clear whether either wagon wore the code VQAY, and they certainly never operated as such. Instead, in 1982, they were converted to safety wagons (to separate dangerous loads from the rest of a consist), and recoded VDSY. Side sills were added to strengthen the underframes, and the central turntables were removed. By 1988 they had been recoded to VDSF.

==== TVF, TVX, VQBY, VQBX ====
The concept of the flexi van was deemed a success by both the New South Wales and Victorian Railways, and 25 TVF wagons were introduced for the Victorian Railways between 1962 and 1964 for the standard gauge service between Melbourne and Sydney.

Several TVF flat wagons were noted as under construction at Newport Workshops in 1962, with the first four all in service by the end of May, mounted on New South Wales Railways-supplied National Industrial C1 cast steel, SKF roller bearing bogies with clasp brakes.

The first TVF was recorded as weighing 24 long tons 3 cwt 1 qtr 7 lb (24.553 t), but design revisions put 4TVF down to only 24 long tons 0 cwt 0 qtr 7 lb (24.388 t). Each TVF was rated to carry 46 long tons (47 t), across two 35 ft (11 m) trailers. By the end of May 1962 the order, originally for only five TVF vans, had increased to ten. Wagons 1-10 were classed TVF, and wagons from 11 onwards as TVX.

A further sixteen vehicles were built from 1964, TVX 26–42, though with an "unusual" practice in that some wagons carried numbers in both the Victorian Railways' TVX two-digit series, and the New South Wales Railways' five-digit series. The ten wagons built by Goodwins in 1964 were numbered 12416-12425 in the New South Wales series (with the first two previously having been 5065 and 5066), while the Newport-built TVX33-35 and the Clyde-built wagons from TVX36 onwards were also identified as 12433 onwards. These new wagons differed from 1-25, where the trailers were loaded onto the wagons with facing inwards, against the new method where trailers would face outwards with their rears in the centre of the wagon.

Four vehicles—27, 29, 31 and 32—were recoded to TVF in the early 1970s.

During 1980–1981, the remaining fleet of sixteen vehicles was converted to ISO-compatible container wagons, and reclassed VQGX. Seven retained the drop-ends with the central turntable well filled in, and the other nine had whole new decks fitted.

=== Pyneboard traffic ===
A small fleet of wagons were put aside for exclusive use by the Pyneboard factory, shipping sheets of compressed, pulped and rolled woodchips to Montague for distribution as an interior construction material. The factory was initially set up in Rosedale, before shifting to Mount Gambier just west of the Victorian and South Australian border in 1978.

==== QAB / VFCA ====
In 1963, Q flat wagon number 77 was rebuilt with a fixed bulkhead at one end and an adjustable bulkhead at the other. The fleet was intended to have been recoded VFCA in 1979, but they had all been scrapped by 1981.

==== SBX / VFJX ====
Traffic from the factory in Rosedale increased, and in response five new bogie wagons were constructed at Bendigo and classed SBX. The vehicles were initially priced at around $11,500 each and fitted with fixed bulkheads, but the non-handbrake end was modified to the adjustable type of the QAB wagons within a few years.

==== KAB ====
In 1964/65 eleven U vans had their bodies removed at Bendigo Workshops. The newly cleared underframes were then fitted out in the same fashion as the QAB and SBX before them, this time with an adjustable loading area of between 20'11" and 24'10". The rebuilt wagons were classed KAB and numbered 1 to 11. A further 10 were added to the fleet in 1974, also built in Bendigo. The KABs were withdrawn during the early 1980s, and some converted to KMQ container wagons.

==== FPX / VFMX ====
In 1978, around the time the Pyneboard factory shifted to Mount Gambier, six randomly selected SFX flat wagons were recoded to FPX and renumbered 101 to 106. Bau notes that the major change was the fitting of a lashing bar, in addition to the lashing rings, along the wagon side frames, while Vincent writes that the lashing rail was only fitted on one side, and the other side had webbing winches fitted. The latter view is supported by McGrath's photo of VFMX 110 circa 1908. Vincent further mentions that the new origin required gauge-exchangeable bogies, but as the whole route was still broad gauge at the time it is not clear why.

=== Steel traffic ===
In 1967, a new steel rolling plant opened at Hastings, Victoria. Steel slabs were railed down to a branch line on the Stony Point Line, and rolled into thin sheetmetal primarily for the construction of cars in South Australia. Dedicated trains ran between the plant and Melbourne Yard; between there and South Australia the wagons were attached to regularly operating interstate trains.

==== SLX ====
As a stop-gap measure until proper vehicles could be organised, the traffic was handled with ten ELX wagons modified to handle the coils. The wagons returned to their original ELX configuration and numbers about a year later, after a full train of CSX wagons had entered service.

==== CSX, VFSX, VCSX, RCSF ====
A batch of thirty CSX wagons 1 to 30 was constructed between 1966 and 1969 at Newport Workshops, using recycled tender frames from scrapped R Class steam locomotives and featuring ratchet handbrakes.

A further sixty wagons CSX 31 to 90 were built at Ballarat North Workshops between 1972 and 1973, using wheel-type handbrakes. The new wagons were built with even shorter crew platforms at both ends, giving a design over pulling lines of 39'6.75", nine inches shorter than the extended CSX2–30 type. They entered service with tarpaulin hoops and end-bulkheads in place in order to shelter the steel from weather effects during transit and cut down on rust; these were later retrofitted to the first thirty vehicles.

Bray and Vincent note the wagon price of around $15,570 each, but it isn't clear whether that applies to the earlier or later batch. The steel coils were very heavy, so like iron ore wagons the vehicles were relatively short. This gave more axles per train, spreading the total weight.

In the 1979 recoding the wagons became VFSX. In the late 1980s a modification of the standard codes freed the second letter "C" to distinguish "coil steel" traffic from other flat wagons, and the code became VCSX. All wagons were recoded thus except 81 and 86, which had been damaged in 1982 and written off. The majority of the wagons were transferred from V/Line to the National Rail Cooperation in 1994, and recoded RCSX shortly after. With the standard gauge between Melbourne and Adelaide opening in 1995 the wagons were upgraded from 50 ton capacity to 70 ton capacity bogies, and the tarpaulin hoops and bulkheads were removed; tarps were simply pulled over the load and tied down instead. The change was workable because track quality had increased over time, permitting heavier axle loads. With these changes the code was altered to RCSF and the fleet was redeployed to Port Kembla in New South Wales. Not all wagons were repainted.

By 2003, the smaller coils were being placed in 20 ft containers for better protection, but these were incompatible with the RCSF fleet. As a result, flat wagons were converted to RCAF to take the containers, and some of the RCSF fleet were modified to only take "jumbo" coils.

==== VKKX ====
Around 1990, eleven VFKX 75 ft flat wagons were fitted with baulks and reallocated to slab steel traffic. The wagons retained their numbers.

==== Other classes ====
From 1964, a small group of 26 wagons were constructed to the same general principles as the ELX type open wagons, which themselves were extended variants of the E-series open wagons that shared components with the S type flat wagons outlined above. The new batch of wagons were constructed with reinforced ends, but stanchions in lieu of doorways and sides, and they were fitted with timber planks across the base. They were intended to be used in steel traffic, hence the code ESX, but that never happened. Instead, the wagons were reallocated for pipe traffic as sewage, gas and water supply systems were extended around the state. In 1971 the class was fitted with longer couplers. Wagons had a tare weight of just over 21 tons, and a load capacity of 50 tons.

In the late 1970s, the NSW and Victorian Railways finally organised a contract for the transport of slab steel from Port Kembla, south of Sydney, to Hastings, south of Melbourne, replacing vessels running around the coastline. The ESX wagons were used for the broad gauge portion of this journey from Albury to Hastings, although it is not clear why the loads were trans-shipped instead of being bogie-exchanged either at Albury or Melbourne.

Other open wagons of the ELX type were also rebuilt for the transport of steel coils, either in cradles (VOSX/VCCX), or vertically (VOVX/VCVX).

=== Timber traffic ===
==== Fixed wheel ====
Timber was usually transported using generic flat or open wagons. However, from the late 1950s, more specialised vehicles were introduced, keyed to the requirements of individual traffic sets.

===== KT, KS, IS & IT =====
Between 1956 and 1957, timber traffic in the East Gippsland region increased, and pine tree billets needed to be railed from Bairnsdale and Heyfield to the paper manufacturing plant in Maryvale. To cater for this, 45 IY wagons had their ends extended, while the sides were removed and replaced with stanchions and internal dividers which split the wagon into three bays of roughly 7 ft each. The ends and internal dividers were braced.

KT 324 used a slightly different design to the rest of the class; instead of diagonal angle iron bracing, vertical plates with sections cut out were used.

As traffic grew even further through the early 1960s, about 270 I and IA 15 ft-wheelbase wagons were randomly selected for conversion to scantling timber transport. Pockets were cut into the floor of the wagons to store chains for securing the loads.

Open wagon I 11835 had been officially scrapped in 1957, but at the end of 1962 it was recovered and converted to IT 1. After a few months of trials conversions began in earnest, and by March 1973 a total of 273 wagons had been converted.

The timber loading siding at Bairnsdale station was usually occupied with between 10 and 15 KT wagons, being loaded by a travelling overhead gantry crane.

The first KS, 320, only lasted in service for about a year before being converted to KS 1, with its ends cut down to normal size and central bulkheads removed for generic sawn timber sheet transport. A further five unknown vehicles were converted to KS 2–5 of the same design and KS 6 with extended sides.

The KT wagons ran in service until 1972, when the Maryvale paper mill switched to full-length pine logs delivered by road. In that year, KT 357 had its frame cut in the centre and extended by four feet, being reclassified IT 252. After that test proved successful, a further 21 of the fleet were converted to IS trucks 2–22 for scantling timber, in lengths up to 25 feet long. They joined a previous conversion, IA 11869 to IS 1 in 1971, although that wagon was normal height and retained its sides and doors.

===== KM, KPW and KW =====
Three other experimental four-wheel wagons were constructed for timber-related traffic.

KM 1, the masonite wagon, was converted from open wagon I 15125 in 1958. The sides were mostly removed and replaced with a new panel in the centre, and strengthening ribs were fitted inside the ends to compensate for the lost strength. There is no available information regarding the specific traffic. It was stored around 1960, and in 1965 it was modified to cement wagon KCC 170.

KPW 1, the pulpwood wagon, was converted from open wagon IA 11350 in 1967. It had tall ends but no sides, instead having three removable fence panels each side. It is thought that the primary traffic was from Colac. The wagon was stored at Newport Workshops from 1974, and scrapped in 1977.

KW 1, the woodchip wagon, was converted from open wagon IA 10632 in 1967. It had tall ends, but the sides were replaced with a braced framework supporting four outward-swinging mesh sheet doors each. Primary traffic was supposed to have been from Colac with a log chipper and storage hopper erected in the station yard, but "something went wrong" and instead the logs were chipped at the sawmill then trucked direct to Melbourne. The wagon was unused for a full decade, until in 1977 when the sides and ends were removed and it was converted to standard gauge, painted yellow and used for transporting parts around the South Dynon Locomotive Depot.

==== Bogie stock ====
In 1979, the Victorian Railways decided to construct a small fleet of bogie wagons for timber transport.

===== VFTY/F/X =====
These became the first class to enter service with a four-letter code, VFTY, numbers 001 to 030. The zero prefix was in anticipation of a future computerised rolling stock management system. They were built at Ballarat Workshops at the same time as the VFNX flat wagons, and shared much of the design with that fleet.

The design was a flat wagon about 20 metres long, with fixed bulkheads at either end to a height of 3,167mm. Between the bulkheads were ten pairs of stanchions, the middle four on each side removable. One end, labelled "A", featured the miner-type handbrake wheel, while the other end was labelled "B", and the centre section with the removable stanchions was labelled "C". Each vehicle was priced at around $50,820 to construct.

Primary traffic was the Orbost line, replacing the IT wagons, but due to reduced maintenance the wooden bridges were unable to support the weight of two fully loaded VTFY wagons adjacent. To resolve this, random four-wheel wagons were required to be coupled between pairs, but this limited the train's maximum speed.

By the late 1980s, most had been recoded to VFTF, fixing the original incorrect code. As timber traffic reduced some were recoded VTFX and placed on standard gauge for pipe traffic. But between 1987 and 1991, the majority of the fleet were converted to container wagons. They were grouped with the ex-VFLX series as VQLX, despite being over a metre longer at 20716mm against 19,488mm.

===== VFHX =====
In late 1995, log traffic increased again, so four VFNX wagons—4, 18, 122 and 144—were rebuilt with the retractable tarp mechanisms removed, and six sets of floor bolsters and stanchions fitted. The vehicles were recoded VFHX as the next available code in the sequence but retained their numbers, and they operated between the loading point at Warragul and the export point at Geelong. VFHX122 lost the curved top on one of its bulkheads fairly early on, and the handbrake end was squared off about a year later.

===== VFTX =====
As containerisation came to represent the majority of general freight on the railways, most of the VLEX louvre vans had been placed into storage. By the late 1990s Freight Victoria led a strong marketing campaign to acquire sawn log traffic from the Gippsland region to North Geelong, and to accommodate this 44 VLEX vans had their sides and roofs removed and replaced with stanchions and winches for the traffic. They were then recoded VFTX and numbered 1 to 44. By this point all the original VFTX wagons had been withdrawn or converted to other types, avoiding a conflict.

==== Carriage transport ====
The G and GH trucks were primarily used for the transport of horse-drawn carriages, but may also have been available for farming machinery and other vehicles. They were a flat wagon on a fixed wheelbase of either two or three axles, with very short side fences acting largely as guides for loading and removable bars at the ends of the vehicles.

A four-wheel wagon was rated at 10 Tons capacity, and three axles at 15 Tons.

Peter Vincent has hypothesised that this traffic would have operated in conjunction with horse box vehicles, requiring coordination in advance because the latter would often be used individually for race traffic. Photographs indicate that the trucks were stabled at major stations for quick deployment.

=== Departmental use ===
A range of flat wagons were used in and around workshops, as well as on ballast, rail and sleeper trains. Those are covered on the Departmental Wagons page.

== Narrow-gauge wagons ==
Just like the broad-gauge railways, the 2 ft 6 in (762 mm) narrow-gauge lines required open and flat wagons for general goods. Over two hundred ^{N}QR wagons were constructed between 1898 and 1914, and these were designed as open wagons with sides and ends removable for use as flat wagons if required. Notably, on the Colac to Crowes line in the 1920s, sets of three ^{N}QR wagons would be coupled to transport cut timber pilings of lengths between 75 and 78 feet.

== Liveries ==
In general, flat wagons have been painted in Victorian Railways Wagon Red livery, equivalent to British Standard BS381C 445 Venetian Red.
