= FQX =

FQX may refer to:

- FQX, a type of Bogie stock Victorian Railways flat wagon
- FQX, division code for Fengqing County, Yunnan, China
- FQX AG, Blockchain startup that employed James Freis
