= Victorian Railways departmental wagons =

Wagons used in departmental service by Victorian Railways

Departmental wagons
- Manufacturer: Victorian Railways
- Operator: Victorian Railways
- Line served: All

Specifications
- Track gauge: 5 ft 3 in (1,600 mm)

The Victorian Railways used a variety of former traffic wagons around depots and for specific construction, maintenance and similar tasks. Very few of these vehicles were specially constructed from scratch, often instead recycling components or whole wagon bodies and frames from old vehicles that had been withdrawn from normal service as life-expired or superseded by a better design.

This page covers wagons used for each of the primary tasks, with links back to the source vehicle in their appropriate page category.

== Track construction and maintenance ==
=== Ballast wagons ===
==== 1901 NN → VHWA/VZMA ====
As bogie vehicles became more popular, VR decided to expand the concept into freight transport. The ideal choice for experimentation was a little-used, but very important class of wagon, used for ballasting the track but otherwise having little to no use.

As a result, a prototype bogie ballast wagon entered service in 1901, classed NN 1. This was basically a flat wagon with raised sides along the edge, but also a small hopper with its own raised sides in the middle of the floor; this second hopper had drop-doors for increased capacity. Overall the wagon could take 26 long tons (26 t; 29 short tons) of ballast.

NN 1 was tested over a period of six years, and by 1907 it had either been modified to, or replaced by, a new design. This was on a shorter underframe, but with most of the hopper raised above floor level and considerably taller, the new type could take 30 long tons (30 t; 34 short tons) of ballast. This later design was considered more successful, and so construction started on a new batch of wagons to give NN 2 through NN 46. These wagons were shorter again, and the hopper design had changed further with vertical walls from about halfway up rather than the whole of all four sides being angled. However, these wagons could still take 30 long tons (30 t; 34 short tons) of ballast, with about 660 cubic feet of space.

The wagons were operated by being pulled along track at a very low speed, with track workers (gangers) walking alongside and using handwheels to open the discharge doors slung beneath the hoppers.

In 1924 there was a plan to convert all the hoppers to O type wagons for coal traffic, running between Yallourn and Newport Power Station. Wagons 17, 28, 36, 39 and 46 were used as hopper-donors for wagons O 1 through 5, but the project was abandoned before any more wagons could be sacrificed.

During 1950/51, one hundred welded NN hopper wagons were built to a new design. Now able to take 31 long tons (31 t; 35 short tons), thanks to advancements in construction techniques and the deletion of buffers, the wagons looked similar to their predecessors but with about three-quarters of the above-frame hopper being angled, and the remainder being vertical, rather than half-and-half. These wagons were numbered 46 - 145, repeating the first number from 'NN 46 that had been converted to O 5 a quarter of a century early.

In late 1958 or early 1959 a number of NN hoppers were stencilled "To be returned to Fyansford", because ballast supplies for the Geelong district had changed from Colac to Fyansford.

From 1960 the capacity of the vehicles was raised, by welding the central side-doors shut, and adding "hungry boards" to add about 30 cm to the top of the wagon on all sides. This was applied to most wagons, and a number received new bogies in lieu of the original plateframe style for further increased strength. All wagons numbered from 46 to 138; and 140 to 145 had three strengthening bars added on each end, extending from the top of the old hopper to nearly the end of the underframe. NN 139 had the hungry boards added, but it did not receive the strengthening bars. With this increase in capacity the wagons could now take 35 long tons (36 t; 39 short tons) of ballast.

In 1971 a number were moved across to Standard Gauge - 4, 18, 32, 44, 71, 73 and 139.

In the 1979 recoding the class was recoded to VHWA; from 1987/1988 25 were further recoded to VZMA, not to be confused with Metrail's VZMA class which was then in use for bogie transfers within workshops.

Today, a handful of wagons are still in service, operated by various heritage groups or else leased out to mainline maintenance contractors. Wagons 40, 68, 92 and 126 are held by the Victorian Goldfields Railway in Maldon; 46 is at Moorooduc with the Mornington Railway Preservation Society; 66 and 125 are with the South Gippsland Railway in Korumburra; and 67 and 108 are kept at Seymour with the Seymour Railway Heritage Centre.

==== 1910 QN → VHNA/VZNA ====
From 1910, another type of ballast wagon was constructed. Known as QN from the start and given numbers 1 through 121, the class construction continued until 1926. The wagons were initially dual-purpose, with a small hopper embedded in the centre of the floor, but with raised sides and ends and steel plates across the floor for carriage of rails and other maintenance materials. Rail carrying probably only continued until the 1950s, with the introduction of KR rail-carrying trucks. However, it was difficult to unload the wagons when being used for ballast, because the sections of the floor over the bogies were flat.

The QN series generally ran on plateframe bogies, although wagons 1 and 116 were spotted with cast bogies in the late 1960s.

Correspondence exists indicating that it was intended that later wagons, 92 and above (along with some QR wagons), would be built using underframes recycled from the NN to O conversion project with splices added to increase the length. As this conversion did not happen the wagons were built new, although some in this number range have splices evident in the sideframes.

Most vehicles ran within districts and were stencilled for the loading location, for example wagons captive to the South Gippsland region (such as QN 79) were stencilled "RETURN TO RUBY", and those in the Bendigo region (like QN 43) were marked "RETURN TO MARONG".

QN 31 was fitted with a cement mixer and associated equipment. It appears the vehicle was used for the installation of electrical overhead masts along the suburban routes, and a photo from the late 1930s shows this modification after conversion to autocouplers. By the 1970s it had been converted back to the normal type.

The 1979 recoding for the QN class was VHNA, with about half the class making the switch; 4, 8–12, 14–17, 19, 22, 24, 26, 29, 31, 33–35, 39, 40, 42, 54–56, 59, 61, 63, 67, 69, 71–74, 77, 80, 88, 91, 92, 98–100, 102, 103, 106–109, 111, 114, 116 and 119. Of these, some lasted long enough to be recoded further in 1987 to VZNA; 8, 12, 19, 71 and 107 among them.

Most of the wagons were removed from service with the advent of the VHMY/F wagons (later VZMF). However, there are a number of survivors. Wagons 22 and 79 are held by the Victorian Goldfields Railway in Maldon; 33, 39 and 100 are with the Yarra Valley Tourist Railway in Healesville; and 72 is a static exhibit at the Australian Railway Historical Society museum in Newport.

==== 1959 ON wagons ====
From 1959, 75 of the 15-ton fleet of O wagons were randomly selected for conversion for ballast train use. The vehicles had their butterfly pin-catch doors replaced with handwheel-controlled doors, allowing partial opening to control the rate of ballast discharge from a moving train. Between 1962 and 1968 some of the wagons were returned to the coal fleet, though the changes were not reversed. The remaining ON wagons were used for limestone traffic between Nowa Nowa and Maryvale.

==== 1984 VHMF/Y & VZMF later GHMY, CHMY, CHOY wagons ====
Between 1984 and 1986, thirty of the VHBY briquette wagons had been withdrawn from service and converted to ballast wagons. They were recoded to VHMY 1-30, to replace the ageing NN and QN ballast wagons. The new wagons were pneumatically discharged in lieu of the older system where the ballast doors were controlled by handbrake-style wheels mounted on the side of the wagons; this older method required track staff to walk alongside the train and control the ballast discharge procedure while in motion.

With the new system, the operator could stand on the end-platform and, via a rotating drum mechanism, control both the direction and amount of ballast, anywhere from one side of the rails to the middle or the other side.

An additional 40 new-build wagons were constructed to supplement the class from 1985, with wagon numbers 31 through 60 and 1001-1010 being built new as VHMY. The lower-numbered batch fell into use with the others in the fleet, while the 1000-series wagons were painted in Metropolitan Transit green and used as a block ballast train for the suburban network. The suburban vehicles were later modified with a cage over the operator control stands, to protect crews from overhead wiring, and were marshalled into two five-wagon sets with a green and gold-painted VZDY on either end.

In 1988 wagons 11, 18, 22, 23, 34, 36–38, 42–45, 49, 52, 54 and 56 were reclassed to VHMF; the remainder went to VZMF in 1989, and the VHMF class was relettered to this between 1990 and 1994. The new code reflected the departmental use for the wagons.

In modern times, the wagons are owned by CFCL Australia and operated under the CHOY code. Between VZMF and current, they have held codes GHMF and CHMF, the G prefix indicating Great Northern Rail Services and the C prefix for CFCLA

=== Spoil wagons ===
==== VZOA/F & VZRA ====
In 1978 E1 was recoded to HR115; in 1988 E11 became VZRA110, and around 1990, VOAA-ex-E open wagons 121, 123 and 174 were recoded to VZOF. In 1995, HR115 was recoded to VZOA95.

VZOF121 had its sides cut down to less than half of the normal height.

The VZOF wagons were used to collect waste ballast being spat out by track machine RM74. It is not clear what the purpose of the VZOA and VZRA wagons was.

==== VZOX ====
In 1997 a random assortment of open wagons were reclassed and allocated to spoil trains, collecting contaminated soil and ballast material removed from pits between platforms and other hard-to-reach areas for transport to disposal sites. It is not known how many were used, but they retained their ex-ELF/ELX/VOBX/VOCX/VOFX numbers. Known members include 7, 177, 212, 291, 344, 367, 372, 1029, 1133, 1146, 1154, 1158 and 1165.

=== Sleeper wagons ===
==== VOFY, VZOY & VZSF - Sleeper Discharge Wagons ====
In 1979 the Victorian Railways forwarded two standard ELX underframes from Bendigo to Portec, a manufacturing company in Villawood, Sydney, NSW, to be fitted with automated sleeper discharge equipment based on concepts dating back to the late 1950s. The idea was that sleepers would be loaded into the wagon, and then as a train ran along the track they would be slowly "kicked" out the side into place for future installation. This work was normally done through manual labour, which was expensive and time-consuming. On return to Victoria, the wagons were classed VOFY1 and 2.

Based on photos, it appears that 22 columns of sleepers were loaded into the wagon, and when running a hydraulic plate would push the timber sleepers out the side of the wagon before automatically resetting for the next batch. However, the project was generally considered a failure in practice; Vincent hypothesised that this was because North American sleepers (ties) were cut from softwood in a mill to uniform dimensions, while Victorian sleepers were hardwood, often cut on-site by contractors to minimum dimensions. As a result, no two sleepers were identical, and this made mechanisation difficult.

In March 1989 the wagons were reclassed to VZOY, and then in June 1990 to VZSF. They were stored in Tottenham Yard from then to 1997 and were later transferred to an unknown destination. However, rakes of the similar VZSX wagons were sighted at the North Melbourne Wagon Storage yards in 2010, pending transfer back to Tottenham Yard for scrapping.

==== QD / VZCA and VZSX - Sleeper Discharge consists ====
Using lessons learned from the VOFY type sleeper discharge wagons, consists were constructed using flat wagons and cut-down louvre vans which could be run along a line, dropping off sleepers at distinct intervals as required.

==== QD / VZCA ====
In 1965 and 1966, a pair of BB wagons had their bodies removed, and the underframes recoded QD 1 and 2 for the transport of crawler cranes operated by the Way and Works branch. A further two QDs, 3 and 4, were sourced from withdrawn VVEY guards vans 2 and 8 in 1985, though these had thinner frames. The decks were fitted with rails at one end with a narrow-gauge forklift type machine stabled on the deck. These rails would be connected to the VZSX sleeper wagons, and the forklift could run up and down the train length unloading sleepers as required. Sleepers were lifted and ejected over the top sides of the wagon, rather than through gaps along the sides.

==== VZSX ====
In 1987/88, eleven former VLCX louvre vans were stripped down to underframes at various railway workshops around Victoria, and refitted with a superstructure similar to that used on the VOFY wagons but without plated sides, to ease unloading. Rails were provided along the frame of the wagon to permit the VZCA dedicated forklifts to run along the train for sleeper unloading. These vehicles were coded VZSX 1 through 11. Between these and the 28 VBBX cars cut down for sleeper discharge use, the expectation was that the last of the VOWA open wagons could be retired.

A further set of ten wagons had ISO container ports fitted for two 20 ft containers, and were supplied with two each VWS-classed ISO compatible sleeper storage frames. Rails were built in to the container frames, rather than attached directly to the wagons. This type of VZSX was numbered 100 to 109, and proved to be more successful as a further ten were converted in 1989, and eight more in 1991.

Rakes of VZSX wagons and their respective VZCA wagons were sighted at the North Melbourne Wagon Storage yards in 2010, pending transfer to Tottenham Yard for scrapping.

==== VZTX ====
Between 1987 and 1989, twenty former boxvans were cut down and recycled as sleeper-carrying wagons, both the normal type and longer sleepers ("timbers") for junction work. They were built with three trays, so one stack of sleepers could be held at the handbrake end, and two stacks at the other end.

==== GR 1 - Sleeper Transport ====
In 1984, GY wagon 308 had its sides removed and stanchions fitted, giving it a resemblance to the timber-carrying series of wagons. It was an experiment in the transport of stacks of sleepers, but by 1988 it was taken off register.

==== VFNX - Concrete Sleeper Transport ====
In the early 1990s at least 28 newsprint wagons had the canvas equipment removed, and operated in service as regular flat wagons with taller than normal bulkheads. These were renumbered by adding 100 to their previous identities, and the primary traffic was concrete sleepers from Stirling North in South Australia to various locations between Melbourne and Adelaide for the gauge-conversion project.

=== Rail wagons ===
==== KR ====
From 1959 a batch of scrapped I/IA wagon underframes were recycled as flat wagons and coded KR for the transport of long sections of welded rails. Rakes of up to thirteen wagons were semi-permanently coupled by removing the lift-pin mechanism from the automatic couplers. Most were simple flat deck wagons with two pairs of removable stanchions to keep the load in place, but some had small storage bins across their width and a third of their length for assorted track-laying equipment, while others were fitted with small cranes. Together, a set of thirteen KR wagons could carry rails in lengths of 270 feet.

The four-wheeled wagons were numbered 124-189 and 211-318 for a total of 174 units, plus 191-210 which were bogie wagons.

==== VFRX / VFRY / VZRX / VZRY / VZRF ====
In 1984 a batch of 22 75ft flat wagons were provided with fittings to support transport of long welded rail lengths. Six of these were provided with bulkheads about six feet from one end, while the remaining 16 were essentially flat wagons with bolsters and stanchions. The group was numbered 301–322, with plain wagons coded VFRX (301, 307, 309–322) and bulkhead wagons VFRY (302-306 & 308). Shortly after entry to service, VFRX314 was altered to VFRY314.

In 1990 these codes were changed from VFRX to VZRX, and VFRY to VZRY, respectively.

== Service stock ==
=== HH breakdown train support ===
From 1899 a fleet of six massive OO open wagons entered service for use on heavy coal trains from the Gippsland region. They were found to be a failure in service, so in 1912 the sides were extended and corrugated roofs were fitted, and the vans were reallocated for use as breakdown vans, housing equipment used to recover from derailments and supplies for the steam cranes. They were joined in the mid-1930s by six members of the former TT insulated range, and allocated to depots around Victoria, such as North Melbourne, Geelong, Ballarat, Ararat, Dimboola, Bendigo, Seymour, Benalla and Traralgon.

In 1957 they were recoded HH, with the ex-open wagons being numbered 1-6 and the ex-insulated wagons 7–12. HH12, ex TT21, was relettered to HD237 in 1974, indicating a more generic use for the vehicle; and in 1977 vans HH3 and HH6 were replaced with ex-louvre vans VF18 and VF5 respectively, which inherited the HH identities.

The vans were withdrawn gradually from the late 1970s as road access to derailment sites became more practical. None of the vans were recoded to the four-letter Railways of Australia lettering system; though if they had been, it is a fair guess that the code could have become something like VZBA to indicate Victorian, Departmental, Boxvan, Low Speed use.

=== VHCF weighbridge test wagons ===
In late 2001, ten cement hoppers from the J/CJ series of wagons were removed from storage and loaded with various quantities of ballast were loaded into each wagon to give a known total weight of up to 100 tonnes. They were then railed to the Kensington flour mill siding to test that weighbridge. Later, they were recoded VHCF, shifted on to standard gauge, and used to test in-line train weighing systems on the standard gauge line between Newport and North Geelong.

Wagons converted were VHCA 2, 3, 10, 12, 29, 39, 43–44, 91 and 96.

By May 2003 the fleet had been placed back onto broad gauge bogies and stored in the Tottenham Yard area.

=== Fire management and Weedex ===
==== HD / VZAA Fire Attack ====
In 1968, box van BA8 had the body removed and scrapped, and the underframe, recoded as HD 230, was fitted out as a world-first "Fire Attack" wagon. It was coupled to tank wagons which were otherwise used on the Weedex train. The design was later replicated in the United States, and plans were provided to Romania and France. The vehicle code changed to VZAA 230 in 1988.

The fire attack train was designed to handle small incidents, including smouldering sleepers, plant material, bridges and telegraph poles. For this purpose, the design included water sprays alongside the wagon underframe. Power was provided by a Volkswagen Magius water pump, which supplied up to 200 gallons of water or foam, at 100 pounds per square inch, to each of the two, five-person outlets. Each water cannon could strike fire spots at a distance of up to 100 feet with ease. A generator also supplied floodlighting and spotlights for operations overnight. Both 3/4" and 2.5" diameter fire hoses were supplied to attack small fires at a distance away from the track, along with taps to refill knapsacks filled with water for on-foot firefighting.

Shortly after entering service, side panels were added to protect crews who had previously been burned by radiant heat.

Two photos of the Fire Attack train, in use, were printed on the rear of the February 1998 Newsrail, dated 7 January that year. The train consisted of locomotive A66, the VZAA wagon, four tanks and a steel guards' van. It was required to assist in fire management in the Alpine National Park bushfires, where a shortage of water was dampening efforts. The train had been scheduled to run to Bairnsdale, but due to the condition of the track and bridges beyond there, it was stopped at Sale. This may have been the last time the train was deployed, given that all future sightings of the vehicle and consist were at North Melbourne, with consist VZAA, then four VZVA tankers 2, 9, 5 and 7. As at 2010, it was expected that the assorted vehicles stabled in the Wagon Storage sidings at North Melbourne were planned to be transferred to Tottenham Yard then scrapped; it is not clear whether this included VZAA 230.

At least one model of the vehicle has been scratch-built.

==== WX / VZVA tank wagons ====
In 1955, six E type open wagons were cut down to underframes only, and had 7,400 single-compartment tanks fitted for the purpose of transporting weed-killer chemicals around the state. The tank wagons were coupled to a crew car and a spray car, which misted the track and surrounding areas with chemicals on an as-required basis, on special trains scheduled to operate at low speeds. The tank wagons were coded WX, and joined by another three ex-E wagons as WX7-9 in 1957.

In 1963 the code was changed to WA, as the "X" suffix was only to be used on gauge-convertible rolling stock. The E type underframes were swapped out for ELX-type frames in 1977, and the wagons were recoded to VZVA from 1985.

Each tank wagon was fitted with pipes permitting chemicals or water to be drawn through the consist to the weedex spray or fire attack vehicle at one end.

==== VZVA storage vans ====
In addition to the tank wagons, the code VZVA was also used to describe former vans VF12 and VF13, which were allocated to the Weedex train for the storage of chemicals and equipment. These were recoded as HD 248 and 247, respectively, in 1977, then VZVA circa 1985.

=== Safety wagons ===
Safety wagons were used to keep locomotives and other ignition sources away from fuels or powders that could be ignited, by stray sparks or static discharge. Initially any random assortment of vehicles was used, but later officially allocated safety wagons were earmarked for specific duties.

Yards where dangerous goods were handled were often marked with signs to the effect of "ENGINES MUST NOT PASS THIS POINT"; Victorian Railways locomotives were used to deliver wagons up to that point, where the engine would be uncoupled and any further shunting performed either with animals or machines with suitable safety devices fitted. In later years, safety wagons were provided to allow the locomotive to perform limited shunting without actually travelling beyond the limit.

Safety wagons were also used either side of oil and explosives vehicles in transit, to reduce the risk of stray sparks from steam locomotives, and between or either end of overlength loads to provide safe coupling points.

The 1953 General Appendix states that wagons loaded with ignitable goods must be marshalled as close to the front of the train as possible; however, whether loaded or not, a minimum of three other wagons must intervene between the oil or explosives truck(s) and a locomotive, passenger vehicle or other flammable or explosive wagon load, such as hay or detonators respectively. Furthermore, wagons loaded with explosives could not be coupled together, requiring one intermediate safety wagon or three if above a given threshold.

For pintsch gas, the minimum gap was two vehicles, and the wagon was to be placed near the rear of the train. If that train was running in the Up direction then the gas wagon was to be marshalled adjacent to perishable goods, or if the train was a mixed consist then it was to be kept as close as practicable to the rear of the consist, while maintaining two vehicle lengths between it and the passenger carriages.

In the event that loaded explosives wagons needed to be stabled in unattended railway yards, and did not have a functioning hand brake, any ordinary wagon was required to be coupled with its hand brake applied in lieu; or failing that, the wagon was to be chained and locked to the rails through the wheel spokes.

These rules evolved over time to permit working of block train consists, where a string of oil-carrying wagons would be coupled together with a single bogie safety wagon at either end.

==== VKKF ====
In 1994, VFKX40 was recoded to VKKF, and used as a safety wagon in the Corio area.

==== VZKF ====
In 1997, flat wagons VFKX14 and VQGX14 was recoded to VZKF. The former was allocated to Geelong car sidings, to help propel carriages through the wash, while the latter was used at the Shell sidings in Corio to keep locomotives away from the oil loading points.

== Internal and Inter-Workshops stock ==
HR no's.	HZx (fixed) no's	VZxx (bogie) no's	Traffic
20x G/GY wagons; HR66, 69, 80-83, 105, 107-108.	HZB 280–309		Brake blocks
		VZBF 1-3	Brake blocks
2, 28, 30	HZC 250-252		Auto couplers
12, 15	HZE 230-231		Locomotive engine blocks
		VFWY 1 / VZLY80 / VZLF80	Locomotive engine blocks
31	HZJ 270		Lifting jacks; sighted in bogie transport per HZM in 1985.
		VZLA	Bogies for locomotives
GY5207, HR78, HR148 (Note: HZL216 was a bogie wagon, recoded to VZLA81 around 1986.)	HZL 210-216		Couplers, yokes and shanks
?, ?, 38, 99, 110, 120, 146, 154, 155, G3736	HZM 220–229	VZMA 90-100	Bogies for suburban stock, including disc brake bogies for Comeng trains from Newport Workshops to the Dandenong rolling stock factory.
	HZP		Pantographs
	HZR 340–341, 343, 346		Rubbish
	HZT		Traction motors
	HZV 320–327, 329–330, 332-338		Workshop stores transport
	HZS		Locomotive sand
		VZGX 1, 4, 17	Locomotive sand
40-58, 70-79		VZFA/F/X 1, 2, 40-58 & VZLA 70-79	Bogies for freight rolling stock
	HZW 201, 203-209	VZWA	Wheelsets

After vehicles were marked "off register" from normal use, they were occasionally repurposed as departmental stock for shunting parts and equipment within larger depot areas and classed HD or, form 1953, HR. The vast majority were sourced from open wagons, but a handful had previously been used as flat wagons or other types. As wagons wore out they were generally replaced with a new vehicle and the number would be recycled separately. In 1962 older bogie wagons started to be incorporated into the HD and HR series with no differentiation, as depot staff would likely be familiar with each vehicle in their area and the numbers were primarily allocated for book-keeping purposes. From 1985 both classes were abolished; fixed-axle wagons were recoded to "HZx", the last character indicating the specific purpose of each vehicle, while bogie wagons were given codes in the VZxx series indicating Victorian Departmental stock, the third letter for purpose and as required by ROA codes, the fourth indicating bogie type.

=== HR, HZx, VZxx variants ===
I wagon 8855 had been converted to HR58 in 1956, and withdrawn from that service in 1979. However, it was deemed worth keeping, and was renamed as Jolimont 1 for brake block transport only, within the Jolimont Yard area. It was eventually scrapped in 1998 at Newport Workshops.

In late 1984 six GY wagons had their bodies cut off, and 20 ft ISO container ports added, because the ISO standard container base was used as a framework when shipping new Link Hoffman Busch (LHB) bogies for the Comeng suburban trains then under construction. In their new form the wagons were initially identified as KSQ 1–6, although within a few weeks this had changed to HR 96, 99, 154, 110, 120 and 155 respectively. It is not clear whether they ever ran as KSQ. In 1985 they were reclassed HZM with a new number series, and they were withdrawn around 1988.

=== VFWY / VZLY - Diesel Engine Block Transport ===
When louvre van VLEX817 was scrapped in 1983, its underframe was retained as a one-off flat wagon used for returning B Class engine blocks from South Australia to Melbourne, as they were removed from engines being rebuilt as A Class. The underframe was classed VFWY1, though in the middle of 1985 this had changed to VZLY80 and by 1987 it had changed again to VZLF80.

=== VZBF - Brake Block Transport Wagon ===
In 1991 three former boxvans 56, 2 and 13 were converted to brake block storage vehicles, coded VZBF 1–3. The sides and one end were cut down to only one louvre height, roughly 2 ft above underframe level, and the remaining end about twice that height to carry the ratchet handbrake equipment. The doorways were plated over, and a triangular prism was constructed in the centre so that brake blocks around yards could be tossed into the wagon and would settle over the bogies, without having to be carefully placed. They had a nominal capacity of 20 tons, though that would add to well over a thousand cast-iron brake blocks.

=== VZFA / VZFF / VZFX / VZLA - Freight Bogie Transport Wagon ===
HR wagons numbered 40 to 58 and 70 to 79 were constructed using random underframes, mostly but not exclusively sourced from E type open wagons. They were used for the transport of bogies between depots, and could be loaded with four bogies along the deck or five mounted transverse depending on the individual wagon. All were classed to VZFA in 1985. In 1989, 42 was reclassed VZFX for standard gauge runs and 40, 53, 55 and 57 were reclassed VZFF for inclusion in higher-speed freight schedules.

=== VZMA - Suburban Bogie Transport Wagon ===
For the transport of suburban bogies, eleven E wagons were converted to HR wagons 90 through 100 in the 1970s. Some were stripped down to underframes, such as 92, while others, i.e. 100, retained their sides and ends. All had brackets along the floor to keep bogies in place. In 1985 they were recoded to VZMA, despite this being the same code used on V/Line's ex-NN/VHWA ballast wagons.

=== VZGX - Locomotive sand ===
In 1990 three of the VPFX flour hoppers, 1, 4 and 17, were reclassified VZGX and replaced HD four-wheel locomotive sand transport vehicles, to deliver dried sand to various locomotive depots around the state. While they retained the four drums, only the outer two were used for sand because of the difference in weight.

=== VZWA - Wheel and axle transport ===
In the late 1970s through early 1980s, 34 former E type wagons were cut down and converted to axle transport. Trays were fitted in two rows with alternating slots cut in for wheels, allowing 19 axles to be loaded per wagon.

=== VZZF - Bogie frame transport ===
In 1993 a pair of former VLEX louvre vans were cut down and fitted with raised timber beams to support bogie frames, when being transported without axles in place. They were reclassed VZZF 1-2.

=== VZAF / VZEA boxvans ===
An assortment of ex-V/VP and ex-BB/BP vehicles were reclassed to VZAF in 1985, and allocated to track maintenance gangs for equipment storage and transfer. Numbers were retained through all reclassifications, and the final assortment included former boxvans 3, 15, 23, 28, 31, 32, 47, 50, 63 and 70, and former louvre vans 54, 113, 123 and 141.

VF79 was recoded to VZEA226, although it is not clear why the different code was implemented.

=== VZOA - Short, drop-door open wagon ===
In 1990, VOWA231 ex QR231 was recoded to VZOA231.

=== VZJF - Long open wagon ===
Around 1994, wagon VOJF20 was recoded VZJF. Traffic unknown.

== Narrow gauge wagons ==
Generally speaking, ^{N}QR wagons were modified as required for use on maintenance trains. In more recent times, Puffing Billy has utilised former louvre and cattle vans as travelling equipment storage, and has also acquired a pair of ex-Tasmanian hopper wagons for use on ballast trains; these have been reclassed as ^{N}N^{N}. Details are covered on the appropriate page.

== Liveries ==
In general, these wagons have been painted in Victorian Railways Wagon Red livery; well faded and with instructions stencilled on wagon sides or ends as required.
