= Sunshine Biscuits (Australia) =

Australian food company

Sunshine Australia
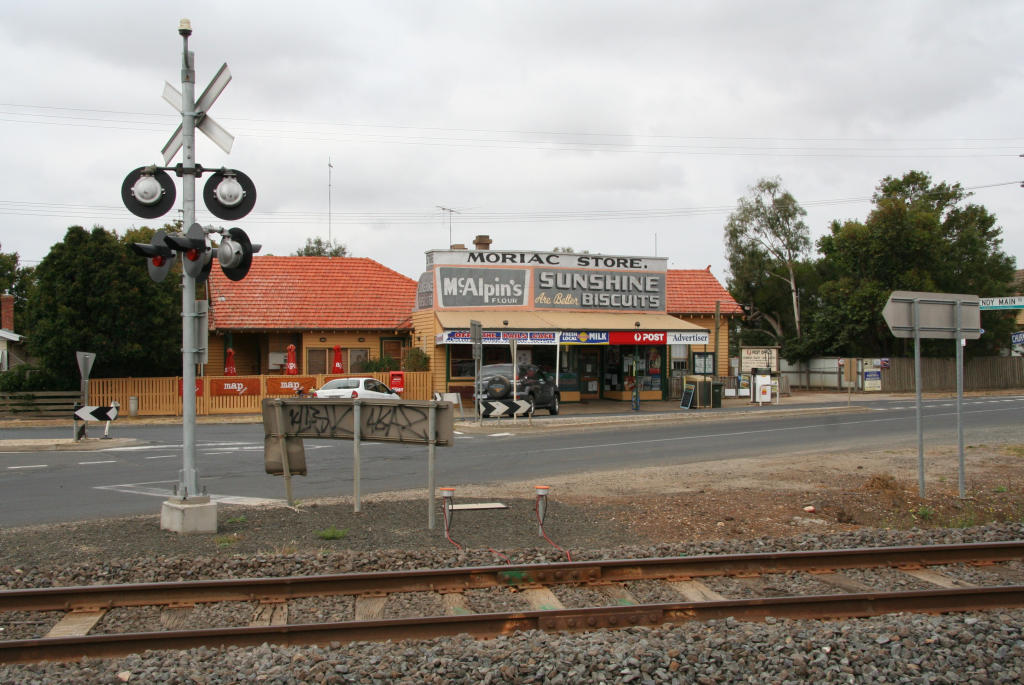
- Sunshine Biscuits signage on the general store in Moriac, Victoria.
- Formerly: Sunshine Biscuit and Confectionery Pty Ltd.; Sunshine Biscuits (1962-1972
- Founded: 1854; 172 years ago
- Founder: James Long
- Defunct: 1991
- Headquarters: Albert Park, Victoria, Australia
- Parent: William Crosby and Co. (from 1917)

Sunshine Biscuits was an Australian producer of biscuits in Albert Park, Victoria. The company manufactured high class biscuits and confectionery.

== History ==
Sunshine Biscuits was founded in 1854 by James Long. In 1917, it was acquired by William Crosby and Co. After Long's death, his son, T.P. Long, took over and in 1921, its name formally changed to the Sunshine Biscuit and Confectionery Pty Ltd.

The company's factory was damaged by fire twice. The first one on March 7, 1923, and the second one on January 22, 1939, which was a "deliberately lit fire." Sunshine Biscuit Co. merged with George Farmer and Co. to form the Ballarat Products Company in In 1947.

The company changed their name to Sunshine Biscuits in 1962, then to Sunshine Australia in 1972.

It ceased operations in 1991. In the years before it closed down the company was making McVitie biscuits at its Ballarat factory under a licensing agreement with United Biscuits.
