= Victorian Railways open wagons =

Open Wagons
- Manufacturer: Victorian Railways
- Constructed: From 1859
- Number built: >15000
- Operator: Victorian Railways
- Line served: All

Specifications
- Track gauge: 5 ft 3 in (1,600 mm)

The Victorian Railways used a variety of both 4-wheel and bogie open wagons for the transport of a wide range of loads.

== History ==
The first open wagons were 4-wheel wagons of all-wooden construction, had no brakes and could carry up to 8 long tons (8.1 t; 9.0 short tons). Westinghouse brakes were added from 1891, with most vehicles modified by 1905. The addition of brakes, and the use of steel frames, meant that, by 1928, vehicles with 27-long-ton (27.4 t; 30.2-short-ton) capacity had been developed.

The first bogie open wagons were built in 1880 and had a capacity of 20 long tons (20.3 t; 22.4 short tons). Bogie vehicles were in a minority until their widespread introduction in the mid-1950s with the construction associated with Operation Phoenix.

== Four-Wheel Wagons ==
=== I Series wagons ===
The first I wagon was built in 1859. It was of all-wooden construction and could carry a load of 8 long tons (8.1 t; 9.0 short tons). In 1902, the first 15-long-ton (15.2 t; 16.8-short-ton) I wagons were built and got the nickname 'Tommy Bent' Wagon. From 1907 to 1926, the standard I wagon was built which could also carry 15 long tons (15.2 t; 16.8 short tons). These wagons had a longer wheelbase than the earlier 15-ton wagons.

==== IA - Four-wheel Open Wagon ====
IA wagons were almost identical to the steel 15-long-ton (15.2 t; 16.8-short-ton) I wagons. The only difference was they were recoded to allow for dual rating of 11 and 15 long tons (11.2 and 15.2 t; 12.3 and 16.8 short tons). That allowed loads of up to 11 long tons (11.2 t; 12.3 short tons) being charged at the 11-ton rate and loads from 11 to 15 tons at the 15-ton rate. The recoding started in early 1929 and continued while IB wagons were being scrapped.

==== IB - 11-ton Open Wagon ====
In 1929, all I's with a load of less than 15 long tons (15.2 t; 16.8 short tons) were re-coded IB, to separate the lower-capacity wagons from the newer higher-capacity wagons.

==== IC - Fixed-wheel Tippler Wagons ====
From 1954, approximately 350 I/IA wagons were converted for tippler traffic, to carry coal between Yallourn and Newport Power Station. Later tippler traffic was between the Maddingley Mine at Bacchus Marsh and the APM paper mill at Fairfield. The wagons were modified by removing the doors and replacing them with a steel plate welded into place.

==== ID - (ex D&MR Co) Open Wagon ====
Included in the Deniliquin & Moama Railway Company stock acquired by the VR in 1923 were fixed wheel open wagons similar in design to 'standard' 10 ton capacity I wagons, which the VR had been building through the 1880s. These wagons were classed ID by the VR and numbered 31, and 33 to 50. Similarly 46 to 50 ID were built at Newport Workshops in 1922 for the D&MR; they were standard pattern I wagons as built at that period and were used to replace accident damaged I wagons in the VR fleet, some surviving until the 1970s.

==== IG / IX Fixed-wheel Open Wagon ====
Drop-sided wagon

==== IO - Fixed-wheel Open Wagon ====
In 1948, a non bulk-proofed version of the standard GY wagon was placed into service; these vehicles were coded IY. Since there were already wagons coded IY (rivetted) in service, these vehicles were recoded IO; during August/September of 1948, wagons 15870 to 15878, 15893, and 15895 IY were so treated. Wagons 15896 to 15957 IO were built new and placed into service between July and November of 1948. Due to reporting problems, since IO could be mistaken for 10 (ten), these wagons were again recoded - this time to HY. Wagons issued to service after 26 November 1948 were all coded HY from new, while recoding to HY of previous IY/IO wagons of this type took place during the last months of 1948.

==== IS & IT - Fixed-wheel Open Wagon ====
They were converted from other classes for timber traffic.

==== IY - Fixed-wheel Open Wagon ====
They were the same as the standard I wagon, but had a stronger underframe, allowing them to carry a load of up to 22 long tons (22.4 t; 24.6 short tons). 350 of these wagons were made between 1926 and 1927.

==== IZ - Fixed-wheel Open Wagon ====
IZ wagons were introduced to service in 1928, and continued to be built until 1936. It is likely that the design was inspired by the bogie E wagons of 1925, though door widths and side heights are slightly different. Originally constructed with a rivetted body, outside sill underframe and pressed body panels, later wagons had inside sills, welded type with sheet panels.

As introduced, their capacity was 25 tons, however the second batch entered service as dual capacity "16/25" ton wagons. From 1932 the capacity was lifted to 27 ton, and remained so until the 1960s, despite increases of one ton for most other classes when the buffers were removed.

600 IZ was issued to traffic on 28/3/1931, two months after the last rivetted wagon, and was at the time billed as the "First All-Welded Four Wheel Open Wagon" in the world. This vehicle appears not to have been placed into general traffic; in 1933 it was mentioned in correspondence as running between Newport Workshops and Bendigo in workshops traffic.

Further construction of IZ wagons continued to 1935, when wagons 911 to 999 IZ were placed in traffic, most being listed as "bulk grain". Within three months, the first _GZ_wagons were issued to service, numbers 1000 and 1001. These "bulk wheat" IZ wagons were recoded to GZ, the GZ wagons eventually occupying numbers 911 to 1030, and 1101 to 2000. This left the IZ number block as 1 to 910, and 1031 to 1100.

By about 1954 there were sufficient GY wagons in service to replace both GZ wagons and the G grain trucks ex I wagons. GZ wagons were progressively recoded to IZ from about 1956, although some GZ's remained in service until 1965. With the inclusion of GZ conversions the IZ number block became 1 to 2000.

In the late 1950s, some attempt was made to rebuild the early riveted bodies. The welded HY body design was used and the code for these wagons became HZ.

With derailment problems in 1963/1964, the IZ wagons were modified and derated to 22 tons capacity, and coded RY.

=== G Series Wagons ===
In 1935, the VR started transporting bulk grain. To cater for that traffic, 200 standard I wagons were modified with grain-proof seals and were coded G.

In about 1956, due to the number of GY wagons, G wagons were no longer required for bulk grain and were reclassified to I or IA.

==== GY - Fixed-wheel Open Wagon ====
In 1939, the VR produced the first of about 5000 wagons for carting bulk grain. Construction was carried out regularly from 1939 to 1958, with the majority being built in the late 1940s and early 1950s. The wagons could be seen in long rakes of up to 73. When not required for grain transport, the GY could be used for general goods service.

In the early 80s the Australian Railways Union placed a ban on the withdrawal and scrapping of the V/Line open wagon fleet due to concerns about the grain capacity of the system, and for most of 1986 about 3,000 wagons were stabled in sidings all around the state to keep them out of the way while new GJF bogie grain hoppers were built. Each new hopper replaced seven open wagons, by combining the increased capacity, decreased weight, and faster loading, unloading and run times made possible with the modern design. Nearly 350 wagons, comprised mostly of GY, L sheep and M cattle wagons, had been held at the former military siding Dysart, south of Seymour railway station.

By April 1987 disposal of 3,500 fixed-wheel wagons had progressed substantially, many of those being GY class though exact proportions are not known. Simsmetal had scrapped over a thousand wagons around the state, with progress being made on another 800 or so and a final estimate of 2,200 wagons to be scrapped by that contractor alone. A further 400 wagons were in the process of being scrapped at Bendigo Workshops, 183 at Woodend, 150 at Benalla (including some bogie box and louvre vans), 100 at Wallan, and around 450-500 wagons at Tottenham Yard. Of the total fleet of around 6,000 GY wagons, around 1,300 were converted to non-grain traffic and recoded as "G", for use in general goods service for shipments like fertiliser, timber and briquettes, and another 800 or so were converted to GH hopper wagons as a stopgap to handle grain traffic on light lines, like Tocumwal, that could not handle the axle loads of heavier bogie grain hoppers. The 1986-1987 grain season was the first time that export grain traffic from Victoria did not include the use of GY wagons.

It was also expected that the GH fleet would soon be rendered obsolete in 1988 due to bridge upgrades and line closures, plus the anticipated delivery of a further 100 VHGY bogie hopper wagons.

==== GZ - Bulk Grain Wagon ====
These were a grain-proofed version of the IZ wagon.

==== HY - Fixed-wheel Open Wagon ====
HY wagons were introduced in 1948 as a general service wagon, identical in design to the GY, except that they did not have the grain proof seals around the doors and so were not suitable for the carriage of bulk grain. Originally introduced as IY/IO wagons, these classifications caused some confusion so the wagon class was changed to HY. The number group started at 15870, which was a continuation of the I wagon number block. Traffic problems became apparent when they were mistaken for GY wagons, and loaded with bulk grain. To avoid mistaken identity, the GY, GZ, and G bulk grain wagons received diagonal yellow stripes painted on one corner of each side (oxide red stripes for wagons later painted yellow). Wagon construction continued until 1958, in the 15870 to 17030 number block; these were converted to bulk traffic GY wagons from 1961, retaining their HY number. Older IZ type wagons were rebuilt with these style bodies from 1959, and recoded to HY from 1961. Rebuilding continued until 1965, with the wagons being issued to service as HY; these HY wagons were in the low number group (less than 15870). From 1966 to 1968, the VR modified most of this group to GY standard, (the code and number both changing) becoming 911 to 1160 GY. Other wagons were placed into the RY group.

==== HZ - Fixed-wheel Open Wagon ====
The first 1 HZ was convertedfrom horsebox 25 F during December 1954, to provide a weed spraying van for the Weedex train. It was fitted with pumping gear and spray nozzles to spray along each side of the track, and was coupled to tank wagons filled with herbicide. It was recoded to 1 WZ in 1959 in order to clear the HZ code for a new type open wagon. From 1959 to 1961, seventy IZ wagons were rebuilt with welded bodies using components from the HY (non grain-proof GY) design. These modified open wagons were recoded to HZ. Between 1961 and 1966, these wagons were progressively recoded to HY. The numbers for the HZ group were between 6 and 804. As HY wagons, they were converted to GY wagons in the 1966/67 program. These wagons were incorporated into the GY number block 911 to 1160 along with other IZ conversions.

=== Other Four-wheel Open Wagons ===
==== RY - Fixed-wheel Open Wagon ====
During 1963 and 1964, the VR encountered an unusually high number of derailments, with as many as derailment per day was being recorded (though many of thsee events were very minor). One of the derailment causes was found to be the "W" guards of IZ, GZ, and HZ type (27 ton capacity) wagons, which were found to be cracking where they were rivetted to the underframe. To rectify the problem, the "W" guards were replaced and the wagons derated to 22 ton capacity. These wagon classes were recoded to RY, with the original numbers kept.

The combined IZ, GZ, and HZ number group was 1 to 2000. With conversions to other wagons from the mid 1950s and scrappings due to derailments, there were many gaps in the number group; the lowest numbered RY was 2.

The conversion of all the wagons took about four years; while this was progressing, the VR began converting the outside sill versions of IZ, HZ, HY, and RY wagons to GY standard. Apart from the rebuilt wagons coded HY, the IZ, HZ, and RY conversions involved replacing the old rivetted superstructure with a welded one.

Notably, one wagon (600 RY, built in 1931 as 600 IZ) was billed as first "all welded" in the world. However, since welded bogie wagons were built in part from the late 1920s in North America (although in Europe and the UK, wood and rivet construction were normal), perhaps "all welded four wheel wagon" was more applicable.

"Outside sill" wagons were numbered in the range 1 to 599, and 761 to 810. Other wagons had standard channel underframe of either wheel (transverse) or lever handbrake.

== Bogie wagons ==
Over time, four-wheeled wagons became obsolete. Bogie vehicles could run at higher speeds and, with more wheels, had a better axle-loading, meaning that they could carry a larger load. A number of classes of bogie vehicles were constructed.

=== E Series wagons ===
In 1925, the South Australian Railways placed a large order for rolling stock with the American Car and Foundry Company, USA. The Victorian Railways elected to tack on to that order two louvre vans, two flat cars and two open wagons, becoming 1 and 2 V, S and E respectively; the equivalents of the South Australian Railways M, Fb and O types, along with a class of 12 J-type hopper wagons.

==== E ====
They were assembled at Newport Workshops, using supplied components including pressed steel ends, sides and doors, for a capacity of 44 long tons (44.7 t; 49.3 short tons). As the tests in both states proved successful, the Victorian Railways constructed a further 200 E-type open wagons between 1927 and 1928.

From 1941, 100 randomly selected E-type wagons had their sides, doors and ends removed for conversion to S-type flat wagons. The vehicles retained their numbers except for wagon E1, which became S203 because the original S1 was still in service. Following World War II, 20 of those wagons were further converted to tank wagons. Another 14 were restored to open-wagon format before later being converted to tank wagons, while 38 were converted directly from open to tank with no intermediate flat-wagon stage.

In the late 1950s the riveted bodies of the E wagons were wearing out, so welded components similar to those used in the ELX program were used as required.

Some wagons were specifically allocated to State Electricity Commission traffic, running wooden power poles from the Brooklyn depot to various country depots. The wagons had their doors removed and bolsters fitted to the floors to make removal of the poles easier.

==== EF/EX ====
13 wagons were reclassed EF and fitted with roller bearing bogies and grade control equipment for use on the new standard gauge interstate line. The vehicles retained their E wagon numbers, but when made suitable for bogie exchange, they were recoded to EX and renumbered in the new series 1-13.

==== VOAA/VOAF ====
15 wagons made it to the 1979 recoding, becoming VOAA or VOAF, depending on the bogies fitted.

=== ELX Series wagons ===
==== ELX, VOBX, VOCX Wagons ====
The ELX is most easily distinguished from the similar E wagon by the fact that the ELX has four panels between its side doors, whereas the E wagon only has two.

==== ESX, VODX - Slab Steel ====
Twenty-six were built between 1964 and 1965, numbered 1 to 26. Primarily designed for transporting sheet steel, they also saw use as general wagons due to the design being very similar to the ELX Wagon. In the late 1960s, they were used for transporting pipes for pipeline projects in Victoria.

=== O^{O} wagons ===
The Victorian Railways' second foray into bogie open wagons, these six vehicles were very different from their R-type predecessors. The new wagons were massive, being billed as "the largest bogie vehicle '..in the British Empire..'."

The first unit entered service in 1899 as a trial of the new design, featuring plate frame sides and ends, two sets of double-doors per side, trap doors in the undercarriage and a 45-long-ton (45.7 t; 50.4-short-ton) loading capacity - nearly twice the nearest competitor. Six-wheel plateframe bogies were fitted. The wagon was supposed to be used on locomotive coal traffic from South Gippsland to Melbourne, but could not be easily unloaded. Despite that, a further five units - O^{O}2 through O^{O}6 - entered service in 1902. Peter Vincent believes that all six had been built as a batch, but after the failure of the first vehicle the remainder were kept in storage until they could be made useful.

In addition to unloading problems, the wagons were difficult to manoeuvre around the yards of the coal mines in the South Gippsland region. At the turn of the century, the Korumburra, Jumbunna and Outtrim mines were producing over 4,000 tons of coal per week, equivalent to 45-65 wagon loads per day (excluding Sundays). Despite that, no single customer required 45 long tons (45.7 t; 50.4 short tons) of coal in one delivery or had the facilities to manage that volume. At least three more of the O^{O} trucks made it to the mines, but stayed empty in sidings because the managers "flatly refused" to load them. Eventually the Minister had to order the wagons back to Melbourne, empty, for storage.

A pair of photographs show O^{O}1 downrated to 40 long tons (40.6 t; 44.8 short tons) and carrying 360 bags of wheat, though that was most likely a trial rather than a proper allocation.

In 1912, the vehicles found a new purpose, being fitted with extended sides and a new corrugated roof. They were then allocated to breakdown trains around the state as mobile tool kits, to store much of the necessary equipment for re-railing of locomotives and other rolling stock. In that service, the wagons, now "vans", replaced older S-type breakdown vans which had initially entered service as boxcars in 1880. The vans kept their O^{O} code until 1956, when they were re-classed HH.

=== QR, VOWA & VZWA - Drop Door Open Wagon ===
QR, VOWA/VZWA
- Number built: 377 short & 30 long
- Number preserved: 17 short & nil long
- Number scrapped: 360 short & 30 long
- Capacity: 26 LT 0 cwt 0 qtr (26.42 t) diamond-frame bogies

Specifications
- Car body construction: Timber planks
- Car length: 38 ft 5 1/2 in (11.72 m) over pulling lines (short type)
- Width: 8 ft 5 1/2 in (2.58 m)
- Height: 6 ft 11 in (2.11 m)
- Wheel diameter: 33 in (0.84 m)
- Maximum speed: 45 mph (72 km/h)
- Weight: 13 LT 10 cwt 0 qtr (13.72 t)
- Axle load: 3 LT 7 cwt 2 qtr (3.43 t) unloaded
- Power supply: Axle-mounted generators
- Bogies: 23 ft 0 3/4 in (7.03 m) centres (Types 1 & 2)
- Braking system: Westinghouse
- Coupling system: screw, later autocouplers
- Track gauge: 5 ft 3 in (1,600 mm)

The design of the QR was effectively a compromise between the existing designs for medium-sized flat wagons (Q) and medium-sized open wagons (R). The ends were fixed, but the three drop-doors on each side could be removed if required.

The first vehicle entered service in March 1889, and was deemed successful. From July 1890 to May 1892, 150 wagons were constructed on behalf of the Victorian Railways by Wright & Edwards, at their Braybrook workshops, followed by QR152-201 in 1892, constructed by the Railways rather than being contracted out. The initial wagons were built with swing-motion, diamond-frame bogies. The underframe used both steel and wooden components, and was reinforced with truss rods. The final result provided a wagon with capacity of 26 LT 0 cwt 0 qtr (26.42 t).

The design was slightly altered in 1912 and 175 wagons entered service in five batches up to February 1924, when QR376 entered service. The vehicles were initially distinctive in their use of plate-frame bogies (otherwise used on heavier flat wagons, like the QB series), and were rated at 30 LT 0 cwt 0 qtr (30.48 t) load.

The 1919 General Appendix indicated that only QR trucks with strengthened draw gear (no's 202-351) were permitted on express trains, and even then they had to be attached immediately behind the engine. Their use on any type of passenger trains required the explicit permission of the General Superintendent, and the Train Examiner was required to check the vehicle before its inclusion in such a consist.

A further 30 wagons, QR 377 to 406, were built in 1927 to an extended design, with four doors per side in lieu of three. The final member, QR407, was constructed in 1930, using leftover parts and matching the Type 2 design.

In the 1930s, the fitting of automatic couplers saw the underframes replaced. The new design was all-steel, reinforced with centre sills in lieu of the truss rods and heavier bracing on the ends, and the brake equipment on the first 201 wagons was upgraded from the previous combined brake cylinder and auxiliary reservoir to a larger brake cylinder and a separate auxiliary reservoir. When the buffers and truss rods were removed in the 1950s, the wagon capacity was boosted by a further ton.

The 1936 General Appendix specified that QR wagons 394 and 396 "have been specially prepared for the conveyance of theatrical scenery, &c., by Passenger trains. When no so utilised they are to be located at Port Melbourne for terminal traffic. A circular will be issues on each occasion that these trucks are used for the conveyance of special traffic."

In 1979, the class was recoded from QR to VOWA, translated respectively as Victorian, Open, Wood, and Low Speed. From 1983, some wagons were allocated to metropolitan-area work, and had 2000 added to their identifying number: i.e. VOWA356 became VOWA2356. In the mid 1980s, the wagons were generally removed from mainline service and transferred across to maintenance trains, being recoded to VZWA, with the "Z" indicating that change, and vehicles previously renumbered retained that change. Works wagons were also generally had a 30 cm-wide vertical green stripe applied to the right-most door, to help yard workers identify them.

=== R wagon (1880) ===
They were the first bogie open wagon used by the Victorian Railways, with 70 units constructed in 1880 by Harkness & Co., of Sandhurst, as part of a batch which also included 20 bogie boxvans of the S type. Both types of wagons featured a distinctive timber underframe design that was longer than the body, and were fitted with plate-frame bogies, although some later received bar-frame bogies.

They were rated to carry 25 long tons (25.4 t; 28.0 short tons).

The vehicles had a very short working life, with many scrapped by 1899 and the remainder used in departmental traffic. R46 simply vanished in 1886, and R64 had its sides removed around the same time. Their last years in traffic saw the wagons modified and used as mobile coal stages for refuelling of steam locomotives.

Some, such as R6, were erroneously recorded as scrapped early, only to make reappearances decades later. Interestingly, for the most part the odd-numbered wagons were scrapped much earlier than the even-numbered wagons. Of the 31 units scrapped in 1891, only nine were even-numbered.

Many of the remaining wagons had coupler modifications applied around 1910. Some wagons were used in the Melbourne electrification project, including R4, R24, R47, R57 and R65, while others, such as R10, were utilised by the Way and Works department.

In 1903, R22 was scrapped, leaving only 11 vehicles in service. They all lasted another few decades until being scrapped in the period 1931-1937, excepting R47 and R10, scrapped in 1944 and 1945 respectively. Also in 1944, iced wagon TT45 was cut down and reclassed as the second R11, until being scrapped in 1958.

=== VOFX - Bogie Fertiliser Transport ===
Some recoded to BODX (Weekly notice 29/2014 pg15)

=== Narrow Gauge Wagons ===
Just like the broad gauge railways, the 2 ft 6 in (762 mm) narrow gauge lines required open and flat wagons for general goods. Over two hundred were constructed between 1898 and 1914.

== Liveries ==
In general, open wagons were painted in Victorian Railways Wagon Red livery. The grain-proofed wagons had a diagonal yellow stripe in opposite corners to readily identify them from non-grain-proofed wagons, and from 1970, the GY wagons were painted Hansa-Yellow.
