= Victorian Railways louvre vans =

- Manufacturer: Victorian Railways
- Built at: Newport Workshops
- Replaced: Each other
- Operator: Victorian Railways
- Line served: All

Specifications
- Track gauge: 5 ft 3 in (1,600 mm); 4 ft 8 1/2 in (1,435 mm) standard gauge 3 ft 6 in (1,067 mm)

The Victorian Railways used a variety of air-cooled and iced wagons for the transport of all manner of goods. This page covers the history and development of the various classes, and how they changed through their lives.

== General traffic – Fixed-wheel types ==
=== U vans (1897) ===
The U Vans were perhaps one of the most numerous wagons in service on the Victorian Railways. Built in a number of batches at Newport and Bendigo Workshops over a 61-year period extending from 1897 to 1958, the vans were initially intended as a replacement for the then-expiring H type vans. Because the vans were constructed over more sixty years, it follows that there were a number of different designs of vans constructed, as technology improved. Eventually the numbers for the class ranged from 1 through to 1976.

U vans were used primarily for perishable traffic such as fish, fruit and chocolate, as the louvres along the sides and ends provided ventilation while the train was moving. In the mid-1920s, a lot of fruit was carried from the fruit growing areas to Melbourne for distribution and shipment. Other classes of goods could be carried if necessary.

There was concern the vans were too hot in summer months; as a result, about 100 vans were built with double roofs in an attempt to provide some form of shade. By the 1970s, only a small handful of wagons with double roofs were still in service.

Vans built over the 1888–1925 period were constructed with a single trap door installed in place of louvres at one end of the wagon, while later wagons were fitted with a trap door at each end. The trap doors were used for the insertion of long metal bars, which could be used for hanging meat. When wagons were going through regular maintenance in the 1960s, the trap doors were either welded shut or the entire end panel was replaced with a new section of only louvres.

In the late 1950s the railways experimented by placing several sets of roller bearing axles under U vans. As more bogie rolling stock was being built it was decided that further fixed wheel tests were inappropriate; vans already fitted retained the roller bearings, but no new wagons were fitted.

The vans were scrapped as more bogie louvre vans were built with numbers progressively scrapped towards the late 1970s. Many had bodies removed and sold with the underframes being converted to KAB and KMQ flat wagons.

==== U van type 1 (1–277, 279, 280) ====
These vans were wooden bodies on steel underframes. The wagons were built entirely as new stock; it is probable that the design was very similar to the then-common H van, other than the louvres designed to allow air flow through the wagon body.

Wagons of this type measured 21 ft 4 1/2 in (6.52 m) over buffers with the axles at 10 ft 6 in (3.20 m) spacing, and were rated for 10-long-ton (11.2-short-ton; 10.2 t) load. A little under half the group, 1 through 112, were fitted with single roofs and single louvres; the remainder, 113–277, 279 and 280, were fitted with double-roofs as a form of shade, and double-louvres for strength. The second roof was slightly larger, overhanging the ends of the wagon body by about an inch on either end.

Numbers 1–11 were built at Newport Workshops during 1888–1889. After the design was deemed a success, wagon U 12 was constructed as a pattern wagon, also at Newport Workshops; it was then forwarded to Bendigo so that the contractor, P. Ellis, could supply further wagons numbers 13–87. Following this order, it was decided to return construction to Newport Workshops. Wagons 88 and 89 were delivered at the end of 1893, followed by 90 through 112 in 1894. A diagram from 1904 notes that wagons 54 and 86–89 were fitted with 5" diameter Knowles Ventilators (2 each except 88 which had 3), probably to aid cooling. Additionally, wagons 94–96 and 98 were specially modified to carry fish.

The next order placed with Newport Workshops was for wagons 113–127. These wagons were identical in design to the previous series; after 113 and 114, the wagons returned to the single roof and louvres type. About a year after the delivery of U 112, number 113 emerged from Newport Workshops on 19 March 1895. Wagons were constructed in intervals of a handful at a time, with gaps of months or years between deliveries, with the final wagon (U 125) emerging on 25 July 1895; deliveries were not in order of construction. Wagons 121 and 122 are noted in a 1904 rollingstock diagram as having battened floors for carrying fish.

Wagons U 128 through U 202 were constructed by the Braybrook Imperial Co., and U 203 to U 277 by Robinson & Co in Spottiswoode. 279 and 280 were built and delivered by Newport Workshops, with the group completed by December 1897.

Wagons of this group are noted in rollingstock registers as spending anywhere from a week to two months at Newport Workshops around 1932–1934; this is around the time the wagons were fitted with automatic couplers.

By the 1950s, the bodies, which had always required a high level of maintenance, were deteriorating badly. As a result, 1953/54 saw 25 supply their underframes for use under P explosives vans (see below), which were then being constructed. Further P vans were built on the underframes of other wooden U vans, whose bodies had been condemned, during 1958/59.

Forty two of the remaining "Robinson Pattern" U vans were recoded HD during 1957/58, for use as Way and Works Plant Trucks. They lasted in this capacity into the 1970s, with steady attrition from 1971 to 1980.

==== U van type 2 (278, 281–460) (all-steel construction) ====
This series was much like the previous, except that the entire wagon was now constructed with steel, rather than having a wooden body on a steel underframe. Dimensions were identical to previous; 21 ft 4 1/2 in (6.52 m) over buffers, 10 ft 6 in (3.20 m) between axles, 10t load (total 281), single roof and louvres. This series of wagons was built with a through air pipe, but not air brakes. Those were retrofitted over time, after a decision as to the design of brake had been made.

U 278 was built at Newport Workshops as the prototype, and was released to service on 22 March 1897. Then, over the course of about six weeks from 7 June 1898, wagons U 281 to U 310 were released. The next batch was U 311 to U 460, released over about seven months from 24 June 1899. Finally, wagons U 461 through U 560 entered service in 1906. The last batch is said to have had a different handbrake arrangement, although details of the differences are not clear.

Notable wagons within this batch, other than the class leader, are 432, which was marked as having "loose shelves to form a second floor", and U 471, which for unknown reasons had a maximum capacity of 7 long tons (7.8 short tons; 7.1 t) instead of the normal 10 long tons (11.2 short tons; 10.2 t).

During the conversion to automatic couplers, the vans had their buffers removed and the wagon capacity was increased from 10 to 11 long tons (11.2 to 12.3 short tons; 10.2 to 11.2 t).

==== U van type 3 (561–991) (long body, three axles when new) ====
This batch was effectively a whole new class, although included in the U series because the purpose of the vans was the same. The new type was nearly twice the length of previous U vans, measuring 28 ft 11 1/2 in (8.83 m) over buffers. To support the extra weight, the vans were fitted with three axles, spaced 7 ft 6 in (2.29 m) apart. The maximum load was 15 long tons (15.2 t; 16.8 short tons). However, the door size was maintained at 4 ft 6 in (1.37 m), which later caused problems with loading/unloading the extra goods. The vans were fitted with a wheel-type handbrake, and the top louvre on the end was fitted with a single trap door to allow insertion/removal of meat-hanging bars. The roof was still a single layer of plain steel panels.

The first 30 wagons, U 561 to U 590, were built at Newport Workshops in 1908. Following that, 120 wagons were delivered in 1912–1913 (up to U 711), and another 280 wagons up to 1919, fairly evenly spaced – although there were no wagons built during 1918, a result of World War I as well as the need to focus on providing rolling stock and equipment for the suburban electrification project. The final wagon of the type, U 991, was delivered on 13 June 1919.

These wagons were heavily modified around 1932–1934, with the middle axle removed and the other two modified with larger axle boxes, creating the ubiquitous 15-foot (4.57 m) underframe (in fact 15 feet or 4.57 metres between axles, not over ends). This change occurred with the introduction of automatic couplers; as part of the same project, when buffers were removed the wagons were upgraded to a maximum load of 16 long tons (16.3 t; 17.9 short tons) instead of the previous 15 long tons (15.2 t; 16.8 short tons). Of the 430 wagons of the type, about 390 were upgraded as such; the remainder had bogies added, and were re classed UB.

A number of these vans were later retrofitted with 7 ft 0 in (2.13 m) long side doors; it is thought that this occurred around 1950.

The most unusual U van of the entire fleet is thought to be U 961, which had its body replaced in 1963 with an all-new design. The sides of the van were VLX components, fitted with B van sliding doors; the ends were a custom-made part. This was done as an experiment for a new type of explosives van.

==== U van type 4 (992–1066) (corrugated iron roof) ====
In an attempt to further experiment with internal cooling of the perishable loads, a new batch of U vans was delivered in 1925. While the design was mostly identical to the previous batch (including the trap doors and six-wheel design), the new series of 75 vans was built with a corrugated iron roof in lieu of the previous steel plate design. Additionally, the vans had a 7-foot (2.13 m) wide side door, instead of a 4-foot-6-inch (1.37 m) wide door, to make for faster loading and unloading. These wider doors were partially flat near the base.

The entire series was delivered in 1925.

The same modifications were made in the 1932–34 period as the previous batch, with around 20 wagons from this group being converted to UB bogie wagons.

==== U van type 5 (1067–1216) (second trap door) ====
Identical to the type 4 series in most ways, the only design change at this point was the addition of a second trap door for meat bars, at the opposite end of the wagon.

Wagons U 1067–1116 were built at Newport over three months from November 1934; wagons U 1117–1217 were built at Bendigo workshops from February 1936 to December 1938.

Notably, U 1141 through U 1217 were constructed with two axles instead of three, and autocouplers, the Westinghouse automatic brake system and increased load of 16 tons were part of the wagons from new.

==== U van type 6 (1217–1466) (lever handbrake) ====
The final development of the long U type van design, the only change made over the type 5's was the replacement of the wheel handbrake for a lever type. All of these wagons were constructed, from new, with two axles spaced 15 feet (4.57 m) apart, autocouplers and the Westinghouse air brake system.

Wagons U 1217–1266 were built at Bendigo over about six months from December 1938; 1267 was built at Newport in the middle of 1946, followed by 1268–1366 in 1947. 1367–1466 were built at Newport over nine months from September 1951.

==== U van type 7 (1467–1796) (rebuilds) ====
As mentioned above, by the 1960s the original, short U vans were becoming maintenance-intensive, particularly those with wooden bodies. However, at the time there were not enough bogie wagons on the Victorian Railways to justify scrapping of the fleet, so instead the underframes were recycled and rebuilt with new bodies at Bendigo workshops. Of the 460 short wagons originally built (179 timber body, 281 all-steel), 254 had their bodies replaced with the new type, along with 76 underframes donated from scrapped open wagons of the IA type.

Wagons U 1467–1545 entered service in 1956; 1546–1663 in 1957; 1664–1782 in 1958 and 1783–1796 in 1959.

While the bodies were replaced, the underframes were left mostly untouched; they were still 21 ft 5 in (6.53 m) over pulling lines, 10 ft 6 in (3.20 m) between axles and a maximum 11 1/2-long-ton (12.9-short-ton; 11.7 t) load. The new bodies were similar in design to the early VF bogie vans; they all had sliding doors (based on the B type vans) and corrugated iron roofing. The ends of the bodies had a few varieties in detail, with later wagons fitted with an additional cross-beam near the top of the end pieces for extra strength. Additionally, later wagons had a door based on the VF wagons.

==== UB van, later VLAA ====
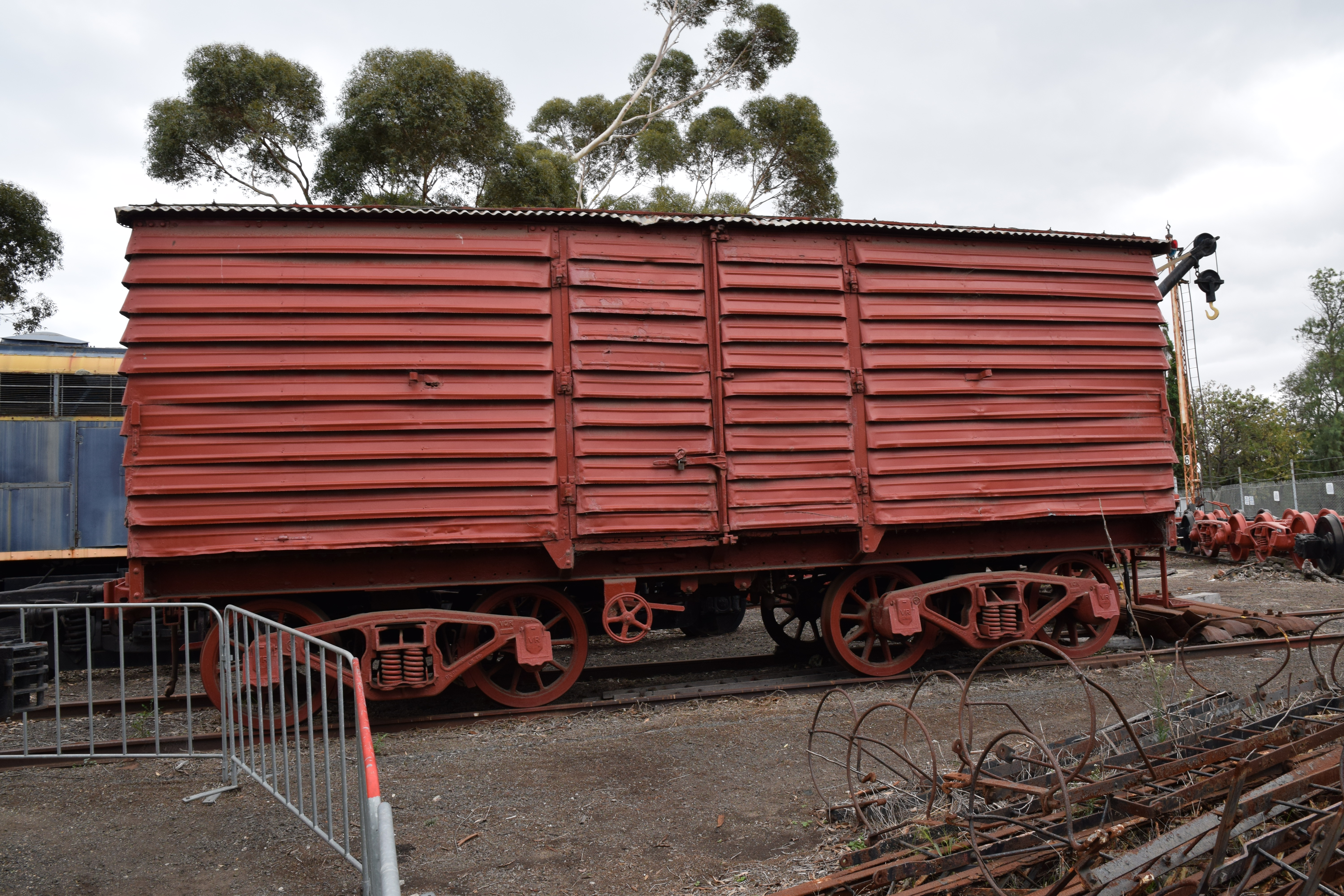
Ex-UB van VLAA 56 at the Newport Railway Museum in April 2016

When the six-wheel louvre vans were being converted to four-wheel in 1932–1934, the opportunity was taken to convert 50, later 60 vans to bogies instead of fixed-axle. The new vans were fitted with a coupler pocket capable of being fitted with either autocouplers or transition hooks, though the latter was far more common.

The vans were initially fitted with diamond-frame bogies, which were displaced from open QR wagons; at the time these were being upgraded to the barframe type. It is thought that the UB project may have been conceived as a method to use up the leftover bogies, more than as an attempt to increase capacity or speed of the service.

UB vans were regularly used behind railmotors on lightly-used branch lines, in the spirit of the old "mixed" train service. Depending on the line gradients, a railmotor may have been able to haul up to three wagons. Around the 1940s, some UBs were fitted with an upgraded, all-welded type of bogie more suited to passenger train speeds. Also, for use behind railmotors and passenger trains, the vans were fitted with taildiscs and side brackets for lamps. These fittings were never removed, and could be seen on UB vans as late as the 1970s.

From 1955, the railways introduced a code system to identify vehicle speeds, in conjunction with the New South Wales Railways in planning for the new standard gauge link from Melbourne to Albury. As part of the project, it was intended that some goods trains could be marshalled exclusively with higher-speed rollingstock.

In the late 1960s/early 1970s some wagons had the bottom three louvres in the doors replaced with flat steel sheets.

The UB vehicles in passenger traffic were coded _UP_, the "P" denoting passenger speed. With the reduction of UP traffic in the early 1960s, the vans were recoded back to UB. In the early 1960s, some UB vans were fitted with fast freight bogies and recoded to _UF_.

The last UB in service, UB 56 was recoded to VLAA 56 in 1981. Documents indicated the code for UB would be 'VLLA', but this was a typing mistake. The van was out of service by 1984. In 1992 it was sighted at Spotswood Workshops, held for preservation; it is now stored in Newport East Block with markings indicating that it is being held for the Australian Railway Historical Society.

==== UF van ====
Four UB vans were recoded to UF during 1961. They were placed on cast bogies capable of higher speeds, a result of internal springing that reduced vibrations. The four vans were 15, 17, 53 and 55.

UF 15 was converted from, then back to a UB in November 1961. The same month conversion appears to be an error; perhaps too many vehicles were converted, or it was found that not as many were required.

In the late 1970s the three remaining UF vans were running on the early morning 'paper' trains that transferred metropolitan newspapers to regional centres.

The vans were scrapped during 1978/79. The body of UF 17 was at Moama until Feb 1996.

==== UP van ====
In 1955, the UB vans fitted with passenger type bogies were given the code "UP". These were vans that had been fitted with high speed bogies in the 1930s and 1940s for use on fast trains and behind railmotors. The new bogie type was the "TT 30", intended to improve the ride quality of the vans for use on passenger trains.

The UP van numbers were 14, 28, 32, 33, 42, 46, 48, 53 and 60. It is thought that UP 19 also ran; UB 19 is mentioned as being fitted with "pass" (passenger) bogies in 1956, though the records do not show the code UP. Vans recoded were fitted side lamp brackets and tail discs at each end.

The vans were recoded back to UB between 1958 and 1961, but kept the additional fittings; the recode was a result of new VP vans entering service in large numbers.

==== Advertising on vans ====
From 1925, some of the vans earned extra revenue by being painted with company advertising, effectively becoming billboards on wheels. Known numbers are:

Van	From	To	Advertiser
UB 19	?	?	Young Husband Ltd.
U 966	?	?	Robison Brothers
U 1016	?	?	Peters Ice Cream
U 1346	?	?	Peters
U 1346	?	?	Peters Ice Cream
U 1053	?	?	Kurdeez Agricultural Lime.
U 1072	?	?	Allen's Cure 'Em
U 1081	?	?	CSR Cane-ite
U 1094	?	?	Edison's Spark Plugs
U 1108	?	?	Heatane Gas
U 1109	?	?	John McNamara & Co
U 1115	?	?	John McNamara & Co
U 1115	?	?	McNamara's Trenchards
U 1122	?	?	Barry's Cookwell Flower
U 1152	?	?	Glen Valley Tea
U 1156	?	?	Haig's Scotch/Whiskey
U 1199	?	?	Sickle Brand
U 1200	?	?	Orlando Wines
U 1214	?	?	Lustrous Paint
U 1215	?	?	Gippsland & Northern
U 1216	?	?	Quick Enamel
U 1231	?	?	Sunshine Biscuits
U 1236	?	?	Sunshine Biscuits
U 1235	?	?	J.Kennon & Sons
U 1236	?	?	A.B. Wine Tonic
U 1341	?	?	A.B. Wine Tonic
U 1258	?	?	White Crow
U 1299	?	?	Young Husband Ltd
U 1369	?	?	Hutmill Farm Feeds
U 1404	?	?	Edinburgh Paint
U 1412	?	?	V.P.C.
U 1416	?	?	Hardy's Indigestion Powder
U 1417	?	?	K.S.P. Chandler Hardware
U 1439	?	?	Sthil Chain Saws
U 1456	?	?	Edward Trenchard & Co.

=== MU vans (1932) ===
This code was discovered by Peter J Vincent during research in 1992. It appears that during the 1930s conversion project from screw couplers to automatic couplers resulted in a short-term lack of louvre and box vans; to fill the gap, fifty M cattle wagons were converted from 1932 during their own conversion to autocouplers, with wooden planks and louvres used to cover the gaps over the normal cattle wagon design. The wagons were restored to their M wagon type and identity by 1934.

The wagons were used primarily for fruit traffic.

The MU wagons were taken from the M wagons between 323 and 418.

=== V type louvre van (1925) ===
==== Original vans ====
Following the experiments with the S.A.R. M type vans, it was decided to purchase a pair of wagons from the American Car & Foundry, USA, for further testing. These two were similar in design to S.A.R. wagons, except with a louvre design rather than a plain boxcar design. The two vans were delivered as kits in 1925 and assembled at Newport Workshops, becoming vans V1 and V2. As the tests proved successful, the VR constructed a further 80 wagons over the period 1927–1929. These vans were of a similar design, but with a corrugated roof placed on in lieu of the sheet steel design, to better suit Australian conditions. Vans numbered 51 and above were fitted with twin doors per side at one-third in from the ends of the wagons, rather than a single central door.

==== VP (1954) louvre van – 70mph ====
From 1954 to 1956, the V group was expanded with a further 50 wagons, numbered 100 through 149 (leaving a gap of 83–99). The new vans were issued as either V or VP, depending on the type of bogies fitted. Eventually, as the vans received newer bogies, the 100–149 group was reclassed to VP to indicate their higher maximum speed and the purpose of running on passenger trains for baggage, parcels and mail transport.

In 1974, VP 103 was partially destroyed in a fire. During the rebuild process the van was fitted with a VSX-style roof, because those were in production at Ballarat Workshops at the time.

In the mid-1970s, it was common for most country passenger trains to run with a VP van, usually at the Melbourne end of the consist. This meant that half the time the VP van would be trailing the guard's van; to facilitate this, VP vans were equipped with a taildisc and lamp brackets.

As an example of regular broad-gauge trains in the North-Eastern district:

Melbourne-bound services

- 7:15 am UP Albury (No.8 Express Monday–Saturday; No.10 Express Sunday), 1 van behind locomotive Tuesday & Friday or 3 vans behind locomotive Wednesday, Thursday and Saturday.
- 3:25 pm (4:30 pm Saturdays) UP Albury (No.18 Passenger) to Melbourne, 1 van behind locomotive Tuesday to Saturday.

Outbound services

- 8:35 am DOWN Albury (No.5 Express), 1 van at lead of the Albury portion, Tuesday-Saturday. Train was a combined Albury and Tocumwal service, splitting at Seymour; it included a guards van behind the VP but the rear of the Albury portion was an MBS buffet car.
- 4:45 pm DOWN Albury (No.15 Express or No.15-Altered Express if Friday-exclusive optional No.9 running), 1 van at rear weekdays but to be detached at Wodonga on Fridays; 2 additional vans behind locomotive on Monday, Tuesday and Thursday, to be detached at Wodonga (5 minutes allowed).
- 5:02 pm DOWN Albury (No.9 Passenger Conditional), 1 van, detach at Benalla (4 minutes allowed). Train only ran on Fridays and only if required; when running the schedule for the 4:45 pm was altered to terminate at Wodonga at 9:10 pm instead of Albury at 9:55 pm. (The 4:45 pm train arrived Albury at 9:20 pm on Monday–Thursday).

Note that even assuming the Wodonga drop-offs are delivered to Albury later, the above causes an imbalance; each week, two more vans are running towards Melbourne than away from Melbourne, not counting the odd Benalla drop-off from No.9. These imbalances would have been resolved by attaching extra vans to freight trains, and there were daily scheduled transfers between Wodonga and Albury yards – two on weekdays, one on weekends.

==== VF (1961) louvre van – 60mph ====
In the early 1960s, the original V type vans 1–81 were fitted with upgraded bogies and recoded to VF, allowing running at up to 60 mph (97 km/h) (V 82 had been scrapped in 1960). These upgrades were completed with the intention of allowing faster travel times, as well as to provide more stock for the standard gauge working to Sydney. The VF series of wagons ran in general traffic, although a small number were specifically allocated to newspaper trains.

==== Standard Gauge operations from 1962 ====
In 1963, confusion among staff was becoming a problem, with regards to which wagons were gauge-exchangeable and which were not. In response to this the code letter "X" was introduced to indicate vehicles so suited. Plans were made to apply this to the VF class (i.e. as VX), although the program was cancelled while the first, VF 29, was still in the workshops being prepared.

However, a group of about 20 VP vans were placed permanently on the standard gauge for trains running between Melbourne and Sydney, usually attached to trains like the Spirit of Progress and the Intercapital Daylight. For example, in 1973 it was expected that the VP van was to trail the locomotive on the Melbourne 8:40 pm departure of the Intercapital Daylight, all days except Sunday and Monday.

This group is known to have included 100, 104, 107, 108, 110–112, 126–127, 130, 134, 137, 140–141 and 146.

Vans that had, at some point, operated on the standard gauge were fitted with black number boards and white text on those; other vans had the information simply painted onto the body.

==== 1979 Recoding ====
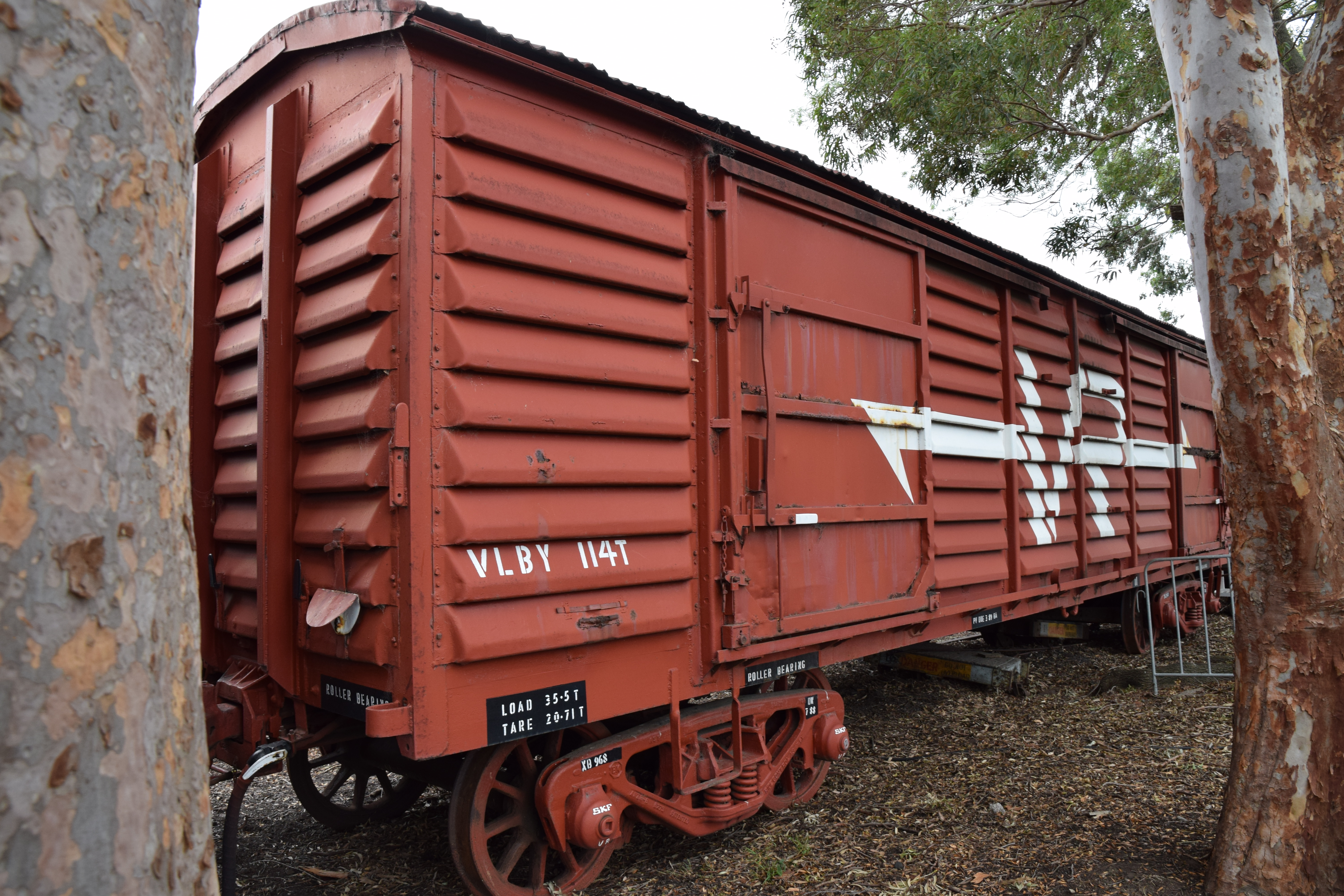
Ex-VF van VLBY 114 at the Newport Railway Museum in April 2016

When the 1979 recoding rolled around, the VF class were recoded to VLBY and the VP class became VLPY.

By this time not many of the former VF vans were left; only about ten of the freight wagons actually made the jump, due to a combination of age and that many newer designs were available. The recoded wagons were s 2, 14 and 44 of the one-door type, and 54, 65, 66, 69, 72 and 81 of the two-door type. Of those, VLBY 2, 69, 72 and 81 had all been withdrawn from service within a year of their respective recodes. VF 17 may have been recoded, but records are unclear.

All the VP vehicles were recoded to VLPY, numbers 100–149.

==== 1981 New Deal ====
In 1981 with the New Deal, passenger trains started to use former boxvans in lieu of louvre vans which swapped bogies with the VLPY fleet. As a result, between 1982 and 1983 the VLPY fleet was gradually recoded to VLBY. Forty of the fifty total vans were converted. Of the remainder, three – 139, 140 and 142 – were instead used to build the three original PH power vans in 1984, two – 100 and 126 – were instead recoded to VLPF (retaining their bogies), and five were taken off-register while still as VLPY: 111, 129, 130, 134 and 136. VLPY111's body was sold to a property on Wedge St in Epping.

==== 1988 Recode ====
In 1988, the railways realised that the letter "Y" was incorrect and should have been "F" in the codes – i.e. VxxY should have been VxxF. By this time most of the VLBY fleet had been withdrawn, but the last five in service – 109–110, 121, 127 and 145 – were recoded from VLBY to VLBF.

Vans VLPF 100 and 126 were photographed at North Melbourne in 1990, then reported as seen in Spotswood yards, stored, in 1996.

==== Disposal ====
By 1991, most of the VLBY vans were out of service and stored; over the next few years most of the class were either scrapped or sold as bodies.

==== In preservation ====
Today, fourteen vans of the V design still exist. VLBF 6 is the only one of the VF range and it is currently with the Australian Railway Historical Society; the remainder are ex-VP vans, numbers 100, 103, 105, 108, 109, 114, 122, 125, 129, 132, 133, 135 and 138.

== 1960s bogie louvre van types ==
By the early 1960s, the V series of bogie louvre vans were beginning to wear out, with the original series being around 35 years old; and the 50 new members were being used mainly on passenger trains. However, with the continuing increase of traffic (particularly on the new standard gauge line), a need was created for a new, standard type of bogie louvre van.

=== VLF (1962) & VLX (1964) – Medium Bogie Louvre Van ===
The need for more capacity resulted in the new class of VLF wagons, with the first member, VLF 1, released to service on 25 May 1962. The class became known as "medium" because of the handful of "small" bogie louvre vans still in service and classed UB/UF/UP.

The interior was designed for two rows of ten 46 in × 46 in (1,168 mm × 1,168 mm) square pallets, an indication that the Victorian Railways was keeping in mind developing trends, as pallets are still used today for stock movements. The current Australian Standard timber pallet, S1165A, is 1,165 mm (45.9 in) square, 150 mm (5.9 in) deep. The vans were also limited to 40 long tons (41 t; 45 short tons) maximum capacity. The sides of the wagon were limited internally to 7 ft 6 3/8 in (2,296 mm) tall. There was more room in the centre, but the door heights would have been an issue.

The first hundred-or-so wagons released, numbered between 1–87 and 99–135, entered service as VLF, indicating that whatever gauge they were on, they had to stay on. Wagons 88 through 98 were released as VLX, indicating that they could change gauges as needed by replacing the bogies. VLF 135 entered service in mid-1964. Vans 1, 2 and 28–76 had been built at Newport Workshops, while the remainder – 3–27 and 77–135 – were constructed at Bendigo Workshops.

However, this quickly proved insufficient for traffic requirements, so more wagons were constructed from March 1965, and the existing VLF wagons were all reclassed to VLX. By 1967 the class had reached 660 members, with about half done at Newport and the remainder split between Ballarat and Bendigo workshops.

Because of the large numbers, the VLX class quickly became the Victorian Railways' primary bogie louvre van, on both broad and standard gauges. The vans were regularly seen all over the country, on standard gauge trains as far-flung as Brisbane and Perth. This was clearly intentional, as the diagram for the VLX design notes that the type measurements conform to the Queensland Railways' narrow gauge dimensions.

VLX 467 was fitted with a 'Miner' wheel handbrake as a trial. Otherwise, handbrakes on this class were 'ratchet' type.

=== VHX (1963) – Large Bogie Louvre Van ===
This small group of 20 wagons was constructed over the period 1963 to 1965. The design is basically a stretched version of the VLX louvre van, with many similar concepts. The interior was expanded from 20 to 26 standard pallets. The vans were also limited to 50 long tons (51 t; 56 short tons) maximum capacity. The sides of the wagon were limited internally to 7 ft 10 3/8 in (2,397 mm) tall. There was more room in the centre, but the door heights would have been an issue.

Strangely, the diagram indicates a flat underframe, but in practice the wagons were built with a fish-belly design.

The VHX vans when built were painted all-over brown; the roofs were resprayed on some wagons to silver around 1978, with the intent of reflecting more heat and keeping the inside of the wagon cooler.

=== VSX (1972), VSF (1978) – Large Bogie Louvre Van ===
Based on the previous VHX design, between 1972 and 1976 a further 250 vans were built. The vans were slightly different from the VHX type, with additional strengthening 'ribs' added between the louvre groups on the sides. The new vans were classed VSX and numbered 801 to 1050.

The van design featured the Miner type handbrake, corrugated sliding doors over the centre single opening of the van, and a red-painted body with silver roof. The vans were decorated with a large VR logo.

While in interstate service, three vans were destroyed in derailments; VSX 809 in Ubonia, Western Australia and VSX 930 at Port Augusta, South Australia in 1978, and VSX 834 at Zanthus, Western Australia in 1979.

Around 1978, seven wagons, 1036–1045 were reclassed to VSF to trap those into the new Freight Centre service.

=== 1979 recodes ===
When the Railways of Australia recoding system came into place, the VLX, VHX and VSX/F series of wagons were recoded to a similar theme. The VLX wagons became VLCX; the VHX became VLDX and the VSX/F became VLEX/Y, indicating the wagon types' heritage. The first two changes were fairly straightforward; however, at the same time as the recode, the VLEY code was boosted to about 120 wagons, using wagons that otherwise would have been converted from VSX to VLEX.

The choice of "C" as the first in the new codes was due to VLA- being taken by the bogie U vans, and VLB- being taken by the V/VF/VP bogie louvre van series dating from 1925.

=== 1980s ===
During the late 1980s, some VLCX vans were cut down to flatwagons and modified as VZSX sleeper transports.

In 1988, any vans coded VL-Y had the Y replaced with an F, to fix an error in the original recoding scheme.

==== VLNX (1981) Newsprint vans ====
In 1981, 25 VLEX/Y vans were converted to VLNX, exclusively for Newsprint traffic.

=== 1990s ===
From about 1990, some louvred doors were replaced with flat doors, perhaps as a result of a lack of spare parts.

By 1991, about one hundred VLCX vans were surplus to requirements and placed into storage. Around the same time, at least eight VLEX's were stencilled for "PAPER TRAFFIC ONLY DYNON – DRY CREEK".

In 1993, three VLEX vans were destroyed in a derailment in Western Australia. In lieu of repayment, V/line requested three comparable vans in exchange. The three replacement VLEX vans: 873, 874 and 989 arrived in Victoria July 1993, repainted and reclassed from Western Australian WBAX boxvans.

==== National Rail Corporation Recodes ====
For NRC use, the VLCX vans were recoded to RLCX, and about 70 VLEX vans were recoded RLEX.

The wagons were returned to V/Line in late 1996 / early 1997, converted back to their previous codes and stored.

==== VLVX (1994) Intrastate-only vans ====
In 1994, when the VLCX wagons were being recoded to RLCX, twenty wagons were retained by V/Line and coded VLVX for use within Victoria, between Melbourne and various freight centres. The number group was 1 – 20, although the wagons were selected at random from the VLCX group.

==== VBFX (1996) ====
During 1996, VLEX 949 was heavily modified to become VBFX 1. Another conversion from VLEX 1039 was started, but not completed. VBFX 1 was later converted to VFTX 28.

The conversion was enacted by Grizzly Engineering of Swan Hill during 1996. The modifications included the removal of the fixed side louvre panels and doors, the fitting of two internal bulkheads, 3 pairs of external bi-folding doors and repainting into V/Line Freight colours. VFBX 1 saw very little use, and by August 2000 the body had been removed and the underframe converted to flat-wagon VFTX 28.

A second conversion by Grizzly Engineering (VBFX 2) was commenced but never completed. The underframe of VLEX 1039 became flat-wagon VFTX 39 by September 2000.

=== 2000s ===
As of 2001, 61 vans were still registered in the RAMS (Railways of Australia Monitoring System).

During 2003, at least 28 VLEX's were repainted into Freight Australia colours and recoded to VLRX for rice traffic.

To retain some VLCX vans for intrastate use, V/line recoded some vans to VLVX for parcels traffic use.

By 1996, most of the early numbered vans had been scrapped. Underframes were being used to replace older underframes under tank wagons.

==== Underframe conversions: VFWY (1983), VZLY (1985), VZZF (1993), VFTX (timber traffic, 2000) ====
In April 1983, the underframe of VLEX 817 was converted to VFWY 1, a flat wagon with fittings for transferring diesel engine blocks; by 1985 the wagon had been reclassed to VZLY 80.

In March 1993, two further underframes were taken and converted to VZZF, for transfer of bogie frames (without the wheels). VZZF 1 came from the frame of VLEX 845; VZZF 2 came from VLEX 942. These wagons were converted with the intention of transporting standard gauge bogies from the Goninan workshops in Bendigo, and North Melbourne goods yard, where wagons were transferred between gauges. In 1997 one of the VZZF vans was seen in storage at the Bendigo Workshops; it was fitted with 18 wooden floor bolsters spaced evenly along the floor. These bolsters appeared to extend 150–200 mm (5.9–7.9 in) over the side of the wagon sides.

In 2000, 41 surplus VLEX vans had their bodies removed, and the underframes were converted to carry sawn pine logs and recoded VFTX.

== Narrow Gauge ==
Just like the broad gauge railways, the 2 ft 6 in (762 mm) narrow gauge lines required covered vans. The vast majority of those were louvre vans.

== Hearse vans (C/J vans) ==
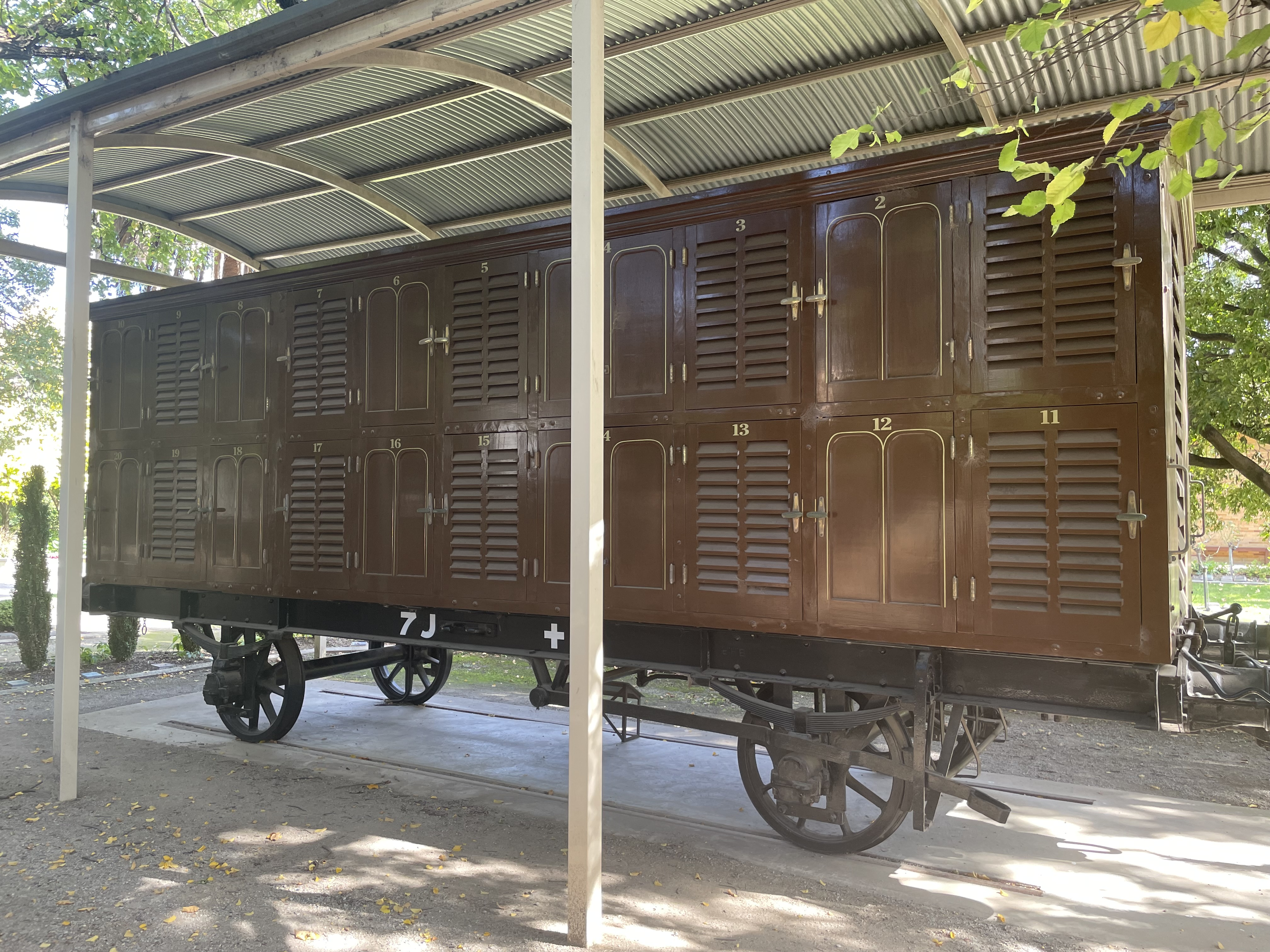
Restored J van at Fawkner Memorial Park, renumbered 7 J, in April 2024

In 1893, the Victorian Railways decided that new wagons were required for the transportation of corpses, as the existing arrangements were unsatisfactory.

To fill the need as quickly as possible, two mail vans (E 1 & E 2) and a carriage truck (G 24) were converted to hearse vans C 1, 2 and 3, each 15 feet (4.57 m) long with 20 separate 1'7"-wide compartments over two levels. The trio, when not running to Springvale or Fawkner cemeteries, were kept in the Mortuary Dock off Batman Avenue at Flinders Street Station; this siding was accessible from what is now known as Platform 13. Between 1902 and 1903 another six vans, numbered 4 to 9 were constructed. The new vans were also four-wheelers, about 18 feet (5.49 m) long with room for fourteen corpses on two levels. The design was somewhat unusual in that the outer twelve slots had a single door, but the centre slot on each level had two half-width doors. The compartments ranged in size, with the four outermost slots 2'3½" wide, the two centre slots 3'1" wide and the other eight slots only 2'3" wide. Also in 1903, vans C 2 and C 3 was scrapped, although a new C 3 was converted from Mail Van E 3 in 1906. Vans C 1 and C 3 (the second) were scrapped in 1909.

In the 1910 recoding, the remaining vans, C 4 through C 9, were renumbered to J 1 through J 6 in the same order. However, by 1912 their underframes were wearing out and capacity requirements were changing, so the six vans were lifted from their underframes, and the bodies were cut and merged to give four new six-wheeled wagons of about 26 feet long, each capable of conveying up to 20 corpses at a time. Vans J 4 & 5 created J 7, J 2 became J 8, J 1 & 3 gave J 9 and J 6 became J 10. It is likely that either the new J 8 and J 10 were extended with newly built components, or that they used leftover parts from the other conversions. Overall, the fleet capacity was reduced by a total of four compartments.

When electrification onto the Springvale Cemetery line and past Fawkner cemetery rolled around in the early 1920s, the four vans were provided with through cables to allow them to be included between a Swing Door M and D set. A daily electric visitors and mortuary train ran to Fawkner until 1939, and a conditional mortuary train to Springvale Cemetery until 1943. Until the end, the vans were averaging around 2,000 miles (3,200 km) per year, which equates to 100 trips per year on the 20–30-mile (32–48 km) round journey.

The vans hung around for about six years following the cancellation of corpse trains, until they were finally withdrawn in 1949; at this time the electric through-cabling gear was removed, and the vans were scrapped or sold in 1953.

In 1990, the Fawkner Cemetery restored a J van using a van body found at Romsey and an underframe purchased from the railways. The van was restored to cosmetic accuracy and numbered 7, although the body number was never known. The van now sits adjacent to Platform 2 at Fawkner station.

== Liveries ==
In general, louvre vans have been painted in Victorian Railways Wagon Red livery. From the 1960s onwards this was amended with varying sizes of VR symbol on each side depending on the timeframe.
