= Jolimont Workshops =

Victorian Railways workshop (closed 1993)

Coordinates: 37.8196°S 144.9772°E

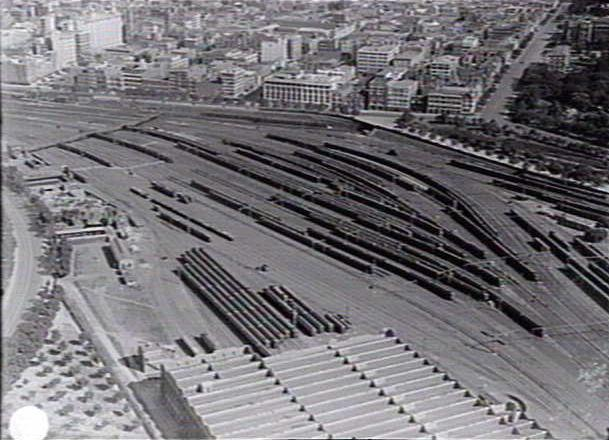
Overhead view of the workshops and yard looking north west.

Jolimont Workshops was a railway workshop operated by the Victorian Railways beside Jolimont Yard, near the Melbourne CBD, Australia. Opened in 1917 and dedicated to the maintenance and repair of electric multiple units and locomotives, it was the first part of the yard to be closed and relocated, with demolition completed in 1994. The site is now part of the Melbourne Park tennis complex.

== History ==
Built as part of the electrification of the Melbourne suburban network, it was the main storage, servicing and maintenance depot for the new fleet of suburban trains. The workshops was erected to the south along Batman Avenues, with the storage sidings located between the running lines. The site had been home to the Princes Bridge locomotive depot built in 1888. This depot had replaced a small engine shed located east of the station of the same name and built in 1859 by the Melbourne and Suburban Railway Company.

In addition to the maintenance of the suburban multiple unit fleet, the E class suburban freight locomotives were housed there from their introduction, as steam locomotives were housed at the North Melbourne Locomotive Depot. The L class mainline electrics followed on their introduction in the 1950s, but were moved with the diesel fleet to the new South Dynon Locomotive Depot in 1964, and the entire E class fleet followed in June 1968.

Until relocated to Spencer Street, the Victorian Railways housed their railmotors fleet at the depot. By the 1950s they included the AEC, Leyland, Dodge, petrol electric, and 102hp, 153hp and 280hp Walker railmotors.

The workshops had a whistle that signalled the start of the workday, which could be heard in the city and surrounding suburbs. Rumored to be a WW2 air raid siren, it was the last industrial whistle in central Melbourne. After the opening of the adjacent Tennis Centre officials asked for the whistle to be silenced, which was eventually done.

== Facilities ==
Train lifted off bogies in the lifting bay

The workshops had a main carshed, with tracks leading into it at both the east (Richmond) and west (Flinders Street) ends. The brick car shed was 109 metres wide, 122 to 183 metres long depending on the section, and was designed to be expanded to a uniform width of 305 metres. The car shed was divided into three separate sections:

- The workshop and fitting bays were each 183 by 18 metres in size, with four tracks and three inspection pits. For the handling of bogies under overhaul there were 24 short traverse tracks and pits. Two 25 tonne cranes were installed in the lifting bay, and two 15 tonne electric cranes were provided in the workshop bay.
- The inspection and running bay was 122 by 37 metres in size, and had nine tracks all with inspection pits.
- The painting and varnishing bay was 122 by 32 metres in size, and had five tracks, all equipped with overhead platform level with car floors for the use of workers.

A 21 m (69 ft) turntable was provided for reversing the cabs of motor cars and driving trailers into the required direction. A carriage wash was also located at the workshops for cleaning the exterior of trains.

== Shunters ==
The workshops were assigned a variety of different shunting locomotives for use in the yard:

- Two Swing Door motor carriages, numbered 113M (single ended) and 156M (double ended) and modified with dual pantographs. 113M was used as shunter from at least 1926 and 156M was used as a temporary parcels coach from 1923, both cars continuing in this use until about 1990.
- A V class diesel hydraulic locomotive, numbered V 56 and used for hauling suburban trains though the carriage wash.

== Demise ==
By the mid-1980s the Metropolitan Transit Authority (successor to the Victorian Railways) drew up plans for the closure and decentralisation of the Jolimont Workshops, with new railway facilities to be built around suburban Melbourne. The original plan included:

- Epping Workshops:

- maintenance and repair area for 6 three car sets
- lifting jacks for a 3 car set
- acid wash and steam cleaning pit
- depot for 120 train crew
- stabling for 13 three car trains, in single train sidings

- Nunawading:

- maintenance area for 10 three car sets
- lifting, washing and steam cleaning pit
- depot for 83 train crew
- stabling for 12 six car trains, in single train sidings

- Oakleigh

- inspection and repair facilities
- lifting, washing and steam cleaning pit
- depot for 65 train crew
- stabling for 15 three car trains, in single train sidings

- Newport Workshops

- repair facilities for 7 three car sets
- lifting, washing and steam cleaning pit
- depot for 132 train crew
- stabling for 15 six car trains, in double ended two train long sidings

- Carrum

- Extend and reconstruct existing sidings
- depot for 26 train crew

- Mordialloc

- Construction of an additional 100m long siding
- depot for 18 train crew

- Macaulay

- new main line crossover
- depot for 50 train crew

Of the proposals, the Nunawading facility was dropped due to protests by local residents. Epping Workshops was the first main facility to open, entering service in 1990. Further expansion of workshop facilities did not happen until the rationalisation of Jolimont Yard itself in 1997, with a smaller facility built at Bayswater to replace the abandoned Nunawading facility, while a second was built at Westall instead of that at Oakleigh. Macaulay also gained a light maintenance facility beside the existing stabling yard in 1993. A replacement washing plant and stabling sidings were made operational in Melbourne Yard in May 1995.

The workshops finally closed in April 1993. Track and overhead was removed by November 1993, with demolition of the workshops approved in May 1994, and the inspection and paint shops demolished by August 1994. The land was used to expand the Melbourne Park tennis centre, with the opening of additional outside courts to the north of Rod Laver Arena.
