= Victorian Railways E class (electric) =

Class of Australian electric locomotives

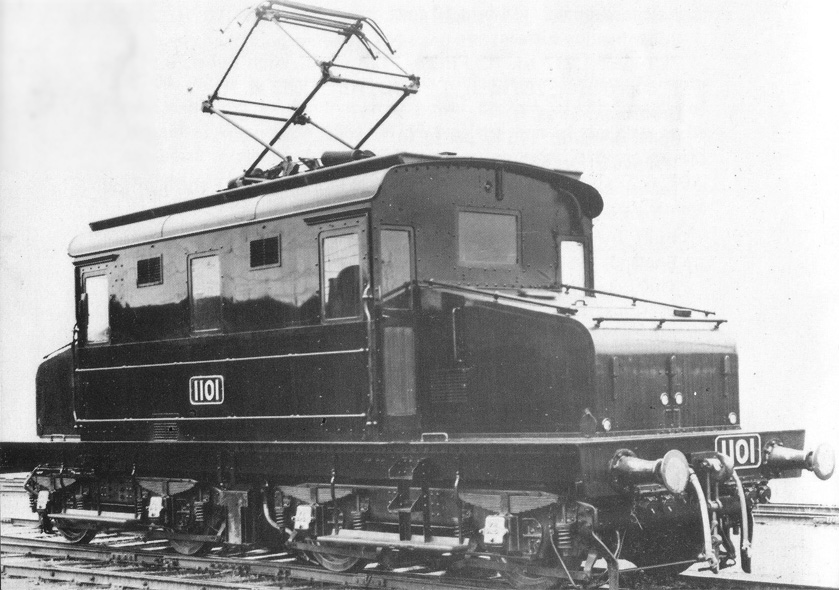
- Original steeplecab locomotive 1101
Type and origin
- Power type: Electric
- Builder: VR Newport and Jolimont Workshops
- Build date: 1923 (steeplecab); 1928–1929 (boxcab)
- Total produced: 2 (steeplecab); 10 (boxcab)
Specifications
- Configuration
  - UIC: Bo'Bo'
- Gauge: 5 ft 3 in (1,600 mm)
- Length: 36 ft 4 1/2 in (11,090 mm) (steeplecab); 39 ft 2 1/2 in (11,950 mm) (boxcab)
- Loco weight: 50 long tons (50.8 t; 56.0 short tons) (steeplecab); 55 long tons (55.9 t; 61.6 short tons) (boxcab)
- Electric system/s: 1.5 kV DC Catenary
- Current pickup: Pantograph
- Traction motors: 4x General Electric Type 237A
Performance figures
- Maximum speed: 65 km/h (40 mph)
- Power output: 620 hp (460 kW)
- Tractive effort: Starting: 24,400 lbf (109 kN); Continuous: 14,160 lbf (63.0 kN)
Career
- Numbers: 1100, 1101 (steeplecab); 1102–1111 (boxcab)

The Victorian Railways E class is a class of electric locomotive that ran on the Victorian Railways (VR) from 1923 until 1984. Introduced shortly after the electrification of the suburban rail system in Melbourne, Australia, and based on the same electrical and traction equipment (Note: Unlike the similarly equipped Dogbox & Tait trains (including Pacels Vans), and PERMs, these electric locomotives retained the original plate frame bogies, never receiving the later channel frame or cast bogies.) as Melbourne's early suburban electric multiple unit fleet, they provided power for suburban goods services and shunting for six decades.

== History ==
With the rapid expansion of Melbourne's suburban electrification scheme, becoming by 1924 the largest in the world at 346 miles (557 km), the Victorian Railways decided to utilise the advantages of electric traction for suburban goods services, which until then had been hauled by steam locomotives such as the Y class 0-6-0, E class 2-4-2T and later Dde class 4-6-2T.

In 1923 it introduced two electric locomotives of 620 hp (460 kW), built at VR's Newport and Jolimont Workshops with the same General Electric traction motors and related electrical equipment that had been installed in Melbourne's Tait and Swing Door electric suburban train sets, with the notable exception of the deadman's handle because they always operated with two crewmen, and because unnecessary activation of the emergency brake could damage goods loadings and delay following trains.

=== Production ===
The first two locomotives were built with a steeplecab-style appearance. Despite their appearance and unlike other steeplecab locomotives, they also included a large amount of the electrical equipment including the dynamotor in the driver's cab. The exposure of the driver to this electrical equipment led to them being nicknamed "electric chairs" among drivers. The two were designed as "E" Class engines, but issued to service with numbers (1100 and 1101) only.

==== Design modification ====
Following a 1926 review into suburban goods traffic a further fleet of engines were ordered to a modified design. These had a boxcab design on a longer frame with end platforms for crew access to the cabs, and two pantographs. These engines quickly gained the nickname "butterboxes", or occasionally "black engines" (Note: Sometime after the demise of the two steeplecabs, these locos also gained the sobriquet "electric chairs".) to distinguish them from all the "red rattlers". 1102 and 1103 entered service in 1928, followed by the rest of the class up to 1111 in 1929. It is thought that the original order was for only seven new engines, but some design documents refer to 1113 implying a total order of up to 12 additional units. Around the time of the first L Class locomotives, the butterbox engines started to have "E" letter plates affixed adjacent to the cabside and end handrail number plates as they were recovered from scrapped E Class steam engines. The two steeple-cab engines never had these "E" plates fitted.

=== Regular service ===
Upon introduction, the two steeple-cab locomotives proved the superiority of electric traction. They were able to operate together with multiple-unit train control, allowing a single crew to control both as an articulated locomotive with greater tractive effort than the Victorian Railways C class heavy goods locomotive, the most powerful steam locomotive on the VR at the time. Based on their success, suburban goods sidings were rapidly electrified and most suburban goods traffic utilised electric traction.

With the electrification of the Gippsland line as far as Traralgon in the 1950s, the range of the E class locomotives was similarly extended and they could be found shunting or hauling services along the line.

Locomotives 1100 to 1111 were painted in a plain black livery, matching that of the VR steam locomotive fleet. During the 1960s the ten box-cabs were painted in a variation of the blue and gold livery applied to the VR diesel fleet starting with E1111 on 13 November 1965. The locomotives were initially based at the Jolimont Workshops along with the suburban electric multiple unit fleet, as steam locomotives were housed at the North Melbourne Locomotive Depot. However with the opening of the new South Dynon Locomotive Depot in 1964, the entire E class fleet was relocated there in June 1968.

When the boxcab engines were fitted with automatic couplers the frames were raised by about two inches to gain clearance over the traction motors for the drawgear and associated equipment, and the buffers lowered by the same amount. Dual couplers were fitted, where the head of the automatic coupler could be rotated out of the way to expose the older type screwlink coupler set.

=== Demise ===
The first two steeple-cab locomotives were "slightly damaged" due to a runaway incident in Fairfield in 1954 and withdrawn. The damage would have been repairable, but the engines could not be fitted with automatic couplers (possibly due to the shorter frame) and so they were scrapped in July 1955. By this time, the electric locomotive fleet had been substantially expanded with 2,400 hp (1,790 kW) L class locomotives of a far more modern design.

The box-cab E class locomotives continued in service. However, during the 1970s, Victorian Railways conducted detailed studies of goods traffic and found that handling costs made the transport of high rated, small freight items unprofitable. As a result of these studies, rail freight operations were rationalised around block trains carrying bulk freight such as gravel, rice or grain, and suburban goods sidings were closed in favour of road freight services. Furthermore, the use of block trains greatly reduced the need for shunting locomotives. These operational changes rendered the ageing E class suburban electric locomotives surplus, and by 1981 scrappings had commenced.

As of 20 May 1987, E1106 and E1109 were allocated to Jolimont Workshops as yard pilots, but were rarely used in that role. E1102 was at Spotswood awaiting placement at the Newport Railway Museum, E1108 had been allocated to Steamrail Victoria as a yard pilot for ElecRail to use, and E1111 was stored, withdrawn, at Newport Workshops, while the other five had all been cut up.

== Preservation ==
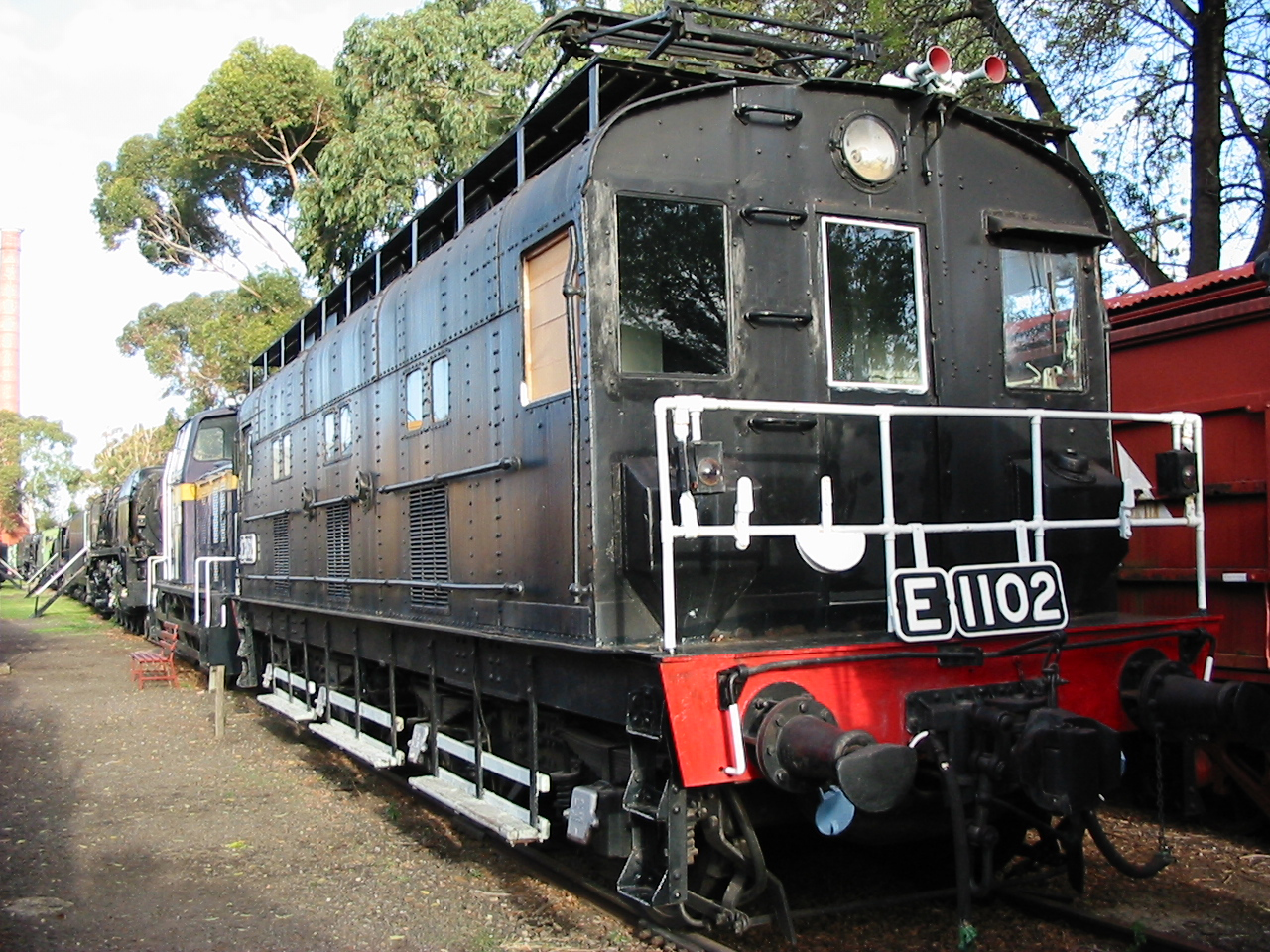
E 1102, preserved at the Newport Railway Museum

Four E class locomotives have survived into preservation. As of May 2007, their disposition was as follows:

- E 1102 is in static preservation at the Newport Railway Museum, wearing its original black livery
- E 1106 and 1108 were stored out of service by Steamrail Victoria
- E 1109 is also in the custody of Steamrail Victoria, and is a long term restoration project.
