= Swing Door (train) =

Wooden-bodied trains that operated in the suburbs of Melbourne, Australia

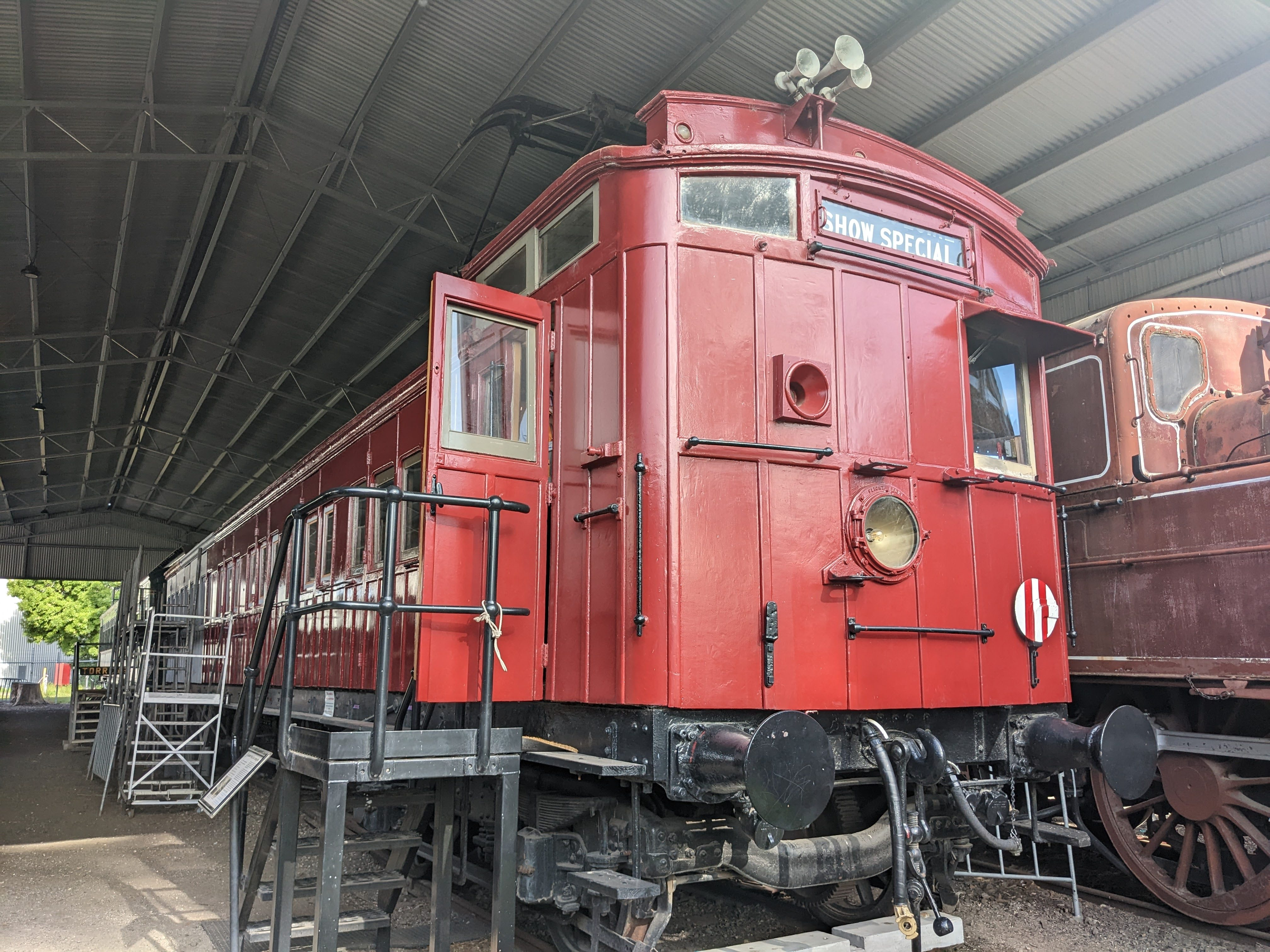
- Motor car 8M on display at the Newport Railway Museum. originally built as 9 ADAD.
- In service: 1887–1974
- Manufacturer: Victorian Railways
- Built at: Newport Workshops
- Replaced: Steam hauled carriages
- Constructed: 1887–1909 (built); 1919-1924 (converted)
- Entered service: 1887 (as locomotive-hauled carriages); 1919 (as EMU cars)
- Retired: 1974
- Scrapped: 1964-2015
- Number built: 144 motor cars, 32 driving trailers, 112 trailers
- Fleet numbers: 1-164M (Motor cars, with gaps), 1-32D (Driving trailers), 1-111T, 126T (Trailers)
- Operator: Victorian Railways

Specifications
- Articulated sections: None
- Maximum speed: 83 km/h (52 mph)
- Traction system: 4 x 105 kW GE239
- Electric system: 1500 V DC overhead
- Track gauge: 5 ft 3 in (1,600 mm)

Swing Door trains, commonly known as "Dogboxes" or "Doggies", were wooden-bodied electric multiple unit (EMU) trains that operated on the suburban railway network of Melbourne, Victoria, Australia.

Swing Door cars had outward-opening doors and were reasonably narrow, to ensure that two passing trains would not foul each other if doors were accidentally left open. At certain locations, clearances were tight and there are stories of Swing Door cars losing doors that were not closed. The fleet could be seen running in any arrangement, from one car, using a double-ended M car, to seven cars.

== History ==
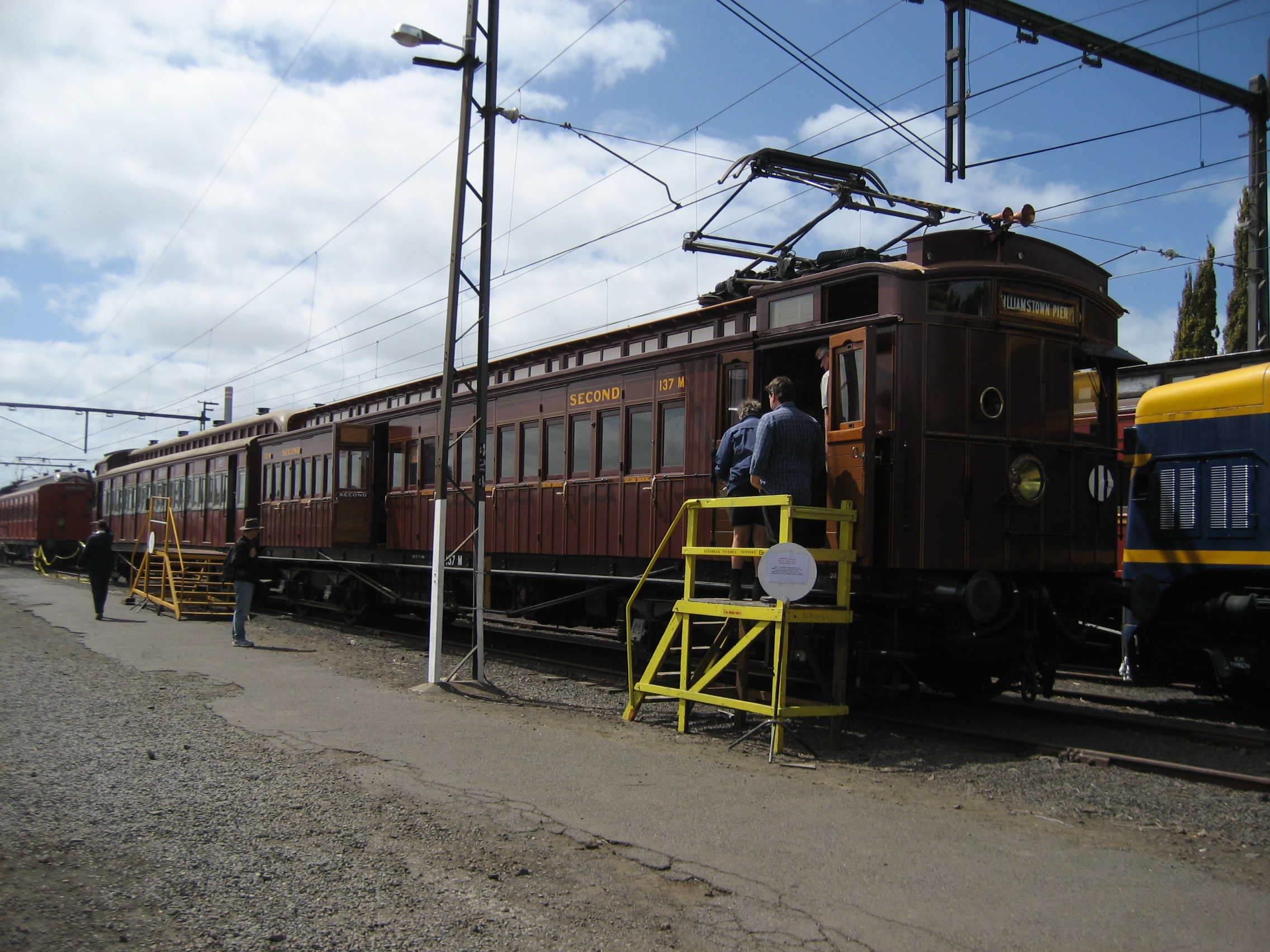
Restored Swing Door carriage at Newport Workshops, May 2007

The Swing Door carriages were originally steam-hauled bogie passenger cars, 45 feet (14 m) long or 50 feet (15 m) long, the majority of which were built between 1887 and 1893. When converted to electric traction between 1917 and 1924, the cars were extended by two compartments to a total length of 60 feet (18 m), and the driving (motor) cars were placed on new under-frames and bogies to accommodate the extra weight of the electrical equipment. The conversion process was suddenly halted in 1924, with partially converted cars being patched up and returned to service as steam-hauled carriages, with their original codes and numbers.

Converted Swing Door cars originally entered service with class codes such as 'AT', 'BCM', and 'ABCD', indicating both class and type. In 1921, that was largely simplified to 'M' (Motor car), 'T' (Trailer car) and 'D' (Driving trailer), the trailers being first class and motor cars second class, with some exceptions.

== Fleet ==
The maximum size of the Swing Door train fleet was:

- 144 'M' motor cars, numbered 1-164M, with gaps but including:
  - First class motor cars 1, 8, 15, 46, 65, 78AM (re-coded M after 1958)
  - Double-ended composite motor cars 155-159, 162-164ABM; 157-159, 162-164 were later converted to Parcel Vans 10-15CM
- 32 'D' driving trailers, numbered 1-32D
- 112 'T' First class and Second class 'BT' trailers, numbered 1-111, 126T (or BT)

=== Driving motors - AM, ACM, ABM, ABCM, BM, BCM, CM, M ===
==== M ====
It had been intended to convert 164 locomotive-hauled carriages, including 1st-class and 2nd-class cars - with and without guard's vans, as well as composite cars, to M (Motor) cars. When the conversion program was terminated, only 144 had been completed, leaving 20 gaps [5, 7, 22, 24, 27, 31, 33, 36, 38, 42, 45, 47, 52, 53, 55, 58, 59, 60, 61, 62] in the sequence. Each M car had 7 or 8 compartments, depending on the configuration of the original carriage, with three compartments per car usually allocated for smokers When initially issued to service, most were designated ACM and BCM denoting either 1st- or 2nd-class accommodation respectively. When that system was abandoned, motor cars all became 2nd class, except for six which were retained for special duties (AM), and the double-ended single units (ABM). On 10 February 1935, 18M and 44M were damaged in a serious collision at Croydon, and the bodies scrapped. The frames and electrical equipment were retained, and were rebuilt with new bodies of the current Tait design, being renumbered 442M and 443M.

==== AM ====
Motor cars 1, 8, 15, 46, 65, and 78, were built as ACM units, and retained as 1st-class AM cars until single-class suburban travel was introduced in 1958. In that form they were used, paired with a standard (2nd class) M car, as locomotives for E trains. Those trains ran to the end of the electrified sections of line at Lilydale and Frankston, hauling non-electrified passenger trains. At the terminus, the motor cars would be uncoupled and the remaining carriages split, with steam engines hauling each portion to Warburton or Healesville, or Mornington or Stony Point, respectively. Consequently, those six AM cars were configured for 850 Amperes current load rather than the normal 650, and the trailing motor car would often be cut-out whilst starting a train, to avoid excessive jolting. Those motor-pairs were also occasionally used for goods trains, and sometimes an ABM would be substituted for the AM car.

==== ABM ====
In the original electrification plan a group of ten single-unit, double-ended motor cars were proposed for use on the St Kilda and Port Melbourne lines during lower-patronage periods. Records at the time, however, only show plans of steam-hauled cars being converted to trailers, single-ended driving trailers or single-ended motors of various lengths, with no double-ended variants. By 1914, a conceptual diagram had been drawn up for double-ended composite motor cars, although no detail was given about the use of those vehicles if any were built. Without a guard lookout at the second driving end, the necessary marker lights were to be installed in a canopy attached to the end of the curved roof clerestory.

This group of vehicles were to be constructed similarly to the rest of the Swing Door motor fleet, with a large guard/driver compartment at one end. However, eight of them had a small driver-only compartment added at the opposite end, all but two being rounded in the same manner as the van end. There were eight compartments with room for ten passengers each and, from the van end, the layout was two 1st-class smoking compartments, two 1st-class non-smoking compartments, two 2nd-class non-smoking compartments, two 2nd-class smoking compartments, and the smaller driver's compartment. Like the rest of the suburban electric passenger fleet, the cars were painted all-over dark red-brown. The later livery was crimson with a black underframe, and moonstone grey along the window line. In the 1950s, this was changed to "tomato red", with moonstone grey on the window frames only.

Routes where those trains operated included Hawthorn-Kew, Camberwell-Ashburton (later Alamein) and Eltham-Hurstbridge. While they often operated individually, they were sometimes coupled to trailers and driving trailers in busier periods. 162M was a regular on the Kew roster.

When the first two cars, 2 and 3, entered service in mid-1917 they were classed ABCM. In the 1921 recoding, they became 156M and 157M respectively and, over the following years, cars 155M and 158M-164M were planned to be converted ex AC, BC or ABC cars. In the period 1921-1922, they all entered service as single-ended M-coded vehicles. The first to be converted to double-ended operation was 162M in 1926, followed by 159M, 163M and 164M in 1929 (around the same time 157M was recoded), 155M in 1932 and 158M in 1937, each recoded to ABM as they were released from the workshops. The last two conversions retained their flat ends at the non-guard end, instead of having a full rebuild applied.

160M and 161M were never modified (including the original, uneven compartment sizes) and ran as single-ended motors until their withdrawal in 1974 and 1969 respectively.

=== Parcel motors CM ===
156M was withdrawn from suburban service and reallocated as a spare Parcel Van in 1932, bolstering the Tait fleet of 1-5CM, though it was never coded CM.

After World War II, the population of Melbourne boomed, and with it the need for increased suburban parcel traffic capacity. Consequently, 157ABM was withdrawn from passenger service in 1955 and converted to parcel van 10CM. In 1961, dual-purpose Parcels and Overhead Inspection car 3CM was damaged, so 10CM had a raised cupola added in the middle for viewing of the overhead wiring.

162ABM, 163ABM and 164ABM were converted in a similar fashion to 155M, with new identities 11CM, 12CM and 13CM respectively, entering service in 1957 (11CM) and 1959 (12CM and 13CM). Also in 1959, 155ABM had the controls removed when it was converted to a workmen's sleeper carriage, becoming 70WW, the only motor carriage to be so-converted, and ran in that form until December 1975.

That left 158ABM and 159ABM as the only double-ended swing door electric cars in passenger service, though not for long. They were converted to further parcels coaches as a stopgap measure while 10CM and the repaired 3CM were busy with various electrification works, so the conversions were minimised. Instead of a full rebuild, the seats were removed and a walkway down the centre was cut between all the compartment partitions, but the cars did not have the sides replaced, and they stayed red. They were recoded to 14CM (1963) and 15CM (1964). The pair were withdrawn in 1970 and scrapped in 1971.

The remaining four Swing Door CMs, 10-13, were kept in service until 1986.

As at September 1987, 12CM, 13CM and 10CM were stabled with Tait 4CM at Spencer Street's parcels dock.

10CM is stored at Newport Workshops, awaiting restoration, and 13CM is stored at Moorooduc behind the Mornington Tourist Railway workshops. 12CM, formerly at Mornington, was moved to Newport as a chassis only in 2017 or 2018, and was being used as spare parts for 93M. Its body was scrapped some years prior, due to its poor condition.

=== 113M & 156M Jolimont Workshops yard pilots ===
156M was removed from normal passenger service in 1932, and replaced by 155M converted to ABM. It had its seating removed and the destination board replaced to show "parcels van", for use as a relief vehicle when any of the Tait CM coaches were unavailable. It spent the rest of its time as a pilot in Jolimont Yard, performing shunting around the sidings and in the workshops, and had been fitted with a second pantograph by 1948. It was never recoded to ABM and, although officially struck from the register in 1963 (along with 113M), it continued to operate in service well into the 1980s. By the late 1970s both vehicles had been repainted into a scheme similar to the parcels vans, and were officially allocated to the Jolimont yard pilot roster, with small lettering above the middle-side .

Near the end of its career, 156M was painted in all-over green in place of its previous blue livery, but retained yellow stripe along the sides. The ends were painted white with a yellow outline, and the standard Met yellow/green stripes along the lower edge of each end.

When 113M was painted into the new livery, the destination board was altered to read "Petronius 210", because staff apparently thought that the new livery represented an "illusion of progress". The motor worked with guard's van 31ZD when necessary, because that was fitted with both screw and automatic knuckle couplers at each end and so provided a transition to other types of rolling stock when required. According to Newsrail, 156M did not require the transition coupler. Photos show both 113M and 156M with combined screw and automatic couplers at the leading end.

Both vehicles have been preserved and are stored at Newport Workshops awaiting restoration.

=== Driving trailers – ACD, BCD, D ===
As part of the Swing Door conversion project, a fleet of driving-trailer carriages were constructed.

A total of 32 carriages were eventually built to that design. All weighed 26 long tons 10 cwt (59,400 lb or 26.9 t), with capacity for 30 smoking passengers and either 40 or 50 non-smoking passengers. Externally, all carriages were 8 ft 6 in (2.59 m) wide, and numbers 1-19 and 24-27D were 59 ft 9 in (18.21 m) over body, 61 ft 8 in (18.80 m) over buffers, while 20-23 and 28-32D were 9 3/4 in (250 mm) shorter in both dimensions. The first group of longer cars had their bogies spaced at 45 ft 6 1/2 in (13.881 m) and the second long group at 43 ft 3 1/2 in (13.195 m). All the shorter cars had bogies spaced at 40 ft 0 in (12.19 m).

They had seven or eight compartments, with a van on the end as a guard's compartment, as well as a small area reserved for the driver. The driver's compartment took the first 2 ft 10 1/2 in (0.876 m) and about half the width of the carriage, with the guard's elevated seat directly opposite. The van measured 5 ft 3 3/4 in (1.619 m) in the vast majority of D cars, exceptions being 14-16 (6 ft 3 1/4 in, 1.911 m), 20-21 and 23 (5 ft 6 15/16 in, 1.700 m) and 31-32 (5 ft 9 1/2 in, 1.765 m).

Passenger compartments varied in length and number. Each was rated for ten passengers, five on each bench, but the width of any given compartment could be anywhere from 5 ft 9 1/4 in (1.759 m) to 7 ft 3 7/8 in (2.232 m), with up to three sizes in any given vehicle.

As of 1915, there were 32 carriages destined to later become D type driving trailers. They were AC cars 5, 8, 10, 12, 17, 28, 29, 32, 34, 39, 52, 63, 70 and 139-143; ABC cars 17-20 and BC cars 6-7, 12, 29-30, 32, 36 and 39-41.

Between 1919-1921, all the AC 1st-class cars listed became ACD, 1st-class driving trailers, except Nos. 63 and 70; all BC 2nd-class cars listed bar 12BC became BCD, and none of the ABC cars went to a classed electric carriage. By 1924, all thirty-two carriages had become 1st-class D cars.

All the ex-AC types had seven compartments except for 63 and 70, and the ex-ABC and BC cars, which had eight compartments. In all cases, three compartments were reserved for smoking passengers and the rest for non-smoking.

The first Swing Door D car withdrawn was 21D in 1951. 26D and 9D followed in 1956 and 1957 respectively, and withdrawals of the Swing Door fleet accelerated from there. 18D and 22D were removed from service in 1962, and the next year took 4, 8, 10, 13, 20, 23 and 30. 3 and 5 in 1964, 7 and 11 in 1965, 14D in 1966 and 28D in 1967, then a short reprieve.

The final withdrawals were 1-2, 6, 15-17, 19, 25, 27 and 31-32 in 1973 and 12 and 29D in 1974.

24D stayed on the register until 1979, when it was formally withdrawn for preservation. In 1981, the car was involved in a runaway and sustained damage, which was later repaired.

32D was stored at Newport for a number of years, providing a useful source of spare parts for the restoration of 12BT and 24D, but it was scrapped in 2008. The car retained the wooden headstocks with which it was built, which would have made operational restoration difficult.

=== Trailers – AT, BT, T ===
This group encompasses one hundred and fifteen carriages, at different stages.

As of 1910, the bogie passenger compartment fleet consisted of a range of A, AB, and B type carriages of 45 ft and 50 ft lengths. They were respectively of the 1st, composite and 2nd class, with capacities around 70 passengers each. Most of the carriages dated from the late 1880s, though 51B and 54B entered service in 1900, 5A and 77B were built in 1902, and 63B and 66B were built in 1904 and 1905 respectively. From approximately 1908 to 1922, the bogie passenger fleet had underframes and bodies extended to increase the capacity of any given train, by wasting less space with couplers and buffers. Typically, two compartments were added to one end of each carriage, with a final over-body length of 57 ft 4 1/2 in (17.488 m). Originally, the majority of those carriages had seven compartments of 6 ft 3 1/8 in (1.908 m), with two more added at only 6 ft 0 11/16 in (1.846 m) each.

The four exceptions were carriages 49B, 51B, 20AB, and 79AB (108B from 1911). They had the same external dimensions, except that 49B and 51B were originally built with eight compartments of 6 ft 1 5/16 in (1.862 m) and a ninth added at 6 ft 11 1/2 in (2.121 m); 20AB and 79AB (108B) originally had seven compartments - three 1st class in the centre at 6 ft 11 in (2.11 m) each, flanked by two 2nd-class compartments of 5 ft 9 3/4 in (1.772 m) each. Later, two standard 6 ft 0 11/16 in (1.846 m) compartments were added at one end.

By the time carriages were being withdrawn from steam-hauled service for conversion to electric train trailers, the fleet comprised 25 x 1st-class cars in the range 1A to 149A (very few consecutive, but the majority numbered 100 or higher), and a further 89 2nd-class carriages, most in the number range 1-222 plus 129B and 134B. Those carriages were withdrawn and refitted with electric lighting and control cables for motor communication.

The conversions did not happen immediately but, by 1921, 1st-class trailers 1AT-12AT and 14AT-18AT were in service, and conversion work was progressing for the fleet of 2nd-class trailers 1BT through (roughly) 100BT. In 1921, it was decided that having class segregation among each class of the suburban fleet was too difficult to manage appropriately, and so the trailers all became 1st class and the motors all 2nd class. The AT carriages became 1-12T and 14-18T respectively, joined by 13T and 19-26T which had not been converted in time for the AT classification. BT cars became 27T to 111T, plus 126T. 109T, 110T, 111T, and 126T had been the pre-conversion odd vehicles 20AB, 49B, 51B, and 108B.

As Tait-type rolling stock entered service from 1925 onwards, some swing-door T cars were returned to steam passenger service, with modifications for electric running removed and gas lighting re-instated, although the extra compartments were retained. The first three were 87BT, 94BT and 96BT. It is likely that, if they had been converted to T trailer cars, they may have been numbered 113T, 120T and 122T, and it is possible that 126T had not been intended as the highest-numbered class member. On 29 January 1924, those three carriages were restored to their 1910 identities of 54, 63 and 66B respectively. All three cars had the same alternate compartment arrangement as 110T and 111T. However, in practice the numbers 112T-125T and 127T-199T were never filled with swing-door rolling stock.

In 1929, further carriages were deemed surplus to electric fleet requirements, and carriages 6, 19, 20, 21, 24, 26, 43, 39, 100, and 101T were converted back to B-class country carriages. However, instead of regaining their former numbers, they became 162-171B, those being the next available after the highest numbered B carriage at the time.

A further re-classification of 1st-class T cars was made in 1940, when a shortage of 2nd-class accommodation on the suburban system became evident, the situation being exacerbated by the introduction of petrol rationing during World War II. Fourteen of the swing-door trailer fleet were re-coded to BT, although they kept their T fleet numbers. That conversion involved the upholstered seats being swapped for 2nd-class wooden benches with cushions. The signage on the carriage sides was altered to reflect that. The carriages so treated were 4, 8 and 12 in 1940, followed by 29, 36, 38, 41, 42, 45, 64, 77, 79, 85 and 87 in 1941.

In 1954, some of the cars converted from electric stock in 1929 were returned to the Swing Door electric fleet. 162B and 163B returned to their previous identities of 6T and 19T respectively, but 165B, 168B, 171B and 169B became T cars 20, 21, 24, and 26, ignoring their previous identities of 21, 43, 101, and 39T.

In 1958, one-class travel on Melbourne suburban rail system was introduced, meaning that the fourteen BT trailers no longer needed to be different from the rest of the fleet, and all cars were progressively fitted with upholstered seating as the new standard. However, those cars kept their BT code, and they were joined by seventeen other vehicles to make a total 31 BT trailers. Those later conversions (and probably the earlier ones as well) included a shunter's cock being added, similar to Tait G cars, to aid coupling three-car units (M-T-BT-) to four-car blocks (M-T-T-M). That resulted in 7-car Swing Door trains being formed as M-T-BT+M-T-T-M, releasing the G carriages for other services.

The first two withdrawals of T Swing Door cars were in 1953 and 1956, with 46T and 86T respectively. 26 (ex 39), 65, 70 and 166T were withdrawn in 1957, and twelve cars in 1958. Mass withdrawals started at the end of 1961 with 91T, and an average of ten cars per year were withdrawn from then until the end of 1974. Some cars were converted to workmen's sleepers, but the majority had valuable fittings removed and were railed to Allendale on the former North Creswick - Daylesford line, where they were burned. Withdrawals in that period averaged eight cars per year. There were fewer withdrawals in the period 1967-1972 while the new Hitachi fleet was designed and introduced into service, but many more were withdrawn either side of that period. The last two cars in service, withdrawn during the first half of 1974, were 76BT and 80T.

The carriages converted from steam to electric then back to steam but which did not return to electric later on - 54B, 64B, 66B, 164B, 166B, 167B and 170B - were withdrawn largely in line with others of that class.

=== Set configuration ===
When the conversion project was halted, the Swing Door fleet equalled 32 Driving Trailers, 112 regular Trailers, 144 Motors (including the double-ended (ABM) and high-powered (AM) motors). The core of the Tait fleet had also been delivered by 1927.

For the majority of the day, four-car blocks would have run most services, with the single motor cars running short-distance trains, such as to Ashburton and Hurstbridge. The pairs were reserved for flatter lines, such as the like Newport-Altona branch, sometimes in pairs (M-D+M-D) in place of a regular four-car block. In peak hours on quieter lines, the standard block was supplemented with a pair. On the busiest routes, a three-car unit would be attached. During the Easter and Christmas seasons, the Tait G cars (T-type trailers with gas lighting installed, as well as electric) would be withdrawn from suburban service and used to provide extra capacity on country trains. Double-block sets of M-T-T-M+M-T-T-M were never used in normal service.

==== 1956 roster ====
As of 1956, 218 Swing Door carriages were rostered for regular use (in conjunction with 584 Tait carriages). At the time 282 Swing Door vehicles were available, after accounting for 18M and 44M converted to Tait, three trailers returned to steam-hauled use, 122M and 123M withdrawn 1956, 156M permanently allocated to Jolimont Yard and 157M in use as a parcels van.

These could be divided into three main groups - St Kilda and Port Melbourne, Box Hill, and Clifton Hill, plus a handful of additional vehicles.

The St Kilda and Port Melbourne group had a total of 37 vehicles allocated, organised as three sets M-D-D-M-D-T-M, two M-D-D-M-D-M and two M-D.

For Box Hill, to Lilydale and Upper Ferntree Gully, 14 sets were operated as M-T-T-M-G-T-M (all Swing Door except the Tait G car), plus two sets of ABM-D for Camberwell to Alamein shuttles, totalling 88 vehicles out of 102.

Trains from Princes Bridge through Clifton Hill to Hurstbridge and Thomastown were formed by 13 M-T-T-M-BT-T-M sets plus three more with a Tait G substituting for the BT, and a set of M-Tait G-ABM for the Eltham to Hurstbridge shuttles, adding to 111 out of 115 carriages.

Four AM motors were paired with regular M motors for use on the E trains to Healesville/Warburton and Stony Point/Mornington, though two of those sets included a pair of Tait cars, and Altona had two Swing Door motors coupled to Tait driving trailers.

The total roster required 114 of 126 available M cars, 93 of 97 T, 3 of 6 ABM, 4 of 6 AM, 13 of 15 BT but only 19 of 32 D.

== Equipment ==
General Electric traction equipment was fitted to the trains, of the same type as that in the Tait trains and enabling the trains to be operated in mixed sets using multiple-unit train control.

When shunting other classes of electric multiple unit around Jolimont and Flinders Street yards, two drivers would be used (one each end) to minimise turnaround time between each movement within the shunting process, and they could communicate using the guard's bell. However, swing-door sets did not have those bells provided, "so communication was made by lifting the pantograph valve the required number of times - this made a sound at each end of the train."

Internal carriage lighting in the Tait and Swing-door sets was provided as three rows of six light globes, wired in series; if one globe in a set failed, the other five on that circuit would also lose power. However, identifying the failed globe was usually straightforward as the glass tended to fog up.

== Conversions and alterations ==
Six Swing Door M cars were converted to parcels vans (numbered 10CM to 15CM), and two M cars, 156M and 113M, were modified for use as shunters in the Jolimont Workshops.

== Retirement ==
From the late 1950s, Swing Door trains were replaced by the new Harris EMU trains. An announcement in 1958 indicated that was to occur within five years, but Swing Door trains remained in service for a further fifteen years or so. The last run to Brighton Beach took place on 30 April 1971, with the 5:23pm run from Flinders Street, formed by 4M-56T-2BT-80T-32T-145M, with a nominally empty run back to Flinders Street. The final seven-car set, 137M-71T-6T-67M-12BT-34T-138M, was withdrawn from the Princes Bridge (Epping and Hurstbridge) routes on 28 February 1973, and the last run on the Altona branch took place on 2 October 1973. The final regular use of a Swing Door train was on the Port Melbourne roster in the morning peak of 4 December 1973.

During their long service lives, many motor cars had their original fabricated bogies replaced by newer cast-frame bogies. Cast-frame bogies from scrapped Swing Door trains were recycled for use under the Y class diesel locomotives built in the 1960s.

In 1967, trailer cars 12BT and 13BT were set aside for preservation, partially on the grounds that they had retained their ornate recessed panelling. Motor car 8M, with unique curved wooden panelling, has been preserved as a static exhibit at the Newport Railway Museum, without its electrical equipment, and the condition of 13BT led to it being exchanged for driving trailer 24D.

A special "farewell" day for Swing Door trains was held on 26 January 1974, with set 107M-32D-24D-137M running shuttles between Flinders Street and Port Melbourne. After the final run, the set ran empty to Newport Workshops for preservation. The parcels vans remained in service until the mid-1980s, and the two workshop shunters until the 1990s.

== Preservation ==
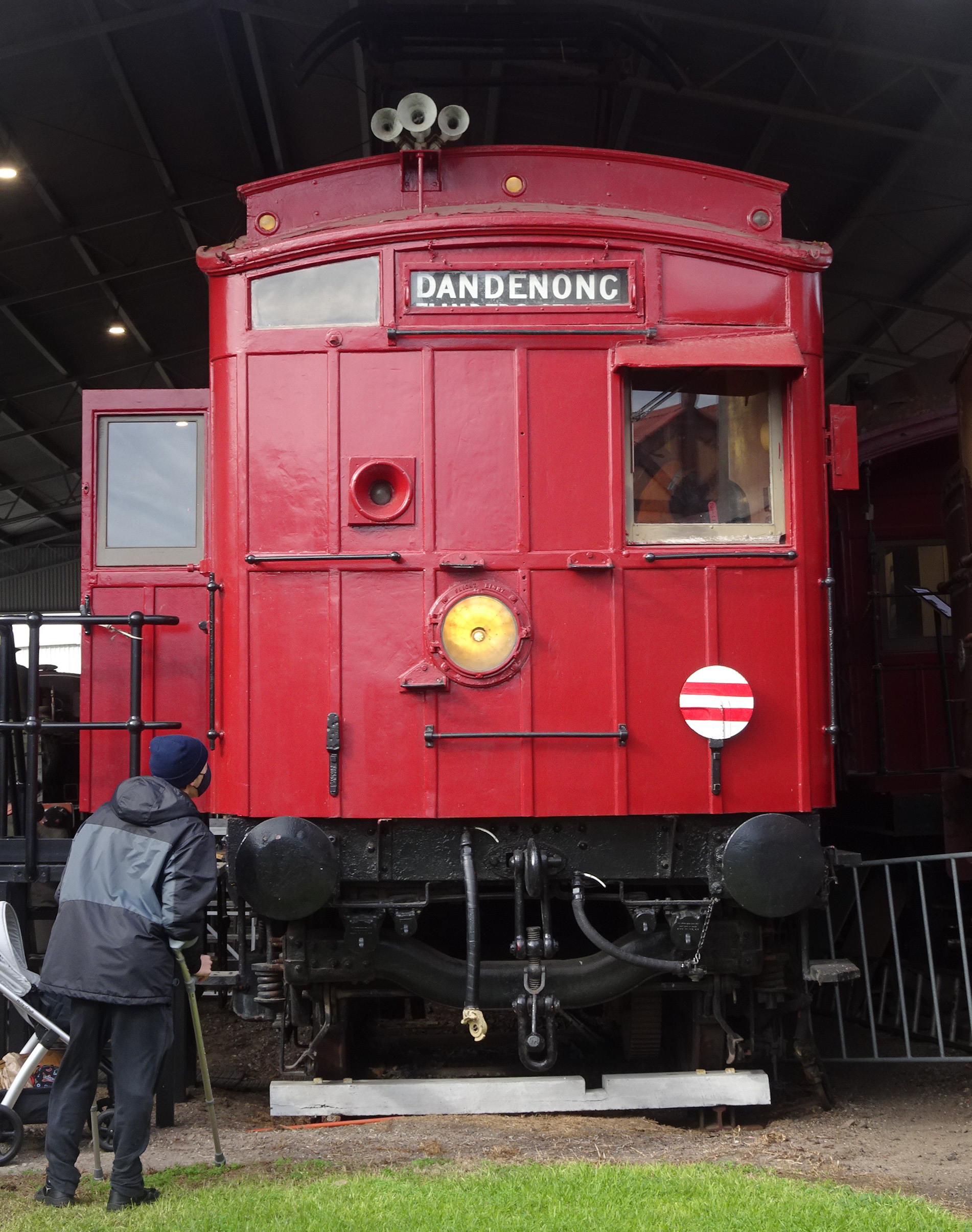
Motor car 8M at the Newport Railway Museum in 2022

Only a handful of cars survived into preservation. Newsrail noted that fourteen cars were purchased by a person from Bendigo, and some of these are likely in the list below.

- 8M: Newport Railway Museum, static.
- 19M: Located at Acacia Gardens caravan park in Mooroopna.
- 69M: Located at Acacia Gardens caravan park.
- 78M: Body was privately owned, until it was destroyed by fire at Myers Flat.
- 93M: Currently with ElecRail at Newport for restoration to operational condition.
- 113M: Owned by VicTrack, in the care of Elecrail, although stored in East Block. Former Jolimont Pilot.
- 133M: Body privately owned, in Benalla. Photo show it being restored
- 139M: Originally at Old Sandhurst Town theme park near Bendigo. Moved to Acacia Gardens caravan park in Mooroopna in 2009.
- 143M: Body privately owned, near Myers Flat.
- 156M: Owned by VicTrack, in the care of Elecrail, although stored in East Block. Double ended, Former Jolimont Pilot.
- 94BT: Survived as Workman's Sleeper 30 WW, Currently unknown condition, last known location was at Benalla.
- 10CM: Owned by VicTrack, stored at Newport. In 1991, was operational at Seymour Railway Heritage Centre (formerly the Seymour Loco Steam Preservation Group).
- 12CM: Previously was stored Mornington Tourist Railway till body was scrapped in 2018 and its underframe was scrapped a few years later.
- 13CM: Stored at Mornington Tourist Railway. Was formerly 164M.
- 103T: Two trailer cars survive as Workman's Sleepers in Yackandandah in the original station precinct, along with a ZL Van. The two carriages are 27WW (103 T) & 175 WW (35 T).
- 35T: As Listed Above

A further four carriages, 107M, 12AT, 24D and 137M, were owned by VicTrack and stored at Newport Workshops West Block under the care of Elecrail. The two motor cars were operational and the trailer car was "a few weeks away from restoration" when, at about 1am on 4 March 2015, a fire caused significant damage to that part of the complex. The remains of 12AT and 24D were cut up, and the frame, undergear and bogies from 137M were retained pending assessment. The undergear was stored at Newport till February 2024 when it was sent for scrap. The cab of 107M was the only section of the body to have survived.

- 32D: Was stored for spare parts or future restoration at Newport until 2008, when it was scrapped by VicTrack.

Preserved Swingdoor History
Built	First Number	Passenger Number	Last Renumbered	Final Number	History	Current Status
09.05.1888 by Newport Workshops	9 ADAD	8M	Mar 1958	8M		
18.09.1888 by Newport Workshops	11 ADAD	9M	1973	19M		
18.07.1905 at Newport Workshops by Herbert & Party	80 ADAD	69M	30 Sep 1924	69M		
23.02.1889 by Pickles & Son, Sandhurst	101 AA	78M	Apr 1957	78M		
20.04.1889 by Pickles & Son, Sandhurst	110 AA	93M	31 Oct 1924	93M		
12.10.1888 by Pickles & Son, Sandhurst	85 AA	107M	31 Oct 1924	107M	Preserved by Elecrail. It ran Specials until 2004, it was set on fire in 2015	Everything survived with only cab remaining, now used for parts for 93M
25.08.1888 by P Bevan & Sons	35 AA	113M	31 Jan 1925	113M		
30.10.1905 by Newport Workshops by Owens & Party	17 BDBD	133M	17 Sep 1921	133M		
26.10.1907 Newport Workshops by Herbert & Party	22 BDBD	137M	27 Feb 1922	137M	Preserved by Elecrail. It ran Specials until 2004, it was set on fire in 2015	Only frames and bogies survived, Now stored in Lot 100?
01.11.1907 Newport Workshops by Herbert & Party	23 BDBD	138M	27 Feb 1922	138M		
26.10.1907 Newport Workshops by Herbert & Party	24 BDBD	139M	17 Sep 1921	139M		
04.11.1907 Newport Workshops by Herbert & Party	28 BDBD	143M	13 Sep 1921	143M		
04.10.1900 Newport Workshops by Coleman & Party	2 BDBD	156M	31 Oct 1923	156M		
14.03.1901 Newport Workshops by Loach & Party	3 BDBD	157M	7 Oct 1955	10CM		
28.11.1905 by Newport Workshops	16 BDBD	163M	5 Aug 1959	12CM		
02.10.1905 Newport Workshops by Scott & Party	18 BDBD	164M	22 Dec 1959	13CM		
11.04.1892 by Newport Workshops	15 BB	35T	3 Feb 1971	175WW		
15.09.1904 by Newpt, Herbert & Party	63 BB	94BT	6 Jun 1957	30WW		
05.12.1890 by P Ellis Sandhurst	198 AA	103T	29 Jan 1958	27WW		
