= Victorian Railways fixed wheel passenger carriages =

Australian railway carriages

- Manufacturer: Victorian Railways
- Built at: Newport Workshops, others
- Family name: Fixed-wheel stock
- Constructed: From 1855
- Entered service: From 1858
- Number built: Around 2,000 total
- Number in service: 0
- Number scrapped: Most
- Operator: Victorian Railways
- Depot: All
- Line served: All

Specifications
- Doors: Swing
- Track gauge: 5 ft 3 in (1,600 mm)

The first passenger carriages of the Victorian Railways (VR) were fixed-wheel, with a mixture of first- and second-class bodies on either four- or six-wheeled underframes. They were built to the British side-loading, swing-door, cross bench compartment (non-corridor) style; later a saloon style was used to a limited extent, featuring fewer doors per side and perimeter seating - which increased total capacity by allowing more standing passengers.

Initial designs had some common themes: A and B type carriages were for first- and second-class travellers; C indicated third-class initially, though later was re-allocated for flat wagons to transport horse-drawn carriages, and later still for hearse vans (the first three of which had been modified from E class mail vans); D was used for guards' vans, E for mail vans, and F for horse boxes. The first vehicles were built on four-wheeled underframes, with some later designs (mostly first-class) being built on six-wheel underframes. Some cars were built locally, while others were imported. Between 1860 and 1880 the Victorian Railways took-over a number of private railway operators, and their rollingstock was absorbed into the VR fleet, being renumbered to suit. This explains why records show some cars as being built in 1855, even though the Victorian Railways did not start operating until 1858.

At first, fleet numbers of each type of carriage were generally kept consecutive with no regard for differing capacities or axle loads. When a vehicle was scrapped, either a new one would be built with the same number, or another existing car would be renumbered to fill the gap.

Some later cars were built or re-coded with multiple letters, such as AB, AD, BD and ABD. Another category was introduced for older cars which allowed them to be used in restricted service; a superscript H added to the class to indicate Holiday traffic - B^{H}. This H superscript was initially just a clerical note next to the code, although it later became an official part of the code. Initially only second-class carriages were marked as such.

When bogie carriages were added to the fleet, they initially were allocated vacant numbers in the appropriate class series, one of the first examples being 70 A. From 1886 the bogie cars were re-coded as A^{A}, B^{B}, or AB^{AB}; it is thought that this was necessary due to mix-ups with carriage capacities. Twenty seven bogie carriages of the American end-loading saloon design had been built for the Victorian Railways between 1874 and 1887 (thereafter, so-called dog box bogie cars were built), along with at least one bogie double-saloon car inherited from the former private suburban railway company (those cars were re-classed about the same time). As bogie carriages displaced their fixed-wheel predecessors, the older cars were reassigned to other duties. In particular, with the majority of bogie carriages being first-class, first-class fixed-wheel vehicles were downgraded to second-class and re-coded as 'B'.

Cars still in service in the 1940s were converted to workmen's sleepers known as WS or W Class; three of the latter were placed on bogie underframes and became WW class.

== First-Class Carriages A/X/XH ==
This group ranged from numbers 1 to 274, although over 100 numbers were recycled at least once. Most of the cars were similar to each other; typically four or five compartments with doors either side and long bench seats across the width of the carriage, allowing for a total of forty or fifty passengers per car; with a curved roof and a four- or six-wheeled underframe.

The cars were built from the 1850s to the 1880s, with a handful built after that and a large number obtained from other railways: 17 A and 18 A came from the Geelong Railway; 117 A to 156 A were ex-English cash 22 to 65, though a handful had already been scrapped; and 105 A as well as the majority of 163 A to 255 A were ex-South Suburban and Hobsons Bay stock.

In the 1910 en-masse renumbering of all passenger stock found the letters A, B and D replaced with X, Y and Z respectively. So the A cars mostly became X class; two, numbers 43 and 44 (ex 54 A and 61 A) were converted to XH on account of their condition, and restricted to occasional traffic only. The resulting post-1910 fleet numbered 1 to 42 X and 45 to 82 X. Cars 1 to 41 had been built as A Class but re-coded to B class previously. In 1913, when the Deniliquin and Moama Railway Company was taken over, one of their first-class cars was renumbered to 43 A to recycle that number.

As older cars started to wear-out and new designs came into use (in particular the new bogie fleet), some were converted to other purposes. Many were downgraded to composite, second-class only, or second-class holiday cars, with codes AB, B, or BH (later XY, Y, or YH) respectively. Other cars became workmen's sleepers (W), with a handful of those lasting to 1980. There were no first class holiday traffic cars coded as AH, but two cars, 54 A and 61 A, became 43 XH and 44 XH.

=== Significant cars ===
- Exhibition Car - 1 A. Survives as a workman's sleeper WW 128. The body is located in a paddock at Raywood, near the 25 km post north of Bendigo.
- Vision Test Car - 4 A. Number kept as an identity for tracking purposes only.
- 67 A and 68 A later became State/Ministerial cars, and 69 A became the Dynagraph car.
- 43 XH was previously 54 A; became 146 W in 1913, then scrapped 1931.
- 44 XH was previously 61 A; became 382 YH in late 1910, then scrapped 1929.

=== Ministerial Cars ===
Edinburgh later Mitta Mitta
- Manufacturer: Victorian Railways
- Built at: Williamstown Workshops
- Constructed: 1899
- Refurbished: 1910
- Number built: 1
- Number scrapped: 1
- Capacity: 23
- Operator: Victorian Railways

Specifications
- Car body construction: Timber
- Car length: 28 ft 2 in (8.59 m) (Ministerial cars); 47 ft 7.5 in (14.52 m) over body, 55 ft 6 in (16.92 m) over coupling points (Edinburgh)
- Width: 8 ft 3.25 in (2.52 m)
- Height: 12 ft 10.5 in (3.92 m)
- Weight: 22 LT 2 cwt 0 qtr (22.45 t)
- Bogies: 15 ft 5 in (4.70 m) as Ministerial cars, later 37 ft 1.5 in (11.32 m) between bogie centres, 8 ft (2.44 m) axle spacing
- Braking system: Westinghouse
- Coupling system: screw, later autocouplers
- Track gauge: 5 ft 3 in (1,600 mm)

Cars 67 A and 68 A, built at Williamstown Workshops in 1880, were rebuilt as Ministerial Cars 2 and 1 respectively in 1894. The two cars were externally identical, but Ministerial No.2 was reversed against No.1 so the two end platforms met in the middle, and the two cars had slightly different interiors. Each car had nine window-panels per side, plus the end platform section. Ministerial No.1 had its access door at the second panel; the diagram shows that section as the Lavatory, but it was not connected to the water closet and apparently acted more as a vestibule. There was an adjacent WC and then a large saloon, with a table, four seats and a three-seater bench, then the 2 ft 3 in (0.69 m) end platform. Ministerial No.2 was something of a mirror image internally, with its end platform then saloon with a smaller table, two long benches for five each, a WC on the same side as Ministerial No.1, and another lavatory/vestibule with access doors.

At some point each car had one axle removed and replaced with a short bogie. Ministerial No.1 had the bogie placed at the platform end, while Ministerial No.2 had the bogie placed under the lavatory/vestibule end. The bogies had a wheelbase of 4 ft 10 in (1.47 m)

In 1899 the two cars were lifted from their underframes and placed on a single bogie underframe, and the new combined carriage was called Edinburgh. In this form the car had three saloons, separated by a unisex lavatory and a kitchen, and flanked by 2 ft 3 in (0.69 m) compartments. The outer two saloons were 6 ft 10.75 in (2.10 m) with up to 8 seats, while the central saloon was 12 ft 10.5 in (3.92 m) with four seats, a bench and the buffet counter.

The car was renamed Mitta Mitta on 3 December 1910, with a complete internal rebuild. The central compartment was converted to a kitchen, and the other two saloons were each split into two 6 ft 10 in (2.08 m) dining tables for six, with a total capacity of 24 diners.

In July 1924 the car was modified again and renamed the Vision Test Car. It was once again cleared out, and this time there was no remnant of the earlier three-compartment design. From one end platform, there was a 7 ft 3 in (2.21 m) compartment that served as the doctor's living quarters while the car was touring the state. The majority of the car was devoted to the testing room, as a single 22 ft 6.25 in (6.86 m) compartment with various tables and chairs for different tests and a dark room separated by a curtain. The remainder of the car was split into three waiting rooms with folding seats; these rooms were 3 ft 6.625 in (1.08 m) 7 ft 3.25 in (2.22 m) and 5 ft 11.25 in (1.81 m) respectively.

The car was scrapped on 29 May 1939, and replaced with the former dining car Wimmera as the new Medical and Test Vision Car.

== First-Class Carriages with a Guard's Van AD/YZ ==
These vehicles entered service between 1881 and 1886, numbered between 1 and 58, however many cars are missing from the list. From the data it appears that the class was re-organised in 1886, with many vehicles in service prior to 1886 being scrapped and their numbers left vacant for replacements that were never built.

Cars 3, 7, 17, 18, 24, 30, 37 to 44, 55 to 57 were never in service after 1886. Cars 1, 2 and 4 entered service about 1886 as replacements for earlier cars; car 4 AD is now 69 YZ, preserved in running condition at Castlemaine. Between 1887 and 1904, these vehicles were converted to BD, at about the rate of about two or three per year, with twelve conversions for 1891. In the 1910 recoding the sole remaining vehicle in the class, 4 AD, was recoded to 1 XZ. In February 1914, 1 XZ was relettered to 69 YZ.

== Composite First- & Second-Class Carriages AB/ABH/XY/XYH ==
These cars were mixed first- and second-class versions of the standard fixed wheel rollingstock. First-class compartments were usually slightly wider, allowing for more legroom.

AB type carriages were built between 1859 and 1887, with a further ten converted from other classes in 1892. As a result, the total fleet was in the range 1 AB to 157 AB.

From 1888 to 1904, as patronage increased and mixed-purpose carriages became less useful, the class was converted, mainly to second-class-only (and a small number to TBO, a second-class van with a booking office installed), though a handful became workmen's sleeping accommodation. Car 118 AB was recoded to 118 ABH in about 1900, for holiday traffic.

The 1910 re-coding saw the leftover cars converted from AB to XY; 118 ABH became 15 XYH, and was removed from service in 1913. Otherwise, the number range was 1 to 42 XY, although about five cars were never converted, and were scrapped or put to other uses.

Between 1911 and 1958, the XY cars were progressively scrapped or converted to other uses (mainly workmen's vehicles of the W-series), the last being 25XY on 29 July 1958.

It is thought that the derelict carriage body near Manor, south of Werribee, is a former XY carriage. It survives as a wooden frame, and sadly in recent years had been blown over by the wind. Another carriage body, from 5 XY, is thought to be in Hampton, having been recorded as being in good condition in 1996.

== Composite First- & Second-Class Carriages with a Guard's Van ABD/XYZ ==
As car designs were being mixed and matched to find a better balance between offering patronage and weight hauled, combination carriages became more common. Part of the car was a guard's van and luggage area, with the rest being second- and first-class passenger compartments. The ABD type was a result of this experimentation, with nine cars built by 1886, numbered from 1 ABD to 18 ABD. These vans were used on mixed trains and smaller branch line trains.

Between 1889 and 1891, three cars were transferred to other services. 8 ABD was most interesting - it was reclassified as 380 B in 1889, which suggests that it was originally a standard carriage with one compartment being converted for use as a van section, or that the van was fitted with seating and the cupola section blanked off or removed. Twelve more of a different design were built new during 1893/1894. Five were transferred to other service between 1898 and 1903. In the 1910 renumbering, the thirteen remaining vehicles were re-coded to XYZ; numbers were altered to fill gaps at the same time.

One XYZ car was scrapped in 1912. An extra vehicle was not converted until 1922 when 12 YZ became 14 XYZ. The class was gradually withdrawn from service between 1928 and 1939.

== Second-Class Carriages B/BH/X/XH ==
The group of Second Class carriages were coded 'B'. They were placed in service from 1858 to 1886, with a sole (experimental) second-class carriage built in 1893. From 1886 onwards, First Class carriages coded A were downgraded to Second. The introduction of bogie carriages to country service cascaded stock, allowing older vehicles to be scrapped or converted to works cars. From the mid-1890s (and possibly earlier), older stock was marked with a 'H' to indicate 'Holiday' traffic; this stock was stored for use until busy holiday times of the year. The cars were eventually coded BH. Similarly to the A/AH group, cars added to the H group retained their original fleet number in the group 1 to 479. The 'H' grouping was all done by 1902 - this is to say that no more cars were down rated from B to BH after about 1902. In the 1910 renumbering the 'B' class was re-coded to 'Y', and BH cars re-coded to YH. To remove gaps in the numbers caused by conversions and scrappings, the carriages were renumbered as they were re-coded. The Y/YH group were numbered 1 to 385. The addition of a letter 'H' next to the code, but not part of it, was the initial indicator; the 'H' later became part of the code from the 1900s. The H was not included in traffic reports.

The cars were progressively removed from service between 1911 and 1935 by scrapping or conversions to W works sleepers. The remaining few cars, sited at loco depots, were removed and scrapped by 1956. One car survived to 1963 as a railmotor trailer on a distant branch line. The car 309 Y, was restored and is now part of the 'Veteran train'. Most of these cars were converted to W works sleepers between 1912 and 1956. Other cars were removed and scrapped.

Y numbers: 4, 7, 17, 20, 22, 30-31, 33, 38, 52, 54, 63, 65-69, 77, 89, 91, 93-96, 98, 100, 102-208, 212, 213, 217-224, 230-247, 250-251, 253, 257-258, 267, 270-272, 276-279, 288-289, 292, 294, 299, 300, 302-303, 306, 309, 315, 320-322, 325-326, 329, 330, 333, 336-337, 339, 342-344, 347-348, 350-351, 357-358, 360-361, 363, 366, 369, 371-378, 383 and 385.

YH numbers: 1-3, 5-16, 18-19, 21, 23, 25-29, 32, 34-37, 39-51, 53, 55-62, 64, 70-76, 78-88, 90, 92, 97, 99, 101, 209-211, 214-216, 225-229, 248-249, 252, 254-256, 259-266, 268-269, 273, 275, 280-287, 290-293, 295-298, 301, 304-305, 307-308, 310-314, 316-319, 323-324, 327-328, 331-332, 334-335, 338, 340-341, 345-346, 349, 352-356, 359, 364-365, 367-368, 370, 379-382 and 384.

== Second-Class Carriages with a Guard's Van BD/BDH/YZ/YZH ==
Between 1883 and 1887 there were twenty six vehicles placed into service as BD. From 1887 to 1904 a further forty six vehicles were converted to BD from classes AD and ABD; the resulting number group was 1 to 69. About 1895, BD cars 43 and 67 became 43 BDH and 67 BDH. They were retained for holiday traffic and stored at other times. In the 1910 renumbering they were re-coded to YZH. The last car 67 YZH was removed from service in 1913. In the 1910 renumbering the class BD was re-coded to YZ with the same numbers retained. Some vans were converted into the class in the late 1900s. In 1922, 12 YZ was converted to 14 XYZ. By the 1930s, the only vans left were stationed at loco depots on 'Breakdown trains'. One van survived as a railmotor trailer in the Mallee district.

== Guard's Vans ==
Fixed-wheel guard's vans
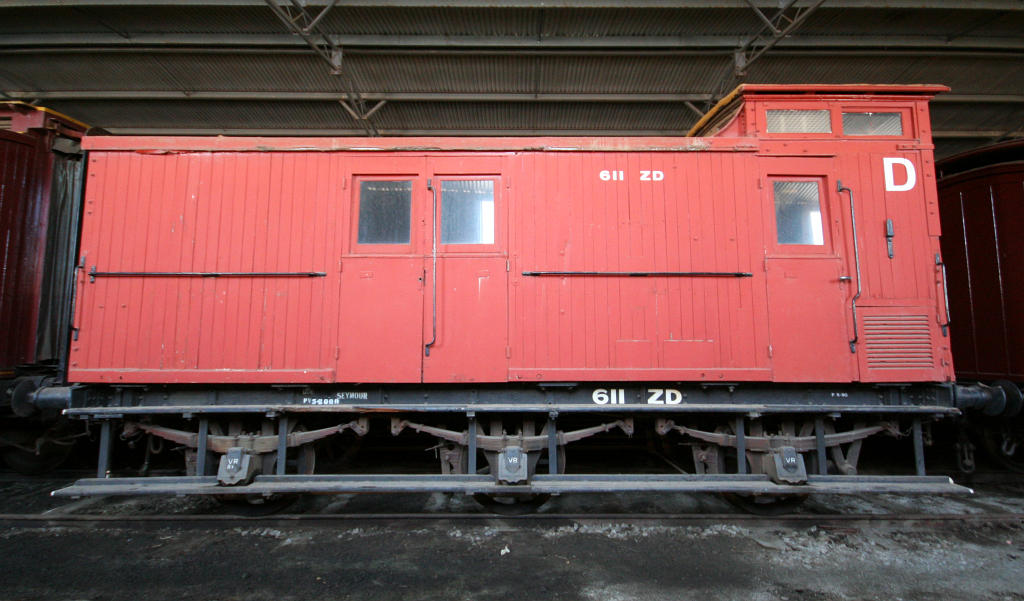
- Van 611 ZD, in storage at the Seymour Railway Heritage Centre
- Manufacturer: Victorian Railways
- Built at: Newport Workshops
- Family name: Fixed-wheel carriages
- Replaced: Each other
- Constructed: From 1851
- Refurbished: Each other
- Number built: Roughly 750
- Number scrapped: Roughly 700
- Design code: D, Z
- Fleet numbers: 1D-265D; 1Z-33Z & 35Z-746Z
- Capacity: 4 LT 0 cwt 0 qtr (4.06 t) (3-axle Z/ZL); 2 LT 0 cwt 0 qtr (2.03 t) (ZD & two-axle Z/ZL)
- Operators: Daylesford Spa Country Railway, Victorian Goldfields Railway and Steamrail Victoria

Specifications
- Car body construction: Timber
- Car length: 24 feet 2 inches (7.37 m) over body, 27 feet 6 inches (8.38 m) over coupling points
- Width: 8 feet 0 inches (2.44 m)
- Height: 12 feet 6 1/2 inches (3.82 m)
- Wheelbase: 7 feet 6 inches (2.29 m) between axles; 15 feet 0 inches (4.57 m) total and for four-wheeled vans
- Maximum speed: 50 mph (80 km/h)
- Weight: 10 LT 8 cwt 0 qtr (10.57 t) unloaded (Z & ZL) 14 LT 0 cwt 0 qtr (14.22 t) unloaded (ZB) 13 LT 8 cwt 0 qtr (13.62 t) unloaded (ZD)
- Axle load: 3 LT 7 cwt 1 1/3 qtr (3.42 t) unloaded
- Braking system: Westinghouse air brake
- Coupling system: Screw, later autocouplers
- Track gauge: 5 ft 3 in (1,600 mm); two on 4 ft 8 1/2 in (1,435 mm) standard gauge

These fixed-wheeled vehicles were the primary group of guard's vans built for the Victorian Railways. They were built nearly continuously, from 1858 to 1891. The code 'D' was applied on a van, as late as 1907.

These vans were attached at the rear of trains. As there was no continuous brake, the guard at the rear assisted stopping by using the handbrake.

When construction of the 'D' vans stopped, the number group was from 1 D to 265 D. However, there had been far more vans that this actually built, because many of the earlier vans had been scrapped and replaced by new vans which took the same numbers. Eventually around 750 vans were constructed (not counting duplicates); and from 1888 bogie vehicles were constructed with a central cupola and two ends matching the D type design; these vans were called the D^{D} class, later C class.

In the 1890s some vans were rebuilt from four to six wheels.

=== DH, ZH vans ===
Short-bodied, fixed-wheel guard's vans
- Manufacturer: Victorian Railways
- Built at: Williamstown Workshops & Newport Workshops
- Number built: 4
- Number scrapped: 4
- Design code: DH, ZH
- Fleet numbers: 25, 27, 33 & 34
- Capacity: 3 LT 0 cwt 0 qtr (3.05 t)

Specifications
- Car body construction: Timber
- Car length: 19 feet 6 inches (5.94 m) over body, 22 feet 9 inches (6.93 m) over coupling points
- Width: 8 feet 0 inches (2.44 m)
- Height: Likely 12 feet 6 1/2 inches (3.82 m)
- Wheelbase: 11 feet 2 inches (3.40 m)
- Maximum speed: 50 mph (80 km/h)
- Weight: 7 LT 15 cwt 0 qtr (7.87 t) unloaded
- Axle load: 3 LT 17 cwt 2 qtr (3.94 t) unloaded
- Braking system: Westinghouse air brake
- Coupling system: Screw
- Track gauge: 5 ft 3 in (1,600 mm)

During the normal construction program of D vans four vans were segregated and constructed to a different plan, with four wheels and a shorter body. The vans, numbered 25, 27, 33 and 34, were intended for shorter workings in suburban areas, counteracting additional length in more powerful locomotives to allow trains to still fit in sidings and platforms.

25D was built in 1863 at Williamstown Workshops, followed by 27 D, 33 D and 34 D in 1883-1884 at Newport Workshops. In 1890 the four vans had booking offices installed at the non-cupola end of the vans, so that tickets could be sold on the trains instead of requiring platform staff on lesser-patronised lines, like the remnants of the Outer City Circle or perhaps the Buninyong Line. From around 1895 the vans had a letter "H" marked on the body sides, indicating that they were to be stored for the most part and used in service only in times of peak traffic. The letter was formalised into a code in 1899, when the vans were re-coded DH to avoid confusion with the regular vans. In 1910 they were to be re-coded ZH, following that pattern. 25 D became 25 Z accidentally, but it was scrapped in 1911 so the problem was rendered moot. Around the same time 34 ZH was allocated to the Ballarat breakdown train., until it was withdrawn in November 1956. The van was officially scrapped, but the body remained onsite as late as 1979. Vans 27 ZH and 33 ZH were scrapped in 1919, as electrification spread throughout the Melbourne network and locomotives were no longer taking up valuable platform length.

=== Z Vans ===
In the 1910 recoding, the 'D' vans took on the letter 'Z', setting a pattern for the next seventy years. D vans 1 to 265 were renumbered to 1 to 242, filling gaps opened by scrapped and converted vehicles. Vans 1 to 5 ZDS became 243 to 247 Z.

All vans built to this style from 1911 onwards, were lettered 'Z' and numbered from 248 up.

In 1924, the New South Wales Government Railways took control of the Deniliquin and Moama Railway, and acquired three Z vans previously purchased from the VR. All assets were then handed to the Victorian Railways, per Clause 47 of the Border Railways Act, 1922, Schedule 1. The vans numbered 1 and 2 under the D&MR system became 27 Z and 33 Z, using numbers freed by the ZH series, and the third van was scrapped. As noted above 25 DH became 25 Z, instead of 25 ZH; and there is no reference to a 34 Z, indicating that this would have been the number applied to the third D&MR van.

Construction continued through to 1929, terminating with vans no. 624 Z, 625 Z, and 626 Z entering service on 26 January that year. Vans fitted with automatic couplers after 1933 were marked with a large, painted letter A in opposite corners.

The program picked up again during World War II, as freight trains were running more often and the existing fleet of vans was no longer sufficient. 1941-1945 saw a new group of vans built to the existing planked-body design, but with only two axles rather than three, and steel underframes in place of timber. The increased axle load was not an issue because all lines had long-since been upgraded to handle the additional strain, and locomotives were far more powerful than they had been when the vans were first introduced in 1886. The new vans took numbers 627 Z to 706 Z, with the first 20 entering service in 1941, a further 20 in 1943, and the balance of 40 built continuously through 1944-1945. These vans had their shunter's steps mounted higher, roughly in line with the axleboxes rather than just below them. Additionally, the vans were constructed with only two cupola windows, rather than four, to save on glass costs.

A final batch of vans was constructed in 1950-1951, this time with a steel frame and two axles, but also with sheet-metal panelled body sides in place of planks. These forty vans were numbered 707 Z to 746 Z.

In later years many vans would have panelled or planked sections swapped, depending on the parts available at the time.

Notably, when the Victorian Railways wanted to save money in marking the ends of rarely used sidings, they would place a pair of white timber baulks across the track. With the introduction of the D/Z vans, these baulks had to be notched at the left side when approaching on the track, to make room for the underhanging threaded screw rod from the hand brake at the cupola end of the vans and avoid further damage in case of a derailment.

=== Modifications ===
As buffers were phased out of all trains from the late 1950s to early 1960s, Z vans began to develop riding quality problems caused by the amount of slack in couplings along the length of trains. Guards reported being thrown around and injured by the rough riding. Trains had previously run up to 45 wagons' length, with a standard wagon length being around 12 to 15 feet (3.7 to 4.6 m). With automatic couplers becoming the new standard, train lengths had increased gradually up to 74 wagons plus van, doubling the slack forces that needed to be absorbed.

Additionally, the diesel locomotives being introduced at the time were only fitted with automatic couplers, rather than the dual screw and automatic couplers fitted to most steam engines of the time. To overcome both the slack and coupler incompatibility problems, a number of vans were modified, going through various iterations until solutions could be found.

==== ZP Vans ====
To solve the problem of coupler compatibility, a group of vans were fitted with dual couplers recovered from scrapped steam locomotives. This allowed them to be used as transition vehicles between newer diesel locomotives, fitted with automatic couplers, and older passenger cars fitted with screw couplers. Dates of conversion are not recorded, but vans altered were marked with a letter "P" painted in the upper corners, standing for "plural". This was explicitly different from the "P" marking later applied to freight stock permitted to travel at passenger train speeds of 70 mph (113 km/h); these vans were only allowed to run at 60 mph (97 km/h). The extra speed was made possible by the addition of a false floor consisting of 3 LT 0 cwt 0 qtr (3.05 t) of scrap rails. The lower centre of gravity also improved the ride quality relative to track state, but did nothing to ameliorate slack forces. From 1956 the vans were officially re-coded ZP, rather than just Z with "P" markings. The vans fitted exclusively with automatic couplers were not recoded ZA, because by that time the entire fleet had been made autocoupler-compatible.

Vans converted to ZP were 19, 31, 33, 56, 85, 153, 181, 182, 184, 187, 190, 194, 197, 198, 206, 211, 212, 215, 222, 224, 227, 237, 239, 240, 253, 260, 468 to 471, 494, 498 to 500, 585, 599 to 601, 603, 604, 611 & 619 – a total of 42 vehicles.

==== The ZZ Van ====
In an effort to improve ride quality, the Railways converted 742 Z from a four-wheeled van to a bogie guards van. It featured cast bogies with outside spring dampers, and entered service as 742 ZZ. It was theorised that the extra springs between axles and bogie, as well as between bogie and frame, would help to reduce vertical forces experienced due to less than ideal track geometry, though it is not clear how the fitting of bogies would have helped with coupler slack problems.

The van ran on experimental trains from December 1958. Departmental officers rode other trains as well to gauge the difference in riding qualities across different van types. The test was deemed a failure on cost grounds and the van was placed back into storage at Newport Workshops by the middle of 1959.

==== ZL Vans ====
One of the other concepts put forward was to fit vans with longer-shank couplers in lieu of the standard type, to give greater coupler travel. This allowed more time to absorb the acceleration and braking forces in the train, and effectively prevented the rough riding caused by the slack action.

About 300 vans were modified on a rotating basis; a van shell would be lifted, the underframe removed for modification, and the underframe from the previous van would then be rolled into place, to accelerate the program. Modified vans kept the number of the body (against locomotive practice, where the number stayed with the frame); and were recoded ZL on completion. The first altered van was 719 Z to ZL in 1959, and in January 1960 No.742 re-entered service as a ZL. The program continued through to 1965, eventually absorbing some of the ZP vans as well.

Three vans, numbers 347 and 431 joined later by 420ZL, were exclusively allocated to the Cudgewa line, for stock specials. These vans had been fitted with extra vents and berths for cattle drover accommodation. A further two vans were allocated to standard gauge, and were used on either end of NN wagons on the ballast trains during construction of the new Albury line.

==== Clearance Van ====
In 1961, the remnants of van 218 Z (ex 241 D) were modified such that it could be used to test clearances for special loads going to Gippsland, for the Hazelwood Power Station project.

A pantograph was fitted with a graphing device which recorded the height of the overhead contact wire.

The vehicle was stored at Newport Workshops when not in use. It is thought that the vehicle was not used beyond 1974; it was later sold to Simsmetal and scrapped on 22 December 1979.

==== ZB Vans ====
Like the ZP vans before them, twenty of the ZL fleet were upgraded in 1971 by adding three tons of rail and a false floor. The vans were coded ZB, possibly indicating a planned use on ballast trains where constant stopping and starting could have created derailment risks. The vans were numbered 1 to 20, previously ZL van bodies 552, 348, 528, 427, 574, 452, 378, 308, 472, 317, 434, 405, 224, 393, 226, 463, 288, 481, 232 and 457 respectively. The vans were not considered particularly useful, with the first withdrawn in 1973 and none lasting beyond 1984.

==== ZD Vans ====
By 1978, most of the older screw-coupled passenger stock had been withdrawn, so the ZP vans were losing their usefulness. From that year, some of the class had their ballast removed and the ZP designation replaced with ZD, indicating retention of dual couplings but lowering of maximum speed back to 50 mph (80 km/h), for freight work and possibly as transition vehicles within workshop limits. About a third of the class was re-coded, those members being 19, 31, 211, 237, 239, 260, 468 - 471, 494, 500, 600, 604, 611 and 619, for a total of 16.

== Mail vans ==
The railway records show twenty two fixed wheel mail vans in service. They were given the code E and were numbered 1 - 22, and externally resembled D guard's vans without the cupola at one end. They appear to have been attached to trains and used to transfer mail between centres. Port Melbourne is mentioned, most likely involving mail transfer between Melbourne and ships. The mail vans were placed into service between 1858 and 1885. However, there are anomalies, because the records were re-written in 1886 and most of the previous data lost. From the diagrams available, it appears that some of the class were converted from surplus carriage stock.

The vans were progressively removed from service from 1888. Three were converted to C class Hearse vans (which were later converted into J class Hearse vans). Remaining cars were modified as sleeping vans for use by the then 'Existing Lines Branch'. Until 1910 they were re-coded into the WS group, and W thereafter. Most of the vans (as W) were scrapped in the late 1920s / early 1930s.

Three vans survived to the 1950s:

- E 9 as W 116 - scrapped late 1970s, body at Elmhurst as of 1999. It had moved out to Warrnambool way sometime around 2025.
- E 21 as W 114 - scrapped 1958
- E 22 as W 113 - scrapped 1960, earmarked for the ARHS, no disposition information

=== Mail sorting vans ===
In early 1909, five D vans were modified to include a mail sorting section, for traffic between Melbourne and Bendigo. They were numbered 1 to 5 DMS, previously having been 188 D, 177 D, 180 D, 194 D & 179 D.

In the 1910 recoding the class was altered to ZDS, following the principle where the two bogie guard & mail sorting vans, previously D^{D}MS, became CDS.

In March 1911 the vans were returned to the standard guard van design. They took the number group 243 Z to 247 Z, in that order.

== Workmen sleepers ==
The WS class evolved from a collection of old carriages and vans in railway service. At 1886 there was a list of carriages and their use as works sleepers. These carriages were later absorbed into the "WS" number group. Whilst it is difficult to determine exactly when these class letters were first used, the data suggests 1887.

These works sleepers were used throughout the state system. They were accommodation for supervisory and repair staff who were required to travel. These people included telegraph fitters, foreman, bridge repairers, track staff, signal fitters. Conversions of redundant stock progressed from the 1890s until April 1910. No doubt this stock was released by the introduction of bogie carriages. This caused a cascading effect which left the oldest stock built up to the 1880s for railway use.

By April 1910, the WS fleet numbered 1 to 120. In the 1910 renumbering, the WS class letters became simply W. The vehicles were re-numbered in the process which makes research from the Diagram Books difficult. Construction and conversion into this group continued after April 1910 as the 'W' class and in that number group. Types The WS class includes conversions from: AB First/Second class fixed wheel cars, B / BH Second class fixed wheel cars, E mail vans and D Guards Vans. 1 to 8 WS became 2 to 9 W; 10 to 12 WS became 1 to 3 WW; 13 to 118 WS became 11 to 118 W.

In the most cases, the WS cars that became W were the 2nd or 3rd vehicle of the number.

From 1906, a number of older vehicles were scrapped and were rebuilt to a new sleeping van design built in 1901. This van eventually became 1 W.

== Significant cars ==
- 1 A (2nd) - built in 1889 by Brown & Marshall and was noted as an "Exhibition Car". It survives today as a workman's sleeper, WW 128 on a farm, 160 km north of Melbourne.
- 4 A (2nd) - built in 1893; from 1903 to 1907 was used as the Vision Test car, a predecessor to the medical services provided by the Railways to all staff, to ensure that they were capable of carrying out duties safely.
- 67 A & 68 A - built in 1880 as 4-wheelers; in 1891, each had a single bogie added, becoming known as Ministerial 2 and 1 respectively. In 1899, they were merged onto single underframe as Edinburgh, renamed in 1910 as Mitta Mitta, and in 1924, became the Vision Test Car. Scrapped 1939.
- 69 A - built in 1858 as 4-wheeler, became a Departmental car in 1890. Converted to the Dynagraph car in 1896. Sighted at Newport Workshops in 1939, with a last-oiled date of 1924. Scrapped 1953.
- 147 A - built in 1883 as 6-wheeler. Re-classed to 359 B in 1892, recoded in 1910 to 37 X, converted to 43W in 1946, rebuilt in 1963 as 151WW. Off register by 1986, but was kept as living quarters for the driver of Steam Crane No.45. It had been stabled at Arden Street workshops (North Melbourne/Macaulay) since approximately 1970 on its own track with a canopy, and as a body only from 1997; the occupant left after hip operation and the body was offered to ARHS. 151 W still was on wheels at Arden Street in the 1980s, it then turned up on a property in Plumpton Road Diggers Rest in 1995 still with its wheels, but was removed some time later.
- 153 A - built in 1883 as 6-wheeler; reclassified as 343 B in 1892; converted to Hospital Car No.2 in 1909.
- 199 A - per above, then 283 B (1887), 283 BH (1889), destroyed in Braybrook (Sunshine) crash 20 April 1908.

== Other conversions ==
=== Travelling Booking Office (TBO) ===
As a result of the 1890s economic depression the railways, like all other businesses, were required to cut costs in any way possible. One method of achieving this was to remove staff members from a lot of small stations; to compensate, ticket sales were made on the train. To achieve this, a handful of carriages were fitted with a booking office area, with a small sales window.

The South Gippsland Line had a special carriage provided; first class car 173 A was modified to become 1 TBO in 1892. The car had been acquired from the Hobson's Bay & United Railway Company in the 1870s. The car was converted to full-passenger traffic as second class holiday car 68 BH in 1900. In the 1910 recoding this became 57 YH; 1913 saw the car altered again to a Workmans sleeper 156 W, which was finally scrapped in 1938.

A second car, 2 TBO, was converted from 77 AB in 1900 as a replacement for 1 TBO. 77 AB had been built in 1882. This car ran in service until 1909 when it became 117 WS, then 115 W in the 1910 renumbering. It was marked "off register" in 1911.

=== Weight Machine Adjuster (WMA) ===
These three vans were assigned to weighbridge fitters, who travelled around the state maintaining weighbridges. They were probably outfitted as sleepers.

In 1888, mcarriage 247 B (ex Hobsons Bay) was relettered as 1 WMA. The vehicle was four compartments long, each with a door on either side; the body was 20 ft long. This was scrapped in 1903.

A further two cars were converted to 2 WMA and 3 WMA in 1898, coming from 45 AB and the first 376 B (ex 172 A, Hobsons Bay stock) respectively. 2 WMA was scrapped in 1906 and replaced with a new-build workmans sleeper, 23 WS. That van was recoded to 21 W and lasted in service to the late 1970s. 3 WMA became the second 82 WS in 19078, then in the 1910 recoding it became 80 W. It was scrapped in 1928.

References to a 5 WMA exist, but there are no records indicating that the van was ever built or in service. This is thought to be a case of 'pre-empting' uncompleted work, or else a mis-lettering of the 45 AB/2 WMA diagram.

== 1910 Renumbering and later ==
In the 1910 mass recoding, the cars kept their then-current designations but with A replaced by X, B replaced by Y, and D replaced by Z. There were no passenger C cars in service at this time, and the letter had been recycled in 1893 for hearse vehicles. H, where appropriate, was retained.

Cars that had been built between 1850 and 1880 were largely scrapped by 1930. Later-built stock was recycled for other uses, being used up to the 1980s and ending their days as workmen sleepers.

The final number range was from 1 A to 274 A (excluding 129), although not all numbers were in use at the same time and the majority were recycled at least once. In fact, 117 numbers were used twice, and of those 13 were used three times. After 1886 a total of 276 cars were classed A at some point or another. Before the 1910 recoding there were B/BH cars in the range 1 to 479; after the recoding, with renumberings to fill the gaps, the range shrunk to 1 to 385.

== Demise ==
The mail vans were the first to go, being phased out by the 1930s.

The fixed-wheel passenger stock hung around a little longer, but was mostly gone by World War II. By 1976 the fleet was mostly used for vintage excursion purposes, with a handful noted as in service.

After about a century of service to the Victorian Railways, guard's vans began to get phased out around the mid-1980s. By the end of the decade they were gone, replaced by 'electronic guards' - red lights that flash - on the end of the train. In 1976, the Victorian Railways' rolling stock register recorded a mere seven Z vans, along with 19 of the 20 ZB vans, 10 ZD and 5 ZP vans out of 42, and 342 ZL vans recorded as serviceable on the broad gauge system, plus two on standard gauge.

=== Preservation ===
Compared to the huge number of cars that were constructed, only a handful have survived with preservation railways, including some of the plethora of privately owned bodies around country Victoria, used as barns and the like. Not including the Z Vans, which there would be easily 100 or more in private ownership there are a few workman sleepers and other types including WK, Y, YZ, & ZH still in existence.

The Newport Railway Museum has 220 ZL as well as 136 AB, which was without an underframe until in September 2023 when a new underframe was built. Another van 174 Z is stored waiting allocation, and is currently held in East Block at the Newport Workshops. 12 XY may also be in storage as well.

At Bright railway station, a display of rollingstock, representative of the trains which would have visited the station in its heyday, includes 488 ZL.

Similarly, a display at Coal Creek, Korumburra, includes 334 ZL along with Victorian Railways Short W type carriage passenger cars, steam locomotive K 169, a pair of QR open wagons and the frame from Oil Tank 45.

The Daylesford Spa Country Railway has 544 ZL, used on the end of works trains and more recently passenger trains as a crew carriage. 468 ZD is kept at Trentham, as part of a collection of rolling stock that may one day be amalgamated with the existing fleet.

The Mornington Railway Preservation Society has custody of 364 ZL, used as stationary vehicle for Ticket Office at Moorooduc Station, 457 ZL as having been restored back from 20ZB to 457ZL, and 604 ZD. 582 & 586 ZL have likely been disposed of by the railway. The railway also have possession of workman's sleepers W 152, W 257, & W 278.

Steamrail Victoria has custody of 470 ZD, & 600 ZD (which was a support van for steam locomotive Y 112 when West Coast Railway was operating.) There is also the body of 222 Y which is stored in West Block as a body on the frame of 144 HD formerly, horsebox F 32. The ZD vans were previously used as a link between auto-coupled and screw-coupled rollingstock. Nowadays they are mainly used for shunting, and special trains on open days. Steamrail may also be the custodians of 471 ZD, and 590 Z.

The Seymour Railway Heritage Centre formerly owned 2 ZL, 395 ZL, and ZD 611. 2 ZL has moved to the Mansfield Historical Society.

The Victorian Goldfields Railway has ZL 333 in operational condition as Z 333, 518 at Maldon & 563 ZL stored at Castlemaine. The VGR acquired 395 ZL, and 611 ZD around 2015 from SRHC, along with 40 X, 309 Y, & 69 YZ. There is also 47 XZ stored on the underframe of ZL 395, with the body located outside, as well as 382YH on 1WZ's underframe.

The Yarra Valley Railway has 619 ZD, and has acquired both 19 ZD from Steamrail Ballarat and 58 Z & 594 ZL's underframe from Huon.

=== The Veteran Train ===
Carriage set 40 X, 309 Y, 69 YZ was first restored to operating condition in the early 1950s as a display piece for the 1954 Victorian Railways Centenary. Since that time the cars have been kept in fairly good condition.

=== Current deployment ===
- Carriage set 40 X, 309 Y, 69 YZ at Castlemaine, recently transferred from Seymour. Coupled with Z vans either end, fitted with auto couplers. The body of 19 YZ is located at Castlemaine.
- 12 XY and 136 XY at ARHS, Newport

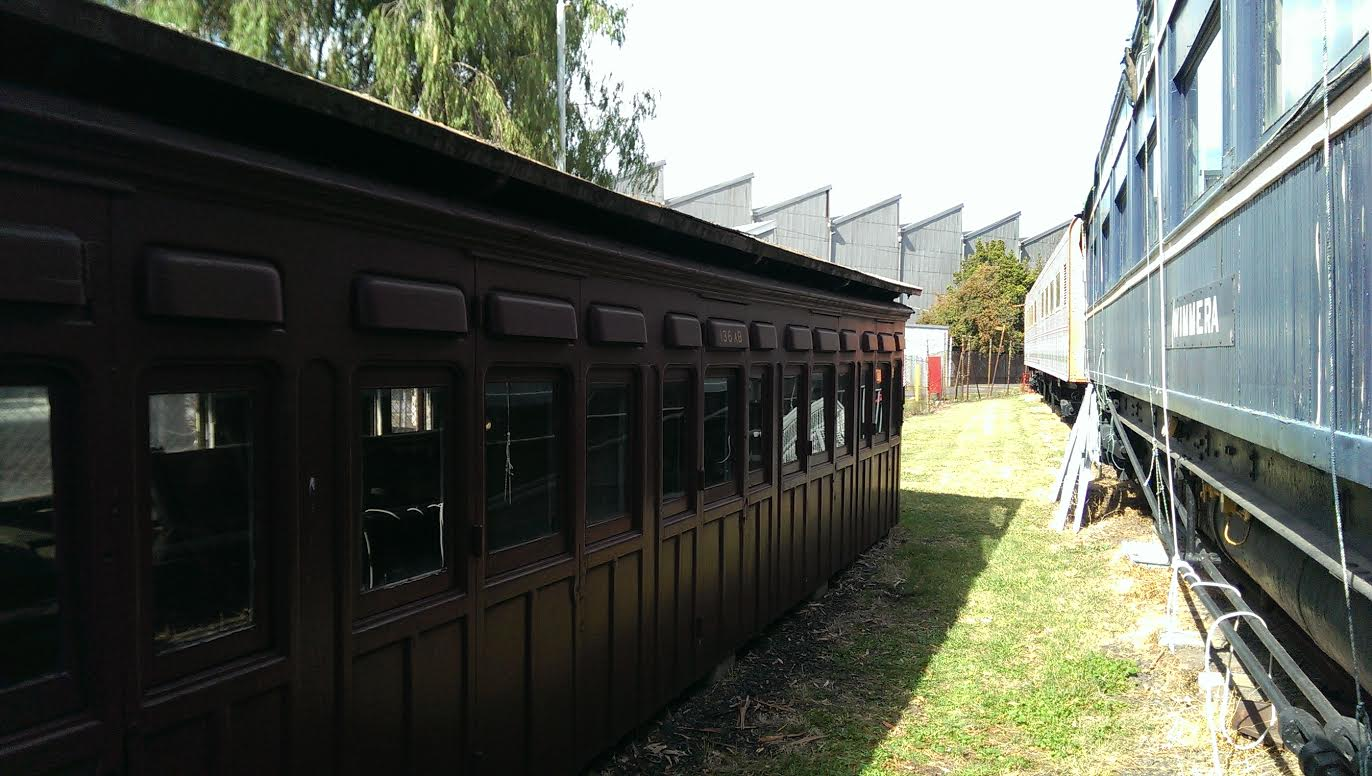
Photograph of the body of Victorian Railways carriage 136AB at ARHS Museum, Newport.

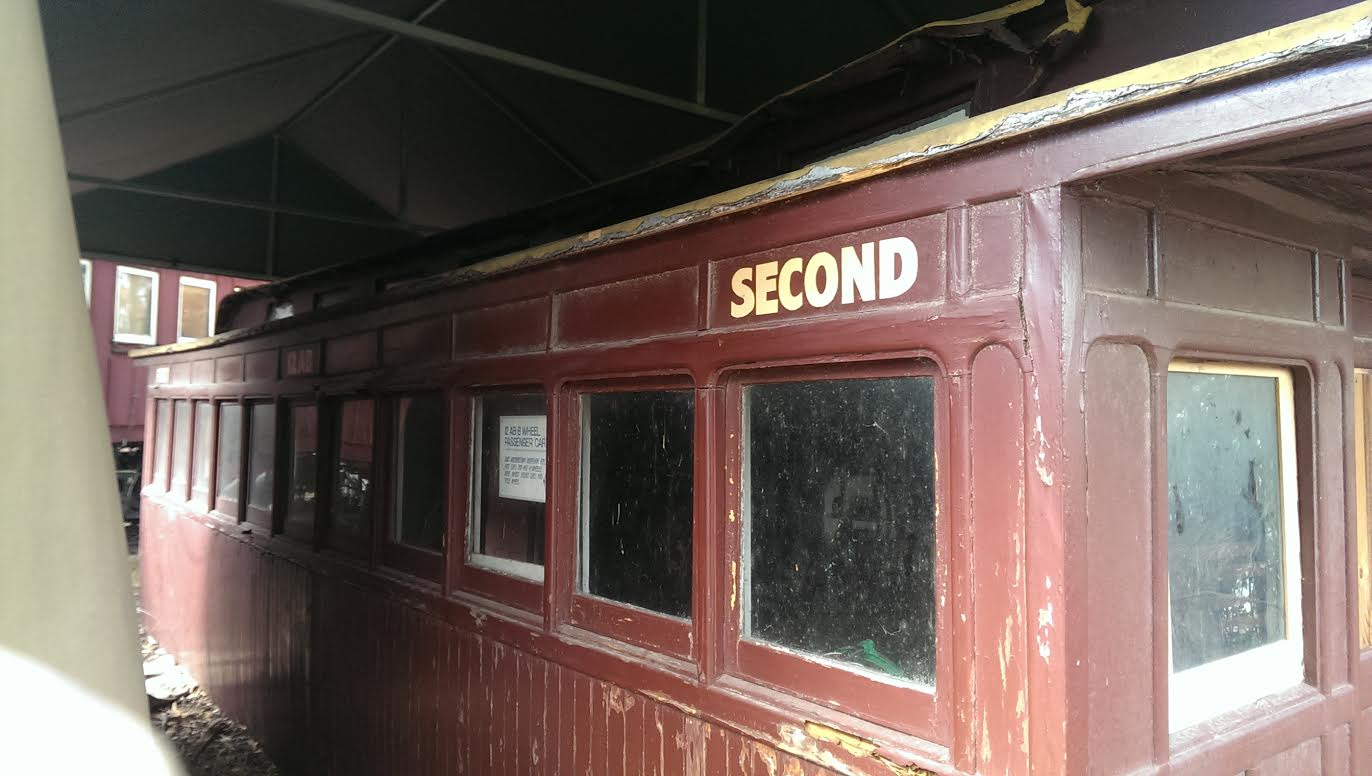
Photograph of the body of Victorian Railways carriage 12AB at ARHS Museum, Newport.

- 47 XZ (body only) at Seymour
- 222 Y (body only) at Steamrail; 382 YH may be at Seymour
- 143 A (Brown & Marshall, 1883) exists as 110 WW (on 3' 6" bogies) at the Bellarine Railway, Queenscliff

Photos of the last move the Seymour set was involved in; 40X-309Y-69YZ

- Additionally, 19 YZ was stored at Maldon minus its underframe, but has been sold to a private individual.

Pack	Van	Colour	From	To	Cupola windows	Inner cupola ends	Chimney	Door type	Axle Boxes	Notes	Photos
Z001	004Z	Wagon Brown	c1910 (Ex D)	1973 (Off Register)	All visible	Yes	Yes, Black	Solid, unbarred	Regular	Incorrectly marked as ZP 1956-1957	Pre-1910?
Z001	315Z	Wagon Brown	1912 (Built)	1979 (Off Register)	All visible	Yes	Yes, Black	Solid, unbarred	Regular	Ballarat Breakdown van, later Loco Van, 1936 to 1979	27/04/1975, 02/10/1976, 14/10/1979
Z002	477Z	Wagon Brown	1914 (pending windows?)	1975 (Off Register)	All visible	Yes	Yes, Black	Solid, unbarred	Regular	c1935, Maryborough Breakdown Van. Scrapped 1975.	
Z002	330ZL		1965 (ex Z)	1983 (Off Register)	Centre pairs covered	Yes	Yes, Black	Solid, unbarred	Regular	Permanently allocated to Seymour Breakdown Train	
Z003	418ZL		1961 (Ex Z)	1981 (Off Register)	Centre pairs covered	Yes	Yes, Brown	Solid, unbarred	Regular		19xx, 1979, 07/01/1978, 24/04/1978, 13/10/1978
Z003	488ZL	Wagon Brown	1963 (pending windows? Ex Z)	1981 (Off Register)	Centre pairs covered	Yes	Yes, Brown	Solid, unbarred	Regular	Ex 488Z 1963; mesh over windows 1980; Off Register 1981; Preserved Bright	1978
Z004	579ZL		1961 (Ex Z)	1980 (Off Register)	Centre pairs covered	Yes	Yes, Black	Solid, unbarred	Regular		
Z004	153ZP	Passenger Red	1956 (ex Z)	1974 (Off Register)	All visible	Yes	Yes, Brown	Solid, unbarred	Regular		
Z005	239ZP	Passenger Red	1956 (ex Z)	1974 (marked Overhead Only)	All visible	Yes	Yes, Brown	Solid, unbarred	Regular	Ex 239Z 1956. In 1974, marked with "OVERHEAD ONLY"; 1977 recoded 239ZD, 1978 off register	c1975, 17/10/1976
Z005	471ZP	Passenger Red	1956 (Ex Z); 1957 (Painted red)	1977 (Recoded to ZD)	All visible	Yes	Yes, Brown	Solid, unbarred	Regular	1976 - on last train to Maldon. Preserved Steamrail 1983.	1960s, 06/03/1977, 06/05/1977, 25/03/1979
