= Jolimont Yard =

Former railway yard in Melbourne, Australia

Coordinates: 37.817°S 144.975°E

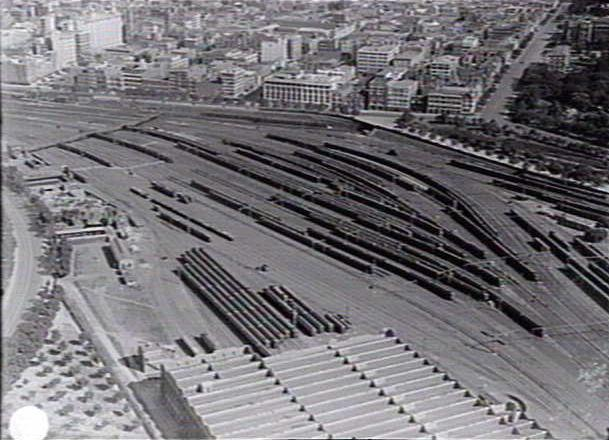
Overhead view of the workshops and yard looking north west, in 1929.

Jolimont Yard was an array of railway lines and carriage sidings on the edge of the central business district of Melbourne, Australia. Located between Flinders Street station, Richmond Junction, the Yarra River and Flinders Street they were often criticised for cutting off the city from the river, being the site of many redevelopment proposals. The Princes Gate Towers (Gas and Fuel Buildings) were built over part of the yard in the 1960s, which themselves were replaced by Federation Square in the 2000s. The rail sidings themselves were progressively removed from the 1980s to the 1990s with only running lines today, but the area continues to be referred to as the 'Jolimont railyards' by Melburnians.

== History ==
The area of the Jolimont Yards had long been a site of railway development. Flinders Street station was the terminal of the first railway in the city, running to Sandridge (now Port Melbourne). It was later joined by the independent Princes Bridge station on the eastern side of Swanston Street, which served as the terminal for lines towards Richmond, South Yarra and Hawthorn. The two stations were not connected together until 1866, with Princes Bridge not reopening until 1879.

As time continued, the area between Princes Bridge and Richmond stations developed into a major yard for the stabling of suburban carriage stock, as well as the servicing of the steam locomotives that hauled them. Freight traffic was based out of Melbourne Yard and most of the country carriage stock was serviced at the Dudley Street sidings, both adjacent to Spencer Street station. The running lines were arranged into pairs (inbound and outbound for each destination) with multiple sidings located between them.

In 1917 the Princes Bridge locomotive depot was closed, and replaced by the Jolimont Workshops. Built as part of the electrification of the Melbourne suburban network, it was the main storage, servicing and maintenance depot for the new fleet of suburban trains. The workshops was erected to the south along Batman Avenue, with the storage sidings located between the running lines. A footbridge ran from Flinders Street across the entire yard to provide access for train drivers.

An electrical substation was also erected to the south of the yard, to feed power into the overhead wires. Of 18,000 kilowatt capacity, it was fitted with four 4500 kilowatt rotary converters and was the largest substation on the network until demolished in the early 1970s to make room for the City Loop portals for the Caulfield Group. Additional sidings were also provided in the triangle formed by the lines bound for Richmond and Jolimont. Located on the site of the East Melbourne Cricket Ground, the ground was acquired by the Victorian Railways and the Essendon Football Club played their final season there in 1921.

The next major change was construction of the Richmond Flyover beginning in early 1970s. Part of the quadruplication works between Richmond and Burnley stations, it converts the up (inbound) – down (outbound) – up – down track layout at Flinders Street to an up – up – down – down track layout at Richmond and beyond. Completed in February 1973, it also permits a cross-platform interchange between City Loop and Flinders Street direct trains at Richmond on platforms 7/8 and 9/10. The flyover necessitated the reconstruction of a footbridge that linked Yarra Park to the Melbourne Cricket Ground.

Further changes occurred when the City Loop was built. In addition to the relocation of the electrical substation, numerous tracks at Richmond Junction needed to be relocated to make room for the ramps descending into the tunnel, and tracks in the yard itself were slewed as work progressed on the cut and cover tunnels. The Metrol train control complex was also constructed beside the yards on Batman Avenue, to control the loop as well as to replace the five Flinders Street signal boxes. During construction the public discovered that the building would block the view from Russell Street to the Botanic Gardens and Government House, and that it had occurred due to no planning permit being applied for. State Premier Rupert Hamer responded to public outrage and instructed the half built building to be demolished, and instructed all government departments that they must apply for planning permits, whether they were legally needed or not. The building was redesigned to be lower, resulting in completion being delayed until early 1980.

== Past elements ==
=== Workshops ===
The Jolimont Workshops were the main maintenance and repair facility for the Victorian Railways electric fleet, both multiple units and locomotives. Located on the south side of the yard, it was made up of a large brick carshed with tracks leading into if from both the east (Richmond) and west (Flinders Street) ends. In addition to the maintenance of the suburban multiple unit fleet, the E class suburban freight and L class mainline electric locomotives were maintained there until the 1960s.

=== Signal boxes ===
Five signal boxes controlled traffic into Flinders Street station. Later replaced by Metrol, four of them were located in Jolimont Yard:

Flinders Street B was located at the Richmond end of Flinders Street platform 8/9 and controlled the southern tracks into and out of the station from Jolimont Yard. Constructed of brick it was of 'traditional' Victorian Railways design, and was demolished when the Federation Square Deck was built.

Flinders Street C was located beyond the Richmond end of Flinders Street platform 4/5 and controlled the northern tracks into and out of the station from the yard. Constructed of brick it was of 'traditional' Victorian Railways design, and was demolished when the Federation Square Deck was built.

Flinders Street D was located at the Richmond end of the Princes Bridge station island platform (later renumber to Flinders Street 15/16). Of utilitarian brick construction it remains in place today just outside the Federation Square Deck, but is unused as a signal box.

Flinders Street E was located at Richmond Junction, and controlled the junction as well as access into the Richmond end of the stabling sidings. Of utilitarian brick construction it remains in place today underneath the William Barak Bridge, but is unused as a signal box.

=== Footbridges ===
During the heyday of the yard only two footbridges crossed the yard:

- The Botanical Gardens Footbridge, located west of Richmond station it links Yarra Park with the Melbourne Cricket Ground. The central span was rebuilt with increased clearances when the Glen Waverley flyover was constructed underneath it in the 1970s, but the original lattice truss approach spans remain.
- A second footbridge ran from Flinders Street, between Russell and Exhibition streets, and ran south over the tracks. It was for railway use only, with stairs running down to the stabling sidings below. The access gate for the bridge remains evident in the Flinders Street fence today.

Only the first bridge remains today, all other current bridges being recent additions.

== Redevelopment plans ==
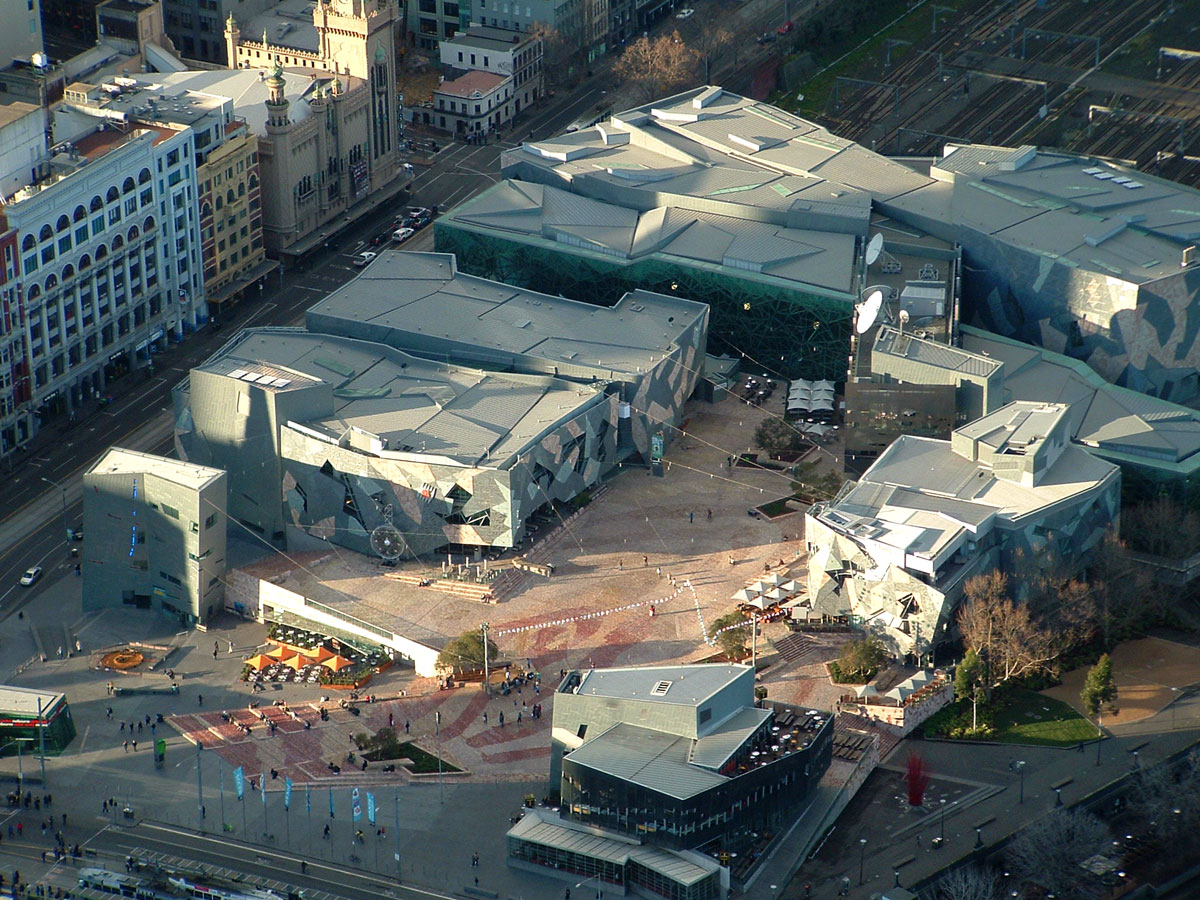
Federation Square atop the railway lines

Over the years, various redevelopment plans for Jolimont Yard have been proposed by various parties, including:

1925: Cathedral Square In 1925 a design competition was held by the Royal Victorian Institute of Architects for redevelopment of the rail yard. The winner was James Smith with his proposal set back from the street line, featuring a paved civic plaza and fountain, railway offices, tourist bureau and a concourse to Princes Bridge station.

1929: Metropolitan Town Planning Commission The Metropolitan Town Planning Commission was created in 1922 and was chaired by City of Melbourne councillor and architect Frank Stapley. The initial report included a city square over the yard between Flinders Street and Batman Avenue, running east 33 feet (10 m) from Princes Bridge, but was later dropped as unsuitable due to cost and traffic congestion.

1954: MMBW Melbourne Metropolitan Planning Scheme The Melbourne & Metropolitan Board of Works commenced its Melbourne Metropolitan Planning Scheme in 1949. This scheme involved redeveloping the Yarra River frontage, partially roofing the rail yards, constructing a bridge from Russell Street to Batman Avenue, and building underpasses below Princes Bridge and Batman Avenue.

1958: Kenneth McDonald This plan was proposed by Kenneth MacDonald and Associates to the City of Melbourne, and proposed the roofing of the rail yards between Swanston and Spring streets, with public space, shops, car parking, apartment and hotel towers, a theatre and an office tower built above.

1961: Matthew Flinders Square This proposal was put promoted by ex Lord Mayor William Lempriere and was prepared by architects Montgomery, King and Trengrove. It aimed to fix the "desecration of the city's southern gateway by the rail yards," and the "'mid-Victorian monstrosity" of Flinders Street Station by roofing the rail yards and relocating the railway station underground. The open space on either side of Princes Bridge would be the home of a new Town Hall, a 6-acre (24,000 m^{2}) civic square, concert auditoriums, the railways administration, and other commercial buildings.

1963: Princes Gate Announced in 1963 by Premier Henry Bolte, the £5 million project would roof part of the yard and build a plaza and two 15-storey buildings on this structure. Completed in 1967 and commonly known as the Gas and Fuel building, the Princes Gate Towers were demolished in 1996–1997.

1973: Jolimont Pleasure Gardens A City of Melbourne proposal for roofing the yards and reconnect the city with the river and sports and arts precincts beyond.

1979: Landmark Competition Premier Rupert Hamer announced a $100,000 competition for designs to roof the remainder of Jolimont Yard. Over 2300 entries were submitted, with 48 finalists selected by a committee chaired by Ron Walker. No overall winner was chosen, a composite scheme with a tower in a garden setting recommended instead. Each of the finalists receiving a little over $2,000 prize money, with designs including hanging gardens, an underwater gallery, a free-standing escalator, a series of 12 transparent arches, a solar-powered earth beam, a Freedom Bird Park, and a Time Tower.

1985: Denton Corker Marshall By the architecture firm, the Princes Plaza Proposal included demolition of one of the Princes Gate towers, and the construction of a large street level plaza stretching across the yards, and a new building to the east surrounding a formal garden.

1996: Federation Square A design completion for the site commenced in 1996, resulting in Federation Square that was opened in October 2002.

== Rationalisation ==
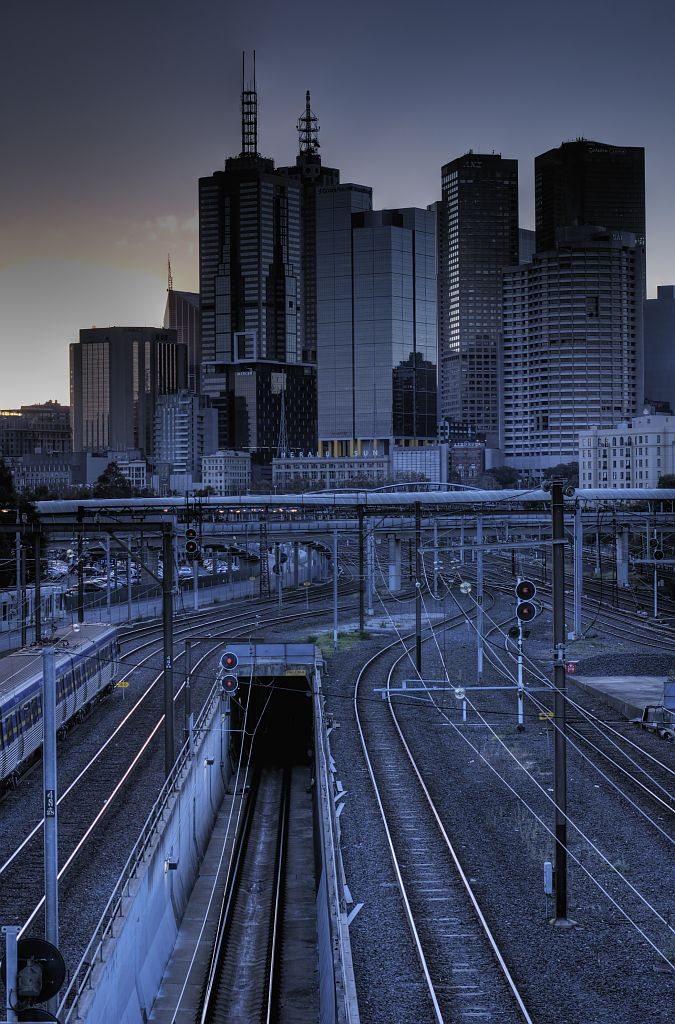
Looking towards the city from Richmond today

The first area of the yard to be removed was the 'Collingwood Sidings' in the northern corner, near the intersection of Wellington Parade South and Jolimont Road. The area was cleared of tracks during 1987 and 1988 and was offered for sale as a development site. Purchased by a company that later collapsed, it was not until the mid-1990s that the present apartment buildings were built. High-rise apartments that featured in the final stage, that ran into opposition in the early 2000s, but were approved in 2005.

The State Government announced the Federation Square project in 1996, along with additional development of the sports and entertainment precinct and new parklands. Rationalisation of the yard was carried out in 1997–1998 to clear the way, with the stabling sidings and workshops removed and replaced by new facilities located elsewhere, including:

- Epping station received a new major workshop and stabling yard, opened in 1990.
- Macaulay received a light maintenance facility located on the site of existing stabling sidings in 1993.
- Melbourne Yard was the site of a replacement washing plant and stabling sidings made operational in May 1995.
- Westall and Bayswater stations both received new train maintenance facilities and stabling yards at a cost of $16.5m. The yards were constructed on little used goods sidings and house seven or three trains respectively.
- Camberwell station received new stabling sidings on the site of the former goods yard.
- Burnley station received new stabling sidings on nearby unused land.

The track rationalisation itself cost $40 million with 53 operating lines between Flinders Street and Richmond were reduced to just 12. The number of points was also reduced, from 164 to 48 and 1 in 9 and 1 in 15 points were used to permit higher speeds. New lower profile masts were installed to support the overhead wiring, and a new electrical substation erected to supply power to the trains. The main area of new track was between Flinders Street Station, Richmond Junction and the City Loop portals.

Piling works and crash walls for Federation Square were done by October 1998. The deck was completed by mid-1999, with building works atop of it commencing in August 1999. The removal of other buildings along Batman Avenue was carried out at this time, including the Metrol train control facility. Opened at the time of the City Loop opening in 1981, it was moved to a temporary location pending the replacement of the elderly technology with a new system.

The Exhibition Street Extension was also built, connecting the CBD to Batman Avenue and Swan Street, permitting the closure of Batman Avenue for Federation Square and Birrarung Marr. Tolled as part of the CityLink project, it was opened in 1998 and carries trams and four lanes of traffic. In June 1999 tram route 70 was rerouted from Swan Street to a new section of reserved track running between the Tennis Centre and the remaining railway lines, entering the CBD via the Exhibition Street Extension rather than Batman Avenue. A new footbridge from the Multi Purpose Stadium to the MCG Great Southern Stand concourse was built, and the existing footbridge from the MCG Pontsford Stand to Scotch Oval was rebuilt and widened.

As part of the 2006 Commonwealth Games the 525-metre long William Barak footbridge was built east–west from Birrarung Marr to Yarra Park. Construction started in 2005 and it was opened in 2006.

== Today ==
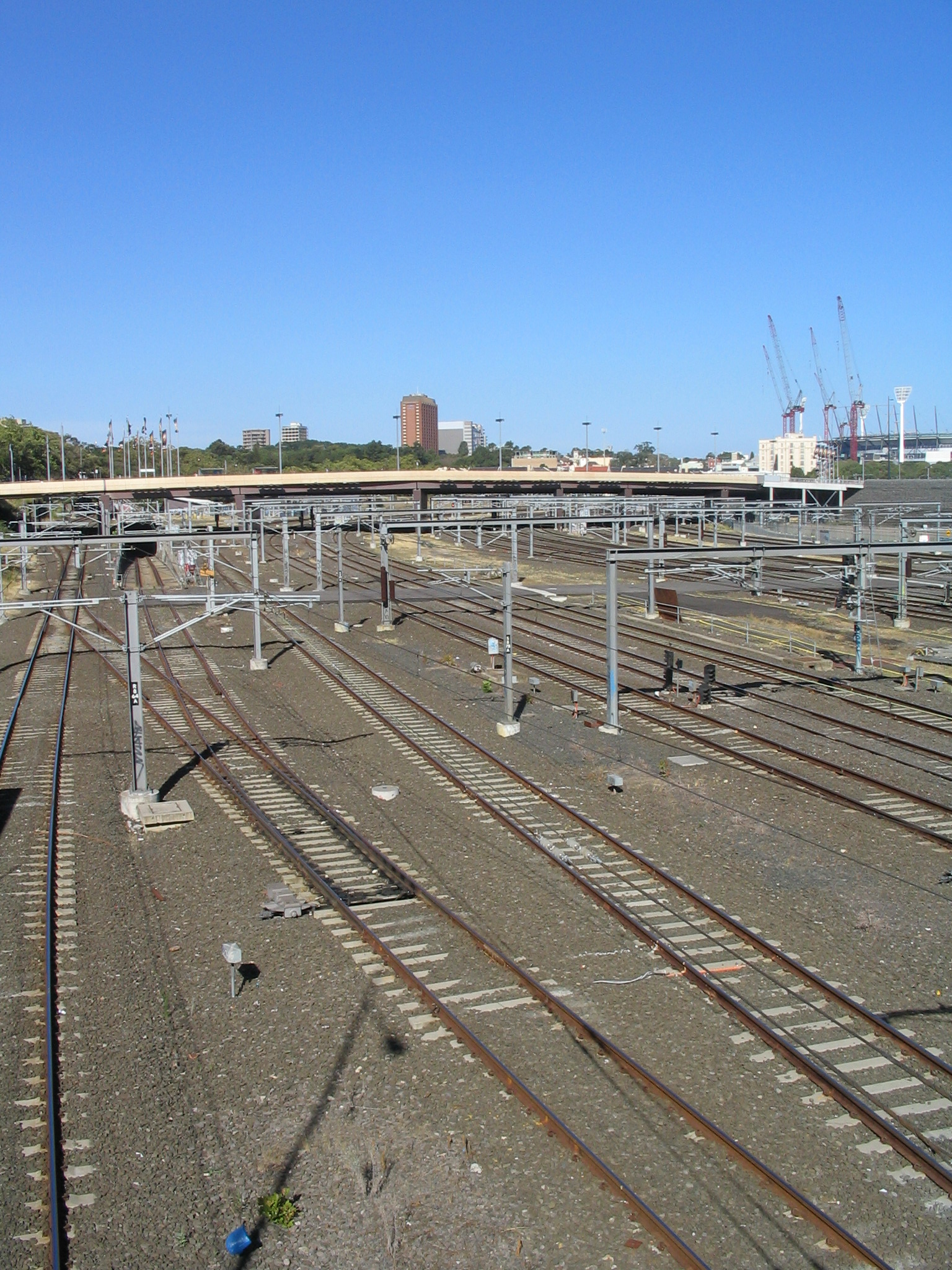
View east over the remaining lines from Federation Square

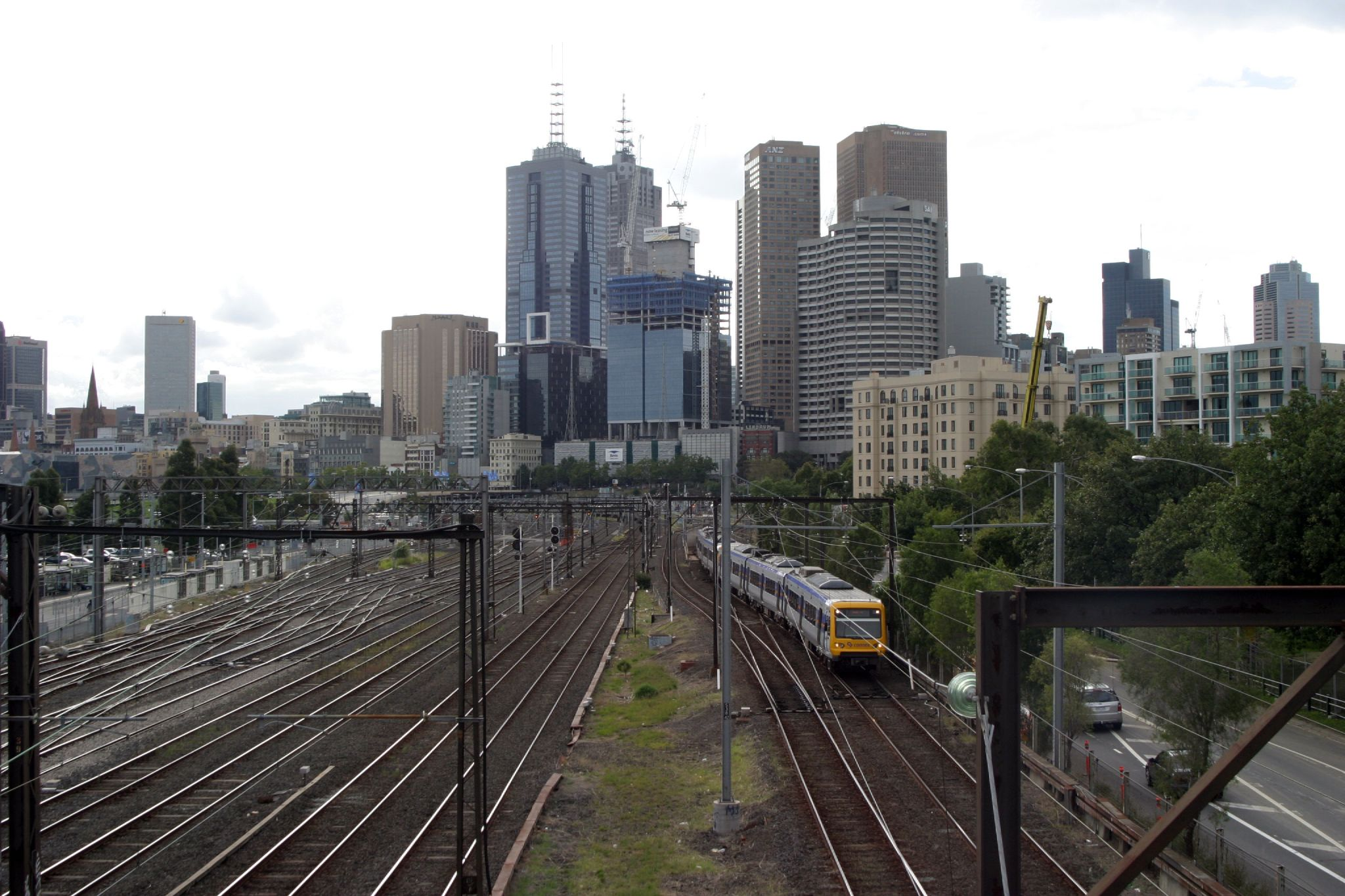
Looking west over the former yard from the MCG footbridge

Twelve tracks run through the area today, in six pairs named (from north to south):

- Burnley through lines
- Burnley local lines
- Caulfield local lines
- Caulfield through lines
- Special lines
- Sandringham lines

Where the lines interconnect outside the MCG was originally known as Jolimont Junction, but was renamed Richmond Junction following the demise of the yard.

From Flinders Street in the west to Richmond station in the east, bridges over the area include:

- Flinders Street Station concourse
- Swanston Street
- Federation Square
- former yard footbridge (removed on the rationalisation)
- Exhibition Street extension
- William Barak footbridge
- Melbourne Park – MCG footbridge
- Multi-Purpose Arena – MCG footbridge
- Yarra Park footbridge
- Richmond station sports subway

On 28 April 2008 Premier John Brumby announced that his government was proposing a multimillion-dollar development to link the sports and arts precincts in Melbourne's CBD. To be funded by a public-private partnership, the railway lines would be roofed and commercial buildings built on top. The next day the Victorian Employers' Chamber of Commerce and Industry urged the roofing over the railway lines east of Federation Square for the construction of a residence for the Prime Minister of Australia, as well as for hosting visiting heads of state and business delegations.

In August 2009 the VECCI again brought up the topic of roofing over the railway tracks, an article in The Age cited a 2002 cost of $1.4 billion.
