= Metrol =

Control centre of the Melbourne suburban rail network

Metrol is the central control centre of the Melbourne suburban rail network. It controls signalling, passenger information, and emergency procedures. It is located at 595 Collins Street, Melbourne.

== Operations ==
The Metrol building as completed in the 1980s

Metrol has two key functions—train control and signalling. Operations are split, with train control covering the whole suburban area, while control of points and signalling is only over a limited area in the centre of Melbourne. Outside this area, signal-boxes direct trains under the direction of the train controllers at Metrol.

Before Metrol, the points and signals in the Melbourne suburban area were controlled by a series of individual signal-boxes, under the direction of a train controller who coordinated train movements. The original function was to be the main train control facility for the Melbourne suburban railways, as well as to be the signal box for the City Loop, and to control the ventilation and other systems for the tunnels. It was later expanded in function to control points and signals for other stations in the inner Melbourne area.

The current area of point and signal control extends to Clifton Hill, Jolimont, East Richmond, Flinders Street, Southern Cross, North Melbourne Junction and South Kensington. The outer section of the Hurstbridge line will also be controlled from Metrol after the completion of resignalling works, with work beginning in 2006. Metrol is also where information about cancellations or delayed trains is entered into Metro Trains' SMS disruption alert system.

== History ==
The original Metrol building on Batman Avenue as proposed in the 1970s.

Proposed Metrol building on Batman Avenue

The Metrol train control complex was built as part of the City Loop project of the 1970s. The original site was on Batman Avenue, beside the Jolimont Yard, and adjacent to Electrol, the control centre for the railway electrical substations and traction power supply. During construction, it was revealed that the Metrol building would block the view from Russell Street to the Botanic Gardens and Government House, and that no planning permit had been applied for. Bill Gibbs, chairman of VicRail, stated that under Section 79 of the Railways Act 1958, VicRail had the right to build anything on its own land that it deemed necessary. The City of Melbourne and the Board of Works asserted that a permit was necessary, because the building was within 60 metres of the Yarra River. State Premier Rupert Hamer responded to the public outcry by ordering the half-constructed building to be demolished. He also told all government departments that they must apply for planning permits, whether they were legally obliged to or not.

The building was redesigned with a lower profile, which meant that completion was delayed until early 1980. That, in turn, delayed of the opening of the City Loop past August 1980. Control of suburban trains by Metrol commenced on 13 September 1980.

As part of the removal of Jolimont Yard, the Metrol building was demolished in 1999, and Metrol operations were moved to Transport House (589 Collins Street, Melbourne). The functions of Electrol were relocated to a permanent location elsewhere. The Transport House location was only intended to be temporary, pending the replacement of the elderly technology with a new system; however, as of July 2017 Metrol was still at the same location (now named 595 Collins Street).

When M>Train was franchised to operate half of the Melbourne suburban network, after the privatisation of the system, the company was required, under its contractual obligations, to complete a new Metrol system that was originally contracted by the PTC that was previously required to be complete by 1999 to allow the relocation before privatisation. Due to mismanagement by Adranz and the PTC the contract was extended to June 2001 and therefore was required to be completed by M>Train. Work on the Train Management Facility started when Bombardier Transportation was awarded an $11 million contract, with completion originally due in 1999 but extended until mid-2001. The project included plans for a back-up "disaster recovery centre" at Melbourne Central station. In 2003 the State Government and M.Train agreed to cancel the $18 million contract owing to the undeliverability of the original PTC specification; however publicly, saying it was unhappy with the deal.

On 28 June 2005, a leak in an air-conditioning hose caused Metrol to be shut down for two hours from 11.40am, causing 30,000 passengers to be stranded and 66 trains cancelled, with 23 more trains cancelled later in the day due to flow-on effects. Train operator Connex Melbourne was fined $300,000 by the State Government for failing performance benchmarks.

A second attempt to provide a replacement train control centre was announced in May 2006, as part of the State Government's "Meeting Our Transport Challenges" policy, and was costed at $88 million. The first stage was a $27 million contract, awarded to Westinghouse Rail Systems in March 2007, for the design and installation of the new Train Control and Monitoring System. A customised version of the SystematICS control system was to be provided, with completion expected in November 2010. At a later date, separate contracts were to be offered for a new passenger information system, a new reporting system, and a refurbishment of the central control facility.
