= North Melbourne Locomotive Depot =

Former Australian train workshop

Coordinates: 37°48′32″S 144°56′20″E

- Interactive map of North Melbourne Locomotive Depot

Location
- Location: West Melbourne

Characteristics
- Operator: Victorian Railways

History
- Opened: 1880s
- Closed: 1964

North Melbourne Locomotive Depot was the main location for maintenance of the Victorian Railways steam locomotive fleet based in Melbourne. Located in the middle of the Melbourne Yard precinct in the suburb West Melbourne near North Melbourne station, the site is now occupied by the Melbourne Steel Terminal. The depot was described by railway employees as "the hub of the universe", "the VR's nearest approach to Dante's Inferno", or "the Black Hole of Calcutta" depending on their disposition.

== History ==
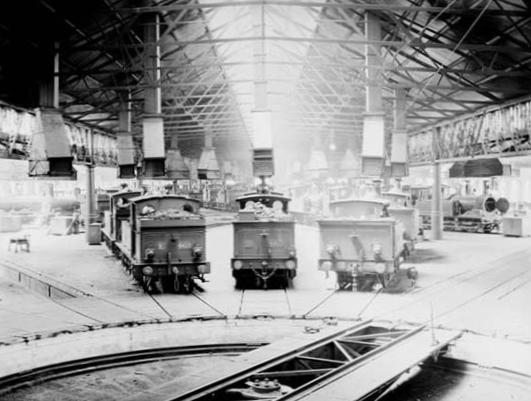
Steam locomotives E 462, R 483, and M 224 around one of the turntables circa 1905.

The depot was opened sometime in the 1880s by the Victorian Railways, replacing its first locomotive depot located in the Spencer Street station yard. It was located beside the Railway Canal, a section of Moonee Ponds Creek that enabled the direct unloading of coal transported by sea from New South Wales. The rectangular building was built of brick and iron with three turntables located inside. There were six track entrances, two at the front from the main goods yard, three from the stabling roads, and one at the rear. A three road coal stage was located to the south of the depot, along with a number of open air stabling roads.

As late as the 1950s the depot housed 160 locomotives, but with dieselisation from 1952 the end was near. The new South Dynon Locomotive Depot was opened across the creek for the new locomotives as part of the North East standard gauge project, with the last steam-hauled train leaving Melbourne on 18 May 1964 - R703 on the 18:05 to Geelong. The depot was ceremoniously demolished on 20 January 1965 when steam locomotive K188 pulled down the front wall of the depot with a steel rope in front of a crowd of onlookers.

== Post-demolition ==
From the time it was demolished, within a year part of the space had been reused to provide new space to refill the ice hatches of insulated refrigerated wagons. (Note: Refer position of signal post number 85, and the track marked "T") By 1967 the rest of the site had been filled with twelve stub sidings for long-term wagon storage. The sidings were still present (though slightly reconfigured) in 1983,, but by 1996 the area had been cleared again and re-used for a series of transfer sidings collectively known as the Melbourne Steel Terminal. Broad gauge trains from Long Island would terminate roughly on the former site of the locomotive depot, and a large gantry crane was used to transfer steel products and loads between those and a standard gauge train parked on an adjacent track over the former South Yard sidings.
