= WCR =

WCR can refer to:

- WCR FM, a community radio station in Wolverhampton, England
- Waterloo Central Railway, a heritage railway in Ontario, Canada
- Western Catholic Reporter, a former weekly newspaper of the Roman Catholic Archdiocese of Edmonton, Alberta, Canada
- West Central Railway zone, India
- West Clare Railway, a former railway in Ireland, now a heritage railway
- WestCoast Racing, a Swedish auto racing team
- West Coast Railway (Victoria), a railway operator in Australia
- West Coast Railways, a charter train operator in Lancashire, England
- West Cross Route, in London
- World Championship Rugby, a 2004 rugby union video game
- World Classic Rockers, a rock band featuring former members of Steppenwolf
- World Climate Report
- World Congress of Rusyns
- WorldWCR, FIM Women's Circuit Racing World Championship (motorcycles)

== See also ==
- West Coast Railway (disambiguation)
