= Victorian Railways bogie guard's vans =

Australian railway rolling stock

Bogie guard's vans
- Manufacturer: Victorian Railways
- Built at: Newport Workshops, others
- Operators: various heritage operators, previously VR and V/Line

Specifications
- Doors: 69
- Track gauge: 5 ft 3 in (1,600 mm)

As the Victorian Railways' fleet of Z vans began to age, the railways decided to invest in bogie designs for vans. Some van designs were included in a class of new passenger vehicles. Many other vans, for both freight and passenger work, were built separately from any other rolling stock developments, and these are the ones that feature here in detail.

== C vans ==
D^{D}, later C vans
- In service: 1888-1984
- Manufacturer: Victorian Railways
- Built at: Newport Workshops
- Constructed: 1888-1893
- Number built: 48
- Number preserved: 18, 27, 28, 35, 40 & 48
- Number scrapped: 42
- Design code: D^{D}, D^{D}MS & O, later C & CDS
- Fleet numbers: 1-48
- Capacity: 8 LT 0 cwt 0 qtr (8.13 t) or 12 passengers
- Operator: various heritage operators

Specifications
- Car body construction: Timber panels
- Car length: 40 ft 0 in (12.19 m) over body; 43 ft 2 1/2 in (13.17 m) over pulling lines
- Width: 8 ft 6 in (2.59 m)
- Height: 12 ft 8 5/8 in (3.88 m)
- Maximum speed: 60 mph (97 km/h)
- Weight: 18 LT 18 cwt 0 qtr (19.20 t) unloaded
- Axle load: 4 LT 14 cwt 2 qtr (4.80 t) unloaded
- Bogies: TT30 at 27 ft 10 in (8.48 m) centres
- Braking system: Westinghouse air brakes
- Coupling system: Autocoupler
- Track gauge: 5 ft 3 in (1,600 mm)

The first development in passenger guard's vans, the D^{D} class, totalling 44, was built between 1888 and 1893. They were 40 feet (12.19 m) long, and sat on two bogies. They featured a centred cupola, made possible due to the lack of passenger compartments; and the design was effectively two Z vans back-to-back, with a single cupola and fitted with bogies. Around 1890 some of the vans were fitted with end vestibules, and in 1893 the class was fitted with toilets for the guard.

In the 1910 recoding the D^{D} vans became the C vans. Not much information is available on the vans between 1910 and 1950, so it is assumed that they were generally unaltered. Around this time the class absorbed some of the older Intercolonial Express vans, which had been built to a South Australian Railways design but given to the Victorian Railways when that fleet was replaced with newer vehicles of the E type carriage group. These vans became 45C and 46C, were slightly shorter and had the guard compartment fitted at one end instead of centrally.

In 1908 vans 17 and 24 were modified for mail sorting use, and recoded D^{D}MS. Circulars (internal rail notices) from the era noted that the two vans were used on the Bendigo service, one van on the 0645 Bendigo and the 1515 Melbourne trains, and the other van for the 1215 Bendigo and the 1850 Melbourne services. In the 1910 recoding the vans became the CDS class, still retaining numbers 1 and 2. In 1922 it was decided that the vans were no longer needed in mail traffic, so they were converted back to what was by then the C vans. They became C47 and C48 respectively, because the 1910 recoding had used their old numbers - the class had been renumbered to fill the gaps.

However, the renumbering had allowed for van C43 to be numbered as such. This van was similar to others in the class but it has a very different history. More information can be found here.

In 1942 van 16C was permanently allocated to the wartime military ambulance train, at one end of a string of eleven BPL cars that were topped at the other end by dining car Campaspe and Sleeping Car No.5.

By the mid-1950s the vehicles were worn out and in need of replacement, after up to 70 years of hard service. Instead of creating a whole new class, under frames and bodies were repaired or replaced as required, retaining the same numbers. When this happened the vestibule connections on applicable vans were eliminated and boarded over.

Some of these vans also possessed a 'ducket', which was a small box with windows on the side of the van, to allow the guard to look down the side of the train. 'Duckets' were not always applied to both sides or both ends of the train - their application seems rather random.

Due to a lack of inter-carriage diaphragms and the ancient construction giving draughty conditions for staff, the vans were banned from service as of midnight 7 June 1982.

=== Preserved units ===
In 2013, six C vans were recorded as being preserved, though none were operational.

- 15C is located at a school in Arthur's Creek.
- 18C was preserved by the Victorian Goldfields Railway at Maldon, awaiting restoration.
- 25C was preserved on private property at Wheatsheaf, Victoria.
- 27C was preserved at Newport Workshops, stored on "rotten road".
- 28C was preserved by the Daylesford Spa Country Railway, "pending restoration".
- What is thought to be are 23C & 32C are located at a property in Exford, Victoria.
- C34 & C44 are preserved at the Millewa Pioneer Park.
- 35C was preserved (where?)
- 37C is located on a farm near Carlsruhe.
- 40C was preserved by the South Gippsland Railway, and restoration had been planned for the 2015-2016. The railway closed in 2016, and scrapping of the van commenced June 2021
- 48C was preserved by Steamrail Victoria, under the care of DERMPAV, in no.9 road at West Block, Newport Workshops.

== CA, VVAP vans ==
C/CA, later VVAP vans
- Manufacturer: Victorian Railways
- Built at: Newport Workshops
- Constructed: 1960-1961
- Entered service: 1960-1984
- Number built: 15
- Number preserved: 3, 4 & 12
- Number scrapped: 12
- Design code: C, CA, VVAP
- Capacity: 10 LT 0 cwt 0 qtr (10.16 t)
- Operator: various heritage operators

Specifications
- Car body construction: Steel panels
- Car length: 40 ft 0 in (12.19 m) over body; 43 ft 0 3/4 in (13.13 m) over pulling lines
- Width: 8 ft 6 in (2.59 m)
- Height: 13 ft 3 1/2 in (4.05 m)
- Maximum speed: 60 mph (97 km/h)
- Weight: 23 LT 0 cwt 0 qtr (23.37 t) unloaded
- Axle load: 5 LT 15 cwt 0 qtr (5.84 t) unloaded
- Bogies: TT30 at 28 ft 0 in (8.53 m) centres
- Braking system: Westinghouse air brakes
- Coupling system: Autocoupler
- Track gauge: 5 ft 3 in (1,600 mm)

In 1960, because of the experiences encountered during rebuilding of the C vans, a new set of 15 C vans was built, numbered one to fifteen. These vans were intended for freight service. The remaining old C vans in that number range were renumbered to make room, but stayed as C vans.

The new C vans differed in that they were fitted with periscopes rather than cupolas, and that they were constructed from steel instead of wood.

By 1961 the class had been re-lettered to CA.

In the 1979 renumbering, the class was altered to become the VVAP's. However they did not last long, as the class was not re-lettered until 1983-1986 and by this time guard's vans were being eliminated on freight trains.

=== Preserved units ===
Four of the CA vans have been preserved, though none are currently operational.

- 2CA is on private property near Larras Lee, NSW.
- 3CA was retained by the State Government until 1993, as VVAP3. It was then sold into preservation.
- 4CA has been preserved and is currently operating as an AIRBNB under the name "The Oakview Carriage" situated on Oakview Wildlife Refuge in Queensland
- 12CA was preserved by the Victorian Goldfields Railway at Maldon, awaiting restoration. In 2009, it was shifted to Donald, and is now displayed with an assortment of other vehicles including Taggerty and J524.

== CE vans ==
The class started as the DVE's of 1906, numbers 1 to 16. In 1910 they became the CE's, and construction continued up to 32CE in 1923. In 1924 CE 33-37 were built with elliptical roofs instead of clerestory.

== CO vans ==
Two guard's/luggage vans were constructed for The Overland in 1970.

== CP, VVCP vans ==
CP & JCP, later VVCP & PCP vans
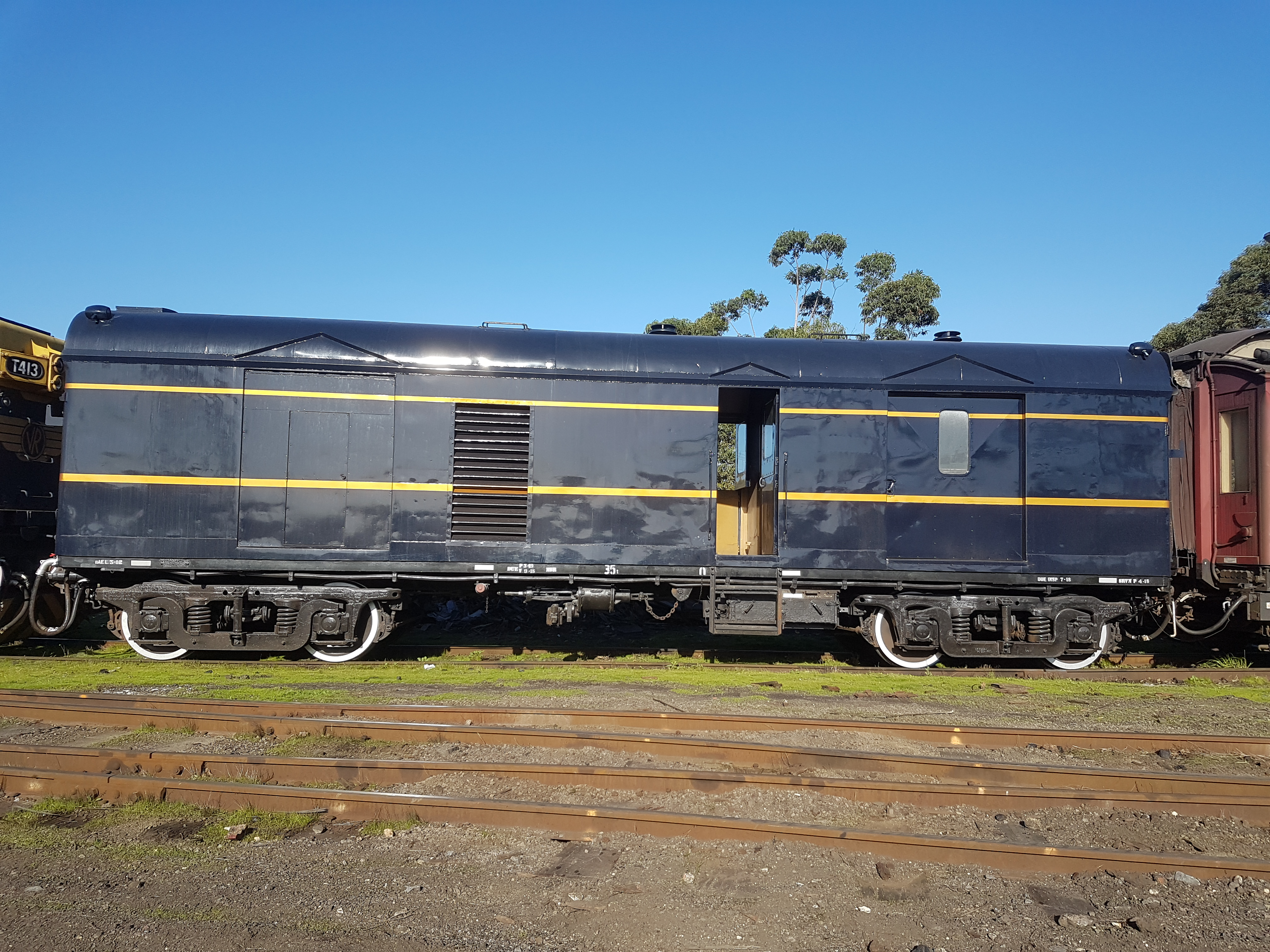
- 292 PCP as preserved by Steamrail Victoria, 2018
- Manufacturer: Victorian Railways
- Built at: Newport Workshops
- Constructed: 1956-1957
- Entered service: 1956-1998
- Number built: 40
- Number in service: 29
- Number preserved: 4, 24, 28, 30, 33, 35, 37; 291, 292, 293 & 294
- Design code: CP, JCP, VVCP, PCP
- Capacity: 10 LT 0 cwt 0 qtr (10.16 t)
- Operator: various heritage operators

Specifications
- Car body construction: Steel panels
- Car length: 39 ft 0 in (11.89 m) over body; 41 ft 11 1/2 in (12.79 m) over pulling lines
- Width: 9 ft 3 in (2.82 m)
- Height: 12 ft 10 1/8 in (3.91 m)
- Maximum speed: 70 mph (113 km/h)
- Weight: 37 LT 0 cwt 0 qtr (37.59 t) unloaded
- Axle load: 9 LT 5 cwt 0 qtr (9.40 t) unloaded
- Bogies: BX at 27 ft 0 in (8.23 m) centres
- Braking system: Westinghouse air brakes
- Coupling system: Autocoupler
- Track gauge: 5 ft 3 in (1,600 mm)

From 1956 to 1958, 40 guard's vans of the CP design were constructed by A.E. Goodwin (NSW), and painted in a Passenger Red livery. They were intended to run on passenger trains and some fast goods trains, and had a freight capacity of 10 tons. The vans were of all-steel construction and welded to an underframe, which rested on two 4-wheeled bogies fitted with roller bearings.

Aesthetically the vans were very similar to the earlier S8300 series vans of the South Australian Railways, and the later WBA and WBC vans of the Western Australian Government Railways. The new vehicles had many amenities, including a stainless steel wash basin, toilet, mirror and stove. The walls and ceilings were lined with wool and the interior lining was of painted plywood, while the floor was insulated with a rubber layer. All windows were of armour-plate safety glass. Earlier vans had three windows per sliding door, while later vans had one per sliding door. All vans were fitted with axle-mounted generators for electric lighting.

To allow the removal of ZJF vans from service between Melbourne and Adelaide, nine of the 40 vans were recoded to JCP in the late 1960s, the 'J' representing "Joint Stock". They were not needed from the mid-1980s and so were then re-lettered back to CP, with their old numbers.

Over time, some members of the class were repainted into Wagon Red, signifying their move from passenger to freight service.

Between 1983 and 1986, the entire class was recoded to VVCP. However, in 1987 vans VVCP 34, 16 and 25 were modified at Ballarat North Workshops and repainted in the V/Line orange, white and green livery. They re-entered service as CP vans 291, 292 and 293, and were later joined by CP294 ex VVCP6. The changes included making them compatible with BRUTE trolleys, removal of the stove, toilet, dog box, luggage shelves and drover's seat.

The vans were intended to replace the CD vans which had been leased in the early 1980s due to problems with the CE vans, and retained for use on semi-fixed E type and K type carriage sets. The first three had corridor connections added at both ends, although CP294 only had the connection installed at one end. These connections recycled components from scrapped Harris cars, with cushioned diaphragms matching N sets. The vans had a luggage capacity of 10 tonnes, and were rated for operation at up to 115 km/h (71 mph). All vans had their periscopes removed. All four were painted in a matching scheme, except that CP294's grey roof extended down to just above the doors.

CP291 entered service on 23 July 1987, CP292 in August and CP293 in September the same year.

For a brief period in 1992 the CO vans were not available for use on The Overland due to maintenance requirements, so V/Line substituted the CP vans on an as-required basis (e.g. CP294 on 3 August 1992).

=== West Coast Railway CP, PCP ===
All four vans were later transferred to West Coast Railway in 1993, and repainted from the V/Line orange scheme into the blue with white and yellow of West Coast Railways in mid-1994. Like the steam locomotive tenders and the diesel locomotives, the vans' white stripe from the east end terminated in the middle with a "W" logo, and a tail-end white stripe was added at the west end. Notably, the livery on 294 was the reverse of the other three, with the extended diagonal white stripe from the "W" logo running across the central door on both sides.

In 1995, CP293 was damaged and rendered unserviceable in a derailment at Werribee. It was stored at Ballarat East workshops and used as a source of spare parts. In August 2004, when West Coast Railway was closed, the van was purchased by the Rotary Club of Casterton, placed near the former railway station, with its West Coast Railway colours were restored. By 2008, the van had moved to the nearby river flats, and shortly after that it progressed to a local scrap merchant.

At the end of 1996, vans CP292 and CP294 were converted to include head-end-power generators in the west end, and recoded to PCP. The maximum goods load was reduced from ten tonnes to six, and the conversion included repainting of the existing scheme including the tail-end stripe.

In 1998, the two PCP vans were repainted, which is probably when the centre W logo was replaced with the W over the generator end of the van, with no continuing white stripe at that end. At that time, the north and south side guard windows were removed, along with PCP292's west end diaphragm. However, PCP294 had a buffing plate added above where the diaphragm connection would have been installed at the west end, if that had ever taken place.

Further details on CP, PCP van alterations here:

In 2000, van CP291 was sold to Steamrail Victoria. It was last used in that year when the Millennium Aurora special train visited Melbourne from Sydney. It was spotted stabled in the westernmost storage siding of Newport Workshops' West Block on 12 November 2016. The van appeared to have had a single coat of Victorian Railways royal blue applied over the top of the West Coast Railways scheme, but fifteen years of weathering has worn that down with the outline of the West Coast Railway decals showing through; and in other places the light blue and even the V/Line orange have been exposed. Underframe markings indicate that the van was last examined for serviceability sometime in 2000. Prior to the 2026 Newport Workshops open days, it was repainted into a colour similar to wagon red and reclassed back to 34CP.

=== Preservation ===
With the demise of West Coast Railway in 2004, PCP292 became the property of Steamrail, which repainted the van blue and gold, with Steamrail Victoria lettering. PCP 294 was acquired by 707 Operations and repainted in the Vintage Rail Travel red and silver livery, with 707 Operation logos. Both vans were used as observation vans on railfan tours. Other vans still extant include 4, 28 and 31 at Seymour although they were sold in 2025; 33 at the Newport Railway Museum, and 37 and 39 stored at Newport workshops.

As of 2025 CP 13 & 15 are privately owned in Keilor East.

Espee Railroad Services, a company run by the Australian Railway Historical Society ACT Division, owned vans 24, 30 and 35, and used them on the standard gauge in conjunction with their K-type carriages.

In 2016, the logistics and rail transport firm TransVolution was authorised to operate trains on the V/Line network in Victoria. The fleet list included PCP300. It was not clear if the van was an existing one which had been renumbered, or if it was a new build.

== CV vans ==
In 1898, vans 1 and 2 of the DV class were built, and these were unique in featuring duckets and a clean roofline rather than a raised guard's section at each end. In 1906 the class was expanded to 7, and in the 1910 recoding the class became 1CV to 7CV.

== CW vans ==
CW 1-15 were built in 1913-14 with clerestory roofs. In 1935 vans 16-20 were built with elliptical roofs.

== MHN vans ==
When the standard gauge was completed from Sydney to Melbourne, three Joint Stock guards vans were provided for the Southern Aurora service. The vans were numbered MHN 2364 to 2366, paid for by both Victoria and New South Wales, and were built by Commonwealth Engineering in NSW. Between 1981 and 1984 MHN2366 was temporarily renumbered to 2866. In 1991 it was re-lettered to AHO. By this time all three vans were running in primarily NSW service.

== ZF, ZJF, ZJP, ZLP, VVBP vans ==
ZLP & ZJP, previously ZF & ZJF, later VVBP vans
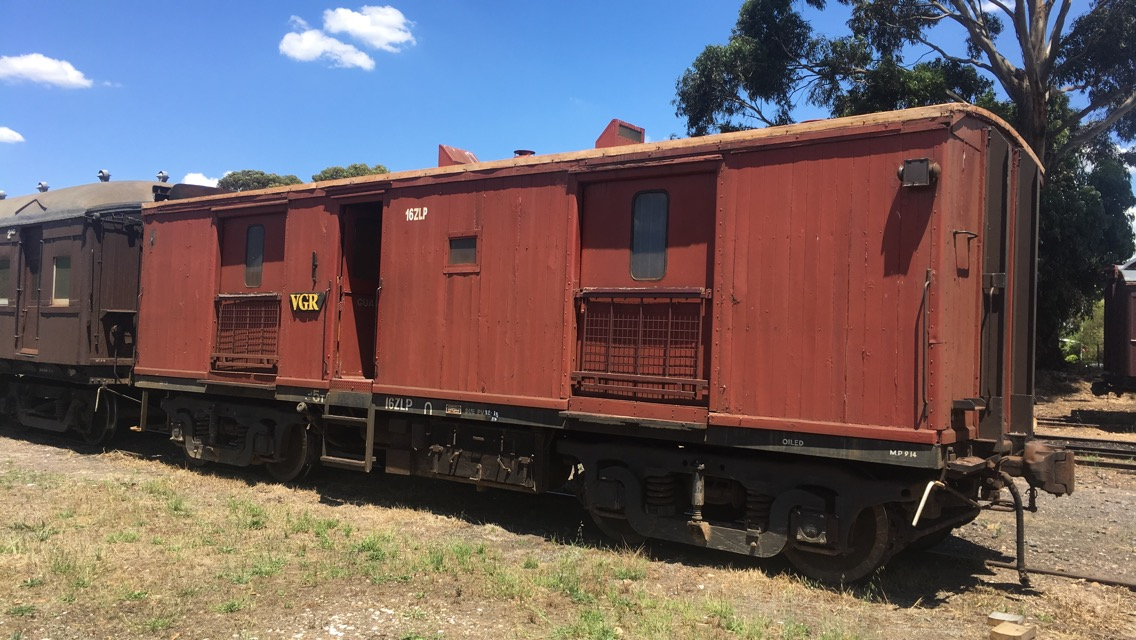
- 16 ZLP at Maldon Station
- Manufacturer: Victorian Railways
- Built at: Newport Workshops
- Constructed: 1956-1957
- Entered service: 1956-1988
- Number built: 80
- Number preserved: 16, 25 & 68
- Number scrapped: 73
- Design code: ZF, ZJF, ZLP, ZJP, VVBP
- Capacity: 8 LT 0 cwt 0 qtr (8.13 t)
- Operator: various heritage operators

Specifications
- Car body construction: Steel panels
- Car length: 34 ft 0 in (10.36 m) over body; 37 ft 4 in (11.38 m) over pulling lines
- Width: 8 ft 6 in (2.59 m)
- Height: 13 ft 5 1/2 in (4.10 m)
- Maximum speed: 70 mph (113 km/h)
- Weight: 21 LT 0 cwt 0 qtr (21.34 t) unloaded
- Axle load: 5 LT 5 cwt 0 qtr (5.33 t) unloaded
- Bogies: BX at 22 ft 0 in (6.71 m) centres
- Braking system: Westinghouse air brakes
- Coupling system: Autocoupler
- Track gauge: 5 ft 3 in (1,600 mm)

As trains became faster in the early 1960s it was realised that new freight vans were necessary, in order to prevent the restrictions imposed by fixed-wheel vans on the end of a long bogie train. To this end, ZF1 to ZF45 were constructed.

In 1962 it was agreed by the Victorian Railways and the South Australian Railways to allow through-running of freight trains, and so seven members of the ZJF class were constructed. They had the same design as the ZF vans.

In 1963/64 the vans were given upgraded bogies and re-lettered to ZJP, indicating their suitability for passenger trains. In 1965 the vans were merged with the ZLP class of vans, and ZJP's 1 to 7 became ZLP 74, 80, 79, 77, 78, 75 and 76 respectively. They were replaced in Joint Stock service by the JCP freight vans.

Between 1963 and 1967 the vans received passenger-quality bogies and were reclassed to ZLP, but the original numbers were retained. They were now capable of 70 mph working. Around the same time, another batch was constructed new. This consisted of ZLP's 46-73, none of which were ever lettered as ZF's.

The vans were used in both passenger and freight work within Victoria. By this point they had been joined by the ex-joint stock ZJF vans, to hold the number group of 1-80.

In 1968 ZLP32 was fitted with a generator to supply electricity to the Showmobile Train, which was an assortment of V-series passenger cars gutted and fitted with billboards.

When four-letter coding was introduced, the ZLP's became the VVBP's. It was at about this time that van scrappings had commenced, and so not all of the ZLP's made the coding jump. In 1987 three VVBP vans were recoded to MD and allocated to maintenance trains. These vans had the guard-related functions removed, including lights, generator, stove, brake pipe tap and half the shunters' steps. These were replaced by crew benches and an external ratchet handbrake at the No.2 end.

=== Preservation ===
Seven vans have been preserved.

- 16 ZLP is allocated to the VGR, stored awaiting repairs.
- VVBP 18 is on a property in Wallington with two MMTB W2 Class Trams.
- VVBP 23 is on private property near Woori Yallock.
- VVBP 25 was withdrawn from service in 1987, reclassified 25ZLP in 1988, and entered into the Historic Vehicles Register. It is apart of the Newport Railway Museum collection.
- 68 ZLP is owned by the YVR.
- 72 VVBP is on private property in Carisbrook.
- 77 VVBP is on private property south of Benalla.

== ZF, VVDY, VZDY, ZVDY vans ==
ZF later VVDY, VZDY & ZVDY vans
- Manufacturer: Victorian Railways
- Built at: Newport Workshops
- Constructed: 1971-1973
- Entered service: 1971-Current
- Number built: 50
- Number preserved: 24 & 40
- Number scrapped: 48
- Design code: ZF, VVDY, VZDY & ZVDY
- Capacity: 10 LT 0 cwt 0 qtr (10.16 t)
- Operator: various heritage operators

Specifications
- Car body construction: Steel panels
- Car length: 38 ft 0 in (11.58 m) over body; 41 ft 4 in (12.60 m) over pulling lines
- Width: 9 ft 9 in (2.97 m)
- Height: 14 ft 0 in (4.27 m)
- Maximum speed: 70 mph (113 km/h)
- Weight: 22 LT 5 cwt 0 qtr (22.61 t) unloaded
- Axle load: 5 LT 11 cwt 1 qtr (5.65 t) unloaded
- Bogies: BX at 26 ft 0 in (7.92 m) centres
- Braking system: Westinghouse air brakes
- Coupling system: Autocoupler
- Track gauge: 5 ft 3 in (1,600 mm)

As the Z fixed wheel vans were long overdue for retirement by the early 1970s, the railways decided to build a batch of ZF vans, numbered 1-50. These are not to be confused with the 1960s ZF vans, which had since been recoded ZLP.

The vans were intended for freight use only, hence the "F" but no "P" in the code.

Throughout the 1970s the vans underwent various changes. Early in the decade they gained vents in the guard's compartment at floor level, and later some vans were modified to include crew compartments for travelling between depots. These wagons are recognisable by the extra, small sliding door at the crew end.

=== V/Line VZDYs ===
In the 1983 van recoding, they were recoded to VVDY. At this time the Teacup livery was coming into use, and so an odd situation occurred: ZF 17 was one of the only items of rolling stock to be photographed with the "old" code, but the new logo.

As vans were eliminated from trains most of the ZF/VVDY class were scrapped or sold. Some of the remainder were used for cyclic track maintenance trains and recoded VZDY, these being vans 9, 11, 14, 24, 27, 33, 40 and 46 which retained their numbers. VZDY 40 was sold to the Bellarine Peninsula Railway and now runs on the 3'6" gauge.

=== Metropolitan Transit / The Met VZDYs ===
The MET also ran a VZDY class, numbers 51 - 54. These four vans were renumbered from VVDY's 28, 22, 7 and 13 respectively. VZDY51 and 52 were sighted, stabled in North Melbourne painted in Metrail green on 22 April 1987, and at least the first three were painted in the MET green with yellow stripe livery. VZDY52 and VZDY53 [sic] (Note: Most likely VZDY53 and VZDY54) were both listed as out-shopped in early November 1987, to make two trains each of VZDY-5xVHMY-VZDY.

The vans were coupled either end of regular consists used in reballasting operations on the Metropolitan network - two vans with the green-painted ballast wagons VHMY 1001-1010, and the other two with open wagons of the VOWA/VZWA 2000-series which had cut-down sides and "METROPOLITAN TRANSIT" logos attached, used for sleeper delivery and spoil collection.

=== South Gippsland Railway ===
24ZF was preserved at the South Gippsland Railway, and across 1995-1996 it was painted in the Victorian Railways' scheme of blue and gold to tie in the airconditioned E type carriages the railway was using. By 2008 it had been restored to a traditional brown scheme. In 2017 it was reallocated to the Yarra Valley Railway.

=== Great Northern Rail Services - GVDY ===
Great Northern Rail Services acquired VZDY52 and refurbished it at Bendigo Workshops. It was released on 25 July 2002 in a deep red livery with a single yellow stripe, and recoded GVDY52-Y. It ran to Melbourne that day, and after arrival a "GNR" logo in a diamond was applied to the sides.

When Great Northern Rail Services wrapped up operations less than a year later the van, along with other assets, was passed to West Coast Railway.

=== West Coast Railway VZDY ===
West Coast Railway purchased VZDY27 and painted it in their colours of light blue with white across the windows, a grey roof, and a yellow stripe at floor level. It was seen at North Geelong in 1996 then Ballarat East in 1997 and 1998. Its use is not clear.

GVDY52 was acquired from Great Northern in late 2002 or early 2003, with a quick repaint to all-over blue with white trapezoids at the ends instead of getting the full treatment. The van was back in service by 17 May 2003, returning to its prior use on Xtrapolis transfer trains. Notably, the van was not recoded to VZDY, retaining its Great Northern code.

=== Chicago Freight Car Leasing Australia ===
At the end of West Coast Railway's operations both vans were sold. The fate of VZDY27 is not clear, though GVDY52 was sold to CFCLA. The new operator didn't bother with a recode or repaint, so the van continued to operate in the simple variant of the West Coast livery for the better part of a decade. This van, and preserved carriage BS212, were the last two vehicles to operate in the West Coast Railway colour scheme. GVDY52 was used as a generator set to release brakes on X'Trapolis 100 trains during transfers to and from Ballarat North Workshops.

=== El Zorro ===
El Zorro acquired vans 9, 52 and 53 at various stages, along with an ex-Commonwealth Railways power van, which they chose to recode ZVDY50, despite the conflict.

- 9 was temporarily recoded from VZDY to ZVDY with chalk. By 2009 it had been shifted to the Seymour Rail Heritage Centre.
- 50 was acquired as VGA96 in January 2004, and recoded as ZVDY50. This van has no relation to the ZF fleet, but the similar code and overlapping number render it worth mentioning. The van is currently stabled at Seymour Rail Heritage Centre in a derelict condition.
- 52 was purchased from CFCLA around 2005, and recoded to ZVDY. It remained in the WCR-derived blue scheme throughout this period.
- 53 was restored by 2011, and recoded ZVDY.

52 and 53 were both fitted with generator sets, to power Xtrapolis train brakes when used on empty transfer runs between Melbourne and Ballarat.

VZDY51 was stabled with van 53 for a period, but it is not clear whether it was owned by El Zorro at any stage.

=== Southern Shorthaul Railroad ===
When El Zorro ceased operating, 52 was on-sold to Southern Shorthaul Railroad and was re-classed BVDY52. It was recoded by August 2017, with a repaint occurring during 2017-18. ZVDY53 has been stabled for some time in the Steamrail compound at Dimboola, though its ownership is unclear.

Southern Shorthaul Railroad also acquired van 51, recoded as BVDY, with check letter A, as seen at South Dynon in 2017. The van appears to have first been used for the transfer of the first High-Capacity Metro Train in late 2018, and can be distinguished from BVDY52J by the former having "SSR" marked on the side and the latter "BRW".

== ZMF, VVEY vans ==
In 1980 an entirely new design of guard's vans entered service. ZMF1 entered service in December, and when it did it caused mixed reactions.

The "van" was actually a short bogie flat wagon, fitted centrally with a plastic cabin and verandah over the handbrakes. The other end held the gas and electrical fittings.

This design was used because of the plans, then shrouded in mystery, to eliminate guards from freight trains. When this eventuated it would be possible to remove the guard fittings and use the flat wagon in freight consists for containers.

Peter J. Vincent's site says, [quote]From the design, most operational staff could readily conjure up images of guards seated in the verandah section with sizzling barbecue, amply supported by a full icebox of 'tinnies' and waving cheerily to passers by.[/quote]

ZMF's 2 to 10 entered service in 1982, only to be recoded to VVEY in 1983. The vans were among the first casualties of the program to scrap guard's vans, but only two under frames were reused. These became the QD wagons no.3 and 4, and were used for transporting cranes that did not have railway wheels. The QD's were also later used on sleeper trains, with the sleepers hydraulically transported from the QD to the appropriate machinery.

=== Preservation ===
Two VVEY Vans are preserved at the Railway Museum in Williamstown, Victoria. They are mainly used as storage.

== Passenger cars with guard's accommodation ==
Early steam locomotive hauled passenger trains often had a van compartment replacing one of the passenger compartments in one of the carriages; vans so-fitted included the ABD, AD and BD classes. The late 1880s onwards saw some bogie carriages fitted out with a similar style of guard's accommodation, in the AD^{AD}, ABD^{ABD} and BD^{BD} of 1887, 1891 and 1900 respectively. The bogie cars were reclassed AC, ABC and BC in 1910, and the fixed-wheel vehicles became XYZ, XZ and YZ respectively (while the pure guard's vans, classed D, became the ubiquitous Z vans).

Narrow gauge trains often ran with ^{N}BD^{BD} vans, the first built in 1899. These were recoded to a much simpler NBC in 1910.

From 1910 over a hundred AC^{P} carriages were built, intended for later conversion to electric traction. The "P" suffix to the code indicated the central corridor running the length of the eight passenger compartments, though this did not connect with the guard's area at one end. The suburban electric multiple unit fleet was provided with guard's accommodation from the introduction of the Swing Door and Tait trains in 1919, both having a two-man crew with a motorman (driver) and guard. Communication bells between driver and guard were not provided until the Harris trains of 1956, eliminating the use of green flags to indicated 'right of way' for departure from stations. The later Harris trains were also the first to introduce guard controlled power operated doors to Victorian passenger trains, this being continued on the Hitachi trains of 1972.

From around the late 1930s, the wooden BCE and BCPL cars were often used as guard vans. By the 1980s the new build N type carriage sets included an ACN carriage with guard's accommodation, as did the rebuilt H and Z sets' BCH and ACZ/BCZ cars.

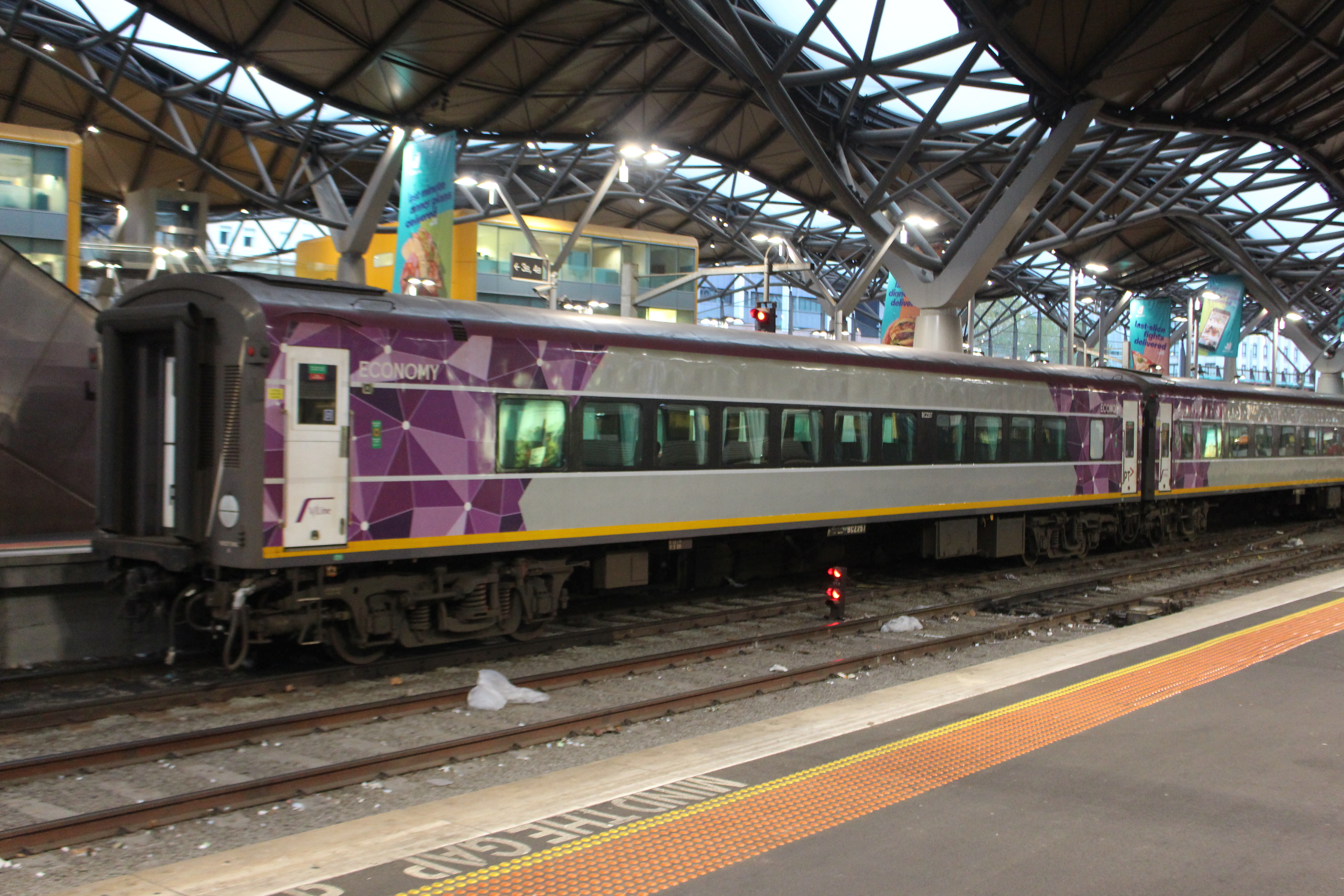
BCZ257 at Southern Cross on Platform 4

== Mail vans ==
=== Fixed wheel stock ===
- E 1-22
- DMS 1-5 → ZDS

=== Pre-vestibule bogie stock ===
- BE^{BE} 1 & 2 → BE → BDS → WW
- DD → DDMS 1 & 2 → CDS → C 47 & 48
- O 17 → EES 3 → DS 3 → WW 4

=== E type carriages ===
- ESBV 1–10 → BDSE → BCE 1–5, BE 44–48
- EEB 1, 2 → D (E type)
- EES 1, 2 → DS → D 3, 4(E type)
- D Steel Van (replacement for D1)

=== S type carriage ===
- DS 1 → CS 2 → VHN (S type)

From the late 1920s onwards passenger trains ran faster, and less running time meant that on-board sorting of mail was no longer practical. As a result, the onboard mail sorting carriages were removed and converted to other uses, with mail instead being carried in standard bogie boxvans or louvre vans.

== Demise ==
The 1980s saw a corporatisation and modernisation of the Victorian Railways, which was rebranded as VicRail, and then as V/Line. Working practices were altered, with freight trains having their guard's vans and guards abolished from 1985.

As the vans were withdrawn they were assembled into long collections in spare sidings around the state. An example given in June 1987 was a set of 32 vans stored at South Dynon's Canal Sidings, in two rakes. From the east end, the consists were:

- 23VVBP - 30CP - 61VVBP - 3VVBP - 78VVBP - 3BVVEY - 2VVBP - 14VVAP - 1VVEY - 5VVEY, and
- 15VVDY - 19ZF - 9ZMF - 6VVDY - 10VVDY - 5ZF - 36VVDY - 12ZF - 36VVDY - 19C - 32C - 6VVAP - 39VVDY - 32VVDY - 69VVBP - 7VVEY - 79VVBP - 19VVBP - 473ZL - 34VVDU - 24CP - 337ZL

Note the two non - bogie vans in the latter set. 473ZL was stencilled "for MetRail ballast only".

Under the New Deal for passenger services guards were relocated from separate vans into compartments inside the new N, Z and H type carriage sets themselves. The guards themselves were removed from passenger trains in 1989, and replaced by conductors.

Driver only suburban trains commenced running in 1993, with the last suburban train crewed by a guard running in November 1995. The Siemens Nexas and X'Trapolis 100 trains delivered since this time have no provision for guards.
