= Coastliner =

Coastliner may refer to:

- Coastliner 700, a bus service operated by Stagecoach
- Yorkshire Coastliner, bus services operated by Transdev Blazefield

== See also ==
- Coast Line (disambiguation)
- Coastline
