= Coast Line =

Coast Line may refer to:

- Coast Line (California), a railroad line
- Coast Line (Denmark), a railroad line
- Coast Line (Sri Lanka), a railroad line

== See also ==
- Coastline
- Coast Lines, a shipping company in the United Kingdom, Ireland, and the Channel Islands from 1917 to 1971
- East Coast Line (disambiguation)
- West Coast Line (disambiguation)
