= West Coast Railway =

West Coast Railway can refer to:

- Avanti West Coast, franchised railway operator in the United Kingdom
- West Coast Railways, railway spot-hire company in the United Kingdom
- West Coast Railway (Victoria), defunct passenger train operator in Australia
- West Coast Railway Association, a rail preservation society in British Columbia, Canada
- Railways on the West Coast of Tasmania
  - West Coast Wilderness Railway, a heritage railway in Tasmania, Australia
- West Coast Main Line, a railway line in the United Kingdom

== See also ==
- West Coast Express (disambiguation)
- West Coast Line (disambiguation)
