= West Coast Express (disambiguation) =

West Coast Express is a commuter railway in Metro Vancouver, Canada.

West Coast Express may also refer to:

- West Coast Express (India), a daily train in India connecting the city of Chennai with the port city of Mangalore in Karnataka
- West Coast Express (ice hockey), an ice hockey line that played for the Vancouver Canucks in the early 2000s

== See also ==
- West Coast Railway (disambiguation)
