= Southern Cross Express =

Australian luxury train operator

Overview
- Service type: Luxury train
- Status: Ceased
- Former operator: Australian Vintage Travel

Route
- Termini: Melbourne
- Stops: Sydney; Canberra

On-board services
- Class: First

Technical
- Rolling stock: South Australian Railways steel

The Southern Cross Express was a luxury train operator in Australia. It was launched in June 1985 as Steam Age operating out of Melbourne on the Victorian Railways broad gauge network. Services were operated by steam locomotive R766 and six South Australian Railways carriages.

In 1987, the carriages were sold to Australian Vintage Travel, who also owned a Douglas DC-3 airplane and the South Steyne ferry, converted to standard gauge and began operating interstate services into New South Wales on the State Rail Authority network. Its first trip was a cruise from Melbourne to Sydney and Canberra hauled by an 81 class in January 1988. It operated a few further trips in 1988 before ceasing.

In 1990, the carriages moved to Goulburn and later Junee Locomotive Depot before moving to Casino in October 1996 for use on Northern Rivers Railroad's Ritz Rail tourist train on the Murwillumbah line.
