= South Australian Railways steel carriage stock =

South Australian Railways passenger cars

South Australian Railways steel country passenger cars
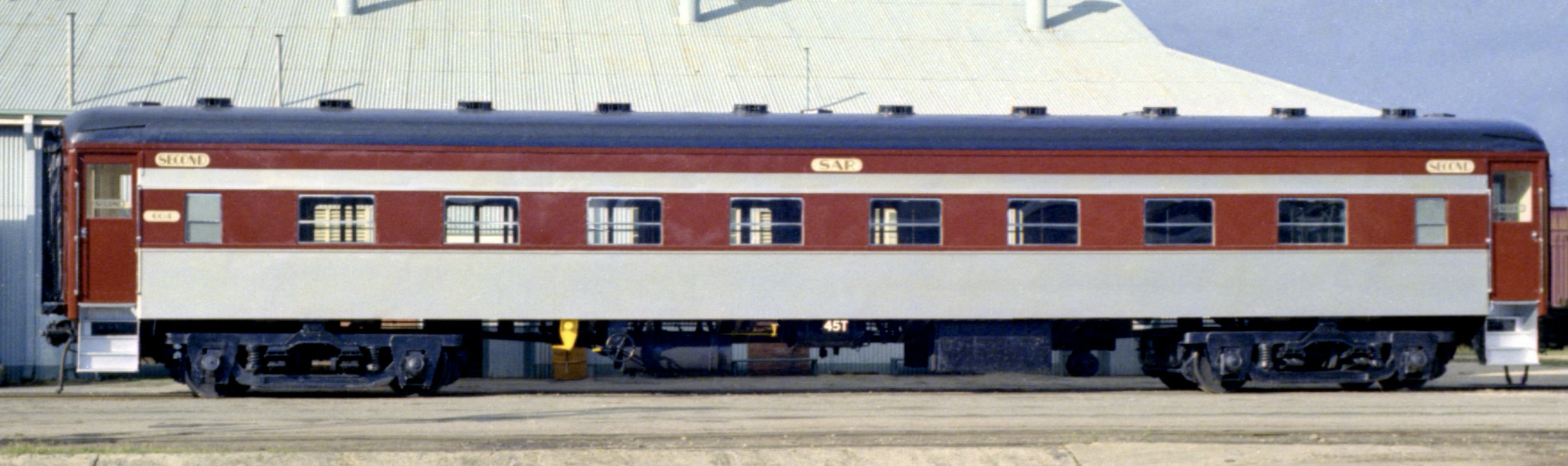
- 600 class passenger car no. 603 at Islington Workshops
- In service: 1936–1998 (1970s to present day with heritage operators)
- Manufacturer: South Australian Railways
- Built at: Islington Railway Workshops
- Constructed: 1936–1942
- Operators: South Australian Railways, V/Line, various heritage operators

Specifications
- Doors: Manual inwards swing, 2 per side; steps to ground level underneath
- Articulated sections: Rubber corridor connectors
- Maximum speed: 115 km/h (71 mph)
- Track gauge: 5 ft 3 in (1600 mm), 4 ft 8 1/2 in (1435 mm) standard gauge

Between 1936 and 1942, the South Australian Railways built 36 steel passenger cars at its Islington Railway Workshops for its country services. All were painted cream and green; they were repainted maroon and silver in the 1960s. Aside from a few written off after accidents, all passed to the Australian National Railways Commission in March 1978.

In the early 1980s, 14 were sold to SteamAge to operate charther services out of Melbourne. In 1987, they were sold to Australian Vintage Travel and converted from broad gauge to standard gauge for use on the Southern Cross Express luxury train in New South Wales. After that operation ceased, the cars were sold to Northern Rivers Railroad. From 1996, that company operated them from Casino, Queensland, on its Ritz Rail tourist train on the Murwillumbah line.

A few remained in service when Australian National's passenger operations were sold to Great Southern Rail in 1997. Four were passed to the West Coast Railway in 1994. Others were sold to SteamRanger in South Australia. Today many are owned by Steamrail Victoria.

== History ==
During the 1920s and early 1930s, the South Australian Railways were revolutionised under Commissioner Webb. After addressing the serious deficiencies in locomotives and freight rolling stock, Webb turned his attention to the quality of passenger accommodation on longer runs around the state. To address these failings, a new fleet of steel passenger carriages was constructed at Islington Workshops to enter service in 1936.

== Design ==
The first 12 cars were of a similar external design; first class carriages were numbered 500 through 503, and second class carriages 600 to 607, in keeping with Webb's preference for numeric over alphabetic categorisation. All cars were painted green with a cream band along the windows, and black for the undergear and roofs. Initially, bogies were fitted with plain bearings to accelerate construction and reduce costs.

All twelve were end-vestibule, side-corridor, compartment-type carriages; the first class cars had room for 42 passengers across seven compartments, and the second class carriages sat 64 in 8 compartments. Each compartment was accessed by twin wooden sliding doors, with etched glass panels fitted. Toilets and were provided at the vestibules. The interior of each car was fitted with polished timber panels, chrome fittings and drop-down windows; the first-class carriages had mirrors between compartments, and arm rests between each seat.

On these and subsequent cars, on either side of the end vestibule was a flap, contiguous with the floor, over which passengers walked on to or from station platforms. When moved to the vertical position (aided by a spring mechanism), the flap gave access to stairs that led to ground level at country stations that did not have a platform.

The cars received a very positive public reaction, and so construction continued with a new series of saloon carriages. These would become the 700, 750 and 780 class cars, with modified window spacings and slightly shorter bodies. These cars had a central aisle with seats either side and toilets in the centre (dividing the smoking and non-smoking sections). Cars 700-715 were exclusively second class, for 56 passengers across 14 bays of four seats; 750-753 were composite first (22) and second (24); and 780-783 were exclusively first class, with two seats on one side of the aisle and four on the other, for a total capacity of 38 passengers.

In the 1940s, several of the 700 class cars were fitted with carpet and higher quality seating, to match the standards of first class vehicles.

The drop-down windows eventually presented maintenance problems, so they were replaced with half-drop windows instead; the lower half of the window was fixed in place.

The cars were repainted to maroon and silver in the late 1960s, to broadly match the scheme of the newer air conditioned vehicles in use on the Overland and other trains.

== Details ==
500 class cars (later: AK)
- Constructed: 1936-1937
- Number built: 4
- Fleet numbers: 500-503, later 1AK/AK500, TA501, AK502, Burrumbeet, Oxley, Terra Australis, Weeroona
- Capacity: 42 1st class passengers

Specifications
- Car body construction: 69 ft 7 1/4 in (21.22 m)
- Car length: 71 ft 8 1/4 in (21.85 m)
- Width: 9 ft 9 in (2.97 m)
- Height: 13 ft 2 in (4.01 m)
- Entry: Dual
- Weight: 41 LT 0 cwt 0 qtr (41.66 t)
- Bogies: 47 ft (14.33 m) centres
- Braking system: Westinghouse
- Coupling system: knuckle
- Track gauge: 5 ft 3 in (1600 mm) and 4 ft 8 1/2 in (1435 mm)

600 class cars (later: BKL, BH, DCK, Bowmans, Brunswick, Clarence, Corangamite, Glenmaggie, Lauriston, Richmond, Tweed, Wedgwood, Wendouree, Wilsons)
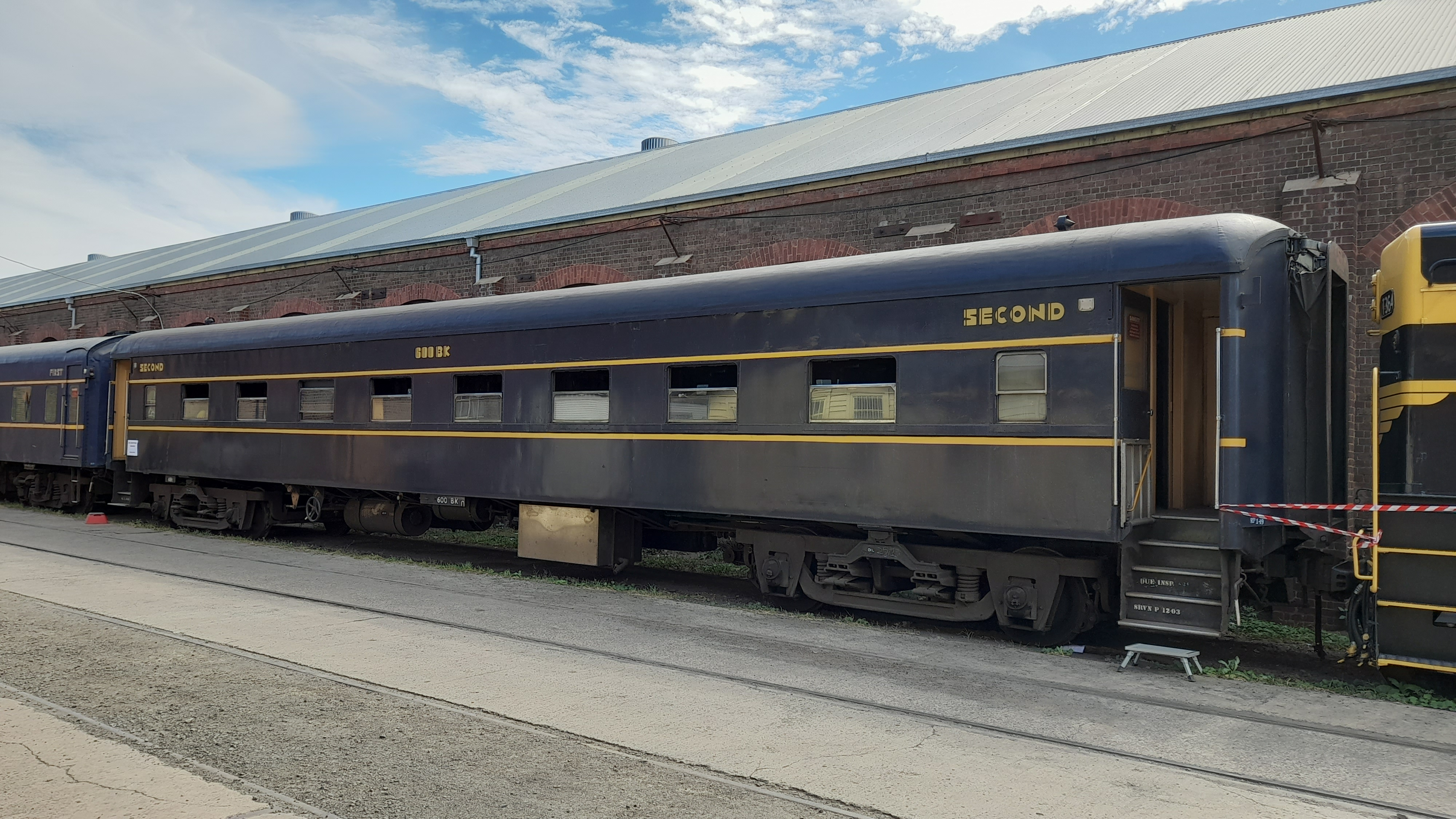
- 600BK as preserved by Steamrail Victoria
- Constructed: 1936-1937
- Number built: 8
- Fleet numbers: 600-607, later 3BKL/BK600, BK603, BK604, BK605
- Capacity: 64 2nd class passengers

Specifications
- Car body construction: 69 ft 7 1/4 in (21.22 m)
- Car length: 71 ft 8 1/4 in (21.85 m)
- Width: 9 ft 9 in (2.97 m)
- Height: 13 ft 2 in (4.01 m)
- Entry: Dual
- Weight: 41 LT 0 cwt 0 qtr (41.66 t)
- Bogies: 47 ft (14.33 m) centres
- Braking system: Westinghouse
- Coupling system: knuckle
- Track gauge: 5 ft 3 in (1600 mm) and 4 ft 8 1/2 in (1435 mm)

700 class cars (later: BK)
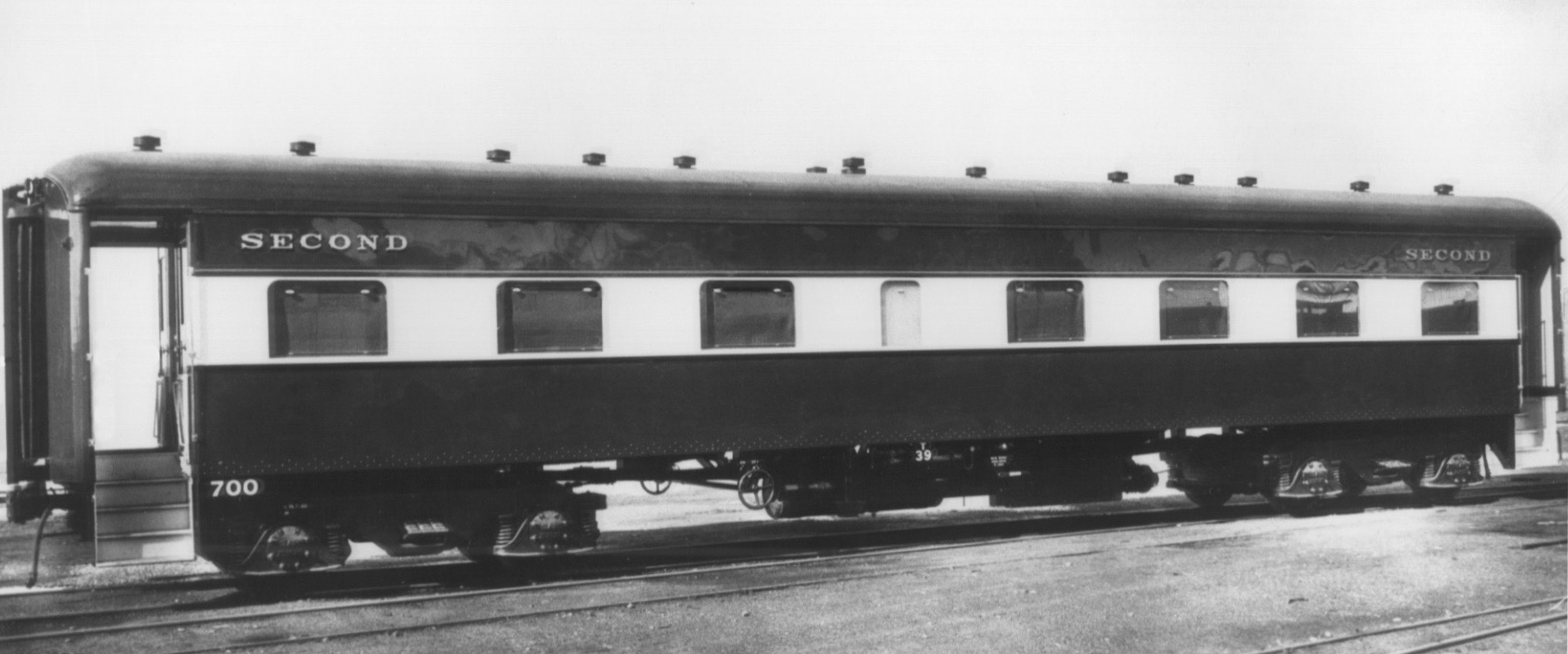
- No. 700 as outshopped from Islington Works, 1940
- Constructed: 1940-1941
- Number built: 16
- Fleet numbers: 700-715, later 1BK, 2BK, later BK700, 702, 703, 711, 712, 714 and 715, LCK708, PCK713, Cape Byron, Eppalock, Johnnie Walker club car, Power Car, Waterford, Wellington
- Capacity: 56 2nd class passengers

Specifications
- Car body construction: 60 ft 6 1/4 in (18.45 m)
- Car length: 62 ft 7 3/4 in (19.09 m)
- Width: 9 ft 9 in (2.97 m)
- Height: 13 ft 2 in (4.01 m)
- Entry: Dual
- Weight: 41 LT 0 cwt 0 qtr (41.66 t)
- Bogies: 40 ft (12.19 m) centres
- Braking system: Westinghouse
- Coupling system: knuckle
- Track gauge: 5 ft 3 in (1600 mm) and 4 ft 8 1/2 in (1435 mm)

750 class cars (later: BE, AK)
- Constructed: 1942
- Number built: 4
- Fleet numbers: 750-753, later BE 346, 351, 352, 358, AK752
- Capacity: 22 1st class passengers & 24 2nd class passengers

Specifications
- Car body construction: 60 ft 6 1/4 in (18.45 m)
- Car length: 62 ft 7 3/4 in (19.09 m)
- Width: 9 ft 9 in (2.97 m)
- Height: 13 ft 2 in (4.01 m)
- Entry: Dual
- Bogies: 40 ft (12.19 m) centres
- Braking system: Westinghouse
- Coupling system: knuckle
- Track gauge: 5 ft 3 in (1600 mm) and 4 ft 8 1/2 in (1435 mm)

780 class cars (later: BF, DC, ABK)
- Constructed: 1942
- Number built: 4
- Fleet numbers: 780-783; later DC783 Lowanna, BF343-345, ABK782
- Capacity: 38 1st class passengers

Specifications
- Car body construction: 60 ft 6 1/4 in (18.45 m)
- Car length: 62 ft 7 3/4 in (19.09 m)
- Width: 9 ft 9 in (2.97 m)
- Height: 13 ft 2 in (4.01 m)
- Entry: Dual
- Bogies: 40 ft (12.19 m) centres
- Braking system: Westinghouse
- Coupling system: knuckle
- Track gauge: 5 ft 3 in (1600 mm) and 4 ft 8 1/2 in (1435 mm)

In 1973, car 783 was converted to a "departmental car". This involved stripping the interior, and fitting a kitchen and sleeping compartments for up to eight people, as support for the Vice-Regal car and Commissioner's car, Murray. The car was fitted with a 3-phase power supply, and this was used when the vehicle was included in the Commissioners' Train. As rebuilt, the car was painted red and allocated the code DC783. No air conditioning was fitted; the bogies had come from the Cafeteria Car, which had been shifted across to Commonwealth style bogies.

It was a common sight on broad-gauge passenger trains to Port Pirie circa 1978, when it provided head-end power for an RBJ buffet car while the Cafeteria Car was unavailable.

When the South Australian Railways was sold to the Australian Government in 1975 (to become Australian National Railways, later Australian National), the vehicle was retained by the South Australian State Government. It was officially withdrawn in 1986, then leased to SteamRanger and named Lowanna in 1990. In 1995 the car was transferred to become a static exhibit at the Port Dock Railway Museum (now National Railway Museum, Port Adelaide); ten years later it was sold to a person who placed the car under the care of the Victorian Goldfields Railway in Maldon. In 2022, the car was sold to 707 Operations.

== In service ==
=== South Australian Railways (1936-1975) ===
When the cars first entered service, they were used on fixed consists for specific rosters. As the fleet grew they replaced many of the older vehicles, which were progressively scrapped or held for occasional use such as on the Centenary Train.

Through the 1960s, windows were replaced and the exteriors were repainted from the green-cream-black scheme to a red-silver-black scheme, to match the livery applied to the newer fleet of air-conditioned country passenger cars and 900 and 930 class diesel-electric locomotives. Later, red covered the roofs and sides.

In 1962, car 705 caught fire, and the following year it was condemned, written off and scrapped.

==== Standard gauge use (1968-1974) ====
In December 1968, four compartment carriages were converted to standard gauge, for use on the first runs between Peterborough and Broken Hill. The cars were 500, 501, 600 and 601, and these were included in the first passenger run on the new line, on 16 January 1969.

600 returned to broad gauge in 1972, and the other three in 1974, as they were superseded by other stock.

=== Australian National (1975-1997) ===
The South Australian Railways was sold to the Australian federal government in 1975, and most of the rolling stock was included in that transfer. DC783 ex No.783 was retained by the State for special occasions; with 705 scrapped, that left 34 broad gauge carriages to be transferred.

==== Standard gauge use (1977-1991) ====
In July 1977, three cars were transferred across to standard gauge for fast, mixed goods services. Cars 780, 781 and 782 became BF cars 343, 344 and 345 respectively. The BF code was defined as "non-air conditioned economy class sitting car with cooking facilities". It is not clear where any such cooking facilities may have been constructed, but they may have taken over the space previously allocated to the short (3-window) saloon. The cars were repainted into red with a tan roof, black undergear and silver stripes to match the scheme of the short-haul Commonwealth Railways passenger stock.

In November of the same year, 750 was transferred to standard gauge as BE346, a regular economy-class sitting carriage. It was followed in 1979 by 752 as BE351 and 1980 by 753 as BE352 and 751 as BE358.

In 1983, two cars were burnt; BE352 had one end destroyed on 13 August, so it was written off. BF344's interior was obliterated a few months later, such that the car shell was tipped off the track to recover only the bogies. Both were last noted at Stirling North in early 1988.

In 1990, cars BF343, BE346, BE351 and BE358 were stored at Port Pirie, leaving BF345 as the only class member still in service with Australian National. It was written off in November 1992, but instead of scrapping the vehicle was seconded to Islington Railway Workshops for refurbishment as an additional vehicle for The Explorer.

==== V/Line (1983-1992) ====
When V/Line introduced its "New Deal for Country Passengers" in 1981, the intention was to provide an all-steel, all-air-conditioned fleet of carriages, and retire the old timber-bodied cars. The existing carriage fleet was not sufficient to achieve that goal so, while former suburban Harris carriages were undergoing refurbishment to become short-haul H-class cars, V/Line hired carriages 702, 703 and 715 from Australian National on 8 March 1983. Car 715 was found to have significant rust and was returned in May 1983. As a replacement, Australian National sent 500 on 16 September 1983, and 600 on 30 September 1983.

The hired cars were refurbished and painted in the older Victorian Railways scheme of blue with gold stripes, to avoid any impression that the vehicles were of the same quality as the new air-conditioned cars that were being introduced concurrently. The hired carriages were used as a fixed consist on services that were later run using the converted H-class cars. While in V/Line service, the South Australian cars were classed BK1 and BK2, AK1 and BKL3, ex 702, 703, 500 and 600 respectively. BK1 was the first to enter service on 3 June 1983, followed by BK2 on 13 August 1983, AK1 on 17 October 1983 and BKL3 on 14 December 1983.

Circa 1986, AK1 was reclassified from first class to economy, to match the single-class, short-haul H-type carriages. It is not known if the capacity of the car was increased from 42 to 56, but that is unlikely. In 1991, BK2 had one of its toilet compartments converted to a conductor's office, eliminating the need to use a guard's van.

During its time with V/Line, car 607 was sold privately, refurbished, painted blue and gold, and reclassified 1BH. It was offered to V/Line for use on regular services but that was deemed unnecessary and, in 1987, the car was restored to its previous identity.

Code	Set No.	From	To	Car F	Car E	Car D	Car C	Car B	Car A (East end)	Capacity	Weight	Length	Changes to achieve	Notes
K	No number	1983-08-03	1991-04-16			BK1(?)	BK2(?)	BKL3(?)	AK1	218	154t	82m		Order of cars uncertain
K	No number	1991-04-17	1992-07-13			BK2	BK1(?)	BKL3(?)	AK1	218	154t	82m	BK2 fitted with conductor's compartment	Order of middle cars uncertain.

==== The Explorer (1993) ====
The four V/Line cars were returned to Australian National on 13 July 1992, and placed into storage. After a short period they were refurbished and repainted into a blue, yellow and white scheme for a new tourist train called The Explorer, but the project was soon abandoned and the cars were returned to indefinite storage. Cars BE358 (ex 751) and BF345 (ex 782) were to be included in the project, but the refurbishment had not started when it became clear that the project was short-lived.

==== Disposal ====
In 1981, most of Australian National's fleet of non-air conditioned vehicles was sold off.

Cars 503, 602, 606, 701, 704, 706, 710 and 712 were purchased by SteamRanger and restored for use on their line.

Cars 501, 502, 601, 603, 604, 605, 607, 700, 707, 708, 709, 711, 713 and 714 were purchased by SteamAge and transferred to Victoria, with the intent to operate mainline tours behind locomotive R766.

The November 1985 Newsrail records the following dispositions, but does not acknowledge the 750 or 780 classes:

Carriage	Commentary
500	Owned by Australian National. On hire to V/Line as AK1. In V/Line service 17 October 1983.
501	Owned by Steamage Australia. In Service. Named Weeroona.
502	Owned by Steamage Australia. In Service. Named Burrumbeet.
503	Owned/allotted to ARHS (SA Division)
600	Owned by Australian National. On hire to V/Line as BKL3. In V/Line service 14 December 1983.
601	Owned by Steamage Australia. In Service.
602	Owned/allotted to ARHS (SA Division)
603	Owned by Steamage Australia. In Service. Named Lauriston.
604	Owned by Steamage Australia. In Service. Named Corangamite.
605	Owned by Steamage Australia. In Service. Named Wendouree.
606	Owned/allotted to ARHS (SA Division)
607	Owned by Steamage Australia. On hire to V/Line and classified BH1. Yet to enter V/Line service, believed to be blackbanned by unions.
700	Owned by Steamage Australia.
701	Owned/allotted to ARHS (SA Division)
702	Owned by Australian National. On hire to V/Line as BK1. In V/Line service 4 June 1983.
703	Owned by Australian National. On hire to V/Line as BK2. In V/Line service 28 July 1983.
704	Owned/allotted to ARHS (SA Division)
705	Condemned in South Australia prior to October 1981 (?)
706	Owned/allotted to ARHS (SA Division)
707	Owned by Steamage Australia. In service as Club car. Named Johnnie Walker.
708	Owned by Steamage Australia.
709	Owned by Steamage Australia.
710	Owned/allotted to ARHS (SA Division)
711	Owned by Steamage Australia.
712	Owned/allotted to ARHS (SA Division)
713	Owned by Steamage Australia.
714	Owned by Steamage Australia.
715	Owned by Australian National. Delivered ex Adelaide 8 March 1983 to V/Line. Believed returned to Australian National due to bad condition of car. Current location unknown.

The three standard gauge vehicles remaining, BF343 (ex 780), BE346 (ex 750) and BE351 (ex 752), were railed from Port Pirie to Murwillumbah in 1991, following a sale from Australian National to the Northern Rivers Railroad.

Cars 500, 600, 702, 703, 751 and 782 were retained by Australian National up its sale of stock to Great Southern Rail in 1997.

=== Great Southern Railway ===
The breakup and sale of Australian National from 1992 finally caught up with the fleet, and on 1 November 1997 the remaining six vehicles - 500, 600, 702, 703, 751 and 782 - were included in the sale of rolling stock to Great Southern Rail. The company had very little use for 60-year-old, non-air conditioned stock, and so they were on-sold in June 1998 to Steamrail Victoria.

The cars were transferred on standard gauge bogies to Melbourne.

== In preservation ==
=== Steamranger ===
Cars 503, 602, 606, 701, 704, 706, 710 and 712 were purchased by SteamRanger in 1981 and restored for use on their line. 602 was modified during the restoration, becoming a 24-seat tavern/refreshment car, with a brake and guard compartment at one end. In the new form it was named Bowmans, and it entered service in 1983. Car 715 was owned by SteamRanger for a short period up to 1999, when it was sold to Steve Moritz for his Murraylander project.

==== Murraylander ====
In 2000, two of the cars, 606 and 712, were sold by SteamRanger to Steve Moritz following his purchase of 715. 606 was purchased by the Port Dock Railway Museum at the end of 2000 and delivered in 2001; expressions of interest were sought by the Australian Locomotive and Railway Carriage Co for sale of 712 and 715 in 2010. Around the same time, ALRCCo organised the sale and transfer of car 714 from Steamrail to Tailem Bend.

=== SteamAge Australia ===
In 1981, SteamAge Australia purchased fourteen of the carriages, and these were railed from Adelaide to Melbourne departing 3 December 1981 as a single consist. The cars were planned to be refurbished and named after Victorian lakes. The inaugural run of the Melbourne Limited fleet, with some of the newly refurbished carriages, was on Saturday 15 June 1986 to Swan Hill.

Cars 501, 502, 601, 603, 604, 605, 607, 700, 707, 708, 709, 711, 713 and 714 were included in the purchase.

604 and 707 were first noted in service at Spencer Street on 25 October 1984.

Within a few years most had been restored for service; they became Weeroona (ex 501), Burrumbeet (ex 502), Lauriston (ex 603), Corangamite (ex 604), Wendouree (ex 605), Johnnie Walker (club car ex 707), and Eppalock (power car ex 713). All cars had been restored to variant of the South Australian Railways' original green with cream livery. 607 had been sold privately and restored as 1BH in Victorian Railways blue and gold, and offered to V/Line for their use; the offer was knocked back, and the car is only thought to have run in a few enthusiast specials.

At various points the fleet had been paired with CP vans 24, 30 and 35.

In 1987, SteamAge collapsed, and the vehicles were sold to Australian Vintage Travel.

==== Australian Vintage Travel ====
When SteamAge collapsed in 1987, the fleet was sold to Australian Vintage Travel and converted to standard gauge, for a service called The Southern Cross Express. 607/BH1 was included in the sale, and it along with the seven restored cars were converted across to standard gauge. They were joined by Wedgewood, a dining car converted from 602, and the first run of this consist was to Seymour on Friday 11 December 1987, followed with a promotional tour to Canberra on Friday 22nd to Sunday 24 January 1988.

The company went into receivership in July 1988, and all the vehicles were put out to tender. Cars 501 and 707 were sold privately; the remaining standard gauge cars were sold to the Northern Rivers Scenic Railway in New South Wales, along with 708 which had been part way through conversion to a second club car (to be named Wellington), and the uncompleted 700, 709, 711 and 714 were left in storage at Steamrail's compound in Newport, Victoria.

==== Northern Rivers Scenic Railway ====
The NRSR intended to use the cars for services in northern New South Wales on the Murwillumbah line. On 29 December 1989 the eight cars already on standard gauge were transferred to Goulburn roundhouse as a temporary staging point before later being shifted further north. In 1991 they were joined by the three cars which had been stored at Port Pirie - 750, 752 and 780.

In 1999, the complete ex-SteamAge Northern Rivers fleet entered service as their Ritz Rail train, with sitting cars Oxley (ex 502), Clarence (ex 603), Wilsons (ex 604), Brunswick (ex 605), dining cars Tweed (ex 601) and Richmond (ex 607), club car Cape Byron (ex 708) and Power Car (ex 713). It appears that cars 750, 752 and 780 may not have re-entered service at the time, and their whereabouts following the sale of the rest of the fleet is unknown.

In May 2004, the Ritz Rail train was transferred from Murwillumbah to Lithgow for long-term storage, and in 2010 the fleet was shifted to Parkes for a stock auction.

==== West Coast Railway ====
In 1994, West Coast Railway acquired the remaining four cars from Newport - 700, 709, 711 and 714. These were transferred to Ballarat Workshops for restoration, and within a few years three of them had re-entered service as excursion class vehicles. 709 was kept at Ballarat as a source of spare parts.

When the company folded the four vehicles were sold to Steamrail. While in West Coast Railways service they used the code BK, following on from V/Line's use of that code for 702 and 703 in the period 1983–1992.

709 was scrapped in 2011 at Ballarat East.

==== Private sales ====
When Australian Vintage Travel folded, two of their vehicles were sold privately.

Weeroona, previously car 501, was sold in 1989 and re-entered service in 1993 with an end deck, kitchen and dining facilities, and only three compartments retained. It was named Terra Australis and coded TA501. By 1994 the vehicle had been repainted into blue with gold stripes and a white roof, with the new identity Terror Australis.

The other private sale was car 707, which had been a club car named Waterford under Australian Vintage Travel, and previously the Johnnie Walker Club Car under SteamAge. By 1992 it had been rebuilt as an observation car at Thirlmere in New South Wales, and coded ABM707. Since then it has been renamed Crux Australis.

Two blue carriages, potentioally but not definitively 501 and 707, were sighted at Goulburn in June 2023.

=== Steamrail Victoria ===
In 1998, Steamrail acquired the first six members of their ex-South Australian Railways fleet, with cars 500, 600, 702, 703, 751 and 782 purchased from Great Southern Rail and railed from Adelaide to Melbourne, then converted to broad gauge and moved to Newport Workshops. The cars were reclassified as AK500, BKL600, BK702, BK703, AK751 and ABK782; the latter two were unusual, as 751 had previously been a composite carriage and 782 exclusively first class. AK500, BK600 (no longer BKL) and BK702 were repainted into blue with gold; BK703 was retained in The Explorer livery, and the other two are not listed on the Steamrail website.

In 2004, Steamrail purchased the four carriages previously owned by West Coast Railway - BK700, BK709, BK711 and BK714. BK700 had been repainted to Victorian Railways blue by 2005, while BK711 retained in West Coast Railway scheme. In August 2010 expressions of interest were sought for the sale of BK714, which has since been moved to Tailem Bend. At this time the remains of BK709 were still stored at Ballarat East; it was finally scrapped on 21 May 2011.

Finally in 2010, the remnants of the Ritz Rail fleet were sold off. An auction initially saw many cars passed in, but Steamrail purchased dining cars Tweed (ex 601) and Richmond (ex 607) along with van CP24. After the sale, CP24 was swapped for sitting car Oxley (ex 502). At the same time, the power car was purchased by a private individual with connections to Steamrail.

Of the new acquisitions, Oxley, Tweed, Richmond and Power Car were railed to Islington railway Workshops for refurbishment in 2012, and emerged in a variant of Victorian Railways blue and gold with white roofs to distinguish them from the broad gauge stock. The cars were allocated codes, respectively AK502, DCK601, DCK607 and PCK713. There were stored for a time at Seymour in the SRHC compound, before being used on their first tour at the start of 2016, connecting with a broad gauge train at Ararat.

603, 604 and 605 were stored around the Dimboola turntable; at some point previously, 605 had been fitted with marker lights.

600, 703 and 711 suffered fire damage following two arson attacks at Steamrail's Newport Workshops depot in 2015. 600 returned to service in 2017 but 703 and 711 both remain stored as of September 2023.

In June 2023, the Australian Locomotive and Railway Carriage Company (ALARC) sent Murraylander-liveried diesel locomotive 701 from Tailem Bend to Albury and return to transfer a number of standard gauge carriages between heritage rail operators.

On arrival at Dimboola, the locomotive was used to organise the carriages, then proceed with the first batch to McIntyre, where BK702 was removed by N469 and transferred to South Dynon, pending gauge conversion and a return to Newport Workshops. The remaining carriages continued to Albury, delivering CP24-AK502-DCK601-BK604-BK603-AK500 to the yard; they were then collected by engine 42107 and railed to Goulburn for future use on The Picnic Train. Engine 701 then returned from Albury to Dimboola, conveying retired V/Line carriage set SN8, cars BN7-BN10-BRN34-ACN24 previously shunted from Ettamogah, and then added PCK713 and CP30 for the trip back to Tailem Bend.

Documentation in advance of the move indicates BK605 was also to be moved as part of the transfer but this did not happen due to issues found during a trial run the previous day.

Car DCK607 was returned to broad gauge and was scheduled to make its first public appearance at the March 2026 open weekend at Newport Railway Workshops.

=== 707 Operations ===
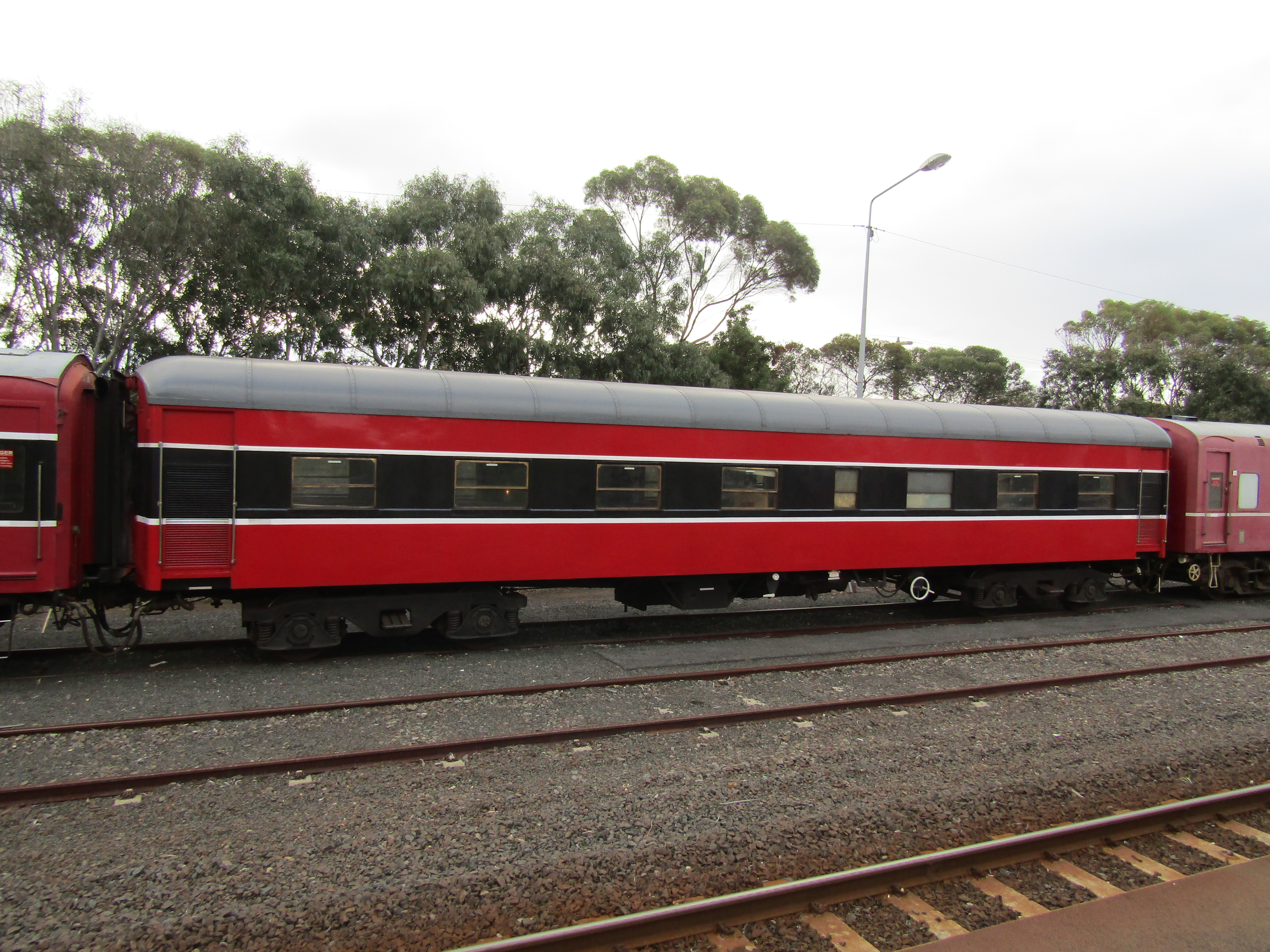
BK708 at Sale railway station as preserved by 707 Operations

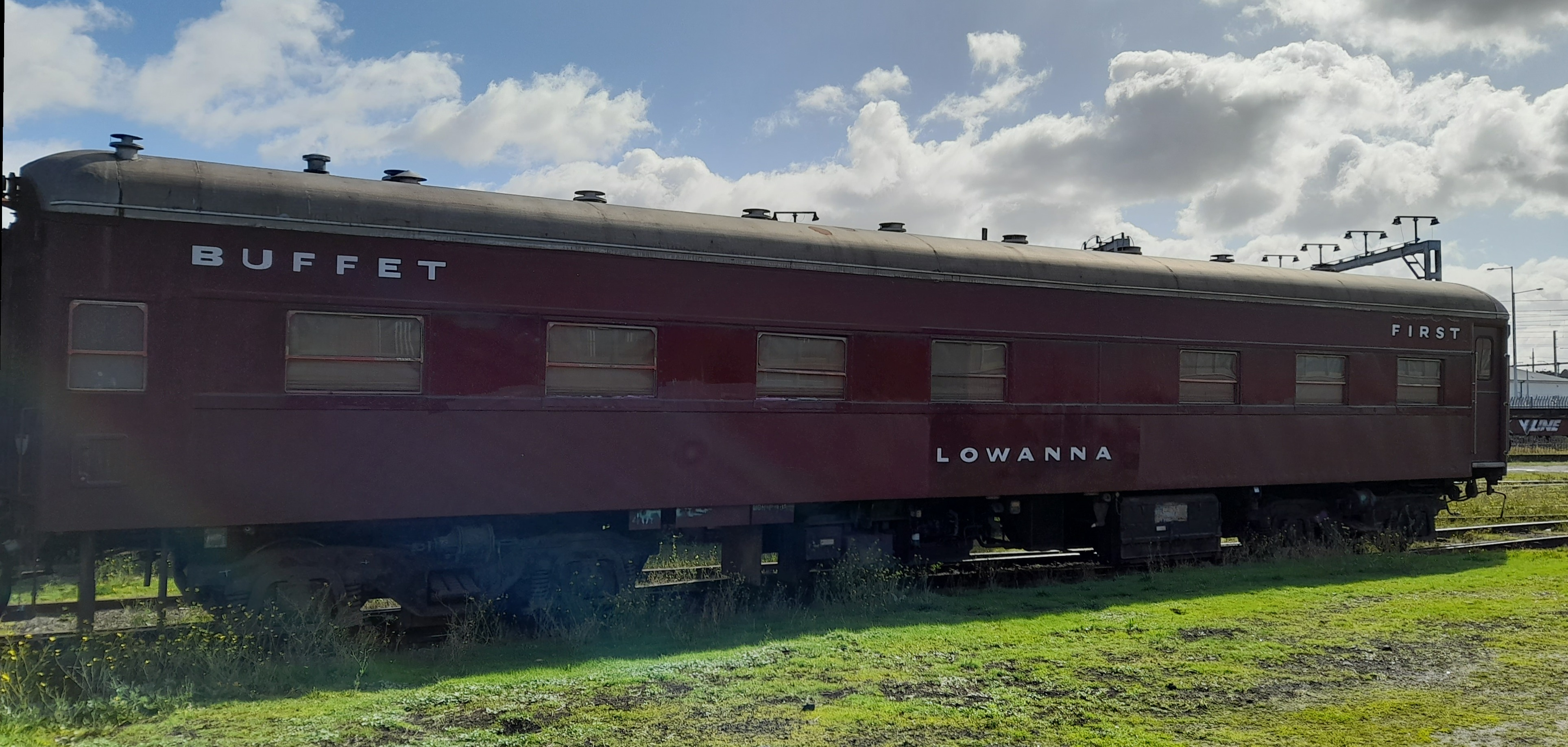
DC783 in 2022

At the sale of the Ritz Rail stock, car 708 was purchased by a private individual with connections to 707 Operations. The car has since been classed LCK. Its original return to service saw a livery with red above and below the window line, and a black stripe across; the latter has since been swapped with red, matching other vehicles in the 707 Operations fleet. In 2022, 707 Operations purchased 783 from its private owners.

=== Victorian Goldfields Railway ===
Car DC783 was acquired privately and restored to service on the Victorian Goldfields Railway in 2005, named Lowanna. It is permitted on the V/Line network, but a note in the network service plan addenda says that it "requires a clearance assessment prior to each path approval on V/Line Network. Only allowed on the V/Line Network with steps removed."

=== Espee Rail Services ===
As at 17 October 2016, Espee Rail Services was authorised to operate standard gauge trains in Victoria, using the passenger cars AK500 and 502, BK 600, 603, 604, 605, 700, 702, 703, 711, 712, 714 and 715, dining cars DCK 601 and 607, lounge car LCK708, power van PCK713 and supply vans CP24, 30 and 35. However, there is no evidence that cars 500, 600, 607, 700, 702, 708 and CP35 have been placed on standard gauge.

As noted above under the Steamrail entry, these cars were distributed to other operators in 2023.
