= East Coast Line =

The East Coast Line may refer to:

- KTM East Coast railway line, Malaysia
- East Coast Line (Sweden)
- East Coast Main Line, United Kingdom
- Howrah–Chennai main line in India
- Thomson–East Coast Line, Singapore
- "The East Coast Line" (Coastal Railways with Julie Walters), a TV documentary episode

== See also ==
- East Coast Railway zone, Indian Railways
