= TransVolution =

Australian rail transport operator

- Company type: Proprietary company
- Industry: Rail transport
- Founded: 21 November 2013 in Melbourne, Australia
- Founder: Aaron Hore
- Headquarters: Docklands, Melbourne, Australia
- Area served: East coast of Australia
- Services: Rail transport, Rail services
- Website: http://www.transvolution.com.au/

TransVolution is a privately owned rail transport business in Australia. TransVolution is an accredited rail transport operator in Victoria, New South Wales and South Australia.

== History ==
TransVolution started out as a logistics consulting and transport equipment design business. It moved into rolling stock leasing and then rail operations with the acquisition of Masked Fox in 2014.

On 31 August 2015, TransVolution received accreditation from the National Rail Safety Regulator. As at 12 March 2020, TransVolution Operations Pty Ltd is accredited to operate rolling stock in Victoria, New South Wales and South Australia.

== Fleet ==
TransVolution has the locomotive fleet set out in the below table. It purchased one 700 and two 830 class locomotives from Genesee & Wyoming Australia.

=== Owned ===
Class	Image	Type	Gauge	Top speed (km/h)	Built	Number	Notes
700		Diesel-electric	Broad	112	1972	1	Ex Genesee & Wyoming Australia 704
830		Diesel-electric	Broad	120	1960-1962	2	Ex Genesee & Wyoming Australia 831, 841

=== Leased ===
Class	Image	Type	Gauge	Top speed (km/h)	Built	Number	Notes
