= South Australian Railways East-West Stock =

South Australian passenger cars and brake vans

South Australian Railways East-West carriages
- Manufacturer: South Australian Railways
- Built at: Islington Railway Workshops
- Operators: South Australian Railways, Australian National Railways / Australian National, V/Line, Great Southern Rail

Specifications
- Articulated sections: Rubber corridor connectors
- Maximum speed: 70 mph (113 km/h)
- Power supply: Axle generators, later head end power 415vAC
- Braking system: Westinghouse
- Coupling system: Autocouplers
- Track gauge: 5 ft 3 in (1,600 mm) & 4 ft 8 1/2 in (1,435 mm)

This article describes the nine airconditioned sitting cars and fourteen brake vans that were built by the South Australian Railways at Islington Workshops between 1964 and 1967. All were distinguished by fluted stainless steel panels on their sides, compatible with the appearance of cars introduced to The Overland in 1950.

The new cars ran on the East-West Express between Adelaide and Port Pirie in lieu of late-1930s, non-airconditioned main line passenger cars. The broad gauge system had been extended north to Port Pirie in 1937 to meet a southern extension from Port Augusta on the Commonwealth Railways' standard gauge system, creating Port Pirie as a break-of-gauge and transshipment point. To encourage passengers to use the line despite the inconvenience of changing trains, a cafeteria car – the forerunner of The Overland cars – had been built in 1947. The new sitting cars were also allocated to the Blue Lake Express to Mount Gambier. The guard's vans operated widely on the SAR and, in the 1980s, the Victorian Railways.

== Fleet details ==
=== Cafeteria car C1 ===
Cafeteria car (C1)
- In service: 1947-1986
- Constructed: 1947
- Refurbished: 1967
- Number built: 1
- Number preserved: 1
- Fleet numbers: C1
- Capacity: 45 diners

Specifications
- Car body construction: 73 ft 1 in (22.28 m)
- Car length: 76 ft 4 in (23.27 m)
- Width: 9 ft 9 in (2.97 m)
- Height: 13 ft 2 3/4 in (4.03 m)
- Weight: 44 LT 2 cwt 0 qtr (44.81 t)
- Bogies: 51 ft (15.54 m) centres

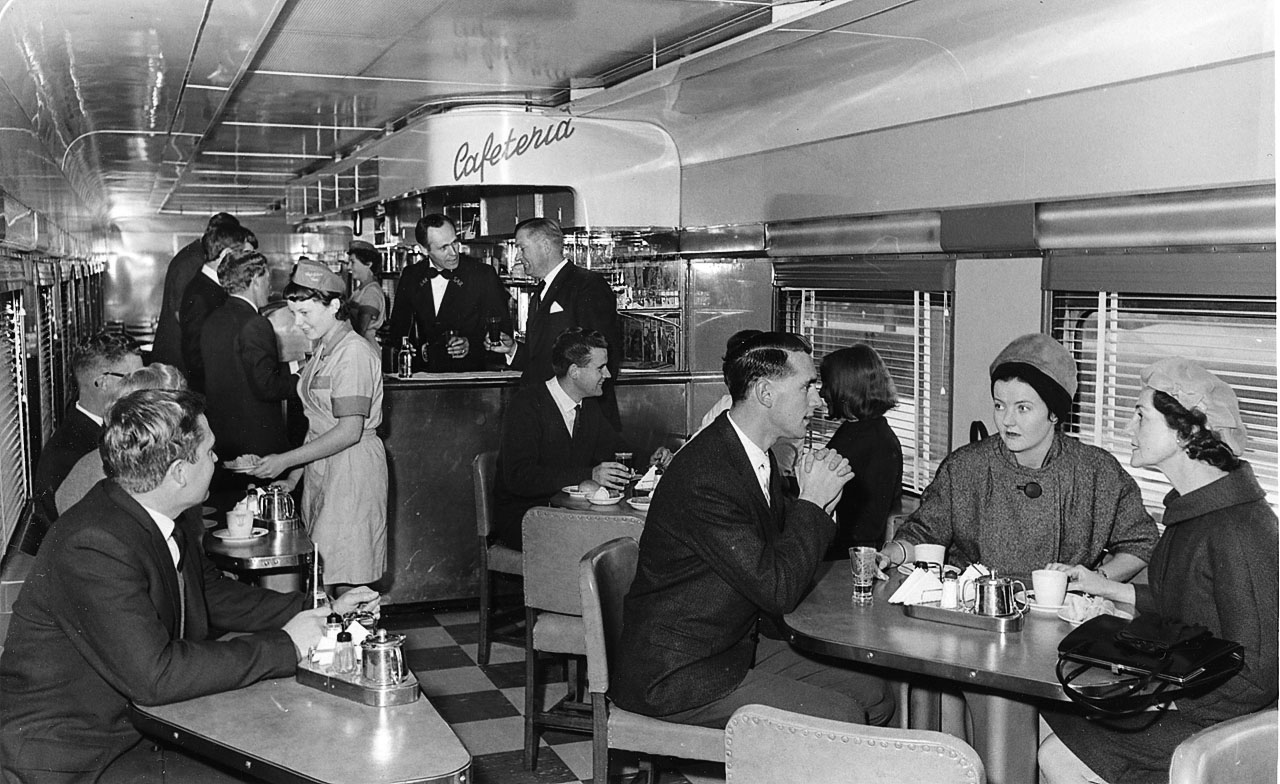
PR photo of cafeteria car passengers

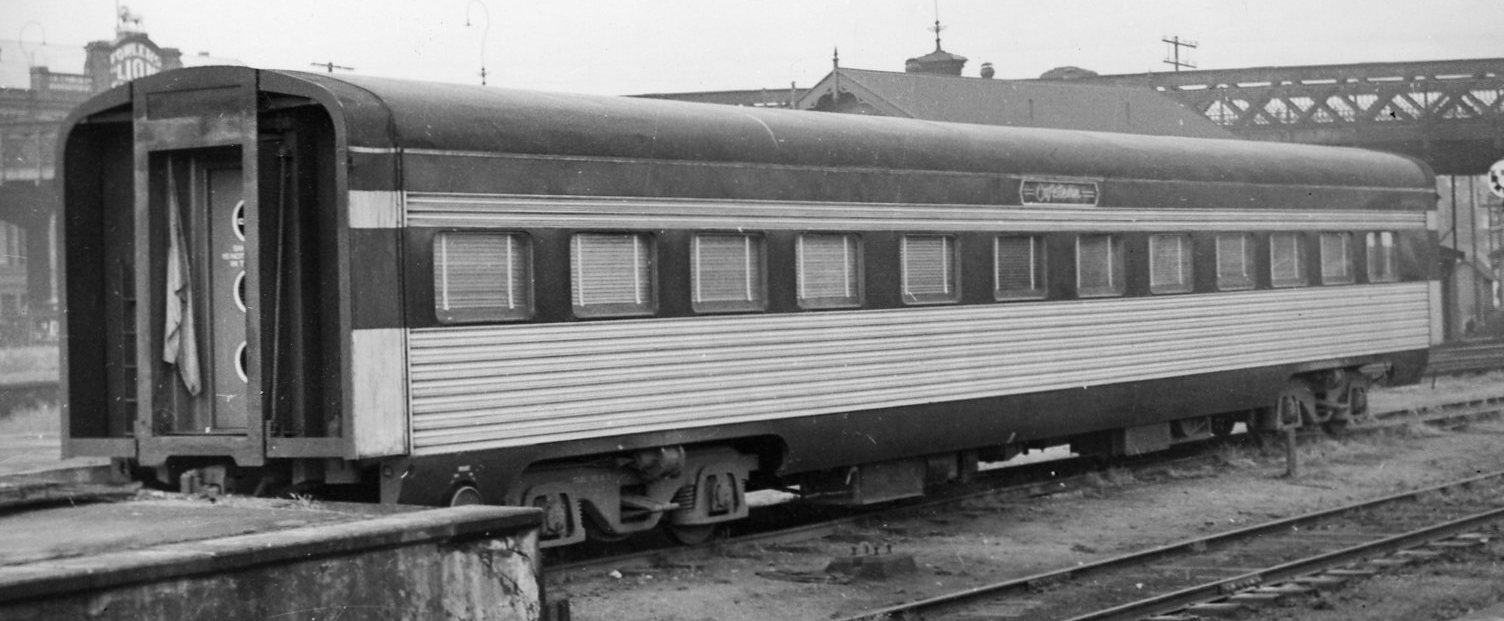
C1 in its original configuration (1950s, Adelaide railway station)

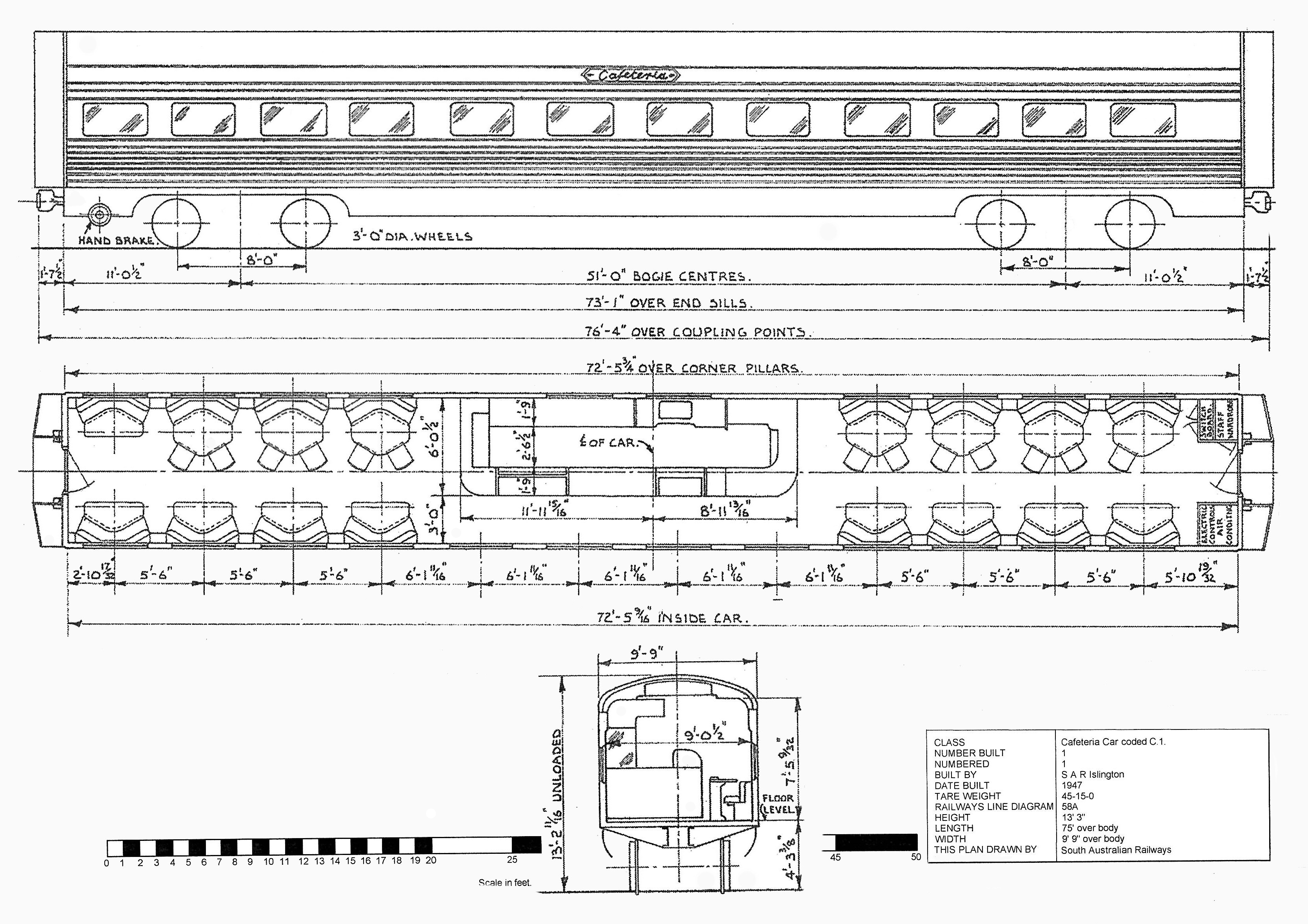
South Australian Railways general arrangement drawing of car C1

One cafeteria car, number C1, was constructed at the South Australian Railways' Islington Railway Workshops in 1947, as one of the first Australian railway vehicles utilising corrugated stainless steel plates for the exterior. The design was based on contemporary streamliner cars in the United States, which had been seen by the Chief Mechanical Engineer, Frank Harrison, on his tour to the United States soon after World War II. It was the prototype for concepts to be included in the new fleet of cars for The Overland, and was intended to "surpass other buffet cars" in manufacture quality and passenger comfort; the design was detailed down to the level of the food trays, which were introduced on the vehicle long before they became common practice on airlines.

The car was not used on the Adelaide–Melbourne Overland service, since it included stops at on-platform refreshment rooms en route, and remnant dining cars (such as Avoca and Hopkins) from the pre-corrugated era were kept in service. Instead it was deployed on the Adelaide–Port Pirie line that linked up with the Trans-Australian service.

The car was constructed using the side frames as the primary load-carrying system, with formed steel channels forming the body sides between the window frames; the sum framework of each vehicle comprises well over four hundred parts. Rockwool insulation was packed into the side voids, sewn in place with copper wire, and the body was finished with fluted aluminium strips (later stainless steel) riveted or screwed in place, giving the classic look of the series.

Harrison had originally specified Plymetl for the interior partitions, which was a five-sheet-thick plywood with steel panels on the exterior. It was unavailable at the time owing to government financial policy, so a similar material was obtained from England, called Plymax.

The car was fitted with an underfloor generator set in addition to the standard axle-driven generator; both were used to supply power to the air conditioning system (the first South Australian Railways vehicle to be so fitted) and kitchen refrigeration.

The interior had a central kitchen/servery area flanked by eight tables and seating for 46 sitting passengers.

When it first entered service, the vehicle was fitted with full-width concertina diaphragms and a full-depth diaphragm, and painted royal blue along the windowline; no colour photos of that scheme exist. Because of the concertinas the vehicle had to be marshalled next to steel carriages or V&SAR jointly-owned stock to prevent damage. Additionally, since the vehicle did not have doors to station platforms on either side, access was only available from adjacent vehicles, including stock deliveries for the kitchen staff. Externally the vehicle was left unpainted on the corrugated sections and with black undergear, but all other surfaces were a deep royal blue. Internally, the car was painted beige including the tables; the upholstery was brown. The tables were fitted with an aluminium strip around the edges, and the floor was a black and white chequered linoleum surface. The car's riding qualitiies were improved in 1953 when the first pair of Commonwealth bogies made by Bradford Kendall – a design that was eventually to become widespread on Australian railways – was fitted in a test program.

In the early 1960s the car was repainted with a dark green replacing the previous blue, to give the car something of an inverse version of the livery then applied to steel country lines cars. Subsequently, it was painted green with a cream band along the windows and a black roof.

The car caught fire in 1967 at Bowmans railway station, requiring a complete internal rebuild. As part of those works the full-width concertinas were removed from the ends and replaced with the regular style, and the car was repainted into the regal red and silver colour scheme applied to the Overland cars and the new AD and BD cars. In 1982 the vehicle was hired to Victoria to provide on-train catering as a temporary measure until enough of the new BRN and BRS buffet cars entered service; it was first observed as a regular vehicle on the Gippslander service to Sale. However, the car was found to have considerable rust in the frames, so the lease was cancelled and the car returned to Australian National in 1986.

In 1988 the cafeteria car was purchased by the Port Dock Station Museum (now the National Railway Museum, Port Adelaide), where it was restored. Since then it has been used for its original purpose on special events days and when hired by groups.

=== D type carriages ===
D type sitting cars
- Constructed: 1964-1965
- Number built: 9
- Fleet numbers: AD 1-5; ABD 1-3; BD 1-4; AG372-376; BG368-371
- Capacity: 70 passengers (68 in composite ABD cars)

Specifications
- Car length: 75 ft (22.86 m)
- Bogies: 53 ft (16.15 m) centres, with 8 ft (2.44 m) wheelbases each for a total wheelbase of 61 ft (18.59 m)

During the latter half of the Joint Stock series' construction, the South Australian Railways chose to build a handful of carriages to provide upgraded accommodation on the East-West Express from Adelaide to Port Pirie. Over the period 1964 to 1967 nine carriages and fourteen guard's vans were constructed at Islington Railway Workshops, using similar methods to those applied in the building of the 1947 prototype cafeteria car and the "Overland" Joint Stock fleet introduced from 1949.

The fleet initially consisted of six virtually identical cars – AD 1 and 2 for first class passengers and BD 1, 2, 3 and 4 for second class passengers – each with 70 seats arranged in a saloon format, and three composite cars – ABD 1, 2 and 3 – with 68 seats. The intention was to run the cars as two four-car sets with one composite vehicle on standby, providing capacity for 278 passengers. The only difference between the classes was in the colour of carpet and the quality of the upholstery, to save on construction costs. All seats were capable of rotating and reclining, as paired units either side of the central aisle. A full-height partition was constructed at the middle of the car to divide smoking and non-smoking sections, with the former having room for 36 passengers and the latter 34; in the case of the composite carriages, both halves would only seat 34, and neither saloon was allocated to smoking passengers.

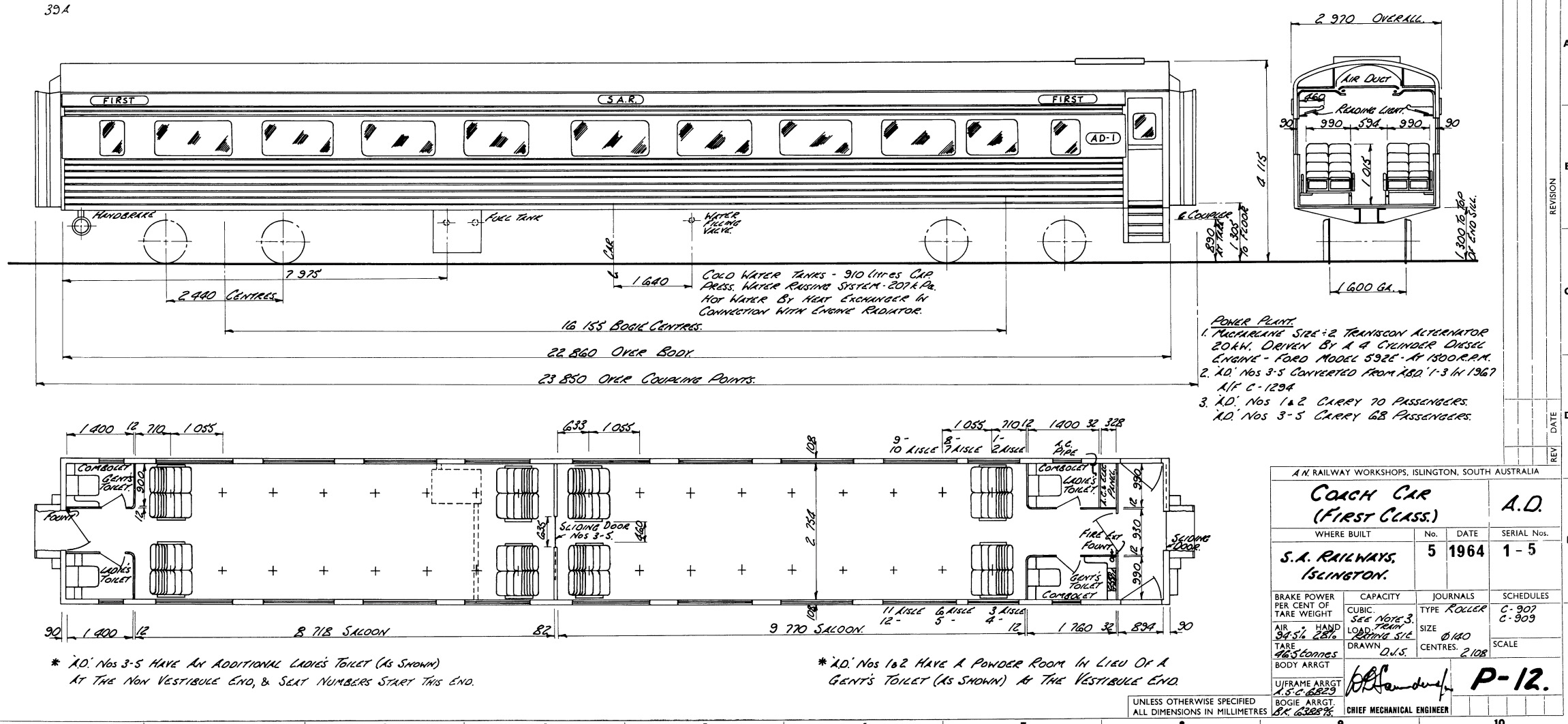
AD first class coach car

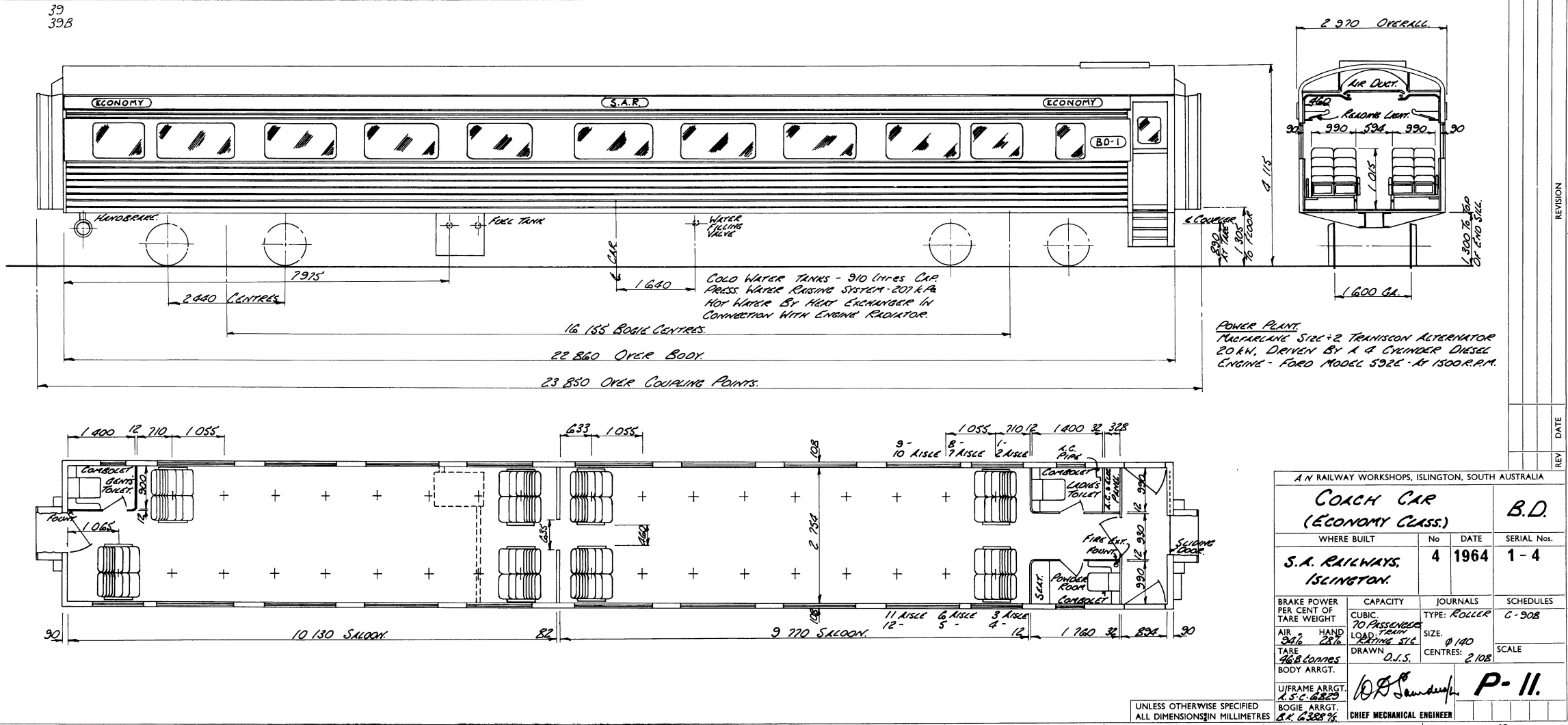
BD second class coach car

A full-width vestibule was provided at one end, separated from the non-smoking saloon (or second class saloon in the composite cars) by a swing door. The vestibule was fitted on both sides with two-part "stable" doors allowing train staff to lean out of the carriages if necessary. Steps enabling ground-level boarding had a flap that could be lowered if the train stopped at a platform.

In 1967, the three composite cars were converted to first class exclusively, and recoded from ABD 1–3 to AD 3-5 respectively. It is not clear whether this entailed increasing capacity from 68 to 70 passengers each.

Each car was powered individually by an underfloor auxiliary diesel engine, driving an AC alternator which would supply power for the air conditioning and lighting. When the cars were converted to standard gauge, that system was removed and the cars were instead fitted with standard 415vDC head-end power sockets.

About 1975, the entire fleet of sitting cars was altered to allow a future conversion to standard gauge, which occurred from 1982 when the line from Port Pirie to Adelaide was converted. The first few conversions retained their original classes, but in the mid-1980s they were changed to AG (first class) and BG (second class) to tie in better with the coding system of Australian National Railways. Cars AD 1-5 became AG 376–372 in descending order, and cars BD1-4 became BG370, 368, 369 and 371; though car 372 spent a few months as second class car BG372.

In the early 1990s the cars were fitted with showers, and the seating capacity was increased to 80 per car; the first class carriages were then fitted with external "Indian Pacific" name boards, and the second class carriages with "Ghan" nameboards. The Indian Pacific cars were repainted to plain silver and the Ghan cars similarly but with a gradient yellow-orange band fitted along the windowline. As part of the refurbishment, BG369 was recoded AG369 and included in the Indian Pacific group. In 1997 the entire fleet was sold to Great Southern Rail, and in 2002-2003 the cars were sold to a third party and leased back for operational purposes. Sometime after 2003, car AG369's seating was reduced to 48 passengers after a disabled toilet was fitted.

=== Brake vans ===
Brake vans (CD, SCD, AVCY & AVCP)
- In service: 1965-current
- Constructed: 1965-1967
- Number built: 14
- Fleet numbers: CD1-11, SCD1-3, AVCY/AVCP 1-9, 378-379, 388-392, OWR392, "RICE" and "TRACKS" car
- Capacity: 25 long tons (25.40 t)

Specifications
- Car length: 72 ft 3 in (22.02 m)
- Width: 9 ft 9 in (2.97 m)
- Height: 14 ft (4.27 m)
- Weight: 39 long tons (39.63 t) unloaded, 64 long tons (65.03 t) loaded.
- Bogies: 53 ft (16.15 m) centres, with 8 ft (2.44 m) wheelbases each for a total wheelbase of 61 ft (18.59 m)

From 1965, Islington Railway Workshops adapted the D class passenger car design to provide 14 large brake vans for non-metropolitan passenger trains. They were used initially between Adelaide and Port Pirie and on the Blue Lake train to Mount Gambier.

The vans are organised into a guard's compartment at one end, measuring 8 ft 9 in (2.67 m), followed by three baggage compartments of 23 ft 2.5 in (7.07 m), 20 ft 11.25 in (6.38 m) and 15 ft 2.5 in (4.64 m) and capacities of 10 long tons (10.16 t), 8 long tons (8.13 t) and 7 long tons (7.11 t) respectively. The centre compartment was designed with a partially removable floor to allow for fish to be stored under the car body and provide air-cooling while the train was in motion. The layout of the car allowed all goods compartments to be loaded at the same time. The initial quality of ride for the guard was less than in the later CO vans, which had a similar layout but with the guard's compartment between two of the three goods compartments.

The guard had a 47-gallon water tank under the floor to provide for the toilet and wash basin, and concertinas were provided at both ends of each car to ensure that staff were protected if passing between cars.

The final three vans, planned to be CD12, 13 and 14, were instead stored at Islington Railway Workshops on transfer bogies after they were completed in May 1967. They were held until January 1970, when they entered service as standard gauge vans SCD 1, 2 and 3 for local traffic between Port Pirie and Broken Hill. Van SCD3 was taken from that service on occasion and used as a replacement for one of the two CO vans on the Overland when they required maintenance.

All vans were included in the sale of the South Australian Railways fleet to Australian National Railways in 1975.

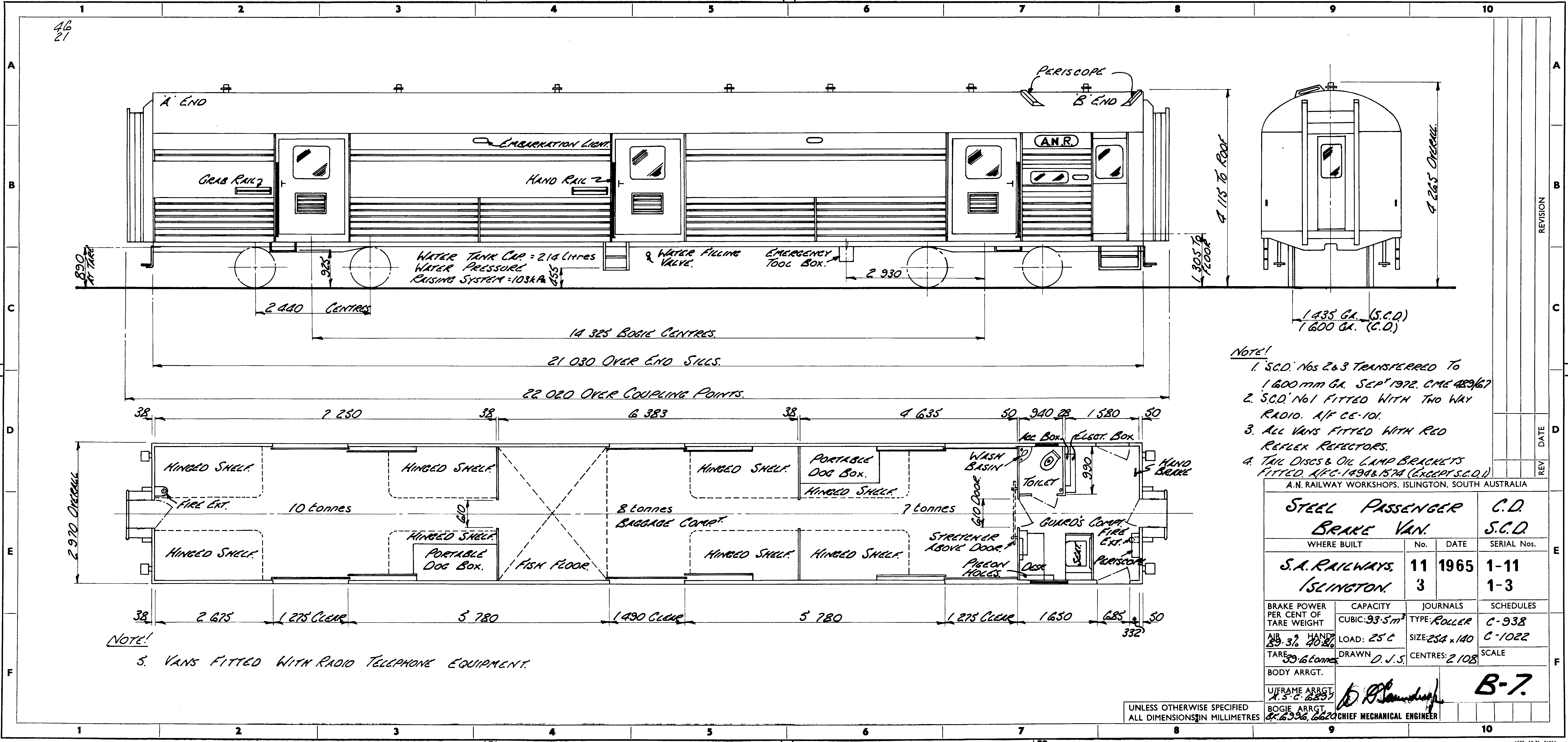
CD class brake van

==== Lease to Victoria ====
Prior to the introduction of all eight of VicRail (later V/Line)'s originally planned ACZ cars, four vans – CD1, 2, 3 and 7 – were leased to Victoria for use on country services in their state. These sets tended to operate on similar rosters to those of the Z type sets as they started to come into use, and the CD vans remained in Victoria until around 1988.

==== Post-V/Line use ====
In 1987, guards' vans were recoded to meet the new Railways of Australia identification standard, and the CD vans took on the new code AVCY for Australian National, Van, 3rd type, and high speed / fixed gauge. The program was followed up a few years later with a recoding to AVCP, marking the vans for passenger services, and vans 2, 3, 5, 6, 7, 8, 9, 378, 379, 389 and 391 were recoded as such. Overlapping with this program was the application of Australian National numbers, with van CD4 becoming AVCY389, 10 to 391 and 11 to 392, and SCD1 renumbered to 378 and 3 to 379. Other vans were allocated 300-series numbers but were scrapped before the new numbers could be applied.

From the mid-1980s the vans were needed less as fewer and longer trains were being operated and the railways were gradually leaving the small parcels business. Vans 4, 6, 8, 9, 10 and 11 were removed from normal service, refurbished and repainted with blue roofs and ends, and yellow and red stripes on the sides, and converted into a fixed consist called the Jubilee Trade Train. The train toured South Australia celebrating local industries over the 150 years since European settlement.

In 1991, van AVCY391 was pulled from the now stored Jubilee consist and converted to OWR392, for the RICE and TRACKS services: respectively, Remote and Isolated Children's Exercise, and Trans Australian Community Services. It was withdrawn after catching fire a few years later.

The entire fleet had been withdrawn by 1990, and in 1993 all but AVCP2 had been scrapped; the final vehicle followed in early 1994.
