= West Coast Line =

West Coast Line may refer to:

- KTM West Coast railway line, Malaysia
- West Coast Line (Sweden)
- West Coast Main Line, United Kingdom
- West Coastway Line, United Kingdom
- West Coast Line (Wessel, Duval & Company) shipping company
- The West Coast Railway in New Zealand, see Wellington–Manawatu Line
- Western Trunk line in Taiwan
- West Coast Line (Qingdao Metro)

== See also ==
- West Coast Railway (disambiguation)
