= West Coast Railway (Victoria) =

Defunct passenger train company in Victoria, Australia

- Industry: Public Transport
- Predecessor: V/Line
- Founded: 19 September 1993
- Defunct: 31 August 2004
- Successor: V/Line
- Headquarters: Geelong
- Owner: Don Gibson; Gary McDonald; Michael Menzies; Australian Public Trustees
- Website: www.wcr.com.au

West Coast Railway was a passenger train company operating in Victoria, Australia that operated services between Melbourne and Warrnambool from 19 September 1993 until 31 August 2004. The travel time for the journey (Warrnambool – Melbourne) was around 3 hours. This is on average around 30 minutes quicker than the current journeys.

== History ==
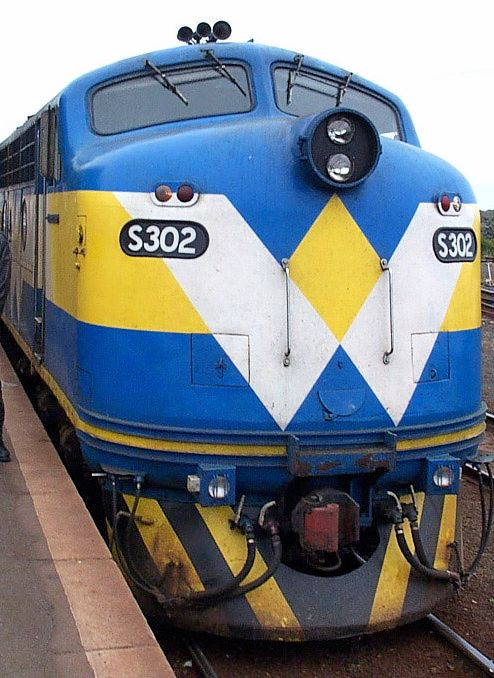
West Coast Railway's S302 at Warrnambool station in 2001

West Coast Railway was formed on 19 September 1993 when the Kennett State Government offered long-distance country rail services previously run by the government-owned operator V/Line to private operators. Bids were lodged in February 1993 and The Victorian Railway Company Pty Ltd, trading as West Coast Railway was announced as the successful tender on 30 April the same year. A trial period of a year, starting from 19 September 1993, was deemed successful with a seven-year contract signed the following September. Subsequently, a three-year extension was negotiated.

While most other rail services tendered were replaced by road coach services, West Coast Railway successfully tendered to retain a rail service. During the 11 years of WCR operation of the line, patronage increased by 20%. The first rail service under WCR operated on 19 September when V/Line locomotive N466 hauled the 17:00 Warrnambool to Melbourne Spencer Street service.

In August 2001, Connex purchased a 50% shareholding. Donald Gibson and Gary McDonald continued to hold the other 50% shareholding. In 2003, Connex sold its shareholding to Australian Public Trustees.

On 26 June 2001, the two directors of the company Gibson and McDonald bought a 50% share in Tranz Scenic, the national passenger operator in New Zealand, withdrawing some long-distance trains that were not profitable. In May 2004, the TranzScenic shareholding was sold back to Toll NZ.

== Rolling stock ==
A blue, white, yellow and grey livery was adopted, and was progressively applied to all West Coast Railway rolling stock.

West Coast Railway initially purchased ten B and S Class locomotives, former Southern Aurora dining car RMS2360, four CP and one VZDY former guard's vans, and eleven total D, VBCW and VLCX vans, for a total of 27 items of rolling stock.In mid-1994, four South Australian 700-class carriages were also purchased, with carriage 711 being the first to enter service. A five-year lease was also taken out on a portion of the Ballarat East workshops for maintenance works, which V/Line had ceased using in 1992. As of February 1995, three S Class and one B Class locomotives were in service, along with the four CP vans. It was expected at the time that the six D vans would be used for mobile storage, while the VLCX and VBCW vans would be used at and between Warrnambool and Ballarat East yards.

Rail Safety Accreditation was obtained circa 1995, at which point West Coast Railway was able to purchase the three, four-car Z sets that they had been leasing from V/Line and which were deemed surplus with delivery of the Sprinter railcars. These carriages were painted in the same scheme as the locomotives and vans then in service, using silicon alkyl gloss enamels formulated by Haymes Paints in Ballarat. Initial plans were for the company to lease a portion of Newport Workshops' West Block, but that later changed to daily cleaning and maintenance being based in Warrnambool, with heavy works being undertaken at Ballarat East. To provide the necessary facilities at Warrnambool, a shed was disassembled and removed from Spencer Street yards, transported to Warrnambool, and re-erected and extended to provide the necessary facilities.

As of early 1995, West Coast Railway had also won a tender let by the City of Greater Bendigo to restore steam locomotive R711, and was involved in projects related to diesel-electric locomotive T411 and steam locomotives J536 and Y112. To enable regular heritage operation, the water tower at Birregurra was confirmed to be still be serviceable, and another was relocated from Elmore to Ballarat East for reconditioning, after which it would be installed at Colac.

The first West Coast Railway train to operate out of the Ballarat East locomotive depot was for a commercial filmed at Lethbridge Quarry on 15 February 1995. This train used borrowed locomotive T413, West Coast Railway van CP292 and carriage BK711, and heritage cars from Steamrail Ballarat 32ABU-32AV-600ZD. Shortly thereafter, locomotives T363 and T369 were purchased from the Public Transport Corporation and delivered to Ballarat East on 1 March 1995.

After acquisition of the 12 carriages formed as three Z sets, seven additional carriages were purchased in June 1995 - BS201, BS206, BS208, BS210, BRS223, BRS229, and Overland sleeping carriage Nankuri. The BRS carriages were brought into service almost immediately to help cover for the four carriages still damaged following the Werribee derailment of 2 September 1995, though the four BS carriages required repairs before they could re-enter service.

=== Locomotives ===
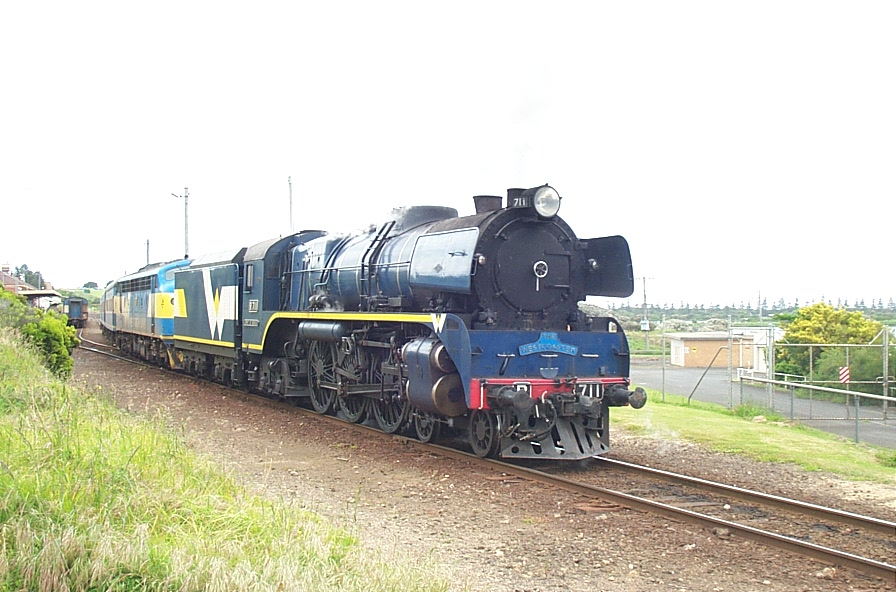
R711 leads a steam-hauled West Coast Railway service out of Warrnambool station, 2001

West Coast Railway operated rolling stock that was notable for being largely made up of 50-year-old locomotives including a steam locomotive, and some rolling stock bought from V/Line. They replaced the 1980s-built locomotives and rolling stock that had previously operated on the line, and contrasted with the successful tenderer for the Shepparton line rail service from Hoys Roadlines, which decided to lease rolling stock from V/Line.

The locomotives owned by West Coast Railway were:

Number	Image	Date Restored to Service	Notes	Current owner
B61		1995		Southern Shorthaul Railroad
B64		N/A	Never Restored to Service	Scrapped in May 2025
B65		2002	Used primarily for freight and transfers	Scrapped in June 2025
B75		N/A	Never Restored to Service	Southern Shorthaul Railroad
B76		1997		Southern Shorthaul Railroad
B80		2002	restored for failed South Australian Tourist Venture: The Murraylander	Southern Shorthaul Railroad
GM19		N/A	Never Restored to Service, and swapped for B75 around 2000	Railpower
S300		1995		Privately Owned
S302		1995		Previously owned by Southern Shorthaul Railroad; scrapped in June 2025
S311		1995		Southern Shourthaul Railroad
S312		N/A	Never restored to service	Southern Shorthaul Railroad
T363		1995	Used primarily for freight and transfers	Southern Shorthaul Railroad
T369		1999	Used primarily for freight and transfers	Watco Australia
T385		2000	Used primarily for freight and transfers	Southern Shorthaul Railroad
A²996		N/A	Steam, never restored to service	Port of Echuca
D³641		N/A	Steam, never restored to service	Steamrail Victoria
D³688		N/A	Steam, never restored to service	Steamrail Victoria
J536		N/A	Steam, never restored to service	707 Operations
R711		1998	Steam	City of Greater Bendigo
R766		2002	Steam	Hunter Valley Railway Trust
Y112		1997	Steam	Sovereign Hill

The first locomotive to be fully overhauled was S300, which began trials on 23 January 1995, entering regular service two weeks later. The railway workshop at Ballarat East was leased by the company as its heavy maintenance base, with transfer runs being made via the Geelong to Ballarat line.

Specially modified R class steam locomotives were used to operate a Saturday return service, becoming the fastest regular steam-hauled passenger service in the world. R711 entered service on regular trains on 21 November 1998 and was fitted with multiple unit control equipment so that it could be used in conjunction with diesel electric locomotives. It was followed by R766 in 2001.

The final locomotive painted out of the WCR corporate livery was T369 in 2008.

=== Passenger carriages ===
The carriages purchased and operated by West Coast Railway were primarily S and Z-type steel-bodied passenger carriages built between 1937 and 1959.

Number	Image	Date restored to service	Class	Notes
BK700			Excursion	with Steamrail as of August 2025
BK709			Excursion	Kept as a source of spare parts. Scrapped May 2011
BK711			Excursion	Fire Damaged in 2015. Stored with Steamrail as of August 2025
BK714			Excursion	At Tailem Bend as of August 2025
BS201			Economy	Recoded 11 AS following acquisition by Steamrail. Currently with Steamrail as of August 2025
BS203			Economy	Recoded 10 AS following acquisition by Steamrail. Currently with Steamrail as of August 2025
BS205			Economy	With 707 Operations as of August 2025
BS206			Economy	Recoded 8 AS following acquisition by Steamrail. Currently with Steamrail as of August 2025
BS207			Economy	Recoded 5 AS following acquisition by Steamrail. Currently with Steamrail as of August 2025
BS208			Economy	Now a crew car with Aurizon (QCBY8R) as of August 2025
BS210			Economy	Now a crew car with Aurizon (QCBY10W) as of August 2025
BS212			Economy	With 707 Operations as of August 2025
BRS221			Buffet	Now a crew car with Pacific National as of August 2025
BRS222			Buffet	Now a crew car with Pacific National as of August 2025
BRS223			Buffet	Now a crew car with Pacific National as of August 2025
BRS224			Buffet	Now with 707 Operations as of August 2025
BRS225			Buffet	Now a crew car with Pacific National as of August 2025
BRS229			Buffet	Recoded 9 BRS following acquisition by Steamrail. Currently with Steamrail as of August 2025
ACZ252			First	Refurbished, now BZN252 with V/Line as of September 2024
ACZ255			First	Now with 707 Operations as of September 2024
ACZ257			First	Recoded BCZ257 with V/Line. Now with 707 Operations as of September 2024
BZ267			Economy	Refurbished, now BZN267 with V/Line as of September 2024
BZ269			Economy	Now with Steamrail as of September 2024
BZ270			Economy	Now with 707 Operations as of September 2024
RMS2360		10 July 1999	Dining car	Now with Journey Beyond as of October 2026

=== Auxiliary stock ===
In addition to this, West Coast Railway purchased several luggage and power vans for use in their services:

Number	Image	Date restored to service	Notes	Current owner
D309			Never repainted away from V/Line orange livery.	
D314				
D315				
D319			One door replaced when head end power generator set was fitted. Now with Seymour Railway Heritage Centre as of August 2025.	
D325			Never repainted away from V/Line orange livery.	
D333			Never repainted away from V/Line orange livery.	
2PCO			Recoded PCJ493 with V/Line, now with 707 Operations as of August 2025	
CP291			Recoded 34 CP following acquisition by Steamrail. Now with Steamrail as of August 2025	
CP293			Damaged in the Werribee derailment in 1995. Now located at the Casterton Rotary Club as of October 2026	
PCP292			Now with Steamrail as of August 2025	
PCP294			Now with 707 Operations as of August 2025	

== Services other than Warrnambool ==
As well as operating regular Warrnambool passenger services, West Coast Railway also ran charter services and operated special excursion trains to various destinations within Victoria, often in conjunction with The South Western Railway Society. The company assisted with the restoration of a number of steam locomotives. R711 and Y112 were made operational, and work was carried out on J536, D3 638, D3 641, and A2 986.

The company also took advantage of Victoria's newly privatised rail freight market by hiring its T class locomotives to freight operators, as well as its mainline fleet of B class and S class on occasions.

== Demise ==
West Coast Railway encountered a series of operational difficulties during 2003/04 which adversely affected its business. The death of one of the company's founding principals, Gary McDonald, on 25 April 2003 removed the guiding light and spirit of the company. The closure of the Warrnambool line between Melbourne and Geelong for five weeks in January and February 2004, to allow its rebuilding as part of the 160 km/h (100 mph) Regional Fast Rail project, meant that the company had to replace rail services with road coaches during the period of the works, with a resulting drop in passenger numbers.

In May 2004 (two months after rail services had resumed), the Victorian Department of Infrastructure issued an alert on stress cracks on the underframes of the B class and S class locomotives, including the units owned by West Coast Railway. Once again the company was forced to replace two of its three daily-return rail services with road coaches. The company intended at the time to repair four of the seven engines on their roster, but chose not to use T Class locomotives to operate their trains in the meantime due to the lower power and maximum speeds.

There had also been a change in government transport policy following the election of the Bracks State Government. In light of the failure of privatisation of V/Line Passenger, then Opposition transport spokesman Geoff Leigh predicting the proposed re-tendering of statewide regional rail operations in 2006 would result in West Coast Railway being "executed".

Although West Coast Railway stated as late as May 2004 its intention to negotiate a new contract to operate Warrnambool services beyond the expiry of its existing contract in June 2004, with the expected locomotive repair bill to be in excess of $1 million, by early June the company had decided to not renew the operating contract.

As late as 9 June 2004, West Coast Railway was still expected to be involved in the restoration of steam locomotives A^{2}996 and Y112.

=== V/Line takeover of services ===
On 31 August 2004, West Coast Railway operated its final service (using leased V/Line locomotive N475)., with V/Line resuming services the following day.

The operating staff of West Coast Railways were offered jobs by V/Line, and the service frequency was kept. At the time of the announcement a number of West Coast Railway carriages were held at Newport Workshops so that V/Line could consider whether or not to purchase them. However, the weekday 12:40 from Spencer Street and 17:45 from Warrnambool were initially replaced with coaches due to insufficient V/Line rolling stock; these services were not restored until Friday 10 September 2004. The morning train from Melbourne was generally worked by an N Class locomotive, the midday trip by S302 (when available) and the afternoon train by an A class locomotive. V/Line platform signage replaced that of West Coast Railway between Winchelsea and Warrnambool in October 2004. Camperdown and Colac were given upgraded passenger and staff facilities across October to December.

From 1 September 2004, EDI Rail took over operation of the West Coast Railway depot at Ballarat East.

=== Locomotive disposals ===
==== CFCLA (B, S and T Class engines) ====
Nine diesel locomotives (B61, B65, B76, B80, S300, S11, T363, T369 and T385) and a range of spare parts were sold to Chicago Freight Car Leasing Australia. These engines joined CFCLA's ex-Great Northern Rail Services fleet of S317, T373, T376, T377 and T381, as well as T387 which was swapped for some Redhen railcars.

==== V/Line Passenger (S302) ====
Engine S302 had been withdrawn from service by West Coast Railway in September 2002 and held at Ballarat East depot due to poor body and frame condition. Around mid-2004 it was transferred to Newport Workshops for heavy maintenance including underframe repairs and a new bogie bolster. It was outshopped in mid July 2004 and transferred to Ballarat East on 27 August for further repairs including electrical systems changes and fitting of a refurbished engine, believed to have been a 645E model rather than the original 567C. Its first run in V/Line Passenger service was on 1 September 2004, working the 8:48 am to Warrnambool and returning on the 12:25 to Melbourne, but rough riding was reported and further adjustments were required. As such the engine was returned to Newport Workshops the following day, re-entering service on Tuesday 7 September and working a return trip on 9 September, passing the test for future use. The engine had been partially stripped of West Coast branding at this time, with lettering removed from the car-body and an altered logo on the nose. One such sighting of the engine in V/Line Passenger service was on 16 September 2004, with the engine in light blue, then dark blue V/Line power van PH453, followed by carriage set N4 painted in the V/Line corporate scheme. It was repainted to V/Line's colour scheme when it emerged from Newport Workshops on 23 December 2004.

==== Other Diesels ====
Diesel locomotive B64 was sold to a private buyer and remained in storage at Ballarat East workshops. It would later be sold to El Zorro and moved to Avteq in Sunshine North, later shifting to South Dynon. Its remains were scrapped in May 2025. S312 and GM19 went to a locomotive restoration group based in Goulburn.

==== Steam engines ====
R711 was allocated by Bendigo City Council to Steamrail Victoria, and R766's private owners similarly allocated their engine to Steamrail. Negotiations were made between a heritage operator and the Colac Otway Shire Council for the custody of J536. One of the tender bodies from the S class steam locomotives had been stored at Ballarat East; it was donated to the Australian Railway Historical Society and moved to Newport Workshops in August 2004.

=== Carriage and van disposals ===
Other rollingstock was disposed of thus:

- V/Line Passenger purchased ACZ252, ACZ257 and BZ267.
- 707 Operations purchased ACZ255, BZ270, BRS224, BS205 and BS212
- Steamrail Victoria purchased B64, BRS 229, BS201, BS206, BS207, BZ269
- Pacific National purchased BRS221, BRS222, BRS223 and BRS225 for use as crew cars

Additionally, a range of auxiliary rolling stock was sold at auction in March 2004. Bids closed on 2 April 2004. Much of this rolling stock had been located at Ballarat East, either used as parts storage or held for future restoration.

A second sale was undertaken with bids closing on 7 July 2004 for items not sold at the first auction, alongside some items that had been used in traffic until May 2004 when the West Coast Railway locomotives were withdrawn\; items from either category in the second sale are marked below with "§".

CFCLA locomotives T373-T377 hauled eleven sold carriages from Warrnambool at 1:30pm on 29 August 2004, the consist from east end being BRS221 (sold privately), BK714-BK711-BK700-BS207-BS212-PCP292 (sold to Steamrail Victoria), and ACZ255-BS205-PCP294-BRS222 (sold to 707 Operations.

Carriages newly owned by V/Line were sighted in a group, PCO2-ACZ257-BZ267-BS215 (the latter not ex West Coast), in a consist on Thursday 11 November 2004. BZ267 had been repainted V/Line Passenger red but retained its West Coast era interior, though with rotating seats disabled and the seats generally set as facing pairs. At this time the two ACZ cars, 252 and 257, remained painted blue. By May 2005 Steamrail had repainted BRS229 as 9BRS in a red and yellow livery, with modifications made to the buffet compartment to provide additional storage.

On 16 May 2005 BRS225 departed Warrnambool on a freight train worked by A78, leaving only BRS224 remaining. BRS222 and BRS223 had already proceeded to the Bendigo SSR workshops via Tottenham Yard for conversion to crew cars; By the end of May 2005 all four BRS cars, 221, 222, 223 and 225, were owned by a pair of former West Coast Railway drivers who intended to lease them as crew cars to Pacific National, so the former buffet modules extracted and dumped, and externally the cars were repainted to a blue livery with yellow ends. BRS225 was the first to re-enter service, running its first trip as a crew car on Sunday 4 September working on standard gauge behind an NR-AN-NR combination. It is not clear when, or if, these four cars were purchased by Pacific National directly.

Type	Vehicle No	Vehicle Type	Bogie notes	Condition	Outcome
Locomotive	B 64 §	Diesel electric locomative	On temporary bogies, road bogies available	Incomplete, used as spares	To Steamrail Victoria
Locomotive	GM 19	Diesel electric locomotive	On transfer bogies; road bogies included		To Goulburn, NSW
Locomotive	S 312	Diesel electric locomotive		Complete	To Goulburn, NSW
Carriage	AE 39	Underframe & bogies		No body or undergear	
Carriage	BK 700	Non-air conditioned carriage		Roadworthy	To Steamrail Victoria
Carriage	BK 711	Non-air conditioned carriage		Roadworthy	To Steamrail Victoria
Carriage	BK 714	Non-air conditioned carriage		Roadworthy	To Steamrail Victoria
Carriage	BRB 89	Wegmann second class sleeping carriage		Poor condition	Sold and moved to South Geelong.
Carriage	BRS 223	Steel bodied passenger carriage, with catering module	VHP505 & VHP506		
Carriage	BS 203	Steel bodied passenger carriage		Bogies fitted, body damaged one end - ex Werribee incident	Sold privately, stored at South Geelong. Almost every window was broken.
Carriage	BS 208	Steel bodied passenger carriage	On unmodified Harris Motor bogies	Parts stripped	
Carriage	BS 210	Steel bodied passenger carriage	VHP 497 & VHP 498	Parts stripped	
Carriage	ACZ 255 §	Steel bodied passenger carriage			To 707 Operations
Carriage	BRS 221 §	Steel bodied passenger carriage			Converted to crew car for Pacific National
Carriage	BRS 222 §	Steel bodied passenger carriage			Converted to crew car for Pacific National
Carriage	BRS 224 §	Steel bodied passenger carriage			Converted to crew car for Pacific National
Carriage	BRS 225 §	Steel bodied passenger carriage			Converted to crew car for Pacific National
Carriage	BRS 229 §	Steel bodied passenger carriage			To Steamrail Victoria as 9BRS
Carriage	BS 201 §	Steel bodied passenger carriage			To Steamrail Victoria
Carriage	BS 205 §	Steel bodied passenger carriage			To 707 Operations
Carriage	BS 206 §	Steel bodied passenger carriage			To Steamrail Victoria
Carriage	BS 207 §	Steel bodied passenger carriage			To Steamrail Victoria
Carriage	BS 212 §	Steel bodied passenger carriage			To 707 Operations
Carriage	BZ 269 §	Steel bodied passenger carriage			To Steamrail Victoria, now lounge car
Carriage	BZ 270 §	Steel bodied passenger carriage			To 707 Operations
Carriage	JRA 1 §	Overland Roomlette MURURI	WCO1 & WCO2		
Carriage	JRA 3H §	Overland Roomette carriage NANKURI	Harris trailer bogies	No brakes	Sold privately, stored at South Geelong. Poor exterior condition.
Carriage	JRA 4 Q §	Overland Roomette PURPAWI	Harris bogies, no brake gear	Incomplete	
Carriage	JTA 1	Overland Twinette NOMULDI	WCO 3 & WCO 4?		
Carriage	JTA 3 §	Overland Twinette MALKARI	WCO 3 & WCO 4?		
Carriage	TAMBO	Wooden bodied passenger carriage, with 6-wheel bogies		Poor condition, one compartment removed	Privately restored in format of Parlor cars Yarra and Murray, now on Victorian Goldfields Railway
Carriage	WAL 951	ex-Westrail Commissioners car, SG bogies available	WCO 7 & WCO 8		Sold privately in May 2004, proceeded to Seymour Railway Heritage Centre.
Other			2 No Pullman 6 wheel bogies	Pullman PB boxes, from Port Augusta	
Van	AVDP 393L §	Crew car	On temporary (Harris Trailer) bogies, SG bogies available (less one wheelset)		Sold to Australian Train Movers, then to private property in Cowra in September 2004.
Van	CO 2	Overland luggage van	On Overland bogies owned by M Menzies		Sold privately, stored at South Geelong. Good condition.
Van	CP 293	Luggage Van - damaged at Werribee in 1995	VPB 1110 & VBP 1109	incomplete, used as spares	Sold to Casterton Rotary Club, arrived 25 July 2004, for use as part of a historic railway display at the former goods shed.
Van	VZDY 27 (Note: Notably, VZDY 52 is not present on any sale list, despite it having been painted West Coast blue after Great Northern ceased operations.)	Guards Van	VPB 1252 & 1253, good wheels		
Wagon	AMRP 262 S §	Car carrier wagon	ABDA 3 & ABDA 4		Remained in Ballarat goods yard for over a decade.
Wagon	D 309 §	Bogie Box Van	VXC 2791 & VXC 3468		
Wagon	D 325 §	Bogie Box Van	VP1232, other unnumbered	Orange, poor condition	
Wagon	D 333 §	Bogie Box Van	VPB 1265 & VPB 1266		
Wagon	DT 314 §	Bogie Box Van	VPB 1074 & VPB 1039	WCR colours	
Wagon	DT 315	Bogie Box Van	BX bogies, unnumbered	WCR colours	
Wagon	DT 319 §	Bogie Box Van, fitted with small diesel alternator		WCR colours	
Wagon	PCP292 §	Steel bodied van equipped with 250 kW (340 hp) diesel alternator and two luggage compartments.			
Wagon	PCP294 §	Steel bodied van equipped with 250 kW (340 hp) diesel alternator and two luggage compartments.		WCR colours	
Wagon	DW 234	4-wheel open wagon fitted with 1,500 imperial gallons (6,800 L) tank		11 in × 5.5 in (280 mm × 140 mm) PB axles	Remained at Ballarat East through 2010; sighted at the Yarra Valley Tourist Railway in 2016 and 2019.
Wagon	GY 97	4-wheel open wagon		10 in × 5 in (250 mm × 130 mm) CS axle boxes	Has J536 loco cab in it
Wagon	G 677 D §	4-wheel open wagon		Poor condition, at Camperdown	
Wagon	G 800 R § (Note: Three sources - Comrails, Newsrail May 2004 and September 2004 - list this as wagon I 800 R, but that fails a check letter test. Additionally, many of the other G/GY wagons listed in this table appear in the same photo sequence as G 800 R at Tottenham in May 1997.)	4-wheel open wagon		Poor condition, at Camperdown	
Wagon	GY 2855 D	4-wheel open wagon		10 in × 5 in (250 mm × 130 mm) CS axle boxes	Complete
Wagon	GY 2934 X	4-wheel open wagon		Has 10x5 axle boxes	
Wagon	GY 4595 D §	4-wheel open wagon		Poor condition, at Camperdown	
Wagon	GY 4622 T §	4-wheel open wagon		Poor condition, at Camperdown	
Wagon	GY 5802 A §	4-wheel open wagon		Poor condition, at Camperdown	
Wagon	GY 16678	4-wheel open wagon		10 in × 5 in (250 mm × 130 mm) CS axle boxes	Loaded and tarped.
Wagon	VBCW 37 §	80 ft (24 m) Ford Van	Low level aligned bogies VWC 601 & VWC 602	Good	
Wagon	VBCW 38 §	80 ft (24 m)	Low level aligned bogies VWC 0060 & VWC 0659	Good	
Wagon	VLCX 604 W (Note: VLCX 212 H and VLCX 534 Q may have been disposed of separately.)	Louvre Wagon	XC 11160 & XC 11287	WCR colours, poor condition	
Wagon	VTQF 196 P	Oil Tank Wagon	VXC 2188 & VXC ??61		
Wagon	VTSA 572 C	Bogie Loco Fuel Tank Wagon	ABXC 1017 & XC 11003		
Wagon	VTSA 573	Bogie Loco Fuel Tank Wagon	XC 11301 & XC 11754		

== Steamrail Westcoaster ==
Beginning in 2018, the heritage rail tour company Steamrail Victoria introduced a new tour named the "Warrnambool Westcoaster" to Warrnambool as a special homage to the former regular steam services of West Coast Railway. The tour was hauled by ex-West Coast engine R711, which was allocated to Steamrail in 2004 and re-entered service in 2011. Originally operated as a charter for local resident and Steamrail volunteer Edward White, the tour was deemed extremely popular, becoming part of Steamrail's range of day tours from 2019 with heritage diesel S313 assisting.
