= Victorian Railways Z type carriage =

Class of Australian passenger cars

Z type carriage
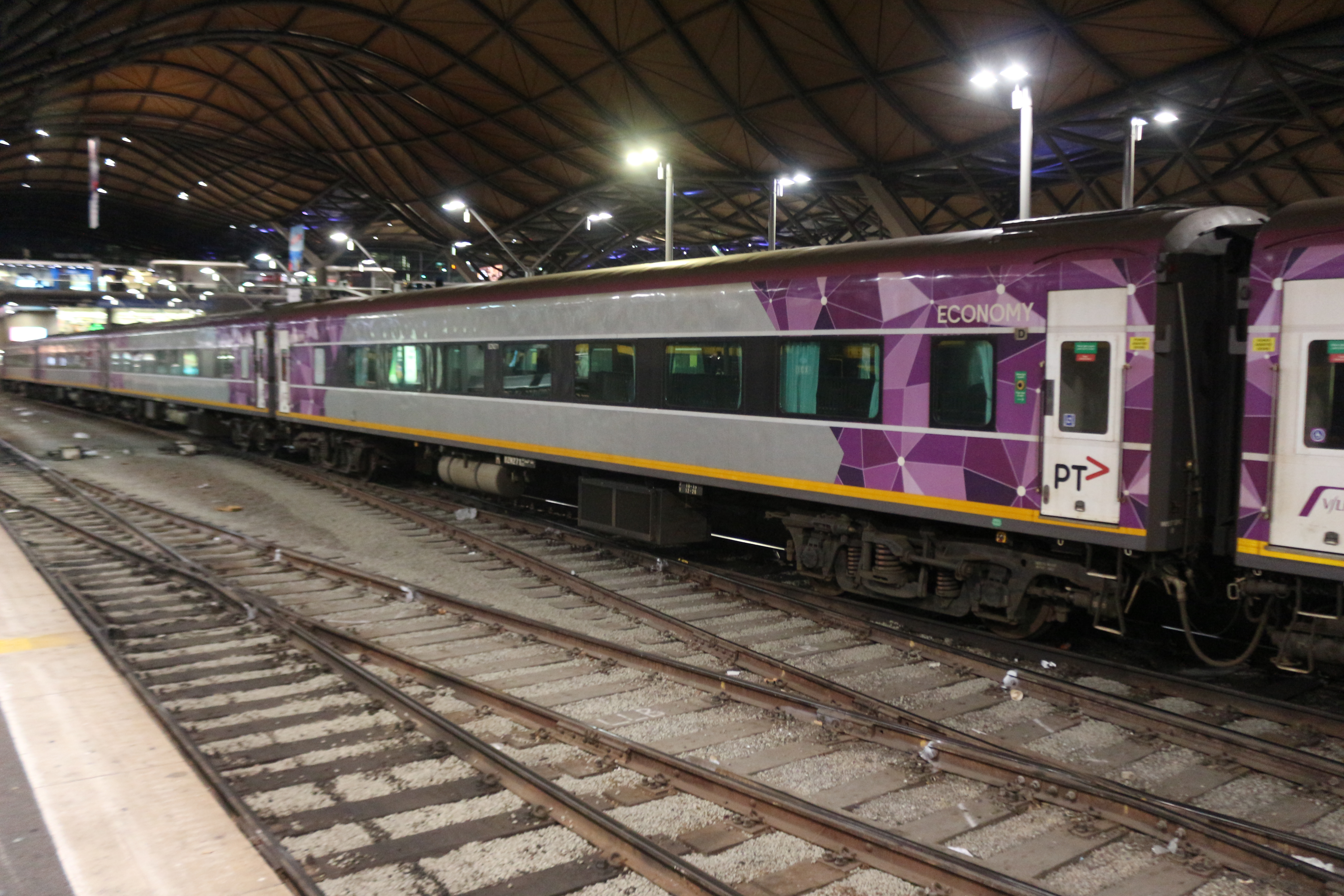
- Carriage BZN271

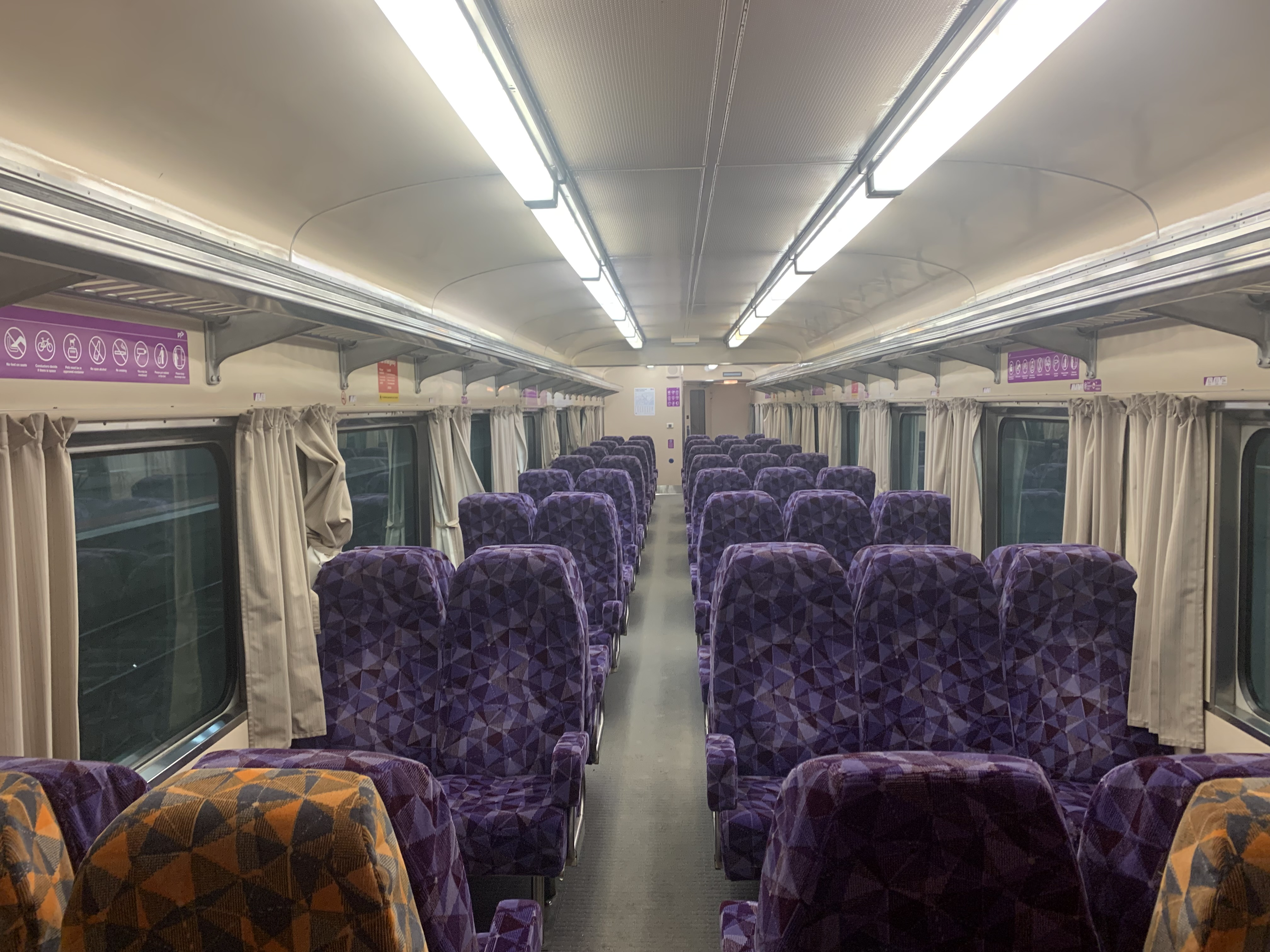
- Refurbished Interior
- In service: 1957–2006 (As Z sets), now used with N sets to provide additional capacity.
- Manufacturer: Victorian Railways
- Built at: Newport Workshops
- Constructed: 1956–1963
- Entered service: 1956
- Refurbished: 1983–1995 (conversions to ACZ and general reconditioning); 1998–2013 refurbished to BZN/BTN style carriages; refurbished again from 2008–2016.
- Number built: 27
- Number in service: 8
- Number preserved: 15
- Formation: Additional cars for N sets
- Operators: V/Line, various heritage operators

Specifications
- Car body construction: Steel
- Car length: 71 ft 6 in (21.79 m) over body, 74 ft 8 in (22.76 m) over coupling points (Sitting cars); 75 ft (22.86 m) over body, 78 ft 2 in (23.83 m) over coupling points (VAM1/SZ287)
- Width: 9 ft 9 in (2.97 m), 10 ft 1 15/16 in (3.10 m) over handrails (AZ, ACZ, BCZ, BZ, BZS, BZN & BTN), 10 ft 5/8 in (3.06 m) over handrails (VBK & VFK)
- Height: 13 ft 2 11/16 in (4.03 m) (AZ, ACZ, BCZ, BZ, BZS, BZN & BTN), 13 ft 4 5/8 in (4.08 m) (VBK & VFK)
- Doors: Manual swing, 2 per side, since upgraded to power-closing
- Articulated sections: Rubber corridor connectors
- Maximum speed: 70 mph (113 km/h)
- Power supply: Originally axle-mounted generators, now head-end power
- Coupling system: Autocouplers
- Track gauge: 5 ft 3 in (1,600 mm), has operated on 4 ft 8 1/2 in (1,435 mm) standard gauge

The Z type carriages are an air conditioned steel passenger carriage used on the railways of Victoria, Australia. The carriages were constructed by the Victorian Railways from 1956 for use on interstate services.

Two major types of carriage were constructed – thirteen AZ first class cars with closely spaced but smaller windows, and twelve BZ second class cars with wider spaced but larger windows (the thirteenth BZ entered service on standard gauge). Carriages were provided with a saloon layout, with 2+2 reversible seating provided, with each row lining up with the windows. First class was provided with more legroom than second. An internal partition existed between the two ends of the saloon, but was removed in later years. A single twinette sleeping car was also built in a Z type body shell, entering service in 1963; it had 20 berths.

A number of carriages were placed onto standard gauge bogies from 1962 for use on interstate trains such as the Spirit of Progress. With the end of these trains in the 1980s they were placed back onto the broad gauge. During this time a number of AZ type carriages were provided with conductors work stations / compartments and recoded to ACZ at this time.

The Z type cars were made redundant by the early 1990s with the introduction of the Sprinter railcars, most Z Sets were broken up, with the formation of West Coast Railway effective Sunday 19 September 1993 to run Melbourne ~ Geelong ~ Warrnambool Passenger Rail Services under contract to the Victorian Governments Dept. of Transport, Carriages: ACZ's: 252, 255, 257 & BZ's: 267, 269, 270 were obtained by West Coast Railway. After the demise of WCR, V/Line reacquired ACZ 252, ACZ 257 & BZ267, with preservation groups such as 707 Operations acquiring ACZ 255 & BZ 270 & Steamrail Victoria acquiring BZ 269.

The cars still with V/Line were refurbished from 1995, being provided with 2+3 seating in the N type carriage style, with some carriages also receiving wider doors and toilets with wheelchair access. Today only a handful of Z type carriages remain in unaltered form, these being ACZ255 & BZ270 with 707 Operations.

V/Line maintained ACZ 257 (now reclassed as BCZ 257 ~ an economy class carriage, with the WCR 2001-era upgraded conductors work station / compartment) now reversed to be at the West End, while still maintaining its Z type interior as modified & refurbished by WCR in their DDA-compliance upgrade of 2001. It was passed on to 707 Operations in May 2023 as part of general retirements of V/Line's locomotive-hauled fleet.

(As part of these upgrades for DDA-Complience by WCR: ACZ's 252 & 257 were permanently turned, with the old east end {that once formerly housed the 1980s-era fitted larger conductors work station / compartments} being subsequently removed & replaced with a DDA-complement disabled toilet, similar to that fitted to V/Line BZN Carriages, this was hence renamed the new west end of the carriage. The old west end, that once housed the former toilet and washroom compartments divided by the central aisle & saloon entry} was subsequently removed & replaced with a new smaller conductors work station/compartment and hence renamed the new east end of the carriage.)

The remaining Z type carriages in the V/Line fleet were temporarily removed from service in January 2013 due to cracking occurring in the bogies. The carriages have gradually been returned to service, and as at mid December 2016, only BTN253, BTN254, BZN258, BZN262 and BTN268 were out of service. These were all later reintroduced to service after their bogies were repaired.

== Services ==
From the introduction of the New Deal in 1981, Z cars largely operated as part of Z sets, however, in the early 1990s most sets were broken up, with carriages merged into N sets. They thus currently run on services mixed with Z sets. Until 2010, there was one set still branded as a Z set, set SZ7, however, this set was actually mostly made up of S cars.

The Z type cars currently run on long-distance services to Swan Hill. In the past, they also operated on other long-distance services, as well as interurban runs.

With the introduction of more VLocity trains, the Z cars have been withdrawn from all remaining services, except for Swan Hill, where it is unknown when locomotive-hauled trains will be replaced.

== Design ==
The new carriages were essentially a saloon version of the earlier S-car design, using the most modern amendments to that plan and adjusted for a saloon interior rather than compartments. Each carriage has a body length of 71 ft 6 in (21.79 m), with diaphragms either end extending to 75 ft (23 m) when loose, compressing by 2 in (51 mm) per end when coupled. The shell is 13 ft 2 11/16 in (4.031 m) from rail height when loaded, and 9 ft 9 in (2.97 m) wide plus external handrails. Couplers are 2 ft 11 in (0.89 m) above rail height on flat track, and the bogies are spaced at 53 ft (640 in) centres, and 9 ft 3 in (2.82 m) from the ends of the body. Axles are spaced 8 ft (2.4 m) apart within the bogies, and the wheels are 3 ft 0 1/2 in (0.927 m) diameter.

The first S and O/J type carriages were designed with full-width diaphragms in mind, using steel plates to give the impression of a single-unit train. 1AZ had curved ends reminiscent of this outline, while 2AZ, 1BZ and 2BZ had flat ends. The remainder of the class was built with chamfered edges to the body, and all units had exposed rubber diaphragms fitted from new. The walkway through the diaphragms is 2 ft 4 in (0.71 m) wide. Externally the only difference between the first and second class carriages, other than markings indicating as such, was the number and size of windows. Both types had two small windows, one either end per side, for the washroom and toilet. Between those, first class cars had a set of five then a set of seven short windows, while second class cars have three then five longer windows; the gap between window 3 and window 4 is hardly noticeable compared to the gap between 5 and 6 on the first class carriages.

Additionally, the first three vehicles of each class featured a line of rivets along the carriage frame. These are thought to be present because those carriage frames had originally been earmarked for future S type carriage builds.

=== Plumbing ===
The earlier cars in each set had a single tank for 140 gallons of cold water, and small air-intake panels either side of the end-of-carriage diaphragms. Later cars had two, much larger air intakes on one side only of each diaphragm, and tanks for 280 gallons of cold water; and in some cases an additional tank for 20 gallons of hot water.

=== Electrical Systems ===
All the broad gauge cars except AZ2, BZ1 and BZ2 were powered via Hypoid motor-generator sets, with a gear ratio of 3.47:1 generating 17 kW. The remaining three cars used an alternative system with a 2:57 gear ratio, driving a separate generator set to provide the same 17 kW. The standard gauge cars were only powered by an external supply of 3-phase 415 VAC at 50 Hz. When AZ3 and BZ3 operated on standard gauge they could be powered by their Hypoid systems, or if that was disconnected they could also use the head-end power of the train consist. Some cars were fitted with batteries for emergency power supply – 1VBK and 2VBK had 120 V batteries each, and 1VAM had a bank of batteries providing 48 V.

Air conditioning was built into the roof of the cars, with fresh air ducts either end of the cars and the distribution ducting formed by the ceiling design. Each car was also fitted with a heating system; between the air and in-floor heaters the total load was between 9000 to 10,500W depending on the car.

== Details ==
=== Sitting cars AZ, BZ & BZS, VBK & VFK ===
AZ, VBK
- Manufacturer: Victorian Railways
- Built at: Newport Workshops
- Family name: Z type
- Constructed: 1956–1959
- Number built: 13
- Fleet numbers: 1-13AZ, later 263AZ; 1–5, later 259–261 & 263VBK (4VBK went straight to ACZ262).
- Capacity: 48 1st class passengers, increased to 56 between 1966–1970.
- Operator: Victorian Railways

Specifications
- Car body construction: Steel
- Car length: 71 ft 6 in (21.79 m) over body, 74 ft 8 in (22.76 m) over coupling points
- Width: 9 ft 9 in (2.97 m), 10 ft 1 15/16 in (3.10 m) over handrails (AZ), 10 ft 5/8 in (3.06 m) over handrails (VBK)
- Height: 13 ft 2 11/16 in (4.03 m) (AZ), 13 ft 4 5/8 in (4.08 m) (VBK)
- Weight: 48 LT 14 cwt 0 qtr (49.48 t) (AZ), 43 LT 9 cwt 0 qtr (44.15 t) (VBK)
- Power supply: Axle-mounted generators (AZ); head-end power (VBK)
- Bogies: 53 ft (16.15 m) centres
- Braking system: Westinghouse
- Coupling system: Autocouplers
- Track gauge: 5 ft 3 in (1,600 mm) & 4 ft 8 1/2 in (1,435 mm)

BZ, VFK, BZS
- Manufacturer: Victorian Railways
- Built at: Newport Workshops
- Family name: Z type
- Constructed: 1957–1960
- Number built: 13
- Number preserved: 4
- Fleet numbers: 1-12BZ, 1-6VFK, 271-276VFK, 271-276BZS
- Capacity: 64 2nd class passengers, later 68 (BZ only, not VFK or BZS)
- Operator: Victorian Railways

Specifications
- Car body construction: 71 ft 6 in (21.79 m)
- Car length: 74 ft 8 in (22.76 m)
- Width: 9 ft 9 in (2.97 m), 10 ft 1 15/16 in (3.10 m) over handrails (BZ & BZS), 10 ft 5/8 in (3.06 m) over handrails (VFK)
- Height: 13 ft 2 11/16 in (4.03 m) (BZ & BZS), 13 ft 4 5/8 in (4.08 m) (VFK)
- Weight: 48 LT 15 cwt 0 qtr (49.53 t) (BZ & BZS), 43 LT 19 cwt 0 qtr (44.66 t) (VFK)
- Power supply: Axle-mounted generators (BZ); head-end power (VFK & BZS)
- Bogies: 53 ft (16.15 m) centres
- Braking system: Westinghouse
- Coupling system: Autocouplers
- Track gauge: 5 ft 3 in (1,600 mm) & 4 ft 8 1/2 in (1,435 mm)

When entering the carriage from a platform, passengers first walk through the vestibule area with swing doors to adjacent carriages through diaphragms. On the opposite side there are three doors; facing the centre of the carriage, the left is for the washroom, the centre to the saloon area and the right to the toilet. The men's washroom includes a power outlet supplying 230vAC. The main saloon compartment was originally divided into two sections, with a partition between. The end adjacent to the men's toilets was for smoking passengers and called the No. 1 End, while the end adjacent to the ladies' toilet was for non-smoking passengers and called the No. 2 End. All seat pairs were 3 ft 8 in (1.12 m) over armrests and could rotate and recline with footrests provided; and reading lights were provided at least on the first class standard gauge cars. The centre aisle is around 1 ft 7 1/2 in (0.495 m) wide, and illuminated with fluorescent lights. A public address system is fitted for announcements.

First class carriages were fitted with one pair of seats per window, to give 20 seats in the No. 1/smoking end and 28 in the No. 2/non-smoking end; spacing was a little over 4 ft (1.2 m).

Second class carriages were similar, but with six rows of four seats in the No. 1/smoking end behind three windows, and ten rows of four seats in the No. 2/non-smoking end behind five windows. Total capacity was 64.

The first two cars of each class were fitted with timber veneer panels internally. Cars AZ3 and BZ3 were modified to allow quick conversion to standard gauge if needed, and to match most of the stock on the Sydney run they were fitted with laminex interiors in lieu. Later cars repeated this alteration.

From the mid 1960s the cars on broad gauge had their layouts modified; the first class carriage seats were respaced drastically to give 56 seats – 24 in the No. 1/smoking end and 32 in the No. 2/non-smoking end, with spacing reduced to about 3 ft 10 in (1.17 m). The changes to the second class cars were far more minor, as the change from 64 to 68 seats only required one additional row of seats in line with the smoking/non-smoking partition, which was modified to suit. When these modifications were completed, the tare weight of the cars increased to 48t 14c 1Q 0L. The change occurred later on the standard gauge carriages, some not gaining the extra seats until the mid 1990s when they were returned to broad gauge. Smoking was banned in first class carriages from 1986, and from all trains in Victoria in 1989.

From the 1980s the cars were gradually converted and upgraded to suit the requirements of the New Deal, and the fleet was renumbered as part of that project to match the new reservations and rolling stock management systems. Cars 1-8AZ took on numbers 251–258; cars VBK1-5 became 262, 260, 261, 259 and 263 respectively; cars 1-7BZ were renumbered 264–270, and cars 1-6VFK changed to 271–276. Most cars were modified and some reclassified during the upgrade process, with 1-8AZ, for example, becoming ACZ. VBK263 spent nearly a year operating on the broad gauge system as AZ263 before its conductor compartment was fitted.

When the six standard gauge VFK cars were converted to broad gauge in the 1990s, they were given the code BZS to indicate that they were ex-Standard Gauge, with 64 seats matching the capacity of a typical BS steel carriage. Cars 271 and 275 were the first to transfer across, in 1990, and the other four were shifted in 1992 in preparation for the replacement of the Melbourne/Sydney Express with an XPT consist. Between 1995–1997 these six cars were refitted internally, with a larger door at one end and seats respaced, to provide sitting for 76 passengers and a parking space for one wheelchair. The new format was called BZN, and the cars were allocated to N sets.

Of the seven BZ carriages, three were sold to West Coast Railway in 1995 for use on their Warrnambool route – 267, 269 and 270. The remaining four – 264, 265, 266 and 268 – were retained by V/Line Passenger. In 1996 BZ265 was converted to the BZN format, matching the changes applied to the six ex-standard gauge carriages; BZ266 followed in 1998. In 1999 the other two were modified to a different format, known as BTN. This had been applied to BCZ263 in the previous year, and used the carriage shell with a new interior identical to that of the BN cars, with 88 seats in a 2+3 format and no special functions. When West Coast Railway's stock was sold off in 2004, V/Line re-acquired BZ267, and in 2007 it was also converted to the BZN format. BZ269 and BZ270 were passed to heritage societies, Steamrail Victoria and 707 Operations (with ACZ255) respectively. BZ270 has been repainted in 707's livery of red with silver, but otherwise is largely unchanged since the extra four seats were added. BZ269 was stripped by Steamrail, renumbered BZ6 and named Hobsons Bay, and now operates as a function car with a bar serving drinks, but otherwise a large open space with no seating provided.

=== ACZ 1st Class & Conductor cars ===
ACZ, BCZ
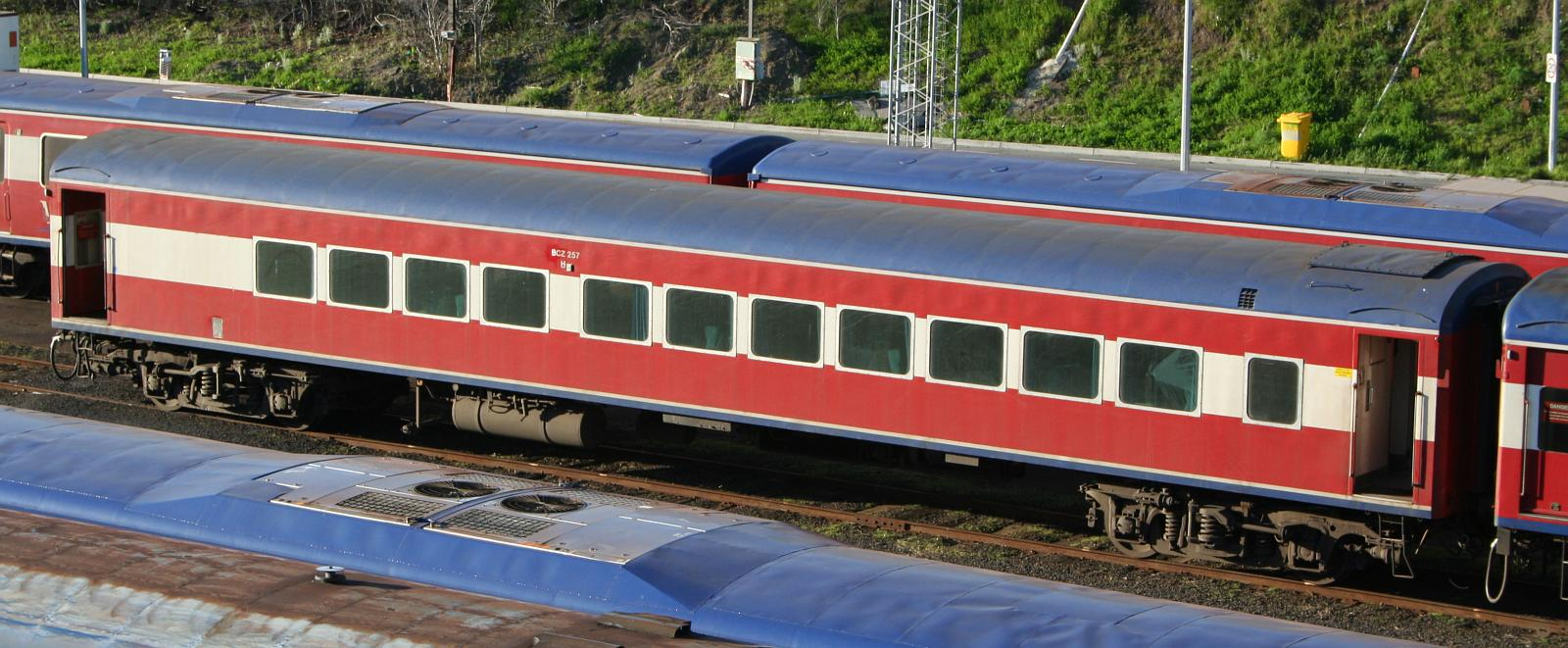
- ACZ carriage before refurbishment

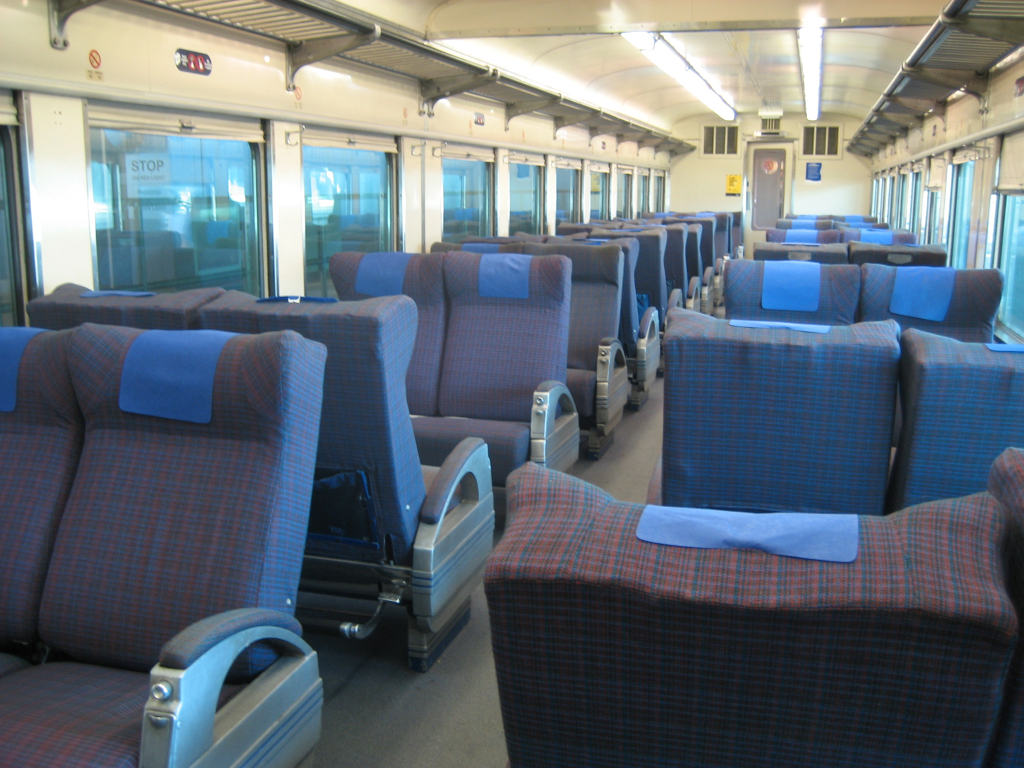
- Interior of a first class ACZ carriage
- Manufacturer: Victorian Railways
- Built at: Newport Workshops
- Family name: Z type
- Constructed: 1984–1985
- Number built: 13
- Number preserved: 2
- Capacity: 52 1st class passengers and a small guard/conductor's compartment. Some later 48 seats.
- Operator: Victorian Railways

Specifications
- Car body construction: Steel
- Car length: 71 ft 6 in (21.79 m) over body, 74 ft 8 in (22.76 m) over coupling points
- Width: 9 ft 9 in (2.97 m), 10 ft 1 15/16 in (3.10 m) over handrails
- Height: 13 ft 2 11/16 in (4.03 m)
- Weight: 47 LT 2 cwt 0 qtr (47.86 t)
- Power supply: Head-end power
- Bogies: 53 ft (16.15 m) centres
- Braking system: Westinghouse
- Coupling system: Autocouplers
- Track gauge: 5 ft 3 in (1,600 mm)

Following the introduction of the New Deal from 1981, the Z fleet carriages were modified and upgraded to suit the new timetable requirements. The fleet was mixed with the S type carriage group, and the cars were formed into three, four or five carriage sets for long-distance running. Each set used an ACZ car at what would be the southern/eastern end at Spencer Street Station, in lieu of the earlier practice of vans both ends or shifting the independent guard's van to the opposite end of the train at the end of each run. This allowed much faster turnarounds at termini.

The initial program was to convert and upgrade the pre-existing S and Z type carriage fleets. The cars would be repainted orange externally, and internally the refurbished Z cars would have stone beige laminate fitted where necessary. All cars would have a conductor's cupboard removed. Carpets and upholstery were replaced with similar materials to those used in the N type carriage construction program. Card tables and reading lights were to be provided in AZ cars and removed from BZ cars as applicable. Retention toilets were not fitted due to the cost, but illuminated "toilet occupied" signs were provided at each end of the saloons. The cost to refurbish each Z type carriage at Bendigo Workshops was expected to be around A$57,800. Initially this refurbishment program was to retain the AZ carriages in the nominal first class saloon format, and 2AZ, 5AZ and 7AZ were completed to that plan.

However, it quickly became apparent that the half-century-old, timber bodied CE vans were no longer up to the task of sustained high speed running on long distance services, so the plan had to be adapted. As a short-term patch four CD vans were borrowed from South Australia, with a plan from mid 1983 to have conductor compartments added as part of the AZ rebuilds. The cars were initially to be reclassed ACZ but retain their numbers. The female lavatory compartment was to be made unisex, and the male compartment replaced with a conductor's office. Marker and side lights were to be fitted only at that end of each carriage. The next Newsrail acknowledgement of the ACZ class is in June 1984 and refers to the cars as "1ACZ" and "3ACZ", though Vincent records the first ACZ conversion, 3AZ to ACZ253, entering service on 23 February 1984 and 251ACZ ex 1AZ nearer to the end of the conversion program. ACZ251 was sighted in service, alongside BRS229, by or on 21 June 1984.

By late August 1984 ACZ255 was in service and ACZ254 was expected to enter service before the end of the year; at that time the eight "Z sets" were marshalled with ACZ251, ACZ253, ACZ255 and one more unidentified, while the other four sets used CD vans borrowed from Australian National Railways.

Two further cars were transferred from the standard gauge fleet in 1986, to provide ten ACZ-BRS sets to mix with BZ and BS economy sitting cars. A typical regional consist at the time would have been BS-BZ-BRS-ACZ, plus or minus a BS car depending on requirements. The final three standard gauge VBK cars were converted to broad gauge ACZ in 1990–1991, though all had been renumbered to match the New Deal system by 1987.

The modified ACZ cars had the toilets and four seats removed from the east end, and that space was utilised as the new guard's compartment to match that provided in the new ACN cars. This reduced their sitting capacity from 56 to 52 passengers, with the expectation that most luggage would be stored in an attached luggage van of the D series. Periscopes were fitted to allow guards to check signals, but as the guards were phased out the small compartment was handed over to conductors as an office area, and the periscopes were removed.

Introduction of the Sprinter fleet from 1993 rendered some of the regional loco-hauled carriage sets obsolete, so the vehicles were withdrawn and stored, typically at Ballarat or Bendigo workshops; and three (252, 255, 257) were sold to West Coast Railway when that company gained operational accreditation. ACZ252 was the first air-conditioned carriage to be painted in the West Coast Railway corporate livery, entering service in October 1995. ACZ260 was supposed to be included in the sale but was damaged a few days before the handover; it had been stored at Newport Workshops for 22 years, before rebuilt by V/line in 2017–18 to become a power van for the Albury standard gauge service.

As patronage increased approaching the new millennium they were gradually called back into service, and converted to provide additional Economy seating capacity. BCZ261 was the first to re-enter service in this way, refurbished and painted in the new crimson livery but without internal alterations, in September 1995. It was followed over the next year by cars BCZ251, 253, 254, 258 and 263; a sighting on Monday 20 November 1995 saw locomotive N452, hauling BCZ258-BCZ251-BCZ261-ACZ263-ACZ259 on the 17:40 train to South Geelong; in that consist, the locomotive and cars 261 and 259 were painted red, while the other three cars remained in orange. Many of these cars were rotated and attached to the west end of existing sets, rather than reforming their previous consists, to provide a temporary facility for wheelchair storage following passage of the Disability Discrimination Act in 1992. ACZ cars 259 and 262 were retained in service as loose 1st class carriages, for attaching to special consists as required; and ACZ256 was stored at Bendigo pending restoration and conversion to BCZ when the funding for the program ran out, so it was stored indefinitely. It was finally completed and re-entered service in 2000, following damage to some of the Sprinter vehicles and a jump in patronage.

In 2003 cars 251, 253 and 254 were converted to the new BTN format, with 88 seats arranged in 2+3, matching the capacity of the BN sitting carriages; and 256, 258 and 261 were converted to BZN, a modification of the BCZ arrangement with 76 economy seats in lieu of 52 1st class seats. The six cars were paired, then attached to three N type carriage sets. That left ACZ259, ACZ262 and BCZ263 with V/Line Passenger. When West Coast Railway folded in 2004, V/Line re-purchased cars ACZ252 and ACZ257. In 2006–2007, ACZ257, ACZ259 and ACZ262 were reclassed BCZ (to go with BCZ263), though no internal changes were applied at the time, and ACZ252 was converted to BZN252. BCZ262 was converted to the BZN format in or around 2008, and BCZ259 to BTN259 followed in 2013, leaving only BCZ257; this vehicle was used to form set Z57 when additional capacity was required on the Geelong line, and in more recent times it has been utilised as a secondary luggage storage area, attached to one of the regular N sets, often rostered to run to Swan Hill where the reduced capacity is manageable, and the increased comfort appreciated.

=== BZN & BTN conversions ===
BTN
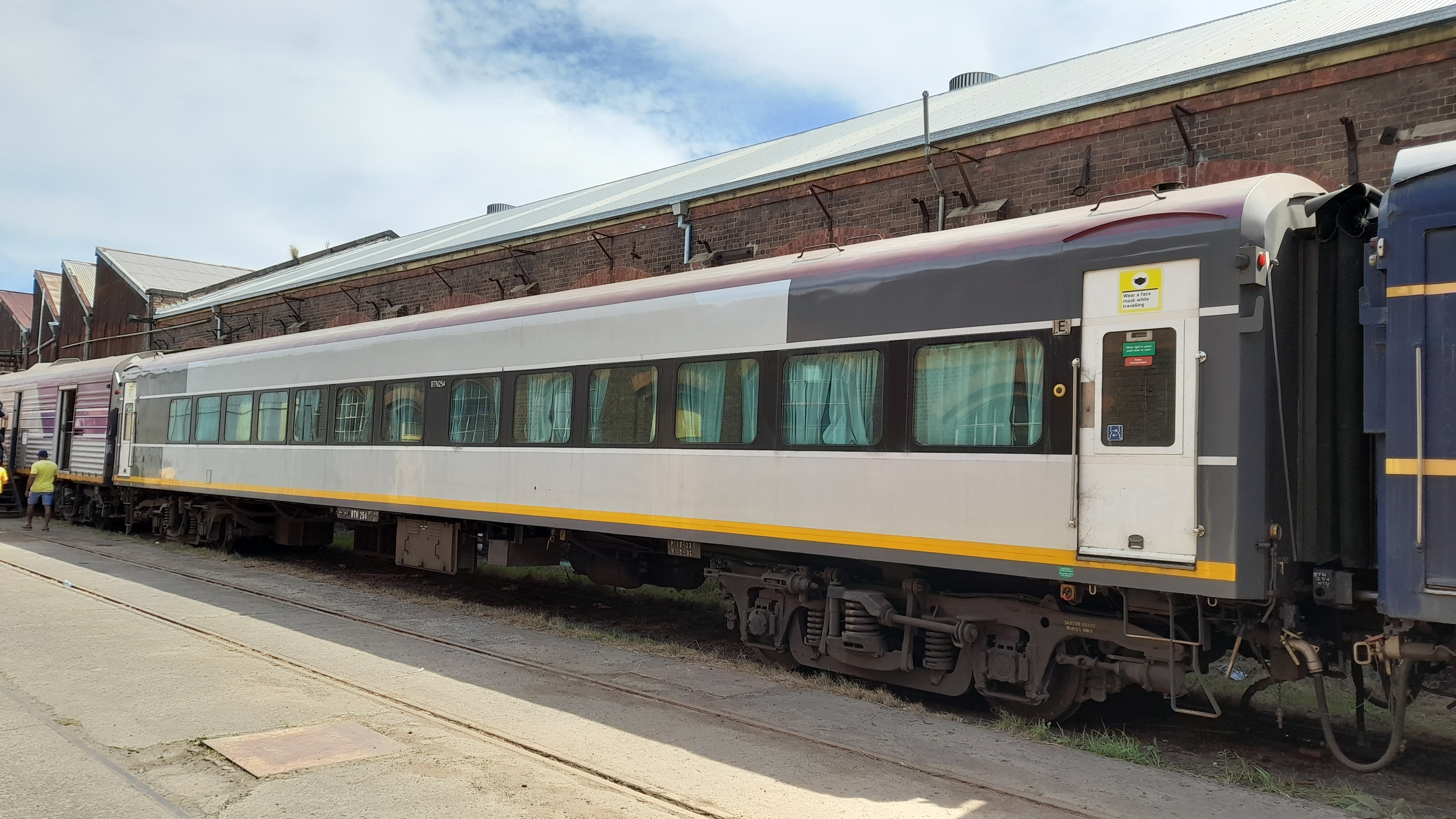
- BTN 254 at Newport Workshops in 2024
- Family name: Z type
- Constructed: 1998–2003
- Number built: 6
- Number preserved: 4
- Fleet numbers: 251, 253, 254 & 263 (ex AZ/ACZ/VBK); 264, 268 (ex BZ)
- Capacity: 88 Economy passengers

Specifications
- Car body construction: Steel
- Car length: 71 ft 6 in (21.79 m) over body, 74 ft 8 in (22.76 m) over coupling points
- Width: 9 ft 9 in (2.97 m), 10 ft 1 15/16 in (3.10 m) over handrails
- Height: 13 ft 2 11/16 in (4.03 m)
- Weight: 50 tonnes
- Power supply: Head-end power
- Bogies: 53 ft (16.15 m) centres
- Braking system: Westinghouse
- Coupling system: Autocouplers
- Track gauge: 5 ft 3 in (1,600 mm)

BZN
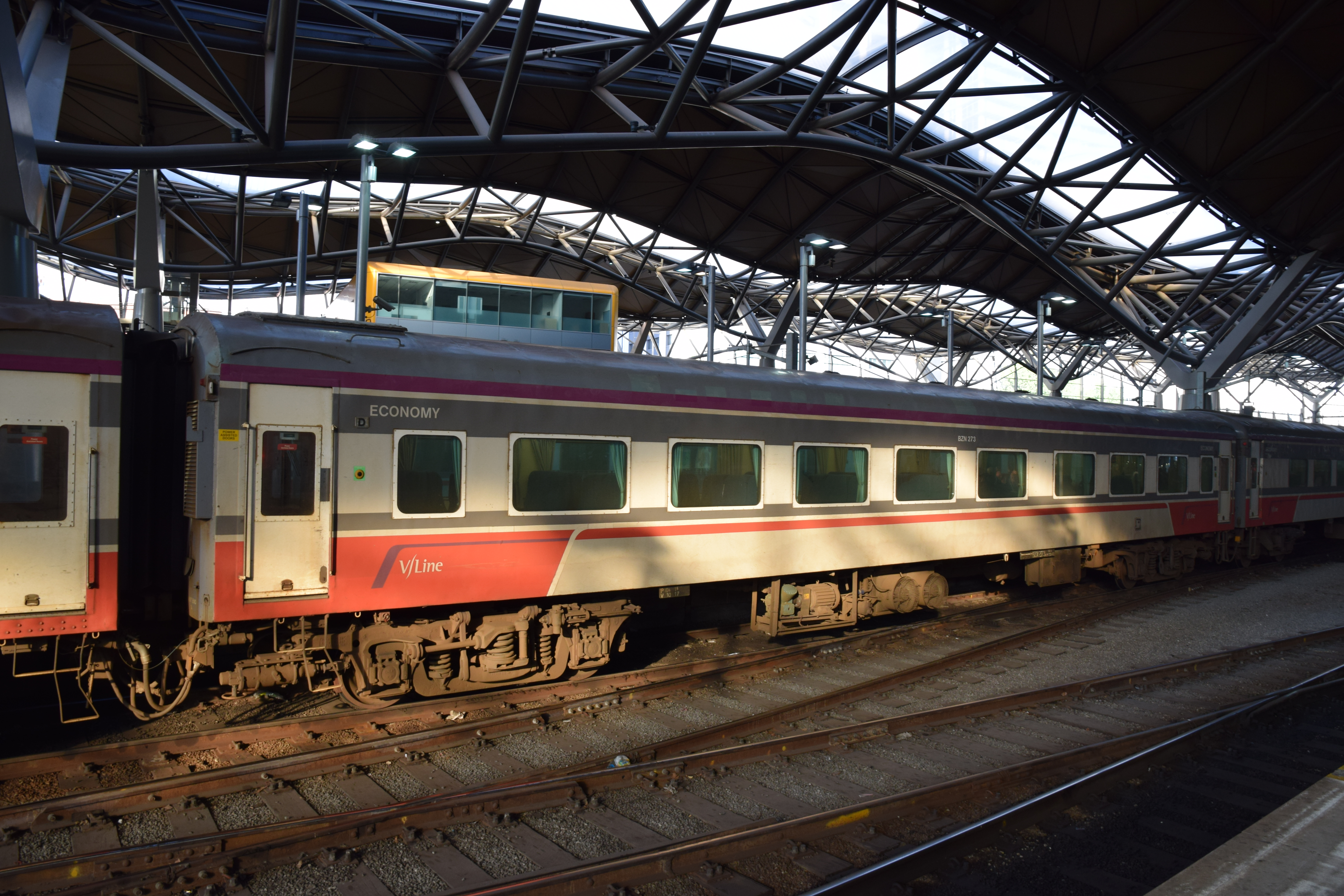
- BZN273 at Southern Cross station in 2016
- Family name: Z type
- Constructed: 1995–2013
- Number built: 15
- Fleet numbers: 252, 256–258, 261–262 (ex ACZ), 265–267 (ex BZ), 271–276 (ex BZS)
- Capacity: 76 Economy passengers & 1 wheelchair parking spot

Specifications
- Car body construction: Steel
- Car length: 71 ft 6 in (21.79 m) over body, 74 ft 8 in (22.76 m) over coupling points
- Width: 9 ft 9 in (2.97 m), 10 ft 1 15/16 in (3.10 m) over handrails
- Height: 13 ft 2 11/16 in (4.03 m)
- Weight: 50 tonnes
- Power supply: Head-end power
- Bogies: 53 ft (16.15 m) centres
- Braking system: Westinghouse
- Coupling system: Autocouplers
- Track gauge: 5 ft 3 in (1,600 mm)

The Z sets were gradually dissolved from the mid-1990s, and the cars reallocated to N carriage sets. From 1995–1998 eight cars were converted to BZN, with some seats removed and a wider doorway fitted to make the cars wheelchair-accessible; and in 1998–1999 a further three cars were converted to a more dense seating arrangement, with 88 seats provided in the same layout as the BN carriages. A further three cars of each type were created in 2003, followed by 252 and 267 to BZN in 2007, 262 in 2008 and 259 in 2013.

=== Composite Sleeping Car ===
SZ, VAM
- Manufacturer: Victorian Railways
- Built at: Newport Workshops
- Family name: Z type
- Constructed: 1963
- Number built: 1
- Number preserved: 1
- Fleet numbers: 1VAM, later SZ287
- Capacity: 20 sleeping passengers or 12 sleeping, 6 first and 8 second class passengers
- Operators: Victorian Railways (formerly), Seymour Railway Heritage Centre (current)

Specifications
- Car body construction: Steel
- Car length: 75 ft (22.86 m) over body, 78 ft 2 in (23.83 m) over coupling points
- Width: 9 ft 10 9/16 in (3.01 m)
- Height: 13 ft 6 11/16 in (4.13 m)
- Weight: 51 LT 13 cwt 0 qtr (52.48 t)
- Power supply: Head-end power
- Bogies: 53 ft (16.15 m) centres
- Braking system: Westinghouse
- Coupling system: Autocouplers
- Track gauge: 5 ft 3 in (1,600 mm) & 4 ft 8 1/2 in (1,435 mm)

The composite sitting/sleeping car, VAM1, was built with 10 evenly-spaced windows per side, plus a closer window and a door at the No. 2 end. Access to the car was via the doors at the No. 2 end, or via coupled carriages and the diaphragms linking them to VAM1. The ten windows each represented a single compartment. The first and second compartments at the No. 1 end were fitted with bench seats for four people each, while the other eight compartments were fitted with three-person seats divisible with retractable armrests. All seats could fold down to form a bed, and above that was a second bed, giving capacity for up to 20 sleeping passengers or up to 24 first-class and 8 second-class passengers. Generally speaking only the first four compartments at the No. 1 end were used for sitting passengers, and the remaining six were used exclusively for sleeping passengers. Partially because of this, the public address system was only wired to the four compartments at the No. 1 end, and not the other six. Each compartment also had its own cupboard, shower, toilet, card table and wardrobe. The interior was sheathed with laminex panels.

At the No. 2 end a small curtained-off area was reserved for the carriage conductor, with a seat to work at. Weight of the car was 51 tons 13 cwt. Water capacity was 280 gallons of cold water, plus 75 gallons of hot water for the showers. The car was fitted with marker lights, backup lamp brackets and tail discs at both ends, allowing it to trail any train. Notably, even though the car would only normally trail trains in New South Wales, the end-of-train marker was a Victorian Railways disc rather than a New South Wales Railways triangle.

The car now is under the care of Seymour Railway Heritage Centre and was restored to service in 2016.

=== PZ Power Van ===
ACZ260 has been modified and reclassed as power van PZ260, as of 17-Jan-2018. It was converted to standard gauge for use on the Albury line, then in 2022 the carriage was transferred to the Seymour Railway Heritage Centre and reclassified 10PZ, in line with its pre-New Deal identity of 10AZ

== In service ==
=== Individual cars ===
==== Sitting cars ====
Initially, AZ and BZ cars were allocated to long-distance passenger trains in Victoria. Cars would be attached to The Vinelander for Mildura, The Gippslander to Bairnsdale, the Great Northern to Swan Hill and also to Albury. If additional cars were available after that, they would be allocated to Horsham and/or Dimboola runs, which may have displaced an S type carriage or E type carriage for the runs to Warrnambool and Yarram.

===== Standard Gauge cars =====
When the standard gauge line to Albury was opened for passenger traffic, the Victorian Railways planned to convert five each of the AZ and BZ class carriages to standard gauge, to provide extra sitting capacity. This was in conjunction with a handful of S type carriages. The five AZ carriages, 9AZ to 13AZ, were converted in the last quarter of 1961, recoded and stored until required for the opening of the new line. They were followed by conversions of BZ cars 9–12, which were similarly stored. At this time the thirteenth BZ-type shell was still under construction and it caught fire on the production line, so 8BZ was quickly modified and was made available for standard gauge service in February 1962. The ten cars were allocated standard gauge codes of VBK 4, 2, 3, 1, 5 and VFK 2, 3, 4, 1 and 6. When 13BZ was completed it was immediately placed on standard gauge as VFK5.

The codes followed NSW carriage code convention, with V indicating Victorian stock, B and F indicating first and second class respectively, and K being a spare third letter to indicate the type. (Incidentally, the class "K" was later used for the Australian National Railways 500/600/700 series passenger carriages leased by V/Line.)

Cars 3AZ and 3BZ were fitted with extra equipment allowing a fast conversion to standard gauge if additional seating capacity was required on the Sydney run, and the extra capacity could be freed from the broad gauge system.

==== Sleeping car ====
VAM1, a Z-type sleeping and sitting car, entered service on the standard gauge in 1963. This car attached to the rear of the Spirit of Progress and was detached at Goulburn, then taken by a separate train to Canberra. When the car was returned to broad gauge on 25 October 1983, it was classed SZ287.

== Carriage sets ==
Operation of fixed carriage sets was not introduced until 1981, with the New Deal reforms of passenger rail operations and the introduction of the N type carriages. The original plan had been to form sets using a timber-bodied CE van, with an AZ car, BRS snack car carriage, and between one and three other BS and BZ carriages (typically one each BZ and BS), plus a parcels van trailing when necessary. A change was made shortly thereafter replacing the CE vans in the concept by modifying AZ first class carriages to ACZ configuration, with an internal guard/conductor's compartment, forming four-car Z sets.

7BZ was the first to be renumbered to the new scheme, becoming BZ270 on 21 November 1983. 2VBK was similarly renumbered to VBK260 on 20 December 1983, and 3VBK to VBK261 on 5 April 1984.

In 1984-5 the eight AZ cars had conductor compartments added, and were reclassed as ACZ 251–258, followed by ACZ260 and 262 ex VBK cars 2 and 4 in 1986. 1990–1991 saw the three remaining VBK cars transferred to broad gauge, as ACZ259 (ex VBK259), ACZ261 (ex VBK261) and AZ263 (ex VBK263); the latter was converted to ACZ within a year.

Other cars were simply recoded, with VAM1 moving to broad gauge and being reclassed SZ287, while the seven broad gauge and six standard gauge economy carriages were renumbered 264–276 ex 1BZ-7BZ, VFK1-VFK6.

In the early 1990s the six VFK cars were returned to broad gauge and refitted internally with a better type of seating, being coded BZS to differentiate them from the existing BZ class. This was around the time the Riverina XPT was extended to Melbourne.

From 1993 the Z sets were broken up as the Sprinter railcars arrived, and by mid-1995 all the S type carriages had been withdrawn leaving one Z set (essentially a random assortment of whatever was available) on South Geelong services, and a handful of Z cars (BZ, BZS and BZN codes) attached to N sets. Later, two five-car sets were formed, coded VZ1 and VZ2. The loose cars were utilised as additional cars in the N type sets, with the last Z set being broken up in 2006. A number of loose ACZ / BCZ carriages remain, that can be attached to N type sets.

When West Coast Railway started operating their own trains around 1995, they purchased a handful of carriages from V/Line. Those included ACZ252, 255 and 257, and BZ 267, 269 and 270. ACZ260 was another intended purchase but it had been damaged while on lease to West Coast Railway, before the purchase could occur, so V/Line substituted one of the other three ACZ coaches.

From the early 2000s the Z cars, both ACZ and BZ/BZS, were fitted with upgraded seating to match the N type interiors. Cars rebuilt like this were coded BZN or BTN, depending on whether they were intended to be used as fourth or fifth carriages as attached to an N set.

In December 2008, a N carriage (ACN21) was withdrawn from service to be converted to SG to run on the upgraded Albury-Wodonga line. Before withdrawal this carriage was in N set SN7, along with the BS cars. Because of ACN21's withdrawal, a Z carriage was introduced into the set permanently. The 5 BS cars and the Z car (BCZ257) were joined into a set coded Z57, as a replacement for SN7.

In late 2014, BCZ257 was noted as being semi-permanently coupled to N set VN17 as the fourth carriage. It tends to run on Swan Hill and Bairnsdale services.

Z cars have been returned to service as more bogies are reconditioned. On Thursday 22 September 2016 a test train ran from Melbourne to Geelong and back, with two locomotives, set N11 at the west end and BZN cars 271, 267, 274 and 252.

=== Set history ===
As part of the 1981 New Deal, the steel country passenger rollingstock was organised into sets. The Z sets were numbered 51 to 63, after the ACZ carriages providing the conductor accommodation. However, the sets contained a mixture of S and Z type carriages.

Note: Colours are representative only, and do not directly correlate to liveries worn in the era.

After the car identities, "T" indicates through-cabled for head end power; H indicates that the car requires head end power for lighting and air conditioning but is fitted with batteries, and H indicates same without batteries.

==== V/Line pre-ACZ sets ====
As noted above, the original plan had been to reconfigure the S and Z type carriages into fixed sets paired with CE guard's vans. This proved problematic only a few years into the New Deal, necessitating borrowing four CD vans while gradually converting the AZ cars to ACZ with conductor accommodation at the east end.

CD7 was seen in Echuca in November 1981, in a mix with spare Overland carriages, as part of a special train run on behalf of the Victorian Division of the Customs Agents Institute of Australia. CD vans were also used for additional Overland services between Melbourne and Adelaide during the 1982/83 holiday season. The first recorded use of the CD vans on regular Victorian intrastate country services was in February 1982, with CD2, and further sightings of CD3 were made during Easter that year. A CD van, unidentified, was used on a special train to Seymour in mid-March 1983, not as part of a semi-fixed set with steel cars included. The CD vans were used on an ad-hoc basis initially, with assorted random sightings made in March and April 1983. CD7 made regular appearances on The Vinelander services to Mildura during April 1983.

During August 1983 a similar van, SCD2, was occasionally sighted on the Overland, apparently substituting for a CO van and not part of the CD van lease.

In the Victorian carriage roster coinciding with the delivery of the 18th N set, eight fixed consists were rostered for long-distance intrastate services of which four (rosters 23–26) used CD vans; those included trips to Geelong, South Geelong, Albury and Warrnambool. However, due to failures or last-minute adaptations, van 33CE was swapped with one of the CD vans, resulting in 33CE running to Swan Hill and Albury while CD3 ran to Mildura. At least one issue of Newsrail divides these sets into "Z sets" and "S sets", though the distinction appears to be use of CD/CE vans on the former, and BCE vans on the latter. Observations in June and July 1983 placed Moorabool initially with 2BS and 2BZ, later with 6BZ and 7AZ (the latter all-over orange, sans silver stripes); and pairs 1BRS-3BS, 2BRS-2BS, 3BRS-1BS, each with a CD van.

Carriages were renumbered into the 200 series as part of a scheme developed during 1983. The AZ cars 1–8 became 251–258, though initially only ACZ253, and the VBK cars 1–5 became VBK259-263 (regardless of their original AZ sequence). Similarly, 1-8BZ became BZ264-270, with the six VFK cars becoming VFK271-276 regardless of original BZ numbering. The list provided in Newsrail does not list VAM1 to SZ287, though sleeping cars 11–16 are listed for renumbering as SJ281-284 then SS285-286. SZL287 [sic] was listed as having been renumbered and repainted orange in the following issue; the same article listed ACZ253 as the first of its type in service, painted orange and with "Z 53" stencilled on the ends. Set Z 53 was recorded running from Dimboola on 3 April 1984 as a five-car set, and on 7 April 1984 as a four-car set.

Roster N19, and later N19A, were brought into use with the delivery of the final three N type carriages, set N19 comprising ACN57-BRN56-BN55. These rosters started on 15 April 1984 and 20 May 1984 respectively with eight long-distance regional sets in use; rosters 21 and 22 required ACZ-BRS-BS-BE sets (though one used CE-AZ until the second ACZ was made available), 23–25 CD-AZ-BRS-BZ-BS, 26 was CD-AS-BRS-BS-BE, and 27–28 were CE-AZ-BRS-BZ-BS. Sets 21 and 22 worked Geelong, Bairnsdale and Traralgon services; 23, 24, 25, 27 and 28 had a mixed roster covering South Geelong, Albury, Bendigo, Dimboola, Mildura and Swan Hill, and set 26 remained captive to the Warrnambool corridor. As part of this roster ACZ253 was used, initially in one of The Gippslander's sets, with Z 53 marked as its set identity, to enable withdrawal of one of the timber-bodied BCE vans. The old set had five sitting compartments in the BCE, plus an extended buffet car, typically Moorabool. The new set used the van of ACZ253, and the buffet module and six sitting compartments of the BRS carriage, to provide a higher net economy capacity. First class capacity of the set was 52 seats, down from 56 of the prior AZ arrangement (but more than the original AS and AZ capacity of 48 seats). By mid October 1984 four sets had ACZ cars included, with two on the Gippslander Bairnsdale/Geelong through-routed trips and two on the Albury, Mildura and Swan Hill rosters. The unique CD-AS-BRS-BS-BE set remained on the Warrnambool roster; plans to intermingle that roster with the Albury, Mildura and Swan Hill sets were not yet practical, so in the meantime two cars were refurbished as AS class rather than being downrated to BS (economy) class; one for the Warrnambool set and the other held in the spare airconditioned set SP1. One of the refurbished AS carriages was AS206; it re-entered service in the Warrnambool set in late 1984 with similar upgrades to the BS carriages, except using blue floor materials and three-across seating rather than four-across. AS210 followed, exiting Ballarat Workshops on 30 November 1984. ACZ254 re-entered service post conversion on 10 November 1984, and was in its set Z54 later the same day. The unique Warrnambool set was not sighted in December 1984 or January 1985, but re-appeared by the end of February.

From 9 December 1984 a new roster was brought into use, number H2. (Note: H2 was the second roster with H cars; previous rosters N2-N19 were based on the number of N sets available, rather than being sequentially numbered.) This roster used five of the nine SH sets then available for use, (Note: SH21 to SH28 and SH30.) and three of the four DRC railcars. However, the roster was partially limited by restored services to Leongatha and Stony Point, without the provision of proposed interurban carriages for the Gippsland corridor. A number of compromises were made to allow the roster to function, while also removing nearly all red-painted, non-airconditioned timber rolling stock from service:

- The four South Australian, steel non-airconditioned K type carriages and the four air-conditioned E type carriages were rearranged into their own sets, the former for South Geelong and Bacchus Marsh services and the latter only for Geelong and South Geelong services; these sets no longer swapped with or ran on other lines.
- The non-airconditioned timber stock was restricted to only working afternoon peak services, one to Sunbury and two to Bacchus Marsh
- To cope with the long-distance set shortage, the new timetable had an arrival at Spencer Street from Mildura at 7:15 am forming the rescheduled 8:10 am service to Albury, making one of the quickest turn-arounds of a carriage set since the start of the New Deal.
- One H set was used on a Shepparton run during the day, despite not being set up for 115 km/h running or having a buffet car.

By March 1985 one of the two timber sets to Bacchus Marsh was replaced with new set LH32, leaving only two red timber sets in use – one each to Bacchus Marsh and Sunbury. However, partially due to the discovery of asbestos in some carriages, severe carriage shortages in February and March required transposition of carriages and sets on an ad-hoc basis, with many trains running with short or scratch consists with buses operating to provide emergency overflow capacity. At the same time, only two of the four DRCs were available, one being in Bendigo Workshops and the other idle at Spencer Street.

In early 1985 standard gauge carriage VBK263 was noted having been refurbished internally, using the same blue cloth as applied to broad gauge first class carriages. In January 1985 the two non-orange sets on the Geelong line – the non-airconditioned K set with CE van and the non-steel E set with CD van – were slightly altered. One of the airconditioned BE cars had to be removed from the E set, and it was briefly replaced with a red, non-airconditioned BE carriage. Later, 1AK was removed from the K set and made the fourth carriage of the E set, while the second aircondtioned AE carriage was placed on the K set in its place. By 16 February 1985 the AK had moved back to its normal placement.

Roster H3 from 14 April 1985 introduced reclining seats in the fourth carriage of Vinelander sets. To achieve this, the five former ACZ-BRS-BZ-BS sets were reconfigured as ACZ-BRS-BZ-BZ for the Albury and Mildura runs, and two sets were made ACZ-BRS-BS-BS, matching the two sets which were already alloczated to the Gippslander and Warrnambool runs. Swan Hill and some Albury services were converted to N type carriage rosters, while the formerly Warrnambool-allocated CD-AS-BRS-BS-BS set was allocated to Geelong services with the buffet module generally out of use. The last regular passenger train to use wooden, non-airconditioned rolling stock ran in August 1985. The timetables for a number of runs and schedules were adjusted by a few minutes from 27 October 1985. Single-person operation of buffet modules was expected to start on that day, but ended up being delayed to 10 November 1985. This alteration made it economic to open the buffets on certain Gippsland and Geelong services which previously did not provide that service, despite having buffet-fitted carriages allocated. Carriage roster H4 extended the weekday morning Shepparton service to Cobram; this was previously rostered as an Long H set fresh off a Bacchus Marsh run, but was shuffled with Ballarat and Geelong services to give an N set to Cobram, Z set to Ballarat and Long H set to Geelong instead.

The 2 March 1986 timetable introduced an extra Sunday Bairnsdale train and shuffled some H sets, DERMs and DRCs, to take advantage of delivery of set LH33 and subsequent restoration of SH21. The H sets were used on additional Kyneton, Sunbury and Seymour trips, and DRCs replaced DERMs on the morning and afternoon Seymour, evening Sunbury, and afternoon, evening and Saturday afternoon Bacchus Marsh trips. Some Seymour trips were rescheduled with faster speeds, saving up to 19 minutes. A Sunbury evening service was reinstated with DERMs, having been run by bus replacements for an extended period previously, and other DERM rosters included Sunbury and Kyneton in the mornings, and Bacchus Marsh in the afternoon and evenings. Two five-carriage Z sets, comprised of ACZ-BRS-BS-BS-BS, were introduced for use on Bairnsdale long distance and Geelong commuter trips, with weekend Warrnambool and Dimboola runs. The first reported sighting of a five-carriage set on a Down Gippslander service through Trafalgar was ACZ-BRS-BS-50BES-1BG, on 10 March 1986, and subsequent sets typically included at least one blue carriage. In March 1986, partially due to a downturn in standard gauge interstate traffic, cars 2VBK and 4VBK were withdrawn from service, converted to ACZ260 and ACZ262 respectively, and used to form additional Z sets. This change allowed conversion of AS206 and AS210 to economy class, thus creating additional five-car Z sets formed as ACZ-BRS-BS-BS-BS. An amended schedule was published on 16 May 1986, mostly tweaking the N set rosters. Due to overcrowding the 6:30 pm Down Bendigo train (roster 14) was amended to run express through Sunbury on Friday nights, and the railmotor (roster 39) ordinarily working the 5:58 pm and 9:35 pm Bacchus Marsh services was diverted to run an additional Sunbury (6:37 pm) and Seymour (8:55 pm) service; the Bacchus Marsh services were transplanted to roster 31. Operational challenges plagued the Gippsland region during this time; many Up Traralgon trains were given particularly poor slots in the timetables to pass through the suburban area with slow running behind suburban services common from Narre Warren to the city. Also, due to locomotive shortages, Saturday evening Gippsland trains were regularly run with two or three T class locomotives, but these were unable to keep the schedule and would often run up to half an hour late. The first sighting of an S class east of Dandenong, and of an N class locomotive to Traralgon, was on the 28 June 1986 run of the 8:25 am Bairnsdale passenger service, with N455 leading east-facing S309.

On the standard gauge, from 3 August 1986 the Spirit of Progress and the Southern Aurora were both cancelled and replaced with a single train, reflecting dwindling interstate rail patronage and freeing additional carriages for conversion to broad gauge. This alteration meant there was no evening service to Benalla, Wangaratta and Albury, so in Roster H4B from the same day the evening broad gauge train was rescheduled as a five-car ACZ-BRS-BS-BS-BS set otherwise normally used on the Geelong line with occasional Ballarat trips. Five-car sets still ran to Bairnsdale on Sundays and Monday mornings, but other trains were reduced to four-car ACZ-BRS-BS-BS sets. To manage overcrowding on the line to Bacchus Marsh, the K set was taken from one of the Geelong line's peak hour rosters and swapped for an H set. The latter change required rescheduling on the Geelong line to accommodate the H set being restricted to 100 km/h.

As at 3 October 1986 fifteen D vans were painted in the new V/Line livery of orange with white and green stripes, though three of those did not have logos applied to the sides.

From 16 February 1987 some Warragul trains were worked by suburban EMU sets rather than locomotive-hauled sets. These services were worked by and ticketed as V/Line services that just happened to use suburban rolling stock, contrasting the Stony Point line which was a suburban service that happened to use V/Line rolling stock.

The next fleet reorganisation was made in February 1987, taking on board the need for V/Line to reallocate sets to better accommodate peak traffic. The previous Z set configuration had been two ACZ-BRS-BS-BS-BS sets, and three each ACZ-BRS-BS-BS and ACZ-BRS-BZ-BZ sets (with two ACZ, two BRS, two BZ and one BS car (Note: Vincent lists BS201-213, but VFS214, VFR215, VFX216 and VFX217 which must have still been allocated to standard gauge. (Note: 1VFX was actually in the workshops at this time, re-entereing service as VFX216 around March 1987.)) spare on broad gauge); after the change, there were four ACZ-BRS-BS-BS-BS sets, and two each ACZ-BRS-BZ-BZ and ACZ-BRS-BZ sets, the latter configuration being functionally similar to a reduced-capaacity N set. The new arrangement used the same number of carriages and gave the same quantity of spares. The change was made because three cars was deemed sufficient capacity for the Mildura trains outside of weekend traffic, and this allowed increased capacity on the corridors that needed it. However, some inefficiencies crept into the roster (now CW2), including an H type set that had no scheduled movements during the morning peak, and one of the two Mildura sets had a 27-hour turnaround time at Mildura station. Several trains were reduced by one carriage each to allow for the weekday reduction and weekend increase in Mildura line capacity, and about a fifth of the rosters were given Monday-only variants to recover from the weekend shuffling. On weekends H sets and the non-airconditioned K set ran to Geelong, one of Mildura's three-car sets was used to Cobram, and the E set ran to Ballarat. Z cars returned to Gippsland's roster after a five-year absence, and the five-car sets with three BS carriages each made regular appearances on Albury, Warrnambool and Bendigo services. There was a suggestion that the timetable alterations had resulted in a 40% drop in patronage from Trafalgar on the Gippsland line, due to removal of the afternoon outbound trip, and some commuters were driving to Warragul and catching a suburban train from there.

in March–April 1987 BRS224 was briefly borrowed to bolster an N set, which was reported as briefly running with ACN21-BN11-BRS224 in lieu of the normal BRN car. This followed the use of BRS227 replacing an unidentified BRN car in an N set during December 1986. A separate report showed 12ACN-BRN44-19BN on a run to Cobram at the same time as BRS224 being used in the N set, so it must have been substituting for BRN20 at the time. This was also a rare early case of a V/Line orange N set in multiple liveries, as ACN12 and BRN44 were painted with white and green stripes, while BN19 still had the window-height silver stripes. Apparently the BRS cars had to be placed as the third carriage of their N set due to coupling constraints.

As at mid-1987 the V/Line business plan through 1990 expected the standard gauge S and Z type cars to be converted from standard gauge to broad gauge in the near future, enabled by the introduction of XPT-like replacement trains and permitting the withdrawal of the remaining E and K type carriages.

===== Sets with BCE vans =====
Code	Set No.	From	To	Car F	Car E	Car D	Car C	Car B	Car A (East end)	Van	Capacity	Weight	Length	Changes to achieve	Notes
BCE	1	By 15 Oct 1983	Post 15 Oct 1983		50BES	4BZ	10BRS	1AZ	1BCE						Swan Hill service
BCE	1	By 20 Dec 1983	Post 20 Dec 1983			67BWL	1BE	75AW	1BCE						
BCE	2	By 27 Oct 1984	Post 27 Oct 1984		29BE	1BW	79BW	5AW	2BCE						Geelong-Traralgon set.
BCE	2	By end of Feb 1984	Post Feb 1984			30BE	30AE	29BE	2BCE		48 1st + 185 Economy				Sunbury set.
BCE	4	By 23 Oct 1983	Post 23 Oct 1983		4BE	1BS	Moorabool	2AZ	4BCE						Bairnsdale service
BCE	4	By 23 Oct 1983	Post 23 Oct 1983		4BE	BS204	Moorabool	2AZ	4BCE						Bairnsdale service
BCE	4	By 27 Oct 1984	Post 27 Oct 1984			57BES	2BE	60BES	4BCE						Geelong-Traralgon set.
BCE	4	By 07 Nov 1984	Post 07 Nov 1984				2BE	60BES	4BCE						Sunbury set
BCE	2	By 25 Nov 1984	Post 25 Nov 1984			33BE	2BE	60BES	2BCE					Gain 2BCE ex Bacchus Marsh set; also 33BE	Sunbury set
BCE	4	By 29 Nov 1984	Post 29 Nov 1984				33BE	60BES	4BCE					Restore 4BCE in lieu of 2BCE; lose 2BE	Sunbury set
BCE	2	By 07 Nov 1984	Post 07 Nov 1984			82BW	1BW	79BW	2BCE						Bacchus Marsh set

===== Sets with BCPL vans =====
Code	Set No.	From	To	Car F	Car E	Car D	Car C	Car B	Car A (East end)	Van	Capacity	Weight	Length	Changes to achieve	Notes
BCPL	29	By 07 Nov 1984	Post 28 Dec 1984		35BW	68BWL	14BE	66BWL	29BCPL						Bacchus Marsh afternoon set. 29BCPL was the last PL type carriage in service.
BCPL	29	By 04 Apr 1985	Post 04 Apr 1985		14BE	35BW	68BWL	66BWL	29BCPL					Same carriages, but move 14BE to car E position.	
BCPL	29	May 1985	Jun 1985		14BE	68BWL	35BW	66BWL	29BCPL					Order of carriages occasionally shuffled.	After withdrawal, by 15 November 1986 29BCPL was allocated to the Seymour Loco Steam Preservation Group.

===== Sets with CD vans =====
Code	Set No.	From	To	Car F	Car E	Car D	Car C	Car B	Car A (East end)	Van	Capacity	Weight	Length	Changes to achieve	Notes
CD	1	By 30 Mar 1983	Post Jun 1983			25BE	45BEL	60BES	19AE	CD1					During Easter, Numurkah, Bacchus Marsh, Sunbury and Mildura services, the latter with VMAY8-VMBX50-VMBX13-AMNXD3158 [sic]-Sleeper No.4-Sleeper No.1-No.2-No.3 attached to 25BE. After Easter, Geelong services. By Queens Birthday weekend, to Warrnambool roster.
CD	1	By 11 Jun 1983	Post Jun 1983			17BE	3BS	1BRS	14AS	CD1					Warrnambool services.
CD	1	By 29 Oct 1983	Post 29 Oct 1983			12BS	1BZ	2BRS	4AZ	CD1					Albury service
CD	1	By 02 May 1984	By 02 May 1984			BS213	4BZ	2BRS	5BZ	CD1					Albury service. 5BZ without a logo, 2BRS with the VicRail logo, and BS213 with the V/Line logo.
CD	1	By 28 Aug 1984	Post 28 Aug 1984			BS213	6BZ	BRS226	7AZ	CD1					
CD	1	By 16 Feb 1985	Post 16 Feb 1985			BS202	BZ267	BRS228	7AZ	CD1					
CD	1	By 04 Apr 1985	By 04 Apr 1985			2BK	1BK	3BKL	51AE	CD1					
CD	2	By 08 Feb 1983	Post 08 Feb 1983			17BE	26BW	32BW	3AS	CD2					
CD	2	By 31 Mar 1983	Post 01 Apr 1983			46BEL	35BW	7BW	14AS	CD2					Warragul services
CD	2	By 28 May 1983	Post 28 May 1983			8BS	6BZ	2MRS	1AZ	CD2					Mildura The Vinelander services
CD	2	By 11 Jun 1983	Post 13 Jun 1983		19CE	31BE	1BZ	Murray	4AZ	CD2					Spare set made available at short notice, consist changed regularly. Dining car Murray would have been used in lieu of a BRS buffet car. Murray was removed from the set in June 1983 following staff complaints, in conjunction with N set deliveries making the spare set's buffet facility redundant.
CD	2	By 29 Oct 1983	Post 29 Oct 1983			31BE	3BS	1BRS	3AS	CD2					Geelong service
CD	2	By 28 Sep 1984	Post 28 Sep 1984			34BE	BS211	BRS226	BZ270	CD2					
CD	2	By 26 Oct 1984	Post 27 Oct 1984			BS211	BZ270	BRS226	8AZ	CD2				Lose 34BE, gain 8AZ, move BZ270.	
CD	2	By 07 Nov 1984	07 Nov 1984			BS209	BZ264	BRS225	7AZ	CD2					Albury, Mildura, Swan Hill services
CD	2	08 Nov 1984	Post 08 Nov 1984			BS203	BZ264	BRS225	7AZ	CD2				Lose BS209, gain BS203	Albury, Mildura, Swan Hill services
CD	2	15 Nov 1984	Post 15 Nov 1984			BS209	BZ264	BRS225	7AZ	CD2				Lose BS203, gain BS209	Albury, Mildura, Swan Hill services
CD	2	18 Nov 1984	Post 18 Nov 1984			BS203	BZ264	BRS225	7AZ	CD2				Lose BS209, gain BS203	Albury, Mildura, Swan Hill services
CD	2	29 Nov 1984	Post 29 Nov 1984			34BE	BRS227	BZ264	AS210	CD2				Lose BS203, gain AS210 and 34BE	Albury, Mildura, Swan Hill services. Note BRS is Car C not Car B.
CD	2	12 Dec 1984	Post 12 Dec 1984			1BG	BZ269	BRS227	8AZ	CD2					Albury, Mildura, Swan Hill services.
CD	2	By 28 Dec 1984	Post 28 Dec 1984			4BE	BZ268	BRS229	8AZ	CD2					Albury, Mildura, Swan Hill services.
CD	2	By 09 Feb 1985	Post 09 Feb 1985			BS202	BZ264	BRS228	7AZ	CD2					Albury, Mildura, Swan Hill services.
CD	2	31 Jan 1987	02 Feb 1987		VOCX442F	Norman	BS208	VQDW12C	Goulburn	CD2					"Rocking on the Rails" excursion train, worked by B76. VQDW flat wagon used as a stage at each station visited.
CD	2	26 Mar 1987	26 Mar 1987		604	601	502	501	PH451	CD2					Australian Vintage Travel service worked by A66 and R707 from Newport to Frankston and return.
CD	3	By 29 Mar 1983	Post 31 Mar 1983			53BES	7BZ	3MBS	4AZ	CD3					VBPY116-VBY114 trailing; Geelong and Albury services
CD	3	By 13 Jun 1983	Post 13 Jun 1983			1BG	5BZ	BRS2	3BZ	CD3					No first class accommodation.
CD	3	By 16 Sep 1983	Post 16 Sep 1983			12BS	6BZ	3MBS	6AZ	CD3					Up Mildura run, swapped with 33CE set. Luggage van trailing. Coupled to set N18 (ACN54-BRN52-BN1), Sleepers No.5, No.4, No.13 and No.11, and Motorail cars VMAY9 and 8.
CD	3	By 23 Jun 1984	Post 23 Jun 1984			2BS	5BZ	BRS229	4AZ	CD3					BS, BZ known to be orange.
CD	3	By 14 May 1984	Post 09 Jun 1984			2BS	5BZ	BRS227	5AZ	CD3					BS, BZ known to be orange.
CD	3	By 26 Jul 1984	Post 26 Jul 1984}			8BS	12BS	BRS226	2BZ	CD3					
CD	3	By 13 Aug 1984	Post 15 Aug 1984}			12BS	6BS	BRS226	2BZ	CD3					
CD	3	By 28 Dec 1984	Post 28 Dec 1984			3BS	2BZ	BRS228	AS206	CD3					Warrnambool services
CD	3	By 04 Apr 1985	Post 04 Apr 1985			1BG	19BE	50BES	52AE	CD3					
CD	3	By 08 Sep 1985	Post 09 Sep 1985			BZ264	BS201	BRS225	AS206	CD3					BZ rather than BS as car "D".
CD	3	By 27 Feb 1986	Post 27 Feb 1986			BZ267	BS206	BRS228	BZ264	CD3					
CD	3	By 06 Mar 1986	Post 06 Mar 1986			BZ267	BZ265	BRS228	BZ264	CD3				Lose BS206, gain BZ265	
CD	3	By 16 Apr 1987	Post 16 Apr 1987			1BK	3BKL	2BK	1AK	CD3					
CD	7	12 Oct 1987	12 Oct 1987			2BK	1BK	3BKL	1AK	CD3					Worked to Bacchus Marsh by C507-C501-BL26-BL35, due to prior industrial action which had the engines stavled at Dynon for about five days prior. May have been the first use of BL class locomotives on a V/Line passenger train.
CD	7	By 19 Feb 1983	Post 19 Feb 1983			12BE	29BE	4AE	18CE	CD7					Seymour service.
CD	7	By 21 Jun 1983	Post 21 Jun 1983			34BE	##BZ	1MBS	##AZ	CD7					Albury service. AZ and BZ cars not identified in source; colours unknown.
CD	7	By 05 Jul 1983	By 23 Aug 1983			32BW	3BS	1BRS	14AS	CD7					Warrnambool set.
CD	7	By 23 Aug 1983	Post 27 Aug 1983			20BE	3BS	1BRS	14AS	CD7					This consist matches the specification for Run 26, running Warrnmabool services.
CD	7	By 29 Oct 1983	Post 29 Oct 1983			34BE	6BZ	3BRS	7AZ	CD7					Albury service
CD	7	By 09 Jan 1984	Post 13 Jan 1984			34BE	12BS	10BRS	3AS	CD7					Warrnambool service
CD	7	Post 16 Jun 1984	Post 16 Jun 1984			BS213	1BG	BRS226	2BZ	CD7					
CD	7	By 02 Jul 1984	By 11 Jul 1984}			1BG	BS213	BRS227	BZ270	CD7					
CD	7	By 02 Aug 1984	By 02 Aug 1984			BS213	BZ270	10BRS	6AZ	CD7					
CD	7	By 11 Aug 1984	Post 11 Aug 1984			BS213	BZ270	BRS228 (Note: Source says 288BRS, most likely a typo)	6AZ	CD7					Part of Mildura consist with VMAY20, VMAY2, 3PCO, Club Car No.1, Sleeper 3, Sleeper 16, Sleeper 15, SJ282, SZ287 at west end, and van D316 at east end. Run was a trial of the spare Overland Club Car on the Mildura service, with the PCO included only to provide power pending modifications to the Club Car. 7CD was previously sighted working as a set with 34BE-12BS-10BRS-3AS-7CD on 9 and 13 January 1984.
CD	7	By 04 Sep 1984	Post 04 Sep 1984			34BE	BZ264	BRS225	2BZ	CD7					
CD	7	By 13 Sep 1984	Post 13 Sep 1984			1BG	BZ264	BRS230	7AZ	CD7					Albury service
CD	7	By 20 Sep 1984	Post 09 Oct 1984			31BE	BZ264	BRS225	7AZ	CD7					Albury service
CD	7	By 20 Nov 1984	Post 24 Nov 1984			BS211	BZ270	BRS226	8AZ	CD7					Albury, Mildura, Swan Hill services
CD	7	By 25 Nov 1984	Post 25 Nov 1984			4BE	BZ270	BRS226	8AZ	CD7					Albury, Mildura, Swan Hill services
CD	7	04 Dec 1984	Post 06 Dec 1984			4BE	BZ264	BRS226	AS210	CD7					Albury, Mildura, Swan Hill services.
CD	7	20 Dec 1984	Post 20 Dec 1984			4BE	BZ268	BRS222	7AZ	CD7					Albury, Mildura, Swan Hill services.
CD	7	By 31 Jan 1985	Post 07 Feb 1985			4BE	3BZ	BRS227	AS210	CD7					Albury, Mildura, Swan Hill services.
CD	7	By 16 Feb 1985	Post 16 Feb 1985				19BE	BRS229	BZ269	CD7					Operating in an N set roster.
CD	7	By 16 Feb 1985	Post 16 Feb 1985			19BE	BS208	BRS229	BZ269	CD7				Not clear whether 19BE remained part of this consist.	
CD	7	By 19 Feb 1985	Post 19 Feb 1985			BS208	BZ267	BRS229	n/a	CD7					Albury, Mildura, Swan Hill services. No first-class carriage.
CD	7	By 20 Mar 1985	Post 23 Mar 1985		1BG	BRS224	BRS228	BRS229	7AZ	CD7					Note use of three BRS carriages; common during March 1985.
CD	7	By 27 Mar 1985	Post 27 Mar 1985			BRS224	BRS228	BRS229	7AZ	CD7					Lose 1BG.
CD	7	By 30 Mar 1985	Post 30 Mar 1985			12BS	BRS228	BRS229	7AZ	CD7					Lose BRS224, gain 12BS. Set ran with Norman/OS237.
CD	7	By 03 Apr 1985	Post 03 Apr 1985			12BS	BZ267	BRS229	7AZ	CD7					Lose BRS228, gain BZ267
CD	7	By 04 Apr 1985	By 04 Apr 1985			12BS	BZ267	BRS229	7AZ	CD7					
CD	7	By 30 Nov 1985	Post 30 Nov 1985			1BK	1BG	3BKL	52AE	CD7					
CD	7	By 27 Mar 1986	Post 31 Mar 1986			31BE	4BE	34BE	52AE	CD7					
CD	7	By 05 May 1986	Post 05 May 1986			31BE	50BES	4BE	51AE	CD7					
CD	7	By 01 Mar 1987	Post 29 Mar 1987			1BG	31BE	4BE	52AE	CD7					
CD	7	By 16 Apr 1987	Post 16 Apr 1987			1BG	31BE	50BE	52AE	CD7					
CD	7	07 May 1987	07 May 1987	502	707	501	605	603	604	CD7					Melbourne Limited special for the Warrnambool Cup. Worked by A81 then B76, with PH453 providing head-end power.
CD	7	27 Sep 1987	27 Sep 1987			31BE	34BE	50BES	51AE	CD7					

===== Sets with CE vans =====
As noted above, CE vans were intended to be used with Z sets but proved unsuited to the task, so were gradually withdrawn and replaced with ACZ cars.

By the end of 1984 33CE in orange had been sent to Newport Workshops for scrapping, while 18CE, 29CE and 37CE were removed from bogies onto semitrailers on 16 October 1984. This left 13CE and 31CE as the last in service, only to be used as spares.

Code	Set No.	From	To	Car F	Car E	Car D	Car C	Car B	Car A (East end)	Van	Capacity	Weight	Length	Changes to achieve	Notes
CE	13	By 03 Jun 1984	Post 03 Jun 1984			BS213	6BZ	BRS228	8AZ	13CE					Albury service
CE	13	By 02 Jul 1984	Post 02 Jul 1984			##BS	6AZ [sic]	BRS228	8AZ	13CE					Albury service. BS carriage unknown.
CE	13	By 28 Oct 1984	Post 28 Oct 1984			BS211	BZ270	BRS226	8AZ	13CE					Dimboola service.
CE	13	By 24 Sep 1984	Post 25 Sep 1984			50BES	BS213	BRS227	6BZ	13CE					
CE	13	By 10 Nov 1984	Post 25 Nov 1984			BS201	BS213	BRS227	BZ267	13CE					Albury, Mildura, Swan Hill services
CE	15	By 21 Apr 1984	Post 22 Apr 1984				57BES	60BES	52AE	15CE					Traralgon service
CE	15	By 04 Jun 1984	Post 04 Jun 1984			xxBS	7BZ	BRS224	7AZ	15CE					Albury service. BS number unknown.
CE	18	By 01 Apr 1984	Post 01 Apr 1984			1BS	6BZ	2BRS	BZ270	18CE					Horsham service
CE	19	By 25 Nov 1984	Post 28 Dec 1984			2BK	1BK	3BKL	1AK	19CE					Latter reference does not explicitly state 1BK as car "C".
CE	19	By 03 Apr 1985	Post 09 Apr 1985			BS210	7BS	BRS226	AS210	19CE					
CE	19	By 04 Apr 1985	By 04 Apr 1985			BS204	7BS	BRS226	AS210	19CE					
CE	28	By 04 Apr 1985	Post 04 Apr 1985				30BE	30AE	29BE	28CE					Spare carriage set.
CE	31	By 10 Feb 1985	Post 10 Feb 1985		14CW	4CW	57BES	47BEL	30AE	31CE					"Rutherglen Red" service.
CE	33	By 30 Oct 1983	Post 30 Oct 1983			7BS	2BZ	BRS225	8AZ	33CE					Mildura service
CE	33	By 08 Apr 1984	Post 14 Apr 1984			3BS	3BZ	BRS225	6AZ	33CE					Horsham and Albury services
CE	33	By 10 May 1984	Post 10 May 1984			3BS	6BZ	BRS225	BZ270	33CE					Albury service
CE	33	By 21 May 1984	Post 21 May 1984			12BS	4BZ	BRS225	BZ270	33CE					Albury service
CE	33	By 11 Sep 1984	Post 11 Sep 1984			34BE	3BS	1BRS	BZ270	33CE					Albury service
CE	37	By 20 Dec 1983	By 20 Dec 1983			25AW	7BE	75BW	10AS	37CE					Warragul service

===== Sets with CP vans =====
Code	Set No.	From	To	Car F	Car E	Car D	Car C	Car B	Car A (East end)	Van	Capacity	Weight	Length	Changes to achieve	Notes
CP	5	By 28 Nov 1984	Post 28 Nov 1984			36BE	57BES	47BEL	34BW	5CP					
CP	5	By 07 Nov 1984	Post 07 Nov 1984			34BW	55BES	45BEL	52AE	5CP					Geelong, not Traralgon services.
CP	5	By 29 Nov 1984	Post 29 Nov 1984			36BE	57BES	47BEL	34BW	5CP					Geelong, not Traralgon services.
CP	7	By 26 Nov 1984	Post 26 Nov 1984			29BE	16BE	2BW	30AE	7CP					
CP	31	By 07 Nov 1984	Post 07 Nov 1984			57BES	36BE	18BE	35AW	31CP					
CP	34	By 27 Oct 1984	Post 27 Oct 1984			55BES	47BE	45BE	52AE	34CP					Geelong-Traralgon set. CP van notable in lieu of regular van; four years later this van would become CP291 in the V/Line fleet.

===== Sets with CW vans =====
CW vans were generally used with consists on shorter-distance runs than the Z sets, and those were gradually being replaced with the H sets. By the end of 1984 only vans 4, 9, 14 and 15 were used, and those only occasionally.

Code	Set No.	From	To	Car F	Car E	Car D	Car C	Car B	Car A (East end)	Van	Capacity	Weight	Length	Changes to achieve	Notes
CW	4	By 28 Oct 1984	Post 28 Oct 1984			19BE	3BS	BRS228	BZ267	4CW					Bairnsdale service. CW-BZ replacing ACZ.
CW	9	By 30 Jun 1984	Post 30 Jun 1984			12BS	4BZ	BRS225	6AZ	9CW					
CW	9	By 24 Apr 1984	Post 24 Apr 1984			31BE	7BS	1BRS	8AZ	9CW					Traralgon service
CW	15	By 25 Nov 1984	Post 27 Nov 1984			50BES	31BE	19BE	52AE	15CW					All four carriages airconditioned.
CW	15	By 25 Nov 1984	Post 25 Nov 1984			18BE	31BE	19BE	52AE	15CW					Geelong, not Traralgon services.

===== Borrowed Overland sets =====
From 1987, sitting carriages from The Overland would occasionally be borrowed from the morning arrival in Melbourne, make a return trip in place of a regional Z set, then rejoin the Overland consist on return to Spencer Street for use on the following overnight trip to Adelaide. This arrangement was partially used to compensate for inefficiencies in carriage rosters, including that roster CW2 from February 1987 left three carriages in Mildura unused for up to 28 hours.

Code	Set No.	From	To	Car F	Car E	Car D	Car C	Car B	Car A (East end)	Van	Capacity	Weight	Length	Changes to achieve	Notes
Overland		07 May 1987	07 May 1987			BJ9	CLub No.2	AJ1	BJ4	PCO1	176				Dimboola return trip, due to the ordinary N set being borrowed to supplement capacity for the Warrnambool Cup. Alternate source claims the consist was N456-D319-PBJ-4BJ-Club No.2-2AJ-1PCO.

==== V/Line Z Sets ====
As the ACZ cars came online they were organised into sets with assorted Economy class BRS buffet/compartment, BS compartment and BZ saloon cars. Sets were identified as Z 51–63, taking the number from the suffix of the ACZ car.

Code	Set No.	From	To	Car F	Car E	Car D	Car C	Car B	Car A (East end)	Van	Capacity	Weight	Length	Changes to achieve	Notes
Z	51	By 23 Mar 1989	Post 23 Mar 1989		BS210	BS202	BRS222	BS208	ACZ251		292	211t	114m		BRS222 was repainted to V/Line orange by 30 October 1986.
Z	51	By Nov 1984	During Nov 1984			19BE	3BS	BRS228	ACZ251						Albury, Mildura, Swan Hill services
Z	51	During Nov 1984	Post Nov 1984			12BS	51AE	BRS228	ACZ251						Albury, Mildura, Swan Hill services
Z	51	By 19 Dec 1984	Post 19 Dec 1984			4BE	BZ268	BRS227	ACZ251						Albury, Mildura & Swan Hill
Z	51	By 28 Dec 1984	Post 28 Dec 1984			BS209	BZ270	BRS227	ACZ251						Albury, Mildura & Swan Hill
Z	51	By 25 Jan 1985	Post 26 Jan 1985			AS210	2BZ	BRS224	ACZ251						
Z	51	By 11 Feb 1985	Post 11 Feb 1985			BS211	BZ267	BRS225	ACZ251						
Z	51	By 15 Feb 1985	Post 15 Feb 1985			BS209	BZ268	3BRS	ACZ251						
Z	51	By 15 Feb 1985	Post 23 Feb 1985			BS209	2BZ	3BRS	ACZ251					Lose BZ268, gain 2BZ	
Z	51	By 04 Apr 1985	04 Apr 1985			BS202	BZ269	1BRS	ACZ251						
Z	51	05 Apr 1985	Post 05 Apr 1985			BS201	BZ269	1BRS	ACZ251					BS201 replace BS202	
Z	51	26 Sep 1985	Post 26 Sep 1985			31BE	BZ268	BS213	ACZ251						
Z	51	27 Mar 1986	31 Mar 1986						ACZ251						Not a formal set. Other spare carriages at the time were BRS223, BRS229, BZ264, BS207, BS213, 51AE, 19BE, 50BES (27 March only), SS285 (at Mildura). Set SH28 was the rostered spare H set, and N15 the spare N set.
Z	51	By 16 Apr 1987	Post 16 Apr 1987				BZ267	BRS227	ACZ251						
Z	52	By 06 Aug 1984	Post 23 Aug 1984			8BS	BZ264	BRS225	ACZ252						First instance of a Z set with carriages listed in Newsrail. Various trips recorded with vans D302 or D309 attached.
Z	51	26 Jul 1987	26 Jul 1987		BS206	BS205	BS209	BRS221	ACZ251						
Z	51	05 May 1987	05 May 1987			1BG	19BE	52AE	ACZ251						52AE may have been used for Economy sitting.
Z	52	By 26 Oct 1984	Post 26 Oct 1984				2BZ	1BRS	ACZ252						
Z	52	By 27 Mar 1986	Post 27 Mar 1986		1BG	BS204	BS211	BRS222	ACZ252		290	214t	114m		
Z	52	By 05 Nov 1984	Post Nov 1984			34BE	2BZ	1BRS	ACZ252						Albury, Mildura, Swan Hill services
Z	52	By 30 Nov 1984	Post Nov 1984			BS209	3BZ	BRS224	ACZ252						Albury, Mildura, Swan Hill services
Z	52	By 30 Oct 1984	Post 30 Oct 1984			34BE	2BZ	1BRS	ACZ252						Albury, Mildura, Swan Hill services
Z	52	07 Dec 1984	Post 12 Dec 1984			BS209	3BZ	BRS224	ACZ252						Albury, Mildura, Swan Hill services.
Z	52	By 05 Jan 1985	Post 05 Jan 1985			BS202	BZ264	BRS224	ACZ252						Van D310 noted between engine and carriage set.
Z	52	By 12 Jan 1985	Post 16 Jan 1985			BS202	BZ264	BRS227	ACZ252					Lose BRS224, gain BRS227	
Z	52	By 19 Jan 1985	19 Jan 1985			BS207	BZ264	BRS227	ACZ252					Lose BS202, gain BS207	
Z	52	By 19 Jan 1985	Post 14 Feb 1985			31BE	2BZ	BRS224	ACZ252					Lose BRS227, BZ264, BS207; gain BRS224, 2BZ, 31BE	
Z	52	By 21 Feb 1985	21 Feb 1985			4BE	3BZ	BRS224	ACZ252					Lose 31BE, gain 4BE	
Z	52	22 Feb 1986	Post 22 Feb 1986			BS204	BS206	BRS227	ACZ252		228	171t	91m	Lose BRS224, 3BZ, 4BE; gain BRS227, BS206, BS204	
Z	52	By 04 Apr 1985	04 Apr 1985			BS211	BZ270	BRS222	ACZ252						
Z	52	04 Apr 1985	Post 04 Apr 1985			BS211	BZ270	BRS222	BZ266					BZ266 replaced ACZ252 on Thursday afternoon	
Z	52	By 13 Apr 1985	Post 13 Apr 1985			12BS	BZ265	BRS226	ACZ252						
Z	52	By 25 Feb 1985	Post 26 Feb 1985			BS204	3BZ	BRS224	n/a	VVBP32					(Probably) ACZ252 removed at Clunes due to hot axle box. On return trip from Mildura, van VBPY32 used for conductor accommodation.
Z	52	By 16 Apr 1987	Post 16 Apr 1987			BZ268	BZ266	BRS222	ACZ252						
Z	53	By 22 Feb 1986	Post 22 Feb 1986			BS210	BS208	BRS229	ACZ253		228	171t	91m		
Z	52	18 Sep 1987	18 Sep 1987				4BE	1BG	ACZ252						Set gained BRS by 28 September 1987.
Z	53	By 27 Mar 1986	Post 27 Mar 1986			BS210	BS208	BRS221	ACZ253		228	171t	91m	Lose BRS229, gain BRS229	
Z	53	By 23 Mar 1989	Post 23 Mar 1989		4BE	BS201	BRS230	BS213	ACZ253		300	211t	114m		
Z	53	By Nov 1984	During Nov 1984			1BG	7BS	BRS2XX	ACZ253						Albury, Mildura, Swan Hill services. BRS unknown.
Z	53	During Nov 1984	Post 25 Nov 1984			34BE	BS204	BRS230	ACZ253						Albury, Mildura, Swan Hill services
Z	53	Post 25 Nov 1984	Post Nov 1984			1BG	BS204	BRS230	ACZ253						Albury, Mildura, Swan Hill services
Z	53	By 19 Jan 1985	Post 19 Jan 1985			BS205	7BS	BRS226	ACZ253						Traraglon set
Z	53	By 28 Dec 1984	Post 28 Dec 1984			50BES	7BS	BRS230	ACZ253						Warrnambool services
Z	53	By 09 Apr 1985	Post 09 Apr 1985			BS205	BS209	3BRS	ACZ253						
Z	53	By 04 Apr 1985	By 04 Apr 1985			BS205	BS209	3BRS	ACZ253						
Z	53	19 Dec 1985	Post 19 Dec 1985			BZ266	BZ270	BRS221	ACZ253					BRS221 and BZ270 were in set Z57 the previous day.	
Z	53	By 16 Apr 1987	Post 16 Apr 1987		BS202	BS206	BS209	BRS228	ACZ253						
Z	53	12 Sep 1987	12 Sep 1987				31BE	4BE	ACZ253						
Z	54	By 22 Oct 1984	Post 22 Oct 1984			BS201	BS213	BRS227	ACZ254						
Z	54	By 13 Dec 1984	Post 18 Dec 1984			BS201	BZ267	BRS225	ACZ254						Albury, Mildura & Swan Hill
Z	54	By 27 Mar 1986	Post 27 Mar 1986			BZ268	BZ269	BRS225	ACZ254		236	179t	91m		
Z	54	By 23 Mar 1989	Post 23 Mar 1989		34BE	BS205	BRS229	BS206	ACZ254		300	211t	114m		
Z	54	By 02 Jan 1985	Post 02 Jan 1985			BS201	BZ267	BRS222	ACZ254						
Z	54	By 26 Jan 1985	Post 30 Jan 1985			BS213	BZ268	3BRS	ACZ254						
Z	54	By 20 Feb 1985	Post 20 Feb 1985			BS202	BZ267	BRS228	ACZ254						
Z	54	By 04 Mar 1985	Post 04 Mar 1985			34BE	BZ268	BRS228	ACZ254						Lose BZ267 and BS202, gain BZ268 and 34BE.
Z	54	By 04 Apr 1985	By 04 Apr 1985			34BE	BZ268	BRS228	ACZ254						
Z	54	By 13 May 1985	Post 13 May 1985			6BS	BZ268	BRS228	ACZ254						
Z	54	By 06 Oct 1985	Post 12 Oct 1985			BZ266	BZ268	BRS228	ACZ254						
Z	54	By 16 Apr 1987	Post 16 Apr 1987		4BE	34BE	BS210	BRS224	ACZ254						
Z	55	By 26 Aug 1984	Post 26 Aug 1984			BS204	3BZ	BRS224	ACZ255						
Z	55	By 23 Oct 1984	Post 17 Nov 1984			BS204	3BZ	BRS224	ACZ255						
Z	55	By 30 Nov 1984	Post Dec 1984			BS213	2BZ	3BRS	ACZ255						Albury, Mildura, Swan Hill services
Z	55	By 04 Jan 1985	Post 04 Jan 1985			BS209	BZ268	3BRS	ACZ255						
Z	55	By 02 Feb 1985	Post 22 Feb 1985			BS201	BZ270	BRS222	ACZ255						
Z	55	By 27 Mar 1986	27 Mar 1986			BS205	BS202	BRS224	ACZ255		228	171t	91m		
Z	55	28 Mar 1986	Post 28 Mar 1986			31BE	BS205	BRS224	ACZ255		236	171t	91m	BS202 faulty; BS205 shifted to Car C and BE31 pulled from E set; then BES50 ex loose replaced BE31 in its set.	
Z	55	By 23 Mar 1989	Post 23 Mar 1989			BZ270	BRS224	BZ267	ACZ255		236	171t	91m		
Z	55	By 13 Feb 1985	Post 13 Feb 1985			BS201	BZ270	BRS220 [sic]	ACZ255		236	171t	91m		
Z	55	By 02 Mar 1985	Post 02 Mar 1985			BS201	BZ270	BRS222	ACZ255		236	171t	91m		
Z	55	By 04 Apr 1985	By 04 Apr 1985			BS218	BS213	BRS224	ACZ255						
Z	56	By 12 Jan 1985	Post 12 Jan 1985			BS208	BS204	1BRS	ACZ256						Traraglon set
Z	56	By 27 Mar 1986	Post 27 Mar 1986			BS203	BS206	BRS227	ACZ256		228	171t	91m		
Z	55	By 16 Apr 1987	Post 16 Apr 1987			BZ269	BZ264	BRS230	ACZ255						
Z	56	By 17 Dec 1990	By 17 Dec 1990			BZ270	BRS227	BZ265	ACZ256		236	171t	91m		
Z	56	By 21 Mar 1985	Post 21 Mar 1985			BS208	6Z [sic]	1BRS	ACZ256						
Z	56	By 28 Mar 1985	Post 28 Mar 1985			BS202	BZ269	1BRS	ACZ256						
Z	56	By 04 Apr 1985	By 04 Apr 1985			31BE	BZ264	BRS227	ACZ256						
Z	56	By 25 Feb 1986	By 08 Mar 1986			BZ268	BZ269	BRS225	ACZ256						
Z	56	By 06 Aug 1986	Post 06 Aug 1986		34BE	4BE	BS203	BRS228	ACZ256		236	179t	91m		
Z	56	By 15 Aug 1986	Post 15 Aug 1986		BS20 [sic]	BS202	BS203	BRS228	ACZ256		236	179t	91m		
Z	56	By 16 Apr 1987	16 Apr 1987			BS213	BS204	BRS223	ACZ256						Spare set.
Z	56	17 Apr 1987	Post 17 Apr 1987		BS212	BS213	BS204	BRS223	ACZ256					Gain BS212	Spare set. Position of car BS212 not clear. BS204 sighted being transferred to Ballarat separately on 2 June 1987.
Z	56	14 Aug 1987	16 Aug 1987			BZ267	BZ269	BRS227	ACZ256						
Z	57	By 19 Dec 1985	19 Dec 1985			BZ270	BZ267	BRS221	ACZ257						
Z	57	By 30 Nov 1985	30 Nov 1985			BZ267	BZ270	BRS221	ACZ257						
Z	57	By 10 Mar 1986	By 10 Mar 1986		BS206	BS204	BS211	BRS227	ACZ257						
Z	57	By 04 Mar 1986	Post 27 Mar 1986			BZ270	BZ266	BRS226	ACZ257		236	179t	91m		
Z	57	By 06 Aug 1986	Post 06 Aug 1986			BZ264	BZ269	BRS221	ACZ257		236	179t	91m		
Z	57	By 16 Apr 1987	Post 16 Apr 1987						ACZ257						Set not assembled. Other spare cars included BRS221, BZ270, BS212 and 51AE. BS212 noted hauled from Ballarat to Melbourne on night of 16th, then attached to Z56. 51AE was in Spencer Street yard. Other three cars' locations not recorded.
Z	57	By 23 Mar 1989	Post 23 Mar 1989				BZ266	BRS228	ACZ257		168	135t	69m		
Z	57	By 16 Dec 1990	By 16 Dec 1990				BZ267	BRS228	ACZ257		236	171t	91m		Was running with SJ282-SJ284 west end, D316-VMAP7-VMAP10 west end
Z	58	By 09 Mar 1985	Post 09 Mar 1985			BS211	BZ270	BRS222	ACZ258						
Z	58	By 04 Apr 1985	Post 04 Apr 1985						ACZ258						Not a formal set. Other spare carriages at the time were AS2306, 1AK, BRS225 and BRS230, BZ265, BZ266, BZ201, BS203, SS285 and SS286, and timber cars 4BE and Sleepers 1, 2, 3 and 4.
Z	58	By 16 Apr 1985	Post 16 Apr 1985			BZ267	BZ270	BRS222	ACZ258						Lose BS211, gain BZ267
Z	58	By 16 Aug 1985	Post 16 Aug 1985			BZ267	BZ270	BRS224	ACZ258						Lose BRS222, gain BRS224
Z	58	By 27 Mar 1986	Post 27 Mar 1986		BS212	BS201	BS209	BRS230	ACZ258		292	211t	114m		
Z	58	By 16 Apr 1987	Post 16 Apr 1987		19BE	BS203	BS205	BRS225	ACZ258						
Z	58	By 23 Mar 1989	Post 23 Mar 1989			BZ269	BRS221	BZ265	ACZ258		236	171t	91m		
Z	59	By 09 Apr 1997	Post 09 Apr 1997		BCZ258H	BCZ251H	BS216H	BS217H	ACZ259H						
Z	60	By 11 Sep 1986	Post 11 Sep 1986				BS205	BRS227	ACZ260		300	211t	114m		ACZ260 entered service ex 2VBK on Thursday 27 March 1986, following a downturn in interstate traffic making it available for conversion to broad gauge. It was painted in V/Line orange with green and white stripes.
Z	60	By 16 Apr 1987	Post 30 Jun 1987				BZ265	BRS229	ACZ260						
Z	60	By 23 Mar 1989	Post 23 Mar 1989		19BE	BS204	BRS223	BS211	ACZ260		300	211t	114m		
Z	62	By 31 Mar 1986	By 31 Mar 1986			BZ267	BZ265	BRS228	ACZ262						ACZ262 entered service ex 4VBK on Thursday 13 March 1986, following a downturn in interstate traffic making it available for conversion to broad gauge. It was painted in V/Line orange with green and white stripes.
Z	62	By 27 Mar 1986	Post 27 Mar 1986			BZ267	BZ265	BRS228	ACZ262		236	179t	91m		
Z	62	By 16 Apr 1987	Post 16 Apr 1987		BS211	BS208	BS201	BRS226	ACZ262						
Z	62	By 30 Jun 1987	Post 30 Jun 1987				BZ270	BRS227 (Note: Source says BRS272)	ACZ262						
Z	62	By 21 Sep 1987	Post 21 Sep 1987				4BE	1BG	ACZ262						Three-car set with no buffet facility due to carriage shortage. Train from Melbourne to Traralgon had standing passengers at least to Warragul.
Z	62	By 23 Mar 1989	Post 24 Mar 1989				BS212	BRS225	ACZ262		164	131t	68m		
Z	62	By 15 Apr 1990	Post 15 Apr 1990		BS206	BS208	BRS221	BS211	ACZ262		292	211t	114m		

As at 1 August 1987, cars painted in the V/Line livery with white and green stripes were ACZ252, 260 and 262, BZ264, 265, 266 and 269, BS201, 202, 203, BRS221, 222, 230, VBK259 on standard gauge, and van CP291. VBK259 had only recently been repainted, having first been sighted at South Dynon in the new livery on 25 July 1987.

Unlike the H and N sets, the Z sets were usually labelled just as Z with the number, regardless of the number of cars in the set. Letter prefixes to indicate the number of carriages, e.g. VZ for a five-car set, were only identified as such from about 2004.

As the Z sets were dissolved, their carriages were converted to BZN or BTN cars for inclusion in N sets. As at July 1997, there were seven FN type sets with a BZN included in their consist, plus two VN sets with a BZ and BCZ, and one Z set, Z59. Additionally, one ACZ and three BCZ cars were spares, not allocated to active sets.

When West Coast Railway purchased cars from V/Line to operate their Warrnambool service, they acquired ACZ252, ACZ255, ACZ257, BZ267, BZ269 and BZ270. Initially the V/Line logos were covered with white "W" decals, and after the sale was completed on 9 April 1995, the cars were repainted into that company's blue scheme.

==== V/Line Passenger sets ====
When V/Line services were restored from Ballarat to Ararat the Sprinter roster needed to be adapted, and a chain reaction from that caused V/Line to re-marshal their Z type carriages into two new Z sets. These entered service on 27 August 2003. The new sets were sequenced as 1, 2 and later 3, overlapping with the N sets, rather than the original system which would have used the number of the ACZ car to define the set number. The first two sets did not incorporate any S type carriages; the third set briefly did. Notably, none of these sets ever featured buffet cars. They were strictly intended for commuter use, rather than long-distance regional travel. Sets were typically five Z type carriages, though occasionally one would be removed if required.

By late 2005 both VZ sets had been reduced to four carriages; each maintained an ACZ, BZN and BTN.

The VZ sets were dissolved as part of the program to convert the ACZ, BCZ and BZ cars to BZN configuration, which was necessary to provide wheelchair accommodation on the N type sets. The program started with BZ267, which developed a bogie fault on 12 March 2007 and was sent to the workshops ahead of schedule. It had been the last carriage in V/Line's fleet to be fitted with drop toilets. Other planned conversions were BCZ252, BCZ257, BCZ259 and BCZ262, but BCZ257 and BCZ259 were not converted. BCZ257 remained in its ex-West Coast Rail configuration through to final retirement in 2023, while BCZ259 was converted to BTN format in 2013.

It is not clear when ACZ257 and ACZ259 was downgraded to BCZ classification, though photos show ACZ259 on 15 May 2006, recoded to BCZ259 on 23 June 2006. Similarly, carriage "CZ257" was photographed on 1 August 2006 (with the "A" class prefix removed), and BCZ257 ten days later.

BZN258 and BTN254 were the last Z type carriages to undergo repainting in the red livery, being outshopped on 4 and 16 October 2007 respectively. BZN252 was outshopped on 22 October 2007 painted in the V/Line Passenger Mark III grey livery, and attached to set N5 (which was still red at the time), followed by converted and repainted BZN267 on 27 November 2007.

When the VZ sets were dissolved their carriages were distributed to the N type sets, increasing those from three and four to four and five carriages. Each broad gauge set was given one BZN or BCZ, and the seven remaining BTNs were used to make that many five-car VN sets. A new V/Line timetable at the end of August 2007 added 76 seats each to the 7:49 am Down and 1:00 pm Up Swan Hill services, the 6:22 am Up and 5:24 pm Down Bacchus Marsh services, and the 5 49am Up and 5:47 pm Down Marshall services.

Later, following the Kerang train accident, withdrawn S cars BS215 to BS219 inclusive would be returned to service, initially with ACN21 as set SN7 and later with BCZ257 as set Z57 (sometimes referred to erroneously known as SZ7). ACZ252, which had been stored with the BS cars in December 2006, was converted to BZN252 around February 2007.

When set Z57 was dissolved in 2010 the five BS carriages were retired, and BCZ257 was attached to an N set to act in place of a BZN car.

Code	Set No.	From	To	Car F	Car E	Car D	Car C	Car B	Car A (East end)	Van	Capacity	Weight	Length	Changes to achieve	Notes
VZ	1	27 Aug 2003	By 26 Nov 2005		BTN254	BTN253	BZN256	BTN251	ACZ259		52 1st class, 340 Economy, 2 wheelchair				
VZ	2	27 Aug 2003	By 26 Nov 2005		BTN268	BTN264	BZN261	BTN263	ACZ262		52 1st class, 340 Economy, 2 wheelchair				
VZ	1	By 26 Nov 2005	By 15 May 2006			BTN251	BZN256	BTN253	ACZ259	D335	52 1st class, 252 Economy, 2 wheelchair, 25 tonnes			Lose BTN254	
VZ	2	By 26 Nov 2005	By 22 Oct 2007			BZN261	BS216	BTN268	ACZ262		52 1st class, 228 Economy, 2 wheelchair			Lose BTN263 and BTN264; gain BS216 formerly spare	
Z	3	By 11 Nov 2004	Possibly by 28 Nov 2005; definitely by 12 March 2007				BS215	BZ267	ACZ257	PCO2	52 1st class, 128 Economy, 2 wheelchair, 10 tonnes				PCO, ACZ and BZ ex West Coast Railway. ACZ257 wheelchair accessible west end door. May have been scheduled for use on Ballarat services.
Z	57	29 Mar 2009	08 Aug 2010	BS217	BS219	BS216	BS218	BS215	BCZ257		372 Economy, 2 wheelchair	283.7t	137m	Power doors fitted on entry to service.	Sometimes referred to as SZ7 because all the remaining V/Line S type carriages were included in the consist, and the set had six carriages. This would be a precursor to SSH/SLH six-car H sets, but in the short term it would conflict with the S prefix of standard gauge N sets. First run was #8231 1655 Spencer Street to Marshall. BS carriages taken from set SN7, when ACN21 was withdrawn for conversion to BDN21 on 1,435 mm (4 ft 8 1/2 in) services to Albury, New South Wales. BCZ257 was rotated with the van compartment adjacent BS215, rather than at the east end.

=== Status as of early 2018 ===
All Z type carriages in service with V/Line were converted to BCZ, BZN or BTN format, though some were stored at Newport Workshops awaiting repaired bogies. They were used to bolster capacity of thirteen 5 ft 3 in (1,600 mm) gauge N sets 3–6, 9–14, 17–19 inclusive as fourth and fifth carriages. N sets SN1, SN15, SN16 and (from mid-2018) SN8 were on 1,435 mm (4 ft 8 1/2 in) gauge, exclusively operating with N type carriages; and sets N2 and N7 were dissolved to provide carriages to form those. The only exception was PZ260, formerly ACZ260, used as a standard gauge power van.

==== Original AZ carriages ====
- BTN251 – Set VN10 from January 2017.
  - Previous allocations: Z59 (5-car) as BCZ251H at 1997-04-09
- BZN252 – Set FN13 from January 2017.
  - Previous allocations: Set FN10 from September 2016.
- BTN253 – Set VN18 from January 2017.
  - Previous allocations: Set VN17. Was a loose car (BCZ253T) at 1997-04-09
- BTN254 – Stored at Newport Workshops, awaiting new bogies. Will proceed to set VN14.
  - Previous allocations: FN18 circa 2008–2012; FN3 circa 2007; N17 (5-car) as BCZ254H at 1997-04-09
- BZN256 – Set VN3 (formerly FN3).
- BCZ257 – Set VN19 from January 2017.
  - Previous allocations: Set FN9 from January 2016. Was coupled to FN6 for a time, but not officially part of the consist. Was given to 707 Operations in early 2023.
- BZN258 – Stored at Newport Workshops, awaiting new bogies. Will proceed to set VN14.
  - Previous allocations: VN17 circa 2001–2015; Z59 (5-car) as BCZ258H at 1997-04-09
- BTN259 – Set VN6 from January 2017.
  - Previous allocations: Set VN12. Z59 (5-car) as ACZ259H at 1997-04-09
- ACZ260 – Modified and reclassed as PZ260
- BZN261 – Set VN17
  - Previous allocations: Set FN3, N4 (5-car) as BCZ261H at 1997-04-09 West end was damaged in shunting side-swipe in morning of Wednesday 20 August 1997.
- BZN262 – Stored at Newport Workshops, awaiting new bogies. Will proceed to set VN10.
  - Previous allocations: FN3 from 2008, and FN5 circa 2010. Was a loose car (ACZ262H) at 1997-04-09
- BTN263 – Set VN17
  - Previous allocations: Set FN14, as third carriage substituting for damaged BN car. FN12 as BCZ263H at 1997-04-09

==== Original BZ carriages ====
- BTN264 – Set VN3.
  - Previous allocations: Set FN14, N4 (5-car) as BZ264H at 1997-04-09
- BZN265 – Set FN9.
  - Previous allocations: Set FN19. Was a loose car (BZN265H) at 1997-04-09
- BZN266 – Set VN5 (was FN5).
  - Previous allocations: N17 (5-car) as BZ266H at 1997-04-09
- BZN267 – Set FN4
  - Previous allocations: Set FN14 late 2016. Set FN4 from 2009.
- BTN268 – Workshops. Will go to VN11.
  - Previous allocations: Set FN13. Set FN10 temporarily in August 2016.
- BZN271H – Set VN19.
  - Previous allocations: Set FN11 from 2013. FN1 at 1997-04-09
- BZN272H – Set VN12.
  - Previous allocations: FN10 circa 1995; N9 (4-car) at 1997-04-09
- BZN273H – Set VN10.
  - Previous allocations: Set FN19 in 2016, FN15 at 1997-04-09
- BZN274H – Set VN6 (was FN6).
  - Previous allocations: Was a loose car (BZN274H) at 1997-04-09
- BZN275H – Set FN18 from 2016.
  - Previous allocations: FN19 circa 1995 through 1997.
- BZN276H – Set VN11.
  - Previous allocations: Set VN17 until c. 20 October 2016, FN10 circa 1995–1997, also in 2007 and 2016 (temporarily withdrawn during bogie issues).

=== Status as of early 2025 ===
By post-New Deal codes. 251–263 are ex-AZ/ACZ/VBK, 264–276 are ex-BZ/VFK, 287 is ex-SZ/VAM.

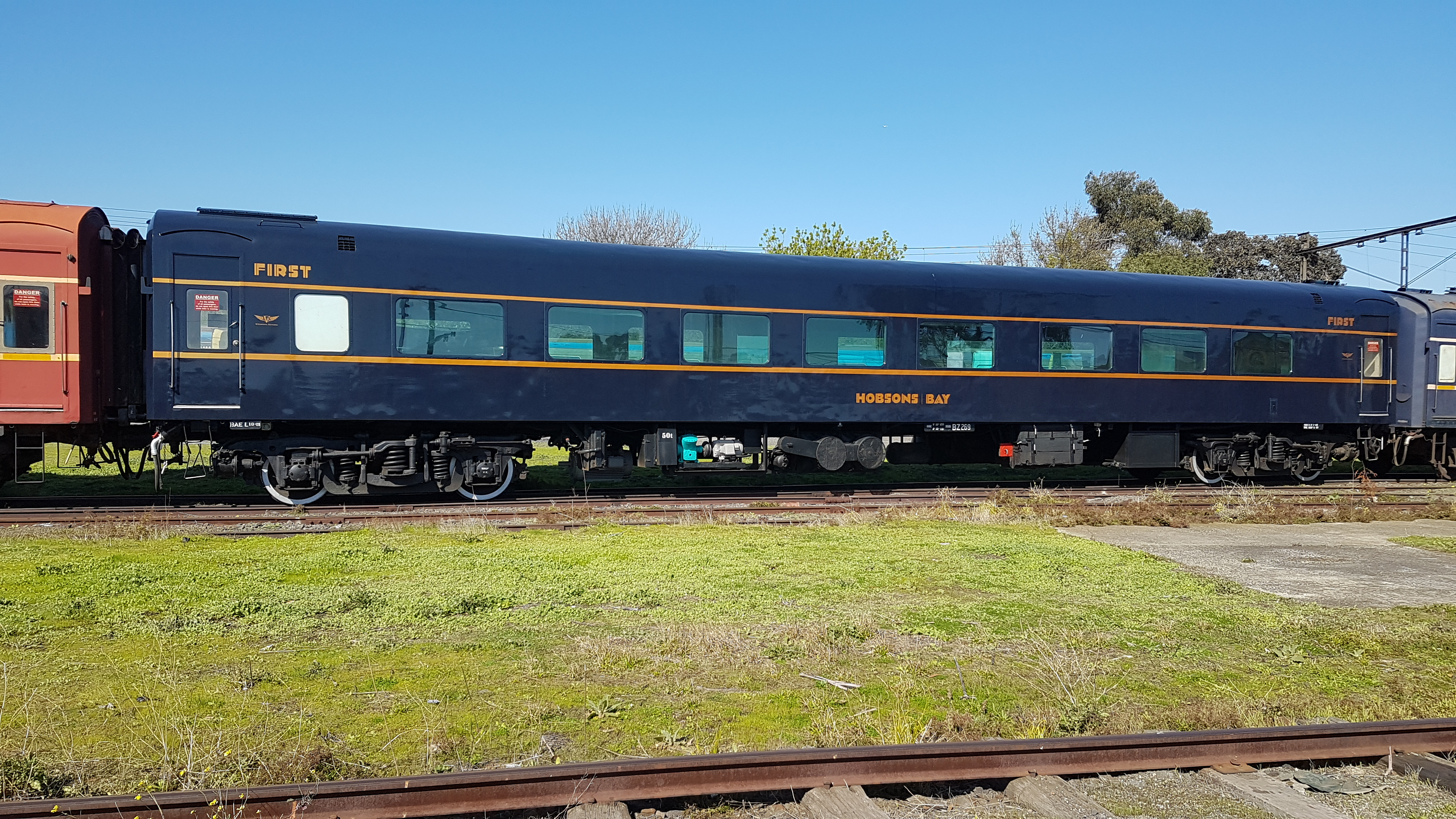
BZ269 at Newport Workshops

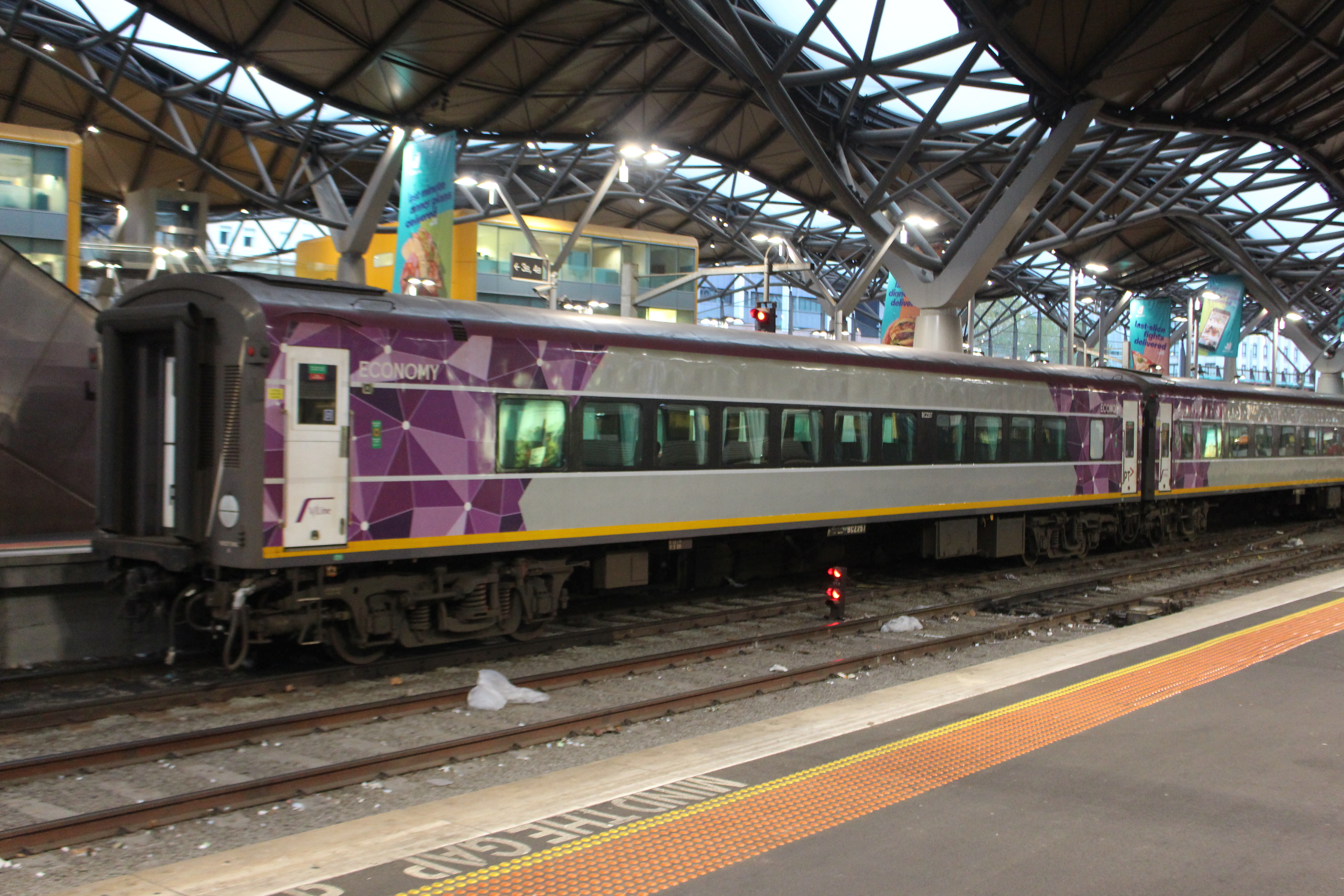
BCZ257 at Southern Cross on Platform 4

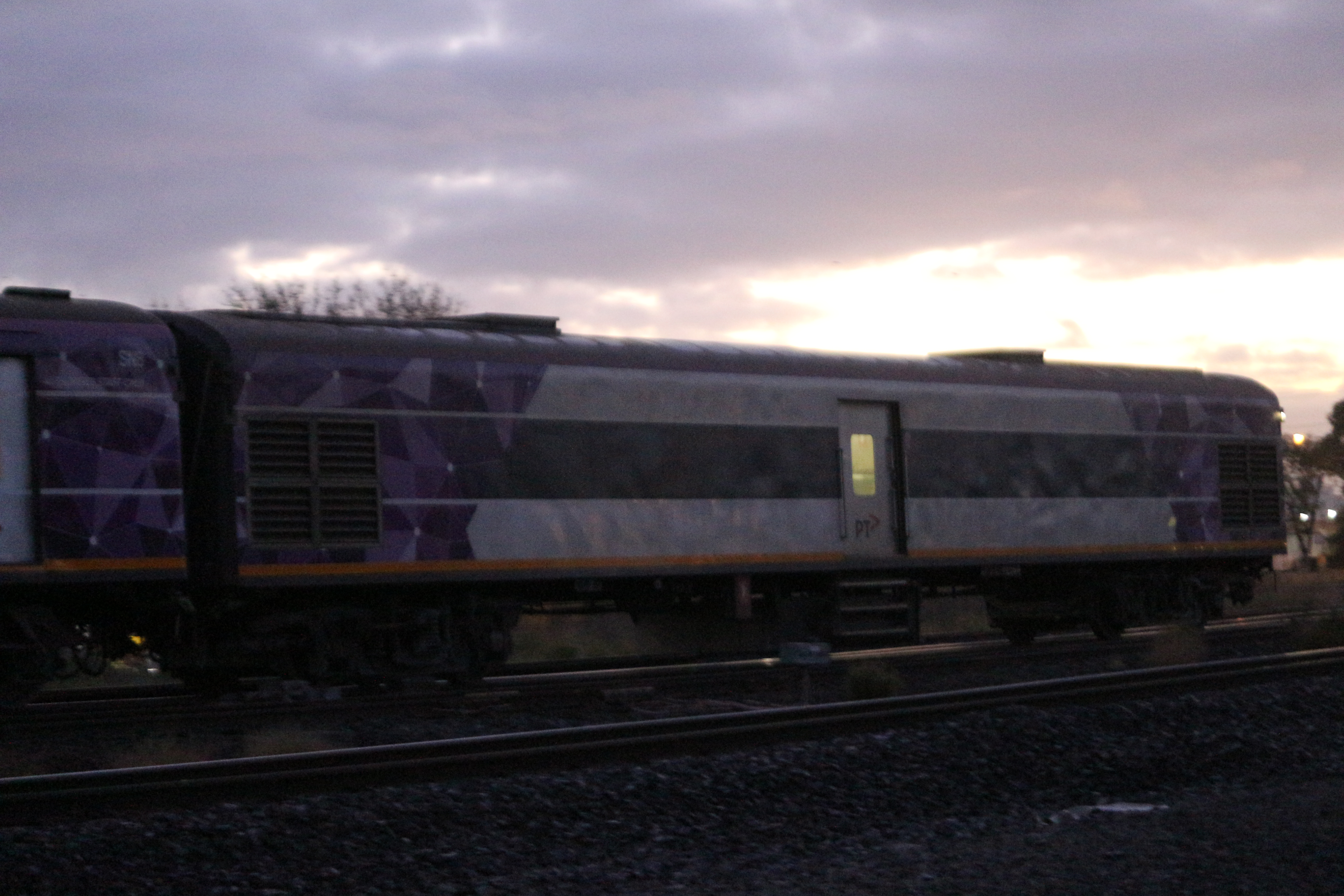
PZ260

As at September 2024, 16 remained in service with V/Line.

- In service, V/Line Passenger: BTN 251, 253; BZN 252, 258, 261, 262, 265, 266, 267, 271, 272, 273, 274, 275, 276
- Preserved, 707 Operations: ACZ 255; ACZ 257; BTN 259; BZ 270
- Preserved, Seymour Railway Heritage Centre: BTN 264; VAM 1 (ex VAM/SZ287); PZ 10 (ex ACZ260)
- Preserved, Victorian Goldfields Railway: BTN 263, 268; BZN 256
- Preserved, Steamrail Victoria: BZ 269

By 18 March 2025, V/Line had removed most of the locomotive-hauled fleet from their register. The circular advising the change listed nine Z type carriages, though the list does not match prior classes. It mentions BCZ260, BTN263, 264 and 268, and BZN 253, 256, 267, 272 and 275 as removed. If the codes are ignored and only the numbers are considered, this indicates 253, 267, 272 and 275 as the withdrawals following removal of locomotive-hauled trains from the Warrnambool corridor.

On the night of 29 May 2025, twelve N type carriages, along with BZN261 and BZN271, were authorised for transferred from Newport Workshops to North Bendigo Workshops in a transfer by Southern Shorthaul Railroad, having been withdrawn from V/Line service.
