= The Gippslander =

Overview
- First service: 22 July 1954
- Current operator: Victorian Railways

Route
- Service frequency: Daily except Sundays
- Train numbers: 21 Down / 30 Up (1966); 8421 Down / 8450 or 8452 Up (1978); 8407 Down / 8432 Up (1989)

On-board services
- Catering facilities: Buffet car

Technical
- Track gauge: 5 ft 3 in (1,600 mm)

== History ==
The Gippslander was an Australian named passenger train operated by the Victorian Railways from Melbourne through the Gippsland region to Bairnsdale. Operating along the Gippsland line daily except Sundays, the train was air-conditioned and had buffet car facilities provided.

During World War II, the daily return Bairnsdale service was unofficially referred to as the Bairnsdale Bomber by military staff at the RAAF East Sale airbase. The service was drastically improved on 17 November 1952, with the introduction of a new, faster roster, utilising a B Class locomotive hauling a mix of wooden-bodied, air-conditioned first- and second-class carriages and a buffet car, with additional carriages provided as required by patronage offering. The first train was hauled by locomotive B64, and the return trip schedule about four hours faster overall.

From 24 July 1954, the wooden-bodied sitting carriages were replaced with steel-bodied AS and BS compartment carriages. From that date, the train was scheduled to depart Flinders Street Station daily except Sundays at 8:35am. The Down trip to Bairnsdale stopped at Caulfield to pick up passengers, Warragul, Moe, Morwell and Traralgon, then all stations to Bairnsdale, except Loy Yang and Montgomery, arriving at 1:42pm. On the return trip, departure from Bairnsdale was at 2:35pm, stopping all stations to Traralgon, except Montgomery and Loy Yang, then running express to Warragul and Caulfield, the latter to set-down passengers only, terminating at Flinders Street.

The train was officially named on 11 October 1954 to celebrate the electrification of the main line as far Warragul, 66 years after the passenger service had commenced along the line. It used an L class electric locomotive from Melbourne to Warragul, from where an R class steam locomotive took over for the journey to Sale, with the final leg to Bairnsdale hauled by a J class steam locomotive. When electrification and L Class-haulage was extended to Traralgon in March 1956, steam traction on the service was replaced by T class diesel locomotives for the remainder of the trip to Bairnsdale.

By April 1958, the first-class AS compartment car had been replaced with a saloon type AZ, and the second-class BS car was replaced later.

From 12 February 1962, buffet car Tanjil was withdrawn from the train and replaced by dining car Avoca. Tanjil would go on to be converted to standard gauge as buffet car 3VRS for the Spirit of Progress service, then extended to Sydney.

The 2 May 1966 Working Time Table specified The Gippslander as trains 21 Down, departing Flinders Street station at 8:35am and arrived Bairnsdale 1:20pm, returning as train 30 Up departing 2:10pm for a 6:50pm arrival. The train was scheduled to operate via the Local lines between Flinders Street "E" Box and Caulfield on the outbound trip, but diverting to the Up Through line for the return; and use of Automatic Staff Exchanging Apparatus equipment at Bunyip and Longwarry in both directions. The train was permitted to convey passenger luggage to Warragul, Moe, Morwell and Traralgon, but regular parcels to these locations were required to travel via other services; the same applied on the return trip. Stops were at Caulfield, Dandenong, Warragul, Moe, Morwell and Traralgon, then Rosedale, Kilmany if required, Sale, Stratford, Munro (if required, Fridays only), Fernbank, Lindenow, Hillside if required and Bairnsdale. Two minutes were provided at Warragul and eight minutes each at Traralgon and Sale, with fifty minutes between arrival and departure at Bairnsdale.

The train composition in 1966 was, from the east end at Flinders Street, locomotive-CE-AZ-BUFFET-BZ, plus BW-AW-BCE on Mondays (325 tons / 100 1st plus 166 2nd class seats), plus ABE-BCE on Tuesdays, Wednesdays, Thursdays and Saturdays (300 tons / 86 1st plus 142 2nd class seats), or plus AW-BW-ABE-BCE on Fridays (370 tons / 126 1st plus 202 2nd class seats). In all cases, the rear two cars were detached at Traralgon and reattached at the same end on the return trip. Given the reversal of the train and quick turnaround necessary at Sale, a special instruction was issued allowing operation without a brakevan at the rear of the train between Traralgon - Sale - Bairnsdale, conditional on the trailing vehicle having a handbrake in good condition and a Conductor riding in the rear carriage, acting as the Guard and performing assorted safe-working duties. The Guard of the train would remain in the brakevan at the leading end of the train, and was exempted from the duties specified for the Conductor under these conditions.

The 21st anniversary of the Gippslander's operation was celebrated on 22 July 1975, with the train hauled by L1166. On 1 March 1976, administration of seat reservations for the Melbourne-bound trip was transferred from Bairnsdale to the Central Reservations Bureau in Melbourne.

By 1979, the train schedule had been updated to Number 8421 with 9am departure from Flinders Street for a 1:15pm arrival at Bairnsdale daily except Saturdays; and the return trip 8450 departing Bairnsdale 2:10pm for 6:20pm arrival weekdays, or number 8452 running 2:20pm to 6:30pm Saturdays. An additional note was added that the train might not connect with the Spirit of Progress during holiday periods. Stops were the same as far as Traralgon, then Rosedale, Sale, Stratford, Fernbank, Lindenow and Bairnsdale every day, with no extra conditions. However, the restriction on goods conveyed by the train was slightly altered, with permission granted for the Melbourne-bound trip to also carry "urgent perishables Van Goods, and live animals/birds from Warragul". At that time, the consist was reduced to BCE-BZ-Buffet-AZ-CE (Mondays to Thursdays; 260 tons / 56 1st plus 110 2nd class seats) and BCE-ABE-BZ-Buffet-AZ-CE (Friday to Saturday; 306 tons / 82 1st plus 146 2nd class seats), with the BCE detached from the rear at Traralgon, and reattached on the return trip. Notably, both the 1981 and 1986 photos below show the BCE at the leading end of the down train.

On and after 4 October 1981, the introduction of the "New Deal for Country Passengers" saw the Gippslander extended from Flinders Street to Spencer Street station, and running was extended to Sundays. The down train was sighted at Traralgon on 8 July 1981 with the consist L1151-24CE-6AZ-Moorabool-3BZ-41BU-5BCE. On arrival, the locomotive was replaced by T397-T379. The return trip was hauled by T397 to Traralgon then L1151, with T379 having been left in the yard at Bairnsdale. A substitute consist was noted on Tuesday 27 July 1982, with the down trip being L1161-VBPY11-1BCE-12AS-1BG-16BE. Also on that, day the locomotive failed shortly after passing Morwell and the train was rescued by T401 running from Traralgon, where it otherwise would have replaced the L Class. Despite arriving Traralgon nearly 35 minutes late, the train was only 16 minutes behind time on arrival at Bairnsdale, with ample time to turn around in time for the scheduled departure.

== Post-electrification ==
After the decommissioning of the overhead electrification system on the Gippsland line in the 1980s, a variety of diesel locomotives hauled the train. The October 1983 carriage roster (N18) showed two sets allocated for Bairnsdale trains, these being Rosters 21 and 22, each made up as BCE-AZ-Buffet-BS-BE(air-conditioned). On alternate weekdays each set ran daily from Geelong to Melbourne, formed the Gippslander to Bairnsdale and back to Spencer Street, then turned around for the afternoon Sale trip (extended to Bairnsdale on Friday nights), while the other set started from Sale, ran to Geelong, back to Spencer Street then terminated at Geelong. For weekends, the Friday night arrival at Bairnsdale ran back to Melbourne then Traralgon and Geelong on Saturday, then to Bairnsdale and back to Geelong on Sunday, while the other set ran from Geelong through Melbourne to Bairnsdale, back to Spencer Street then out to Sale on Saturday, and stabled at Sale on Sunday. A few months later the next roster (N19, 1 April 1984) showed similar workings, with Roster 21 and 22 alternating between Geelong-Bairnsdale-Melbourne-Bairnsdale and Bairnsdale-Geelong-Melbourne-Geelong trips on weekdays, Roster 21 running Saturday's Geelong-Bairnsdale-Melbourne-Bairnsdale then stabling at Bairnsdale on Sunday, and Roster 22 as Bairnsdale-Melbourne-Traralgon-Melbourne on Saturday then Melbourne-Bairnsdale-Geelong on Sunday. At this time one set was made up as CE-AZ-BRS-BS-BE(a/c), pending conversion of an additional ACZ.

Prior to 9 December 1984, the consist had been one each ACZ, BRS, BS and wooden air-conditioned BE; after this date the latter car had been replaced by a second BS. Newsrail records two consists in use in November 1984, these being Z51 (ACZ251-BRS228-3BS-19BE, later ACZ251-BRS228-51AE-12BS) and Z53 (ACZ253-BRS-7BS-1BG, altered to ACZ253-BRS230-BS204-34BE by Sunday 25 November, and 34BE replaced by 1BG shortly thereafter.) Carriage Roster H3, in use from 14 April 1985, combined the Bairnsdale and Geelong rosters 21 to 24 with four sets of ACZ-BRS-BS-BS. Set 21 ran Geelong-Bairnsdale-Melbourne-Bairnsdale Monday to Saturday, and Melbourne-Bairnsdale-Geelong on Sunday; this was balanced by Set 22 Bairnsdale-Geelong-Melbourne-South Geelong-Melbourne-Warrnambool weekdays, Bairnsdale-Melbourne-Traralgon Saturdays and stabling Bairnsdale Sundays, and sets 23 and 24 covering assorted Geelong, South Geelong and Warrnambool trips. Similar workings were utilised in the following roster H4, though other changes resulted in roster 24 swapping one of its weekday Geelong return trips for a Ballarat run.

In 1986, two of the rostered sets (ACZ-BRS-BS-BS) allocated for Gippslander and Geelong services were increased from four to five cars by adding an additional BS carriage to each. This resulted in the split of Rosters 21-22 from 23-24; set 21 now ran South Geelong-Bairnsdale-Melbourne-Bairnsdale weekdays, Warrnambool-Melbourne Saturdays and Melbourne-Bairnsdale-Melbourne-Bairnsdale Sundays, and set 22 Bairnsdale-Geelong-Geelong Monday to Wednesday, Bairnsdale-Geelong Thursday, Bairnsdale-Warrnambool Friday, Melbourne-Bairnsdale Saturday and Melbourne-Dimboola-Melbourne then empty to Geelong on Sundays.

New timetables introduced in October 1986 and February 1987 saw the issue of roster CW2, with the Bairnsdale trips shifted to runs 25 and 26 with sets ACZ-BRS-BZ-BZ in response to changing demand, no new carriage deliveries planned, and suburban trains extending from Pakenham to Warragul reducing demand on LaTrobe Valley services (including the Gippslander). This marked the reintroduction of BZ second class saloon cars to The Gippslander for the first time in five years. Under the new roster, Run 25 operated from South Geelong to Melbourne, then working the return Gippslander to Bairnsdale and the afternoon Bairnsdale service on weekdays, then the Saturday Bairnsdale to Melbourne and two Geelong return trips, and a service from Mildura on Sundays. Run 9 (ACN-BRN-BN) worked Sunday morning and Monday evening trips from Bairnsdale, covering for Run 26 which otherwise worked the balancing Tuesday-Friday from Bairnsdale to South Geelong trip, plus Geelong, Mildura and Swan Hill runs across the week.

By 11 October 1987, the roster had been drastically altered, with Gippslander trips spread across rosters 5 (Saturdays, ACN-BRN-BN), 21 (Sundays, ACZ-BRS-BS-BS-BS) and 25 (Weekdays, ACZ-BRS-BZ-BZ), mixed in with other services to South Geelong and interfacing with rosters 1, 9 and 26 that also operated to and from Bairnsdale. Another roster was implemented on 8 May 1988, with various cascading changes resulting in N-class carriages being used exclusively on the Gippslander: Run 12 ran weekdays, Run 5 on Saturdays, and Runs 4 and 12 combined ran Sundays for a double-length consist. That roster also showed the weekday Gippslander departing Melbourne at 7:54am.

In 1989, the Avon River bridge at Stratford was reinforced, and a trial run of the Gippslander hauled by locomotive A77 to Bairnsdale was performed on 25 August 1989. From 4 September 1989 some A and N class locomotives were formally permitted to operate over the bridge, and by 13 December 1989 the whole of both fleets were authorised, so locomotive swaps to the lighter T Class engines at Traralgon were no longer required.

On 20 August 1993, the final Gippslander service ran to Bairnsdale, with road coaches replacing trains beyond Sale. The following passenger train was impounded by the local community at Bairnsdale and not released until a few days after. After that, the Gippslander only operated to and from Sale. On 2 May 2004, services were restored to Bairnsdale, including the Gippslander.

== Modern era ==
The Gippslander name continued in use for V/Line intercity services on the line, but no special facilities were provided beyond the standard buffet module. From 26 August 2018, most Bairnsdale passenger trains, including morning outbound and afternoon inbound trips, were replaced by standard VLocity sets, which lacked the buffet facilities previously available. The name did not appear on the 1 December 2019 public timetable, although it may have been discontinued earlier.
