= Victorian Railways motor car transport =

Motor car transport
- Manufacturer: Victorian Railways
- Built at: Newport Workshops; Bendigo Workshops
- Constructed: From 1958
- Number built: 22 (AA), 58 (ALF)
- Number scrapped: 2
- Lines served: Melbourne to Mildura, Adelaide & Sydney; Various freight routes

Specifications
- Car length: 58 feet 9 inches (17.91 m) (short); 75 feet 10 inches (23.11 m) (long)
- Width: 9 feet 8 inches (2.95 m)
- Height: 14 feet 0 inches (4.27 m) (loaded)
- Maximum speed: 60 mph (97 km/h) (except AA class)
- Track gauge: 5 ft 3 in (1,600 mm) and 4 ft 8 1/2 in (1,435 mm) standard gauge

The Victorian Railways and successors used a variety of railway wagons for the transport motor cars.

== History ==
When the need arose for a form of motor car transportation between Melbourne and Adelaide in 1958, a new vehicle class was created. Previous to this, cars had typically been lifted by crane and secured on flat wagons, but this method of loading was slow and wasted a lot of space.

The wagon entered a two-year trial period, and in 1960 the wagon was modified to permit roll-on roll-off loading and unloading. By 1961, the class had expanded to 22 members over two batches. Later wagons were built to altered, extended designs, and coded ALF, later ALX or ALP, with the "L" indicating the increased capacity and the final letter indicating the bogie type - F for freight trains, X for freight but convertible to standard gauge for runs to Sydney, and P for passenger trains at 70 mph.

The early usage of the wagon was for carrying finished motor cars from Melbourne to Sydney and Adelaide. The Ford plant at Broadmeadows was one major source of the traffic, with Holden being the other between Melbourne and Adelaide. This traffic ended by the 1990s and the wagons were put into storage.

The other traffic was the motorail service provided to passengers on long distance trains, allowing them to bring their car along with them. From the 1970s wagons were assigned to The Vinelander from Melbourne to Mildura, with additional wagons used on the Southern Aurora between Melbourne and Sydney and The Overland between Melbourne and Adelaide. All have since ceased.

== Variants ==
=== 'Short' wagons ===
The first car-carrying wagon explicitly designed by the Victorian Railways for this purpose was constructed in 1958. The wagon was built by recycling the underframe of a scrapped Swing Door type locomotive-hauled carriage, with skeletal truss sides supporting an upper level deck. The frame, constructed in 1902 as part of 1st class passenger carriage 4A^{A}, was recoded 3A in the 1910 recoding then 144B in 1927, when better quality 1st class carriages had been made available. The new wagon had a capacity of three typical vehicles on each deck.

In 1960 the wagon was modified to permit roll-on roll-off loading and unloading, and by 1961 a further 21 wagons of the type had entered service. These wagons, which were 58 feet 9 inches (17.91 m) in length, were built at Newport Workshops and received the code 'AA'. Closed in sides were later added to the wagons. Subsequent bogie modifications saw these wagons recoded to 'AF' in 1961 and then to 'AX' between 1963-1965.

Between 1969 and 1972 the underframes were strengthened. Some records mention 'new underframe' in the modifications but observation of the same vehicles much later still showed the extensions that took place when the underframes were used for Swingdoors. The modifications appear to have been new end sills and strengthened centre beams.

In the early 1970s, six wagons (2, 8, 9, 11, 17 and 20) were allocated to 'Motorail' service between Melbourne and Mildura on the overnight passenger train. They were painted dark blue with white lettering, to suit the livery of The Vinelander. The other 16 vehicles were on standard gauge in freight motor car traffic between Melbourne and Sydney.

With the introduction of Railways of Australia four letter codes in 1979 the class was recoded VMAX (except 8 and 17, as VMAY). In 1980, the Motorail wagons were reclassed to VMAY, bringing this class up to six wagons with as new bogies were fitted to wagons 2, 9, 11 and 20. In 1981 the VMAY wagons were painted in V/Line's tangerine livery. Over the course of 1985 these six wagons were recoded to VMAP series 5-10, though four of the vehicles spent a few months with the short-lived code VMPY.

In 1991 the remaining 16 wagons were in storage, and VMAX 7 and VMAX 15 were scrapped in 1993.

=== 'Long' wagons ===
The 75 feet 10 inches (23.11 m) long motorail wagons were built at either the Newport Workshops or Bendigo Workshops from 1962, to a standard design as agreed with the South Australian and New South Wales Railways. The wagons were much like their shorter counterparts, with roll-on and roll-off ramps and track connectors and skeletal truss sides

Twenty-two members of the new class were ordered at first. Wagons 1-8 were delivered as class ALF, but later wagons were fitted with bogie exchange equipment from new. The older wagons were refitted and recoded between 1963-1965. These wagons were all fitted with side sheets.

The main traffic was between the car manufacturing plants in capital cities; for example, from the 'Ford' plant in Melbourne to Sydney where cars were then distributed to dealers. The vehicles were fitted with 'Track connectors', which when folded down for loading allowed vehicles to drive from one wagon to another. These 'car trains' were loaded as complete train units.

The main traffic was between the car manufacturing plants in capital cities; one such run on the standard gauge was from the Ford plant in Melbourne's northern suburb of Upfield, to Sydney where cars were then distributed to dealers.

Twenty more motor car transports were built in 1964, and these were known as the MLX, nos. 1-20. They were of a similar design to the ALF/ALX fleet, but with exposed skeletal sides and two parallel sheet steel strips along each side. Each level could take up to five vehicles or six vehicle bodies, depending on the length and method of loading. The class was used to transport incomplete Holden cars between Melbourne and Adelaide. In 1967 the class was renumbered to ALX 23 to 42. Around that time all except 30 and 37 were fitted with fluted steel sides. It is likely that 30 and 37 were intended to be fitted as well, and that it simply never happened.

The final batch of ALX's was built in 1969/70, and these completed the number group from ALX 43 to ALX 58. These last wagons were more like the MLX series, but without the two thin metal strips on each side.

ALX 26 was damaged in a derailment at Menangle, NSW in 1975 and written off in 1976.

==== High speed trials ====
For a fortnight in 1978, trials were conducted using wagon ALX 46, which was recoded to ALF during the two-week testing (since the ALF code was not being used). The tests were for a new type of high-speed bogie, for use on passenger services. After the testing was completed the wagon was again relettered to ALP 46. On the 29th of March 1979, ALX 58 was reclassed to ALP 58, with the same modifications.

In the 1979 recoding, the ALP class became the VMPY class. The 'PY' showed that passenger speed bogies were fitted allowing 115 km/h operation, but that the cars were not gauge convertible.

==== 1979 recoding ====
ALP 58 became VMPY 58 in 1979 and ALP 46 became VMPY 46 in 1982. For a few months in 1985, the class also included four short wagons - VMPY 5-7 and 9 ex VMAY 2, 8, 9, 17, but those were recoded away from the group when the different wagon capacities caused problems with rostering sufficient motorail capacity. The two remaining, longer VMPY wagons were reclassed to VMBP 1 and 2 around the same time.

The rest of the long ALX wagons became VMBX 1 - 57, excluding numbers 26, 35 and 46 (and 58).

In 1982, VMBX 51 was destroyed at Enfield, New South Wales and written off in 1983.

Between 1988 and 1990, the class was recoded to VMBY. The class has seen very little use since because most of the traffic is transported by road. As a result, some of the class were sold interstate, for use between Adelaide and Perth. A number of these wagons were sold to the National Rail Corporation in 1994, and those were reclassed to RMBX in 1994/95 to reflect that change in ownership.

== Car Parts Transport ==
Aside from the above bogie wagons, there were also the KF and KW four wheel wagons, and the larger BFW/VBCW wagons used for transporting car parts.

== Liveries ==
The majority of the wagons received the standard Victorian Railways freight livery of wagon red. However, those used in motorail service later received a dark blue with white lettering scheme, then a tangerine scheme with the introduction of VicRail and V/Line. Also, at one point the BFW/VBCW class were labelled with a large Ford logo.
