= VicRail R type carriage =

Series of locomotive-hauled carriages proposed to be built for Australia

R type carriage
- Number built: 0

Specifications
- Track gauge: 5 ft 3 in (1,600 mm)

The R type carriages were a series of locomotive-hauled carriages proposed to be built for the Victorian country rail network in the early and mid 1980s.

Early plans indicated a build of at least six four-carriage sets for high speed services on the Albury, Bairnsdale, Mildura and Swan Hill lines.

== Background ==
Alan Reiher, the newly minted Chairman of the Victorian Railways Board, had in mind the Spanish Talgo cars, which featured a very low centre of gravity. In April 1982, Les Rolls, a former chief mechanical engineer of the Victorian Railways, and John Hearsch, the then-current Group Manager for Country Passenger Services, travelled overseas to investigate trends and developments in high speed passenger rail services. The international tour looked at the Talgo vehicles, as well as the British Rail Mark 3 coaches and the French SNCF Corail cars, which all had features of interest. The Spanish and French cars were both significantly outside the Victorian loading gauge, and they could not easily be reduced in size. The British coaches were very close to local requirements, requiring relatively simple changes to the coupler heights, replacement of the outward-opening doors and a better air conditioning system to suit Australian climate conditions. However, British Rail advised that they could not begin construction of the Victorian cars for a few years due to a backlog of existing orders.

== Design ==
Due to the projected delay, in early 1983 Comeng's plant in Dandenong was awarded a contract from VicRail to develop concepts for the proposed country carriages.

Reiher's preference for a low centre of gravity inspired the use of a lower carriage profile overall. To allow for this, the air conditioning units were to be mounted under the floor, with cooled air pumped up through body side pillars and entering the carriage saloon through vents above the carriage racks. To ensure the minimum possible weight the cars were to be constructed with low-grade 3CR12 stainless steel, which used chromium in place of nickel and molybdenum, and is created with very fine particles making for better welding properties. Comeng had no experience with 3CR12, so experiments were undertaken to develop acceptable methods of spot and arc welding, as well as finding a suitable painting method. The steel panels were going to be rolled by Lysaghts. Also to save weight, the cars were to use head end power in lieu of fitting underfloor diesel alternator sets or belt-driven generators, as had been applied to earlier vehicles.

Early artwork for the cars reflected the low-slung body, mostly unpainted stainless steel with orange bands on the roof and below platform level, and doors in all four corners. Later artwork by Comeng's artist Phil Belbin, essentially reflected a repainted XPT carriage - with a full height body, a single vestibule with access doors at one end of each carriage, and ten windows per side.

A full-size mockup of a section of the carriage design was constructed at Newport Workshops, to show the concept to VicRail staff, unions and politicians; along with a 1:20 scale model measuring 1.2m over ends.

== Bogies ==
Comeng suggested CT22 bogies, which were under trial in preparation for the New South Wales XPT train then under development. VicRail had planned to use Socimi bogies imported from Italy. Eventually, a set of bogies were built under license by Vickers-Ruwolt Ltd.

In 1986 three pairs of Socimi bogies were imported from Italy and fitted under carriage set LH33. Locomotive A85 was temporarily regeared to operate at 160 km/h, and trials were conducted on the Western Line towards Adelaide, using the 27 kilometre section of straight track through Wal Wal, between Glenorchy and Lubeck. The train was stabled at Horsham each night during the speed trials, which were not publicly announced.

== Internal arrangement ==
The sets were planned as four carriages; one first class with a guard's compartment, one restaurant car with a buffet at one end and a disabled toilet at the other, and two economy sitting cars.

The first class carriage was planned to feature rotating and reclining seats in a 2+2 format, with fold-down meal tables fitted on the rear of each seat for use by the following passengers; this arrangement is very similar to that employed on the ACN and ACZ carriages. The capacity might have been around 56 passengers, though some of those may have been reserved for staff.

The buffet module for the restaurant carriage may have inspired later designs for the BRN cars.

The economy carriages, and the sitting area of the restaurant car, were to be organised with sets of four fixed seats and a table either side of the central aisle. Based on early sketches of the carriages showing the window arrangements, the capacity of the economy cars would likely have been around 72 passengers each; and around 56 seats for the restaurant carriage.

== Intent to build ==
By the time the New Deal of 1981 was announced, the intent to purchase N Set carriages had been inflated to eighteen 3-carriage sets each in the ACN-BN-BN configuration for the Geelong, Ballarat and other commuter runs. The same project involved the purchase of 10 N class engines, conversion or upgrading of 39 pre-existing locomotives of the B and T classes, 14 railcars of the DERM and DRC types, 79 passenger cars of the Harris, E, S and Z types, and around seventy freight wagons for parcels traffic.

The N Class locomotives were going to be rostered with R type sets on the long-distance regional services and the Overland service to Adelaide, while the A Class locomotives (ex B Class) were going to run intracity services with the N type carriages, and the P class locomotives (ex T class) were going to operate the shortest runs.

As the project evolved through 1982, the requirements changed; more new locomotives were ordered and the railcars were mostly left alone, on account of patronage spikes rendering their capacity insufficient. In lieu, the decision was made to convert a further 18 Harris type carriages for commuter traffic, and the N sets were changed from that to longer distance services with an onboard buffet, by retrofitting onboard buffet units to the then-under-construction BN cars, and shuffling the sets around.

In response, VicRail planned to purchase a separate fleet of ACR-BRR-BR-BR carriages for the regional network, to supplement and eventually replace the eldest of the S type carriages (dating back to 1937-1940) then being organised into ACZ-BRS-BS-BZ sets. At the time, nearly half of Victoria's steel airconditioned carriages were in use on the standard gauge route from Melbourne to Sydney, providing sitting capacity on trains like the Spirit of Progress and later the Melbourne/Sydney expresses; as a result, only 15 Z-type and 16 S-type sitting carriages were available for service on the rest of the Victorian network (along with 12 non-sitting or partial-sitting carriages), supplemented by the surviving airconditioned wooden carriages.

The design process lasted for about eighteen months, and was nearly complete when the plan was cancelled in mid-1984.

== Plans held back ==
The New Deal was a near-complete rebuild of the entire Victorian country rail network, and by mid-1984 the bill was starting to add up. Eventually the Treasury department stepped in, and the R type carriages were cut from the plans as surplus. To compensate the second half of the N type order was adjusted with buffet cars in lieu of economy sitting cars, and the sets were reorganised so that they could provide for the demands of both medium- and long-distance runs. In addition, the older S compartment and Z saloon cars were refurbished and formed into longer distance sets. There was also an expectation that the New South Wales XPT fleet would eventually replace the named trains between Melbourne and Sydney, both providing more S and Z cars for intrastate services, and rendering the R type cars less necessary.

== Brief revival ==
Around 1988, Melbourne submitted a bid for the 1996 Olympics, and V/Line planned to add to their existing country rail fleet to allow for the increased patronage. This was around the same time that locomotive A66 was repainted from its 1988 Bi-centennial livery to its 1996 Olympics variant of the then-standard V/Line orange with grey, and A85 was used in high speed trials. As the Olympic bid was not successful the R car project fell back off the radar.

== Project termination ==
The design of the R cars was undertaken by Commonwealth Engineering. The State Transport Authority, later known as the Public Transport Corporation, ended up purchasing the complete set of construction drawings, and attempts were made over about a ten-year period to obtain funding for construction, but with the loss of the Olympics bid, the economic downturn in the early 1990s and the later delivery of the Sprinter fleet, the drawings ended up unused. The Socimi bogies were removed from set LH33 and were last sighted at Newport Workshops.

== Epilogue ==
In the first half of the 1990s the Victorian Government paid for an extension to New South Wales's XPT order; and when the Melbourne/Sydney express was replaced with the Sydney-Albury XPT service extended to Melbourne, V/Line was able to recall its S and Z type carriages from the standard gauge services. Additionally, a downturn in patronage on The Vinelander service allowed conversion of two of its sleeping cars, 15 and 16, to BS218 and BS219 respectively. This freed a total of fifteen sitting carriages for intrastate services, including three quickly converted to ACZ composite sitting and conductor.
