= V/Line H type carriage =

Class of interurban passenger carriage used in Australia

H type carriage
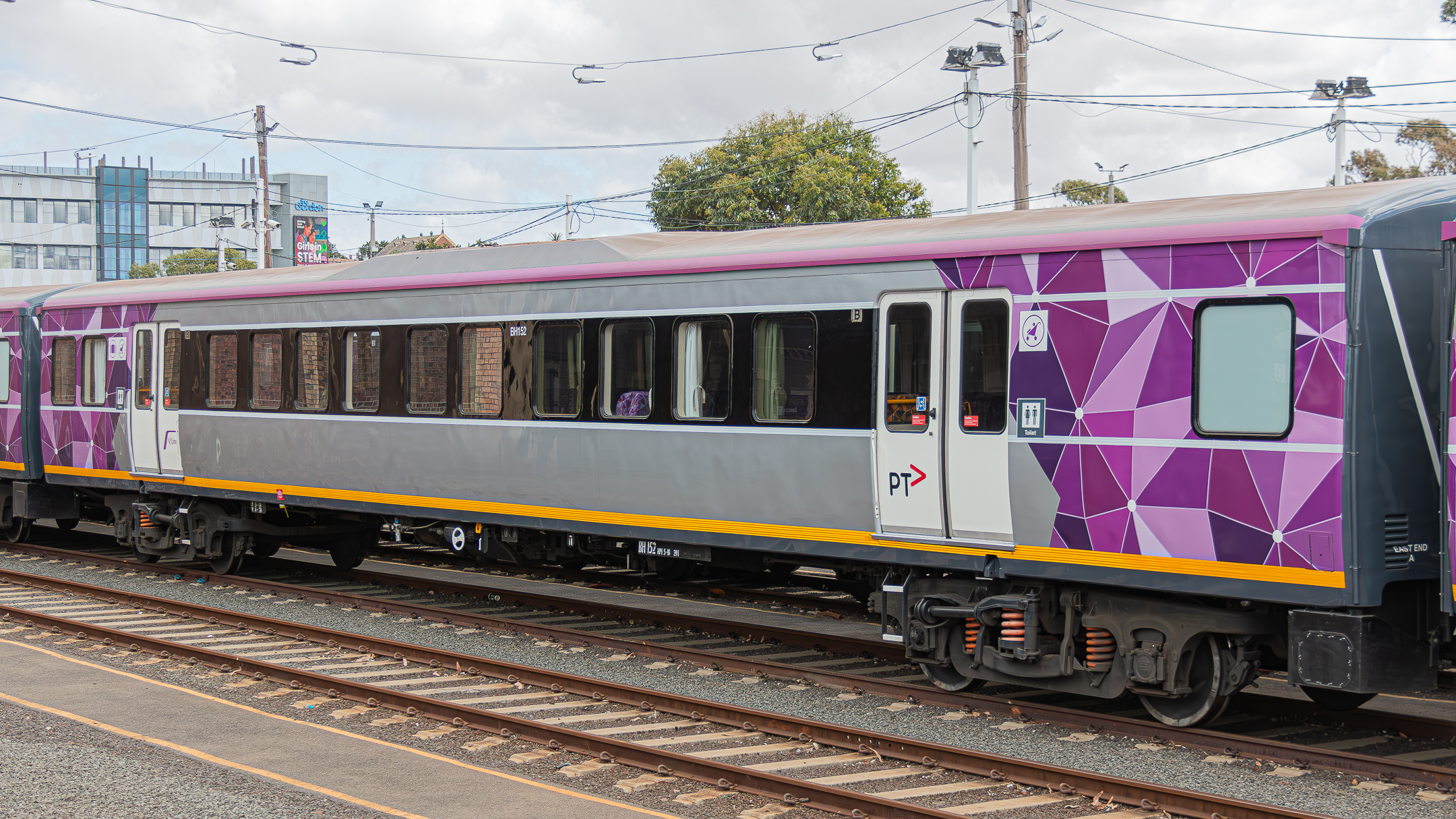
- Refurbished H Sets stored at Geelong station in March 2024

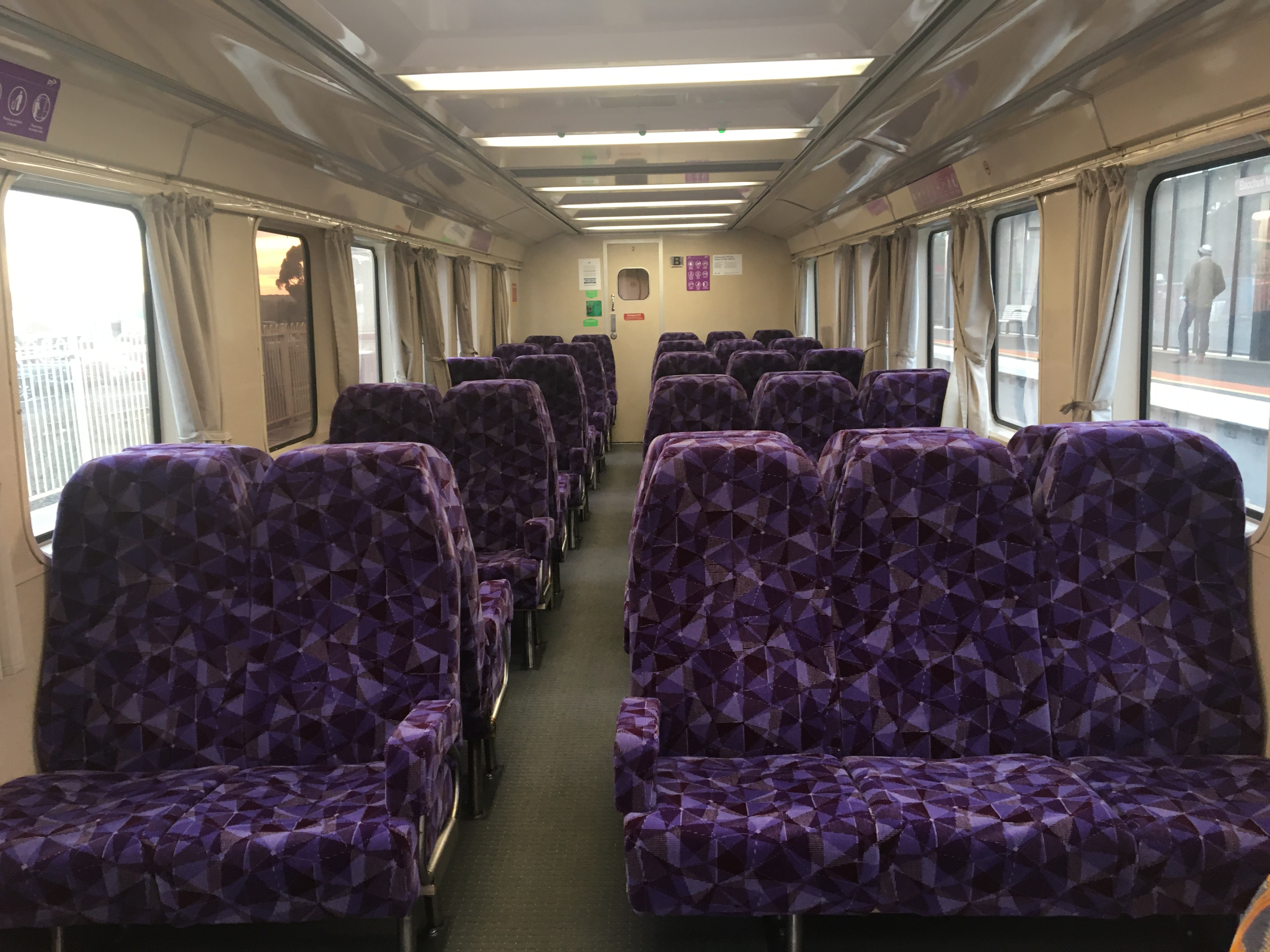
- Interior of a refurbished carriage in 2022
- In service: 1984 – 2 February 2024
- Manufacturer: V/Line
- Built at: Newport Workshops
- Replaced: PL, Short & Long W type carriages
- Constructed: Built 1956–1968 as Harris suburban EMUs; Rebuilt 1984–1992 to locomotive hauled carriages
- Entered service: 1984
- Refurbished: 2007–2011
- Scrapped: 2024–present
- Number built: 59
- Number in service: 0
- Number preserved: 18
- Number scrapped: 37
- Formation: Originally BTH-BH-BCH, later BIH cars added and sets shuffled to make 4, 5 and 6-car sets; loose MTH cars as railmotor trailers.
- Diagram: H–1 (BCH), H–2 (Long BCH), H–3 (BH), H–4 (Long BH), H–5 (BTH 161–164 & 167–171), H–6 (BTH 165 & 166, 1st-series Harris window spacing), H–7 (Long BTH)
- Fleet numbers: Ex 1st series Harris Motors – n/a Ex 2nd series Harris Motors – BCH 121–131; BCH 134 & 135 (short van); Ex 1st series Harris Trailers – BH 141–151, BIH 189 & 192–194, BTH 165–166 & 174–175, MTH 101–104; Ex 2nd series Harris Trailers – BIH 181–186, BTH 161–164 & 167–171; Ex Refurbished Harris Trailers – BIH 187–188 & 190–191; Ex Long Harris – BTH 172 & 173; BH 152 & 153; BCH 132 & 133
- Capacity: 63 passengers (BH, BTH & MTH),, 67 passengers (BIH), 54 passengers (BCH), 64 passengers (BCH134 & 135), 87 passengers (BH 152 & 153, BTH 172 & 173), 75 passengers (BCH 132 & 133)
- Operators: V/Line Passenger; previously V/Line.
- Depot: Newport Workshops
- Lines served: Wyndham Vale, Bacchus Marsh, Kyneton & Seymour Previously Geelong, Traralgon & Leongatha

Specifications
- Car body construction: 18,636 mm (61 ft 1 3/4 in) (short), 22,860 mm (75 ft 0 in) (long)
- Car length: 19,308 mm (63 ft 4 1/8 in) (short), 23,533 mm (77 ft 2 1/2 in) (long)
- Width: 2,965 mm (9 ft 8 3/4 in)
- Height: 4,017 mm (13 ft 2 1/8 in) (short), 4,014 mm (13 ft 2 in) (long)
- Articulated sections: Open gangways
- Wheelbase: 20,046 mm (65 ft 9 1/4 in) total; 4,890 mm (16 ft 1/2 in) per bogie
- Maximum speed: 115 km/h (71 mph)
- Weight: 33 tonnes (32 long tons; 36 short tons) (short BCH) 34 tonnes (33 long tons; 37 short tons) (BH, BTH, BIH, MTH) 37 tonnes (36 long tons; 41 short tons) (long BTH, BH & BCH)
- Axle load: 8.25 to 9.25 tonnes (8.12 to 9.10 long tons; 9.09 to 10.20 short tons)
- Power supply: 415 V AC diesel alternators (MTH cars only), Head end power (all other types)
- Braking system: Westinghouse
- Coupling system: Janney couplers (outer end BCH & BTH; both ends MTH); Drawbars (inner end BCH & BTH; both ends BIH & BH)
- Track gauge: 5 ft 3 in (1,600 mm)

The H type carriages were a class of interurban passenger carriage operated by V/Line in Victoria, Australia. Fitted with high-density 2+3 seating, they were typically used on short distance interurban services from Melbourne to Bacchus Marsh and Geelong until their withdrawal in 2024.

== Overview ==
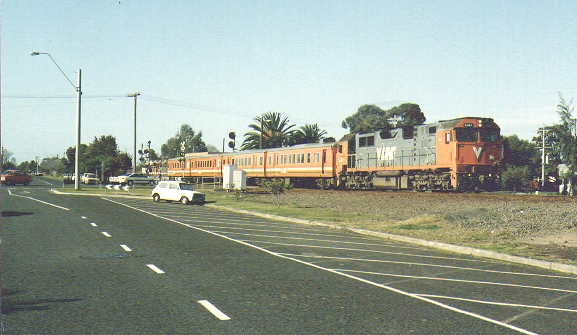
H set in the original orange and grey V/Line livery led by an N class

By 1983, the 1981 New Deal had been such a success that the incoming Cain Government ordered conversion of a fleet of the early Harris suburban Electric Multiple Units to replace the last of the older wooden carriage stock. The fleet eventually reached 59 carriages of multiple types.

For the purpose of contract negotiations, short cars were referred to as SCH, SH or STH and long as LCH, LH or LTH, respectively for conductor, regular and terminal carriages.

Each carriage has two doors per side, manually opened by passengers, but remotely closed and locked by the train conductor (except on MTH cars where originally similar to the Harris trains, access to MTH carriages from platforms is by manual opening and closing double sliding side doors, and thus can be opened by passengers at any time, however the carriages later received a power door mechanism similar to the Comeng and other members of the H type carriages). Toilets, drinking fountains and luggage areas are provided throughout each carriage set.

The carriage sets were originally used for commuter services between Melbourne and a wide range of regional cities. As more long-distance carriages became available, they were reallocated to the shorter runs, typically less than an hour end-to-end. A small number were also used on the Stony Point line.

=== Coding ===
H type carriages are numbered in the 101–200 series. Sets were issued to traffic with three types of carriage:

- BCH economy class with conductors van: 121–131; 132–133 long; 134 and 135 seat 10 more people but have a smaller van area
- BH economy class: 141–149, 150–151 were converted to BTH 174–175; 152, 153 long
- BTH economy class with terminal connections: 161–171; 172–173 long; 174–175 formerly BH 150, 151
- MTH economy class with onboard power alternators: 101–104 short

Additional cars were later constructed to increase capacity. These cars do not feature toilets:

- BIH economy class intermediate: 181–194

=== Carriage sets ===
The H type carriages originally entered service as 3 car sets, later having additional cars added to bring them up to four, five or six cars. Each set was identified by its length and carriage type.

The initial codes were:

- SH: 3 short carriages, initially sets SH21–31
- LH: 3 long carriages (using carriages converted from the 75 feet (23 m) long Harris trailers), initially sets 32 and 33.

Extended set codes were:

- FSH: the F means that the sets contains 4 carriages (until November 2012)
- VSH: the V means that the set contains 5 carriages (until November 2012)
- VLH: the L meaning long (until November 2012)
- SSH: 6 short carriages (in use November 2012); some of these sets had intermediate BCH carriages.
- SLH: 3 short carriages coupled to 3 long carriages (in use circa July 2021)

The MTH carriages had a separate roster, spending most of their service life on the Stony Point line.

== History and typical fleet use ==
=== From 1983 ===
==== Cain/Crabb order, 1983 ====
The contract was awarded to Clyde Engineering, and the initial plan was to convert 33 Harris cars to 11 semi-permanently coupled sets of BCH-BH-BTH. Originally there were concepts to pair each of the carriage sets with a permanently coupled locomotive at the West (non-conductor) end, and to fit the East-end BCH carriages with a small driving stand for controlling the P class locomotives; but this fell through on grounds of safety and inability to stop the locomotive powering instantly in case of a collision, which would have caused the carriage set to telescope.

The initial 43 carriages were sourced from assorted of Harris carriages. The short BCH conductor carriages were all built using 2nd series Harris motor cars (numbered 700 and above), while the BH, BTH and MTH cars were all taken from any era of T or BT trailer car. The six long trailers were used to create their own three-car sets. In no instance did all three cars of a particular set enter service on the same day, so that data can probably be interpreted as "date cleared for use in service," rather than "first use on a train."

1st Set	Car	Formerly	Original builder	Date built	Date rebuilt	Date re-entered service
SH21	BCH121	751M	Martin & King	1964	1983	28 Oct 1983
SH22	BCH122	747M	Martin & King	1964	1983	28 Oct 1983
SH23	BCH123	781M	Martin & King	1966	1983	16 Nov 1983
SH24	BCH124	766M	Martin & King	1965	1983	16 Nov 1983
SH25	BCH125	728M	Martin & King	1963	1983	27 Jan 1984
SH26	BCH126	726M	Martin & King / Commonwealth Engineering	1963	1984	03 Apr 1984
SH27	BCH127	750M	Martin & King	1964	1984	03 Sep 1984
SH28	BCH128	711M	Martin & King / Commonwealth Engineering	1964	1984	18 Nov 1984
SH29	BCH129	754M	Martin & King	1964	1984	10 Oct 1984
SH30	BCH130	706M	Martin & King / Commonwealth Engineering	1961	1984	29 Oct 1984
SH31	BCH131	710M	Martin & King	1962	1984	04 Dec 1984
SH32	BCH132	892T	Victorian Railways Newport Workshops	1970	1985	Feb 1985
SH33	BCH133	2896T	Victorian Railways Newport Workshops	1971	1985	1985
SH21	BH141	675T	Martin & King	1958	1983	02 Dec 1983
SH22	BH142	528BT	Martin & King	1958	1983	15 Dec 1983
SH23	BH143	516BT	Martin & King	1957	1983	15 Dec 1983
SH24	BH144	623T	Martin & King	1956	1984	27 Jan 1984
SH25	BH145	626T (Note: Newsrail June 1985 p.186 erroneously records BH145 as having been converted from 262T.)	Martin & King	1956	1984	18 Feb 1984
SH26	BH146	682T	Martin & King	1958	1984	16 Mar 1984
SH27	BH147	663T	Martin & King	1958	1984	03 Apr 1984
SH28	BH148	669T	Martin & King	1958	1984	01 May 1984
SH29	BH149	608T	Martin & King	1956	1984	22 Jun 1984
SH30	BH150	688T	Martin & King	1958	1984	27 Jul 1984
SH31	BH151	522BT	Martin & King	1958	1984	03 Sep 1984
SH32	BH152	891T	Victorian Railways Newport Workshops	1970	1984	26 Nov 1984
SH33	BH153	2895T	Victorian Railways Newport Workshops	1971	1985	Feb 1985
SH21	BTH161	862T	Martin & King	1965	1984	28 Oct 1983
SH22	BTH162	810T	Martin & King	1962	1984	02 Dec 1983
SH23	BTH163	821T	Martin & King	1962	1984	27 Jan 1984
SH24	BTH164	806T	Martin & King	1961	1984	28 Feb 1984
SH25	BTH165	509BT	Martin & King	1956	1984	28 Feb 1984
SH26	BTH166	665T	Martin & King	1958	1984	01 May 1984
SH27	BTH167	815T	Martin & King	1962	1984	28 May 1984
SH28	BTH168	834T	Martin & King	1963	1984	31 May 1984
SH29	BTH169	851T	Martin & King	1964	1984	31 May 1984
SH30	BTH170	872T	Martin & King	1965	1984	24 Jul 1984
SH31	BTH171	804T	Martin & King	1961	1984	18 Sep 1984
SH32	BTH172	893T	Victorian Railways Newport Workshops	1971	1985	Feb 1985
SH33	BTH173	894T	Victorian Railways Newport Workshops	1971	1985	Feb 1985
Loose	MTH101	517BT	Martin & King	1957	1984	18 Jun 1984
Loose	MTH102	679T	Martin & King	1958	1984	29 Jun 1984
Loose	MTH103	524BT	Martin & King	1958	1984	01 Aug 1984
Loose	MTH104	672T	Martin & King	1958	1984	21 Aug 1984

===== First deliveries and uses =====
Locomotive P11 and carriages BTH166, BH148 and BCH121 were sighted at Dynon on 28 May 1984 for crew training; these cars would go on to form parts of sets SH26, SH28 and SH21 respectively. On 21 June 1984 set SH25, complete, was at Dynon, and a week later set SH22, complete, had been worked to Spencer Street by locomotive P12.

A new roster introduced on Saturday 2 June included the first two runs utilising H sets, with trips to Kyneton, Bacchus Marsh and Seymour on weekdays only:

	Dep. Melbourne	To	Arr. Melbourne
Run 35		Kyneton	08:40
Run 35	09:05	Bacchus Marsh	11:58
Run 35	12:45	Kyneton	16:48
Run 35	17:30	Seymour	
Run 36		Seymour	08:28
Run 36	16:35	Kyneton	

The new roster saw reduced use of a locomotive-hauled set for Subury services (Run 33) and one of the DRC railcars (on Run 37). Prior to this, one H set had been based at Seymour to replace a DRC that had been reallocated to Crib Point for Stony Point line services. When running the Up Seymour train, the P+SH combination typically ran up to eight minutes late through Tallarook but made up the time approaching Broadford and was within three minutes of the DRC schedule by Wandong, two minutes by Donnybrook, and essentially on time (barring conflicting moves causing delays) by arrival at Spencer Street; this was despite the P Class locomotives and H sets (at the time) having a lower maximum speed.

Around mid-late August 1984, power vans PH451-452 and through-cabled luggage vans DH401-402 were at Dynon, and DH403 at Spencer Street, for use with the H sets. At this time, sets SH22 and SH23 and all four MTH trailer cars were in regular use (with P Class locomotives P11-14 inclusive), SH25 was based at Spencer Street, and SH21, SH24 and SH26 were all at Dynon. On 18 September, PH453 was sighted at Spencer Street, and BTH171, BCH128 and luggage van VVBP64 were sighted returning to Newport Workshops following a trial run. On 22 September, sets SH21, SH24 and SH26 were all in use along with DH403. Then on 25 September, set SH22 was at Dynon with vans DH401 and DH402; SH23, SH26, DH403, PH451 and PH452 were spare at Spencer Street yard, and SH21, SH24 and SH25 were all in use. When services were restored to the Stony Point line on 17 September it required use of one of the DRCs, so those rosters were progressively filled by newly available H sets.

The first four sets of three carriages (sets SH22, 23, 24 and 25) were delivered in the middle of 1984, and deliveries continued at a steady pace through to the end of that year with twelve 3-carriage sets, SH21 to SH31 inclusive and LH32, in service. Set LH33 entered service on 28 February 1986, a full six months after the twelfth set.

Set LH33 had been delivered around the same time as LH32, but was banned from service prior to that date. When it entered service it enabled withdrawal of the temporary four-car set SH28 with BH141 inserted; this allowed SH21 to be restored, thus permitting a range of railmotor rosters to be upgraded to H sets. It is not clear why the two-car set BCH121-BTH161 was left unused during the period while the four-car SH set was operating.

===== Contemporary use =====
The H sets were initially used on commuter runs from Spencer Street to Bacchus Marsh, Kyneton, Sunbury, Seymour and Leongatha and, on Sundays only, a run from Spencer Street to Stony Point, Frankston, Stony Point and back to Spencer Street to provide capacity above that of the normal railmotor. While never intended during the design phase, H sets were rostered on the morning outbound and midday return Shepparton service from Roster H2, dated 9 December 1984. During the long weekend holidays, H sets would occasionally be extended from Shepparton to Cobram as higher capacity rollingstock was needed elsewhere.

Otherwise, for events like football matches and the biannual runs to Lara for the Australian International Airshow at Avalon Airport, trains would be formed with nine carriages, a locomotive on each end and another between sets, near the middle. Because of the underfloor multiple-unit cabling, all locomotives on the train would work together from a single control stand; but each set of carriages was powered by its nearest P class locomotive because the power cables, for things like lighting and airconditioning, were only designed for a maximum electrical load equivalent to four carriages.

H sets were normally hauled by either N or P class locomotives, both able to supply the required head end power supply for lighting and air conditioning operation. When hauled by other classes of locomotives or if the HEP failed, a separate power van was coupled to the set to provide that same function.

Four MTH carriages were also converted in 1984, essentially BH carriages with an underfloor alternator fitted and with regular automatic couplers in place of drawbars. These were intended to be used as trailers for the Tulloch Railcars, as the older trailers were of timber construction with no airconditioning. These cars were painted with a grey roof, orange above and silver below the windowsill, to approximately match the unpainted stainless steel of the DRCs.

The four DRC and MTH sets typically worked either as a two-car set on runs to Kyneton and Sunbury (on rosters that often mixed with blue RM-MT sets), or as a four-car set (two DRCs outside, two MTHs middle) on the Stony Point line. When the DRCs failed, as was often the case, between one and three MTH cars (or occasionally, a mix of MTH, MT or E cars) would be hauled by a locomotive, with a CP van used for conductor accommodation. Notably, the MTH car toilets would not function properly unless the carriages were directly coupled to a locomotive or railcar, which limited their utility when in sets such as MTH-MTH-VVCP van; the guard's van had to be moved to the rear of the train at each end of every trip.

A test of the consist P-SH-SH-P was run on 4 March 1986 from Spencer Street to Wallan railway station using the multiple unit cables running through the sets, and the trailing locomotive uncrewed but powering. Previously the inaugural train restoring service to Leongatha had used a similar arrangement, but with the rear locomotive crewed as a precaution against the system failing.

===== Window spacing variations =====
Newsrail highlights that BTH165 and BTH166 had a different window arrangement to the rest of the class. Window spacing between the doors of each carriage were inherited from the source Harris cars, and generated either a three-two-three pattern or two sets of three windows with a narrow central gap. The three-two-three pattern applied to BTH 161-164, 167-171 and later BIH cars 181-188 and 190-191, while the six-window design was used for BTH165-166, BH141-151 (therefore BTH174-175), MTH101-104, and later BIH cars 189 and 192-194.

===== Socimi bogies =====
To prepare for a then-planned order for InterCity high speed country trains (which never eventuated), in 1986 set LH33 (BTH173-BH153-BCH133) was fitted with Socimi bogies designed for operation at 160 km/h (99 mph). The set was first sighted equipped as such on 12 January 1986. The set was hauled by locomotive A85 on runs between Glenorchy and Lubeck on the main Melbourne to Adelaide line, starting from Wednesday 23 July 1986. The section was selected as the longest section of straight track on the Victorian network at 27 km (17 mi) long, though its ordinary track speed was 115 km/h (71 mph). The tests were conducted following V/Line officials' overseas visits to study high speed rail operation in Britain and the Talgo trains in Spain.

During the test period the individual bogies had two selector levers either side to apply disc brakes when parked (released with the handle horizontal), and the carriages were stencilled midway along each side with "Socimi brake equipped. Underframe brake cylinder disconnected".

==== Cain/Kirner order, 1989 ====
As of 1987, V/Line intended to convert a further five Harris cars to H type for interurban services, as replacements for the remaining DERM units that dated back to the 1930s.

With the 1990 election quickly approaching and the last of the electric Harris fleet due for withdrawal, the Cain government elected to order conversion of another eight carriages to a new class, BIH. These were functionally identical to the BH carriages, but toilets were not provided, instead being fitted with additional seating. The order also featured two more BCH conductor carriages, though these were fitted with smaller vans and an additional ten seats, compared to their predecessors.

All ten new carriages were delivered in the V/Line orange scheme with green and white stripes, and by the end of 1989 the whole of sets FSH21 (outshopped 19 December 1989), FSH22, FSH24 and SH27 (without carriage-side logos), as well as the BIH cars in sets 23, 25 and 32.

BIH carriages 187 and 188, and the two new conductor cars BCH134 and BCH135, were converted from Grey Ghost stock - previously refurbished less than ten years ago - while the remainder came from regular blue Harris stock.

As at March 1990 grey ghost cars 901M, 902M, 3501T and 3506T were at Newport Workshops, with speculation that these along with the four MTH cars would be used to make two more FSH sets. By 30 July 1990, cars 901M-3508T-3502T-968M-3507T-907M were stored at Newport pending conversion, while 902M, 908M, 3501T and 3506T had been converted to BCH134, BCH135, BIH187 and BIH188. (Note: This source says 3501-902-908-3506 to 134-135-187-188, but that does not match other records.) In the end, 901M did not end up getting converted.

The new BIH carriages were inserted into existing sets SH21-SH25 and SH27-SH28, bringing their capacity up to approximately match the long set LH33, while car BIH186 was placed in set LH32. Sets SH26, SH29, SH30 and SH31 were left as three-car sets, the latter noted as working with a non-head-end-power locomotive and power van PH452. As at 10 August 1990 MTH104 was being repainted into the V/Line orange scheme, while MTH101 and MTH102 were in use on the Stony Point line and MTH103 was based in Melbourne. In mid-late August 1990 the overhead wiring was being rehabilitated between Flinders Street and Caulfield, which required the use of two push-pull sets running shuttle trips (typically one each T-SH-P and P-FSH-P).

The total set formation as at 1 October 1990 was:

- FSH21 - BCH121-BIH181-BH141-BTH161; copy for FSH22, 23, 24, 25 and 27
- SH26 - BCH126-BH146-BTH166; copy for sets SH28, 29, 30
- SH31 - BCH131-BIH188-BTH171
- FLH32 - BCH132-BIH186 (Note: source erroneously says BIH153; BIH186 is the only car unaccounted for)-BH152-BTH172
- LH33 - BCH133-BH153-BTH173 (Socimi bogies)
- SH34 - BCH134-BH151-BCH135 (Note: By process of elimination, this set was photographed on the cover of Newsrail, March 1991)

Around March 1991 ten blue Harris cars were being held at Newport Workshops pending conversion as further H type carriages, though by 7 June six of them were sighted at Dandenong prior to disposal. As at 22 March 1991, all sets except SH26, SH28, SH29, SH30 and LH33 had at least one carriage in the new V/Line livery. MTH102 and SH26 were noted in the new livery on 3 and 4 June respectively.

The first regular use of double H sets with a P Class locomotive on each end was in the 6 August 1989 timetable, running the afternoon return Sunbury service. On arrival back at Spencer Street the train was split, forming evening runs to both Sunbury and Geelong. Once the FSH sets became available, event traffic like the Airshow trains increased to twelve-car trains with a locomotive on each end and a third between carriages eight and nine.

=== From 1992 ===
==== Kirner/Spyker order, 1992 ====
By 1992, Steve Crabb had long-since been replaced as the Victorian Member of Parliament with the Transport Portfolio. His successor, Peter Spyker, authorised an order for the final six BIH carriages, 189-194 inclusive. These were delivered in 1992 and allowed the remaining three Short sets to be extended to match capacity. These final carriages were converted from previously refurbished "Grey Ghost" Harris stock, rather than the original blue cars. At the same time, two BH carriages had automatic couplers fitted at one end and these were reclassed BTH.

The final BIH carriages were allocated to existing sets, with the result by end of 1992 being:

- FSH21-29 and LH32 all of roughly equal capacity (247-249 seats)
- SH sets 30, 31, 34 and 35 with only three carriages each (184-194 seats)
- FLH33 as an orphan (316 seats)
- MTH 101 to 104 (63 seats each)

High-ranking staff within V/Line were aware at the time that the last of the Harris electric fleet was being withdrawn, and tried to facilitate conversion of the remaining six Grey Ghost vehicles (Motors 901M, 903-907M) to add to the H car fleet. This was knocked back because, at the time, it was thought that more than just 22 of the new Sprinter railcars were going to be ordered. 901M was withdrawn in 1991, 903M ended up being preserved at the Newport Railway Museum in 1992, and the other four cars were scrapped in 1994.

In 1994 the Tulloch railmotors were withdrawn from service, freeing the four MTH cars. Consideration was given to converting them to other classes for incorporation in normal H sets. However, it was decided to instead operate the MTH carriages exclusively on the Stony Point route, because an infrequent, isolated shuttle service would have been a waste of one of the N or P class locomotives with head-end power, better used elsewhere. (Note: If the Stony Point line had run from Spencer Street in lieu of Frankston, then it is quite possible that the H fleet would have been reworked with thirteen FSH and two LH sets (plus one spare carriage), all with about 250 seats.) The use of MTH cars in locomotive-hauled trains was arrangement was formalised in August 1994; from then on the Stony Point line was serviced by a T class locomotive hauling two MTH carriages on weekdays or an A Class hauling three on weekends.

==== V/Line Passenger and Freight split, 1995 ====
In 1995, the entire H-series fleet was passed from V/Line to V/Line Passenger. With this split, V/Line Passenger inherited four of the eleven A class and eight of the thirteen P class locomotives, so the latter were rostered in place of T class engines on the Stony Point line. This wasted the head-end-power facility of the P class engines, so the A class locomotives soon became a permanent fixture even on weekdays. On one occasion, an X class diesel, in V/Line Freight livery was employed, hauling three MTH carriages. The fourth MTH carriage was always in rostered maintenance, with carriage and locomotive swaps performed every Thursday and Sunday night.

=== From 1999 ===
In 1999, the fleet was reorganised. Previously, there had been four SH, nine FSH, one LH and one FLH set. In September of that year, set SH35 was split up, and set FSH28 lost its BIH carriage. The now-loose four carriages were reallocated to sets 22, 26, 29 and 32, so the new split became four SH, five FSH, three VSH and two FLH sets. Other than the remaining FSH sets (all 247 seats), the new set makeup had nearly every set with its own consist and differing capacity. Each of the different consists also had slightly different weights, lengths, capacities and door layouts, affecting the timetabling.

- The SH sets, 28, 30, 31 and 34, respectively had 180, 184, 184 and 194 seats.
- The FSH sets, 21, 23, 24, 25 and 27, all had 247 seats.
- The FLH sets, 32 and 33, had 316 seats
- The VSH sets, 22, 26 and 29 had 310, 314 and 311 seats respectively.
- The four MTH cars, 101-104, 63 seats each and fitted with Metcard equipment, on the Stony Point line

As a result, rosters were often written with specific sets in mind; the VSH and FLH sets could be grouped into a fleet of five sets for the longer runs, and the FSH sets for the shorter runs. The SH sets were either run individually on the shortest runs, or in pairs on the longest.

When the five-carriage sets were formed, the end BTH and BCH cars were recabled with higher-capacity wiring, to avoid any risk of overheating. However, the P Class locomotives were only able to supply power for four carriages' worth of air-conditioning and lighting and did not have sufficient power for acceleration of a five-carriage set, so those trains had to be hauled by N class engines, or A class engines with a PH power van attached. Additionally, because of the drawbar and inter-carriage doorway arrangements, BCH135 and BTH175 were reversed for coupling to Set #29.

Later in this period, patronage spikes would require coupling an FSH with SH set, for a seven-car consist. These services became colloquially known as the "Poor Man's XPT", with a P class locomotive on each end of the consist, controlled by a single crew. No trials were performed with push/pull 2xFSH sets, because it was clear from P-FSH-SH-P sets that any such consist would have been too heavy for passenger train schedules, requiring a minimum power to weight ratio. (However, in later years, two P class locomotives would be used with eight total H type carriages in event traffic.)

In 2004, carriage BIH187 was pulled from set FSH27, and stored at Newport Workshops. It was returned to the set about three months later.

=== From 2005 ===
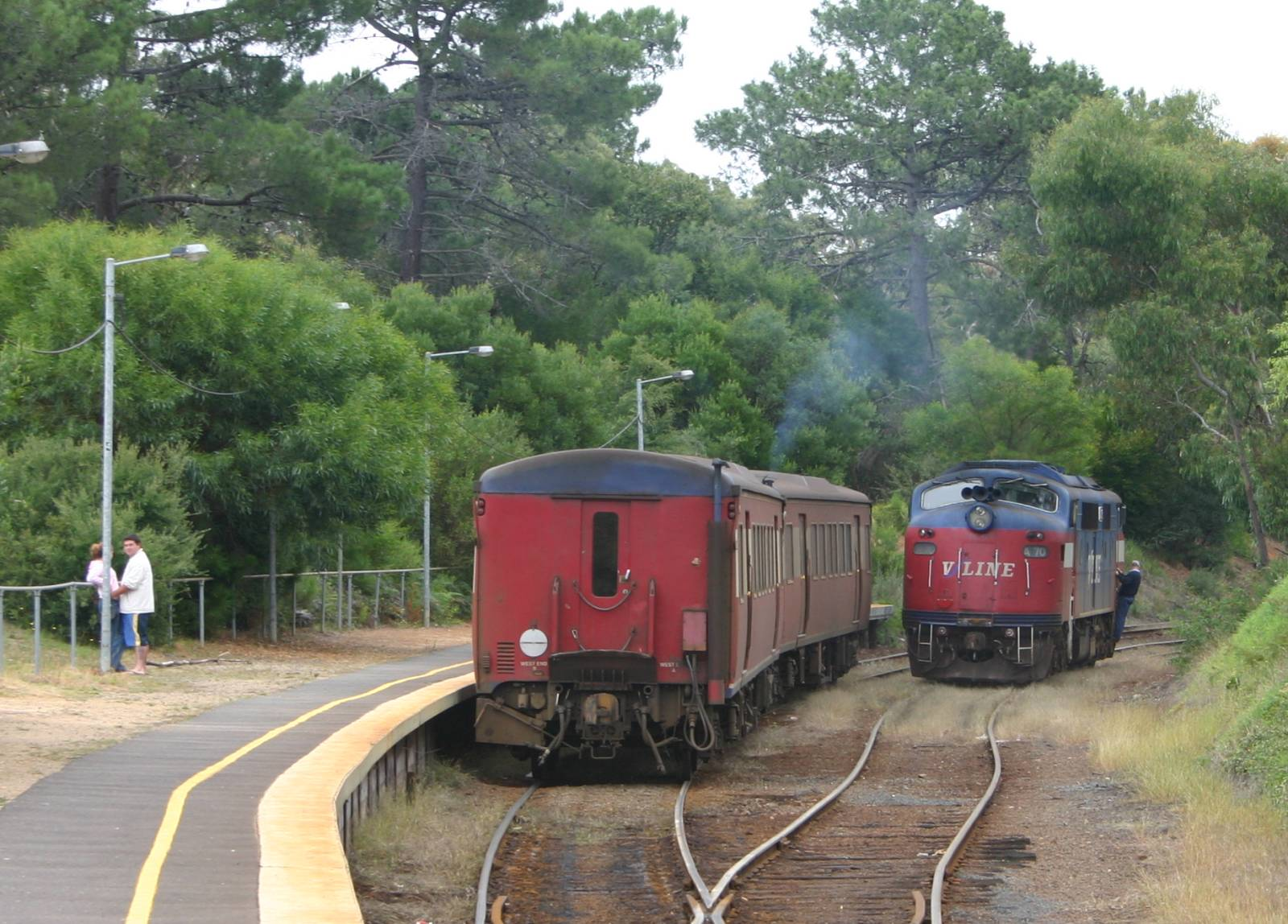
2 MTH cars at Stony Point station in February 2005

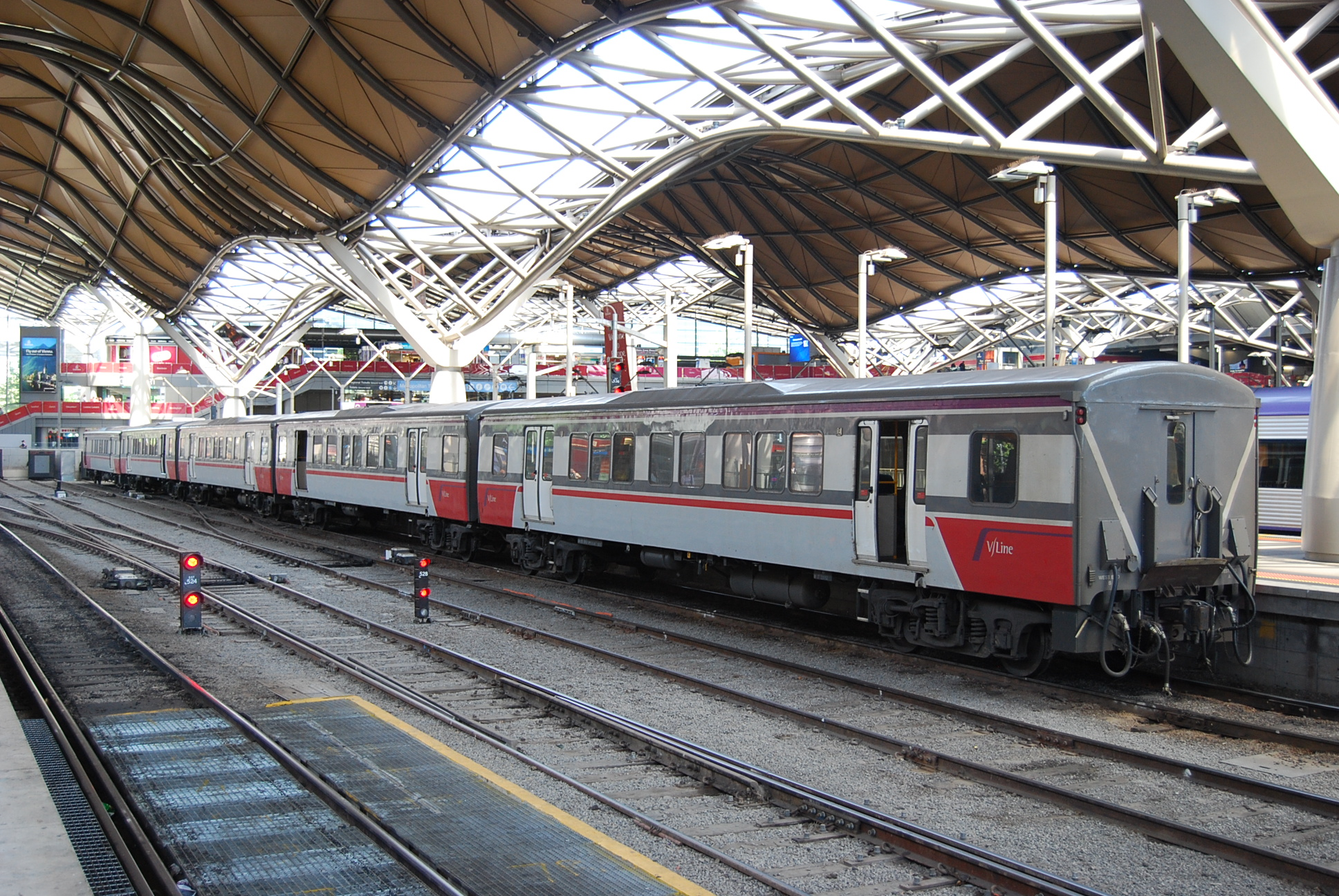
H type carriages at Southern Cross station in November 2010

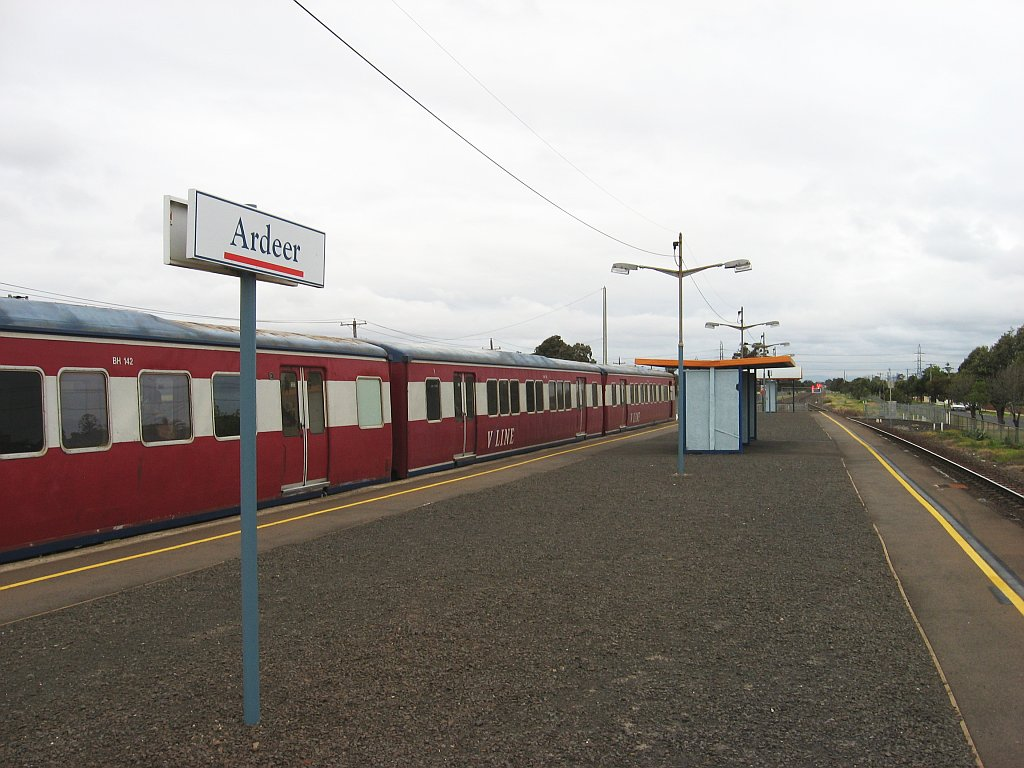
H type carriage in the V/line red livery at Ardeer.

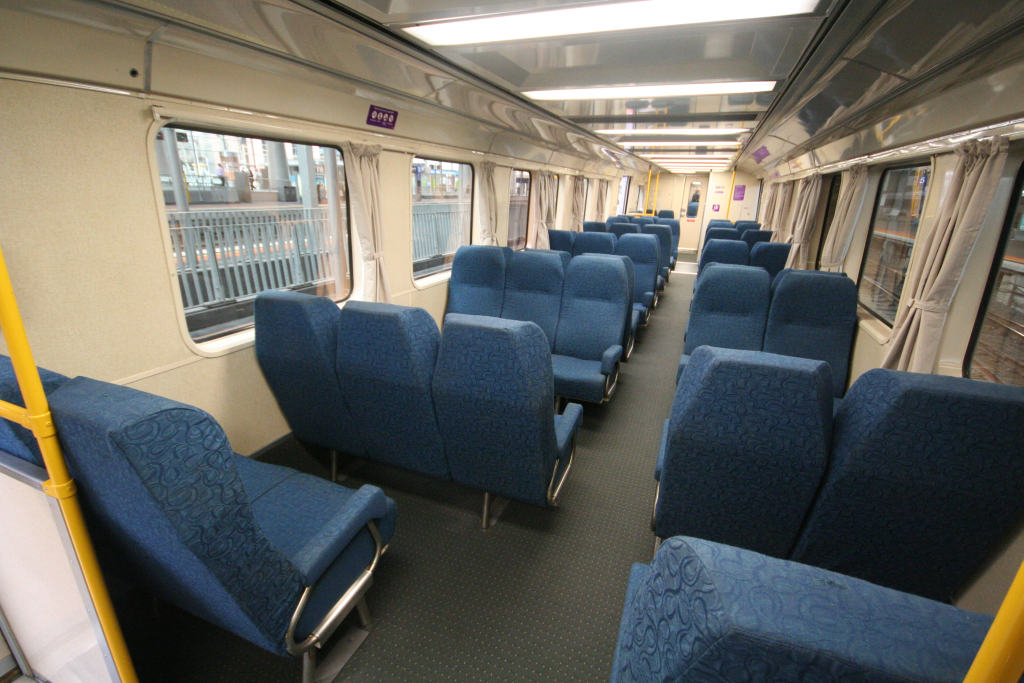
The interior of a refurbished H type carriage in 2007.

In 2005, Marshall station was opened as an extension to the Geelong line. It was serviced by H sets previously running only to South Geelong, along with trains running to Warrnambool.

2006 saw another reorganisation of the H cars, this time on account of VLocity deliveries with Regional Fast Rail project. The VLocities were supposed to replace the H sets, but patronage booming meant they had to be retained. As part of the reorganisation, the H type carriages were refurbished and repainted into the new V/Line livery from September 2007.

As a result, set SH34 was split up, and sets 21, 27 and 32 lost their BIH coaches. Like when SH35 had been broken up, carriages BCH134 and BTH174 were reversed, for coupling to Set #32. The six freed cars were reallocated to sets 23, 28, 32 and 33, with the new outline thus-

- The SH sets, 21, 27, 30 & 31 had 180, 180, 184 and 184 seats respectively.
- The FSH sets, 24, 25 & 28 each had 247 seats.
- The VSH sets, 22, 23, 26 & 29 had 310, 314, 314 and 311 seats respectively.
- The VLH sets, 32 & 33, had 376 and 383 seats respectively.
- The four MTH cars, 101-104, 63 seats each and fitted with Metcard equipment, on the Stony Point line

With the deliveries of the VLocity fleet, the H sets were largely replaced by railcars on the longer runs, and so they began running more frequently on Melton and Bacchus Marsh, Sunbury and Kyneton, and Seymour services.

The MTH cars remained in use until 26 April 2008, after which Sprinter trains were introduced on the Stony Point line in lieu. The cars were placed into storage at Newport Workshops until 2011, when MTH 102 was converted to an inspection car for Metro Trains Melbourne. It now operates between two T class locomotives as IEV102 for inspection trains. The other three MTH carriages are stored, along with unused BH141.

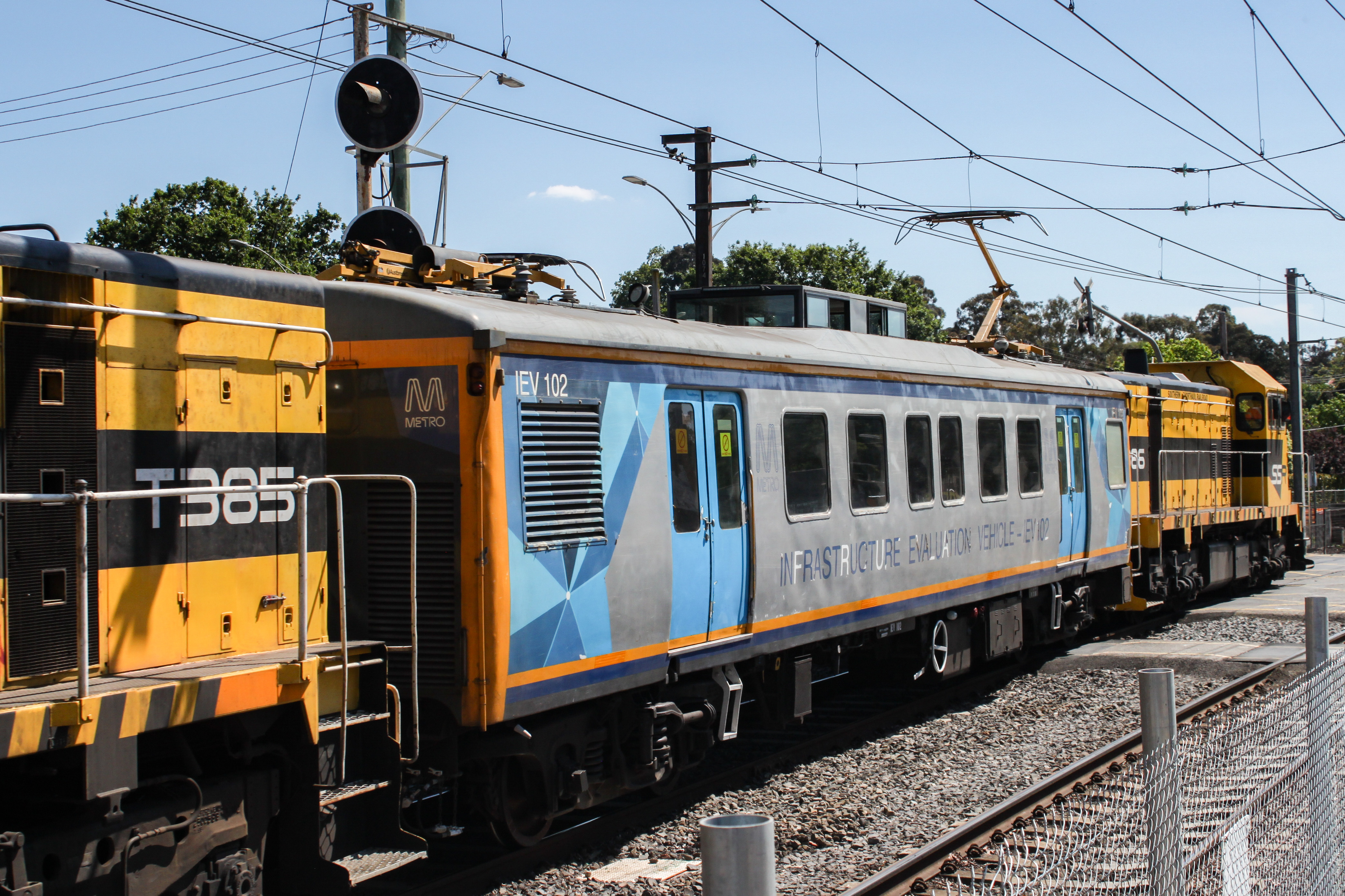
Converted MTH car IEV102 is seen on a Metro Track evaluation run with SSR T386 and T385

=== From 2012 ===
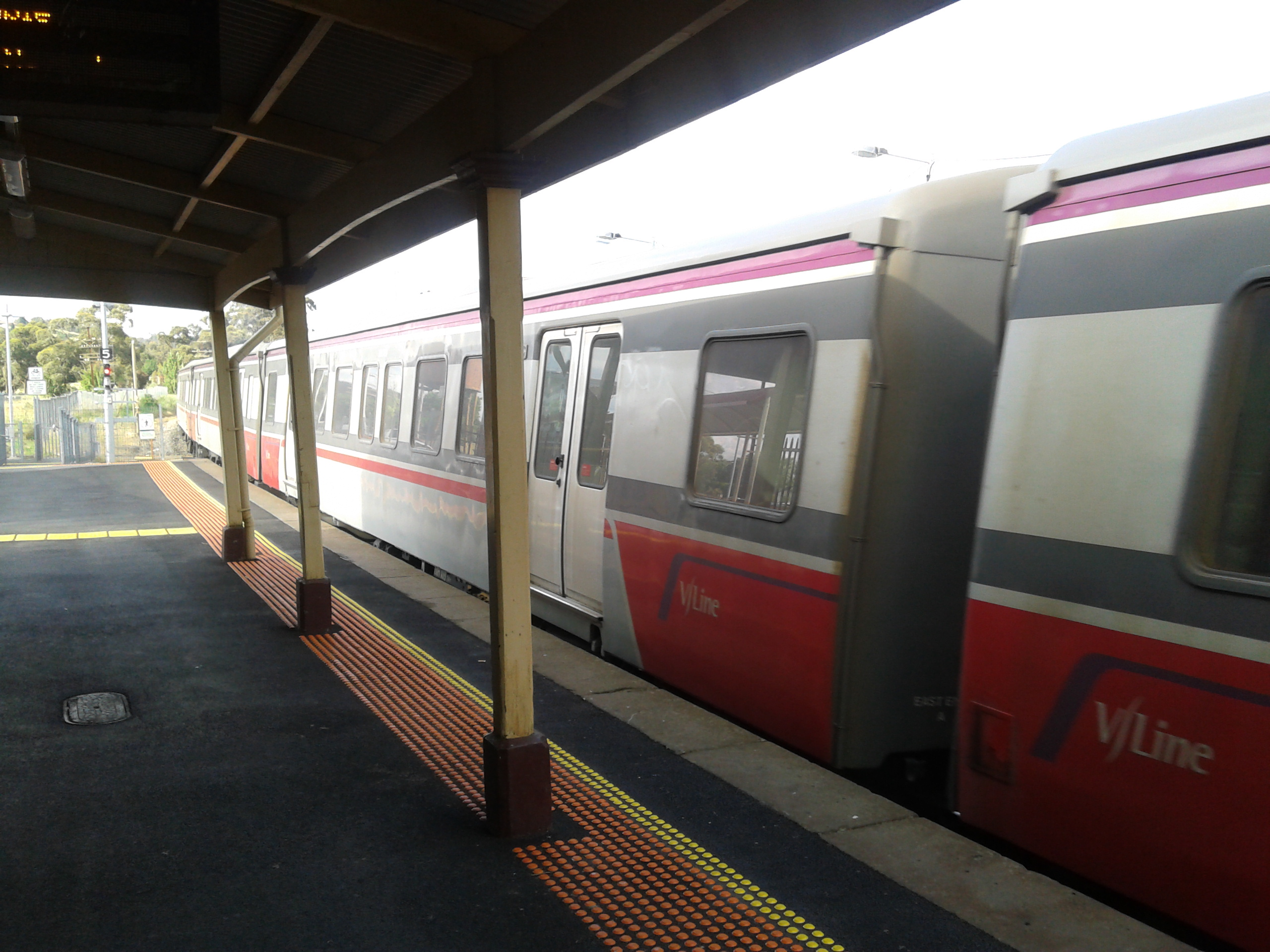
H type carriage at Wallan.

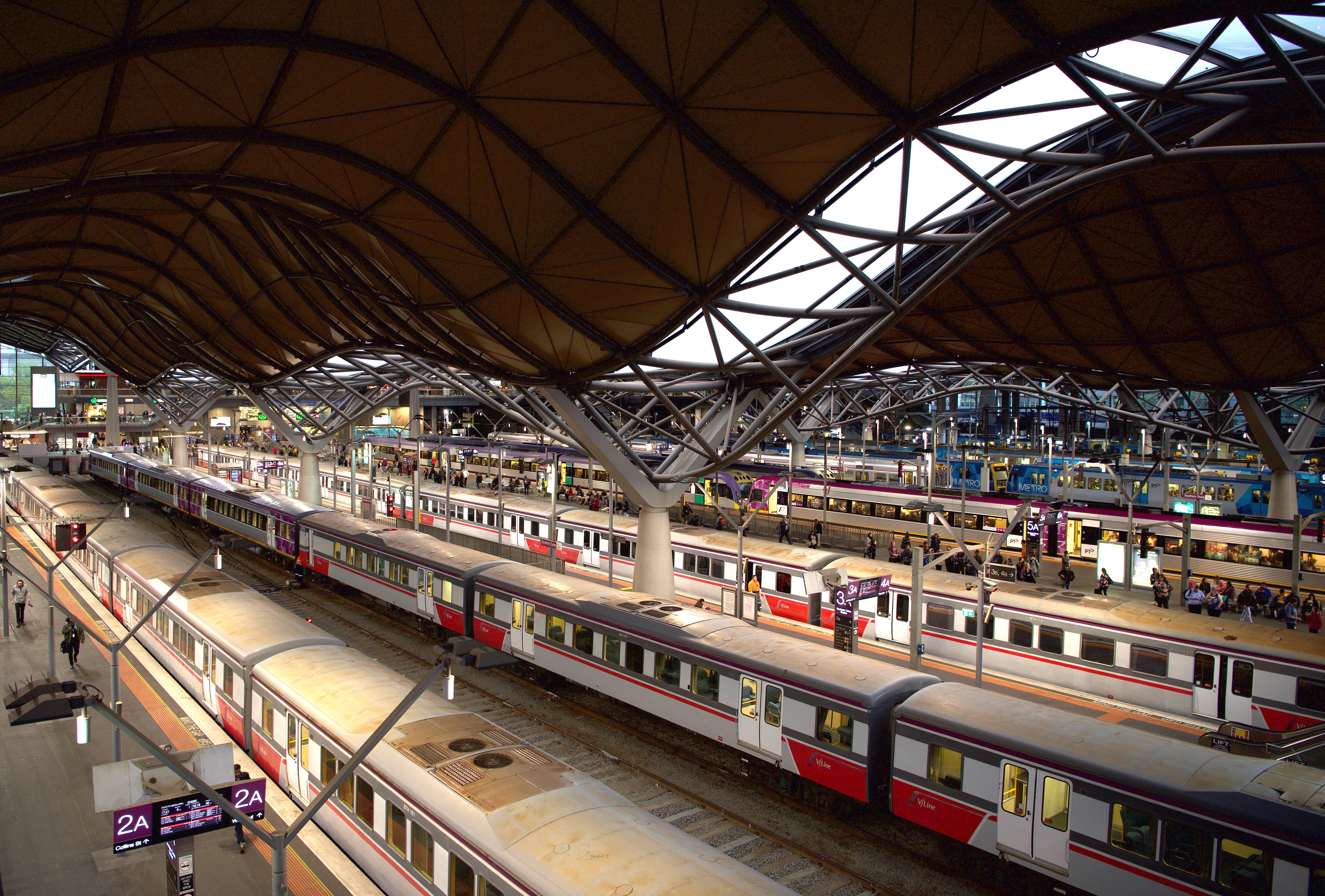
H type carriages at platforms 2A, 3A, and 4A, Southern Cross.

In conjunction with a new timetable of 18 November 2012, the H set fleet was reorganised to give three six-car sets as well as twelve semi-permanently-coupled three-car sets, giving an effective total of nine six-car sets in service. These trains usually provided peak-hour services to Bacchus Marsh, Wyndham Vale and Seymour, hauled by N and P class locomotives. Stock shortages of other classes mean there were almost daily runs of H carriage sets to Marshall and Traralgon.

All carriages have now been recabled to allow a single head-end-power unit to operate the entire train from one end, rather than requiring a separate power source for carriages beyond the fourth or fifth.

The current capacities are:

- SH21+SH27 and SH23+SH24, 364 seats; SH25+SH30, 368 seats
- SH29+SH35, 378 seats; SSH sets 22, 26 and 28, 377 seats each
- SH31+LH33, 433 seats; LH32+SH34, 443 seats

Loose carriage BH141 (63 seats) was stored at Newport Workshops, along with unused MTH 101, 103 and 104.

=== 2015 roster ===
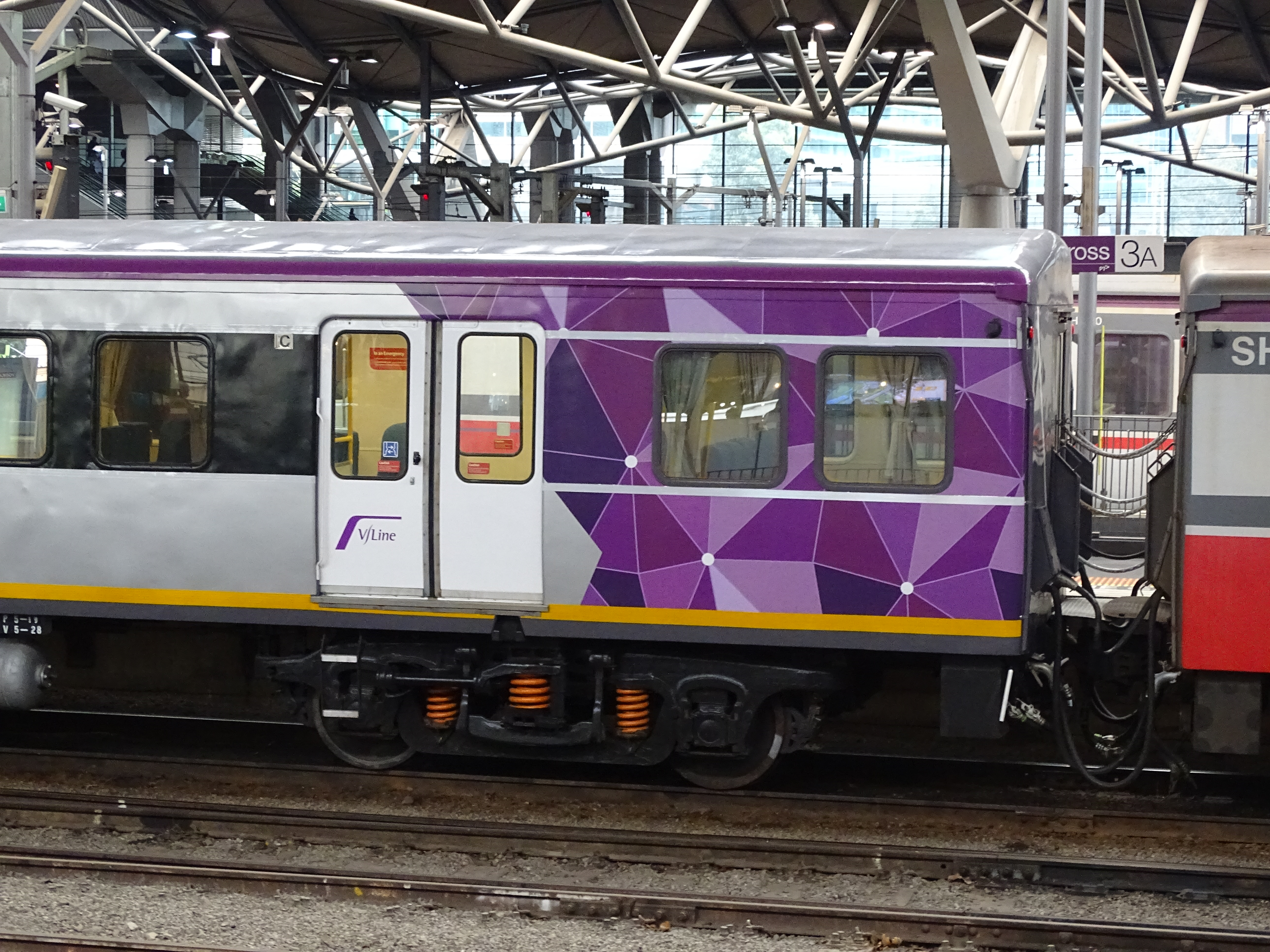
Refurbished H type carriage

From July 2015, there were no regularly scheduled H sets on the Northern or Eastern regions, or anywhere at all on weekends, though occasional carriage shortages saw these sets filling in for other services. Quite often, H sets filled in on Geelong & Shepparton runs, resulting in first class and buffet facilities being unavailable. H sets were used on Seymour, Wyndham Vale and Bacchus Marsh runs from this time. All these rosters were hauled by N or P class locomotives, occasionally aided by A66.

From January 2017, one H set resumed operations along the Geelong line, having been moved from the Seymour Line. This set ran the 7:36 am Geelong to Southern Cross, and the 6:18 pm Southern Cross to Geelong.

In late August 2017, some of the H sets were altered to account for the withdrawal of the P class locomotives. The two SH-LH sets alternated between Geelong and Bacchus Marsh; the SSH set (with A66 and a PH power van) and one SH-SH pair were captive to Bacchus Marsh runs; and the three remaining SH-SH pairs cycled around three rosters, either Bacchus Marsh to Southern Cross, Southern Cross to Geelong and Geelong to Southern Cross over the course of a day. The ex-Bacchus Marsh roster included a trip to Seymour in the afternoon.

In January 2021, H sets were re-rostered exclusively on the Bacchus Marsh and Shepparton lines, alongside occasional unscheduled runs to Geelong and elsewhere. However, from October 2022, due to the replacement of loco-hauled services on the Shepparton line, it was necessary to reinstate a daily trip to Geelong, while Shepparton services are now operated by VLocities. Thus, from 23 October, the 7:23am Geelong to Southern Cross and 4:18pm Southern Cross to Geelong have been operated by H sets.

=== Post-Covid ===
In the era after Covid significant quantities of VLocity carriages were delivered; this in conjunction with the general replacement of locomotive-hauled trains across the board led to some minor set reconfigurations. Generally speaking, the sets previously formed were retained, with reclassifications around the time the sets entered the workshops for refurbishing into the PTV shard livery.

The sets formed were 22, 23, 25, 26, 27, 28, 31, 32 and 33, each six carriages. Of these, sets 22, 26 and 28 had a single BTH and BCH car each with the middle four cars assorted BIH and BH types; the other sets had two BTH, two BCH and one or two of the BH and BIH types. Long-van cars BCH134 and BCH135 were used in the middle of sets SSH27 and SSH31, and the 75ft long cars formed the east end of sets SLH32 and SLH33.

IEV102 remained in use by Metro Trains as an inspection vehicle. MTH101, 103, 104 and BH141 remained stored at Newport Workshops.

On 26 July 2023 a train hauled by N Class locomotives N465 and N460 transferred H sets SSH28 and SSH27 to Shepparton for storage; these had returned to Newport by November for disposal. Also in late October and early November, sets SSH31 and SSH23 were transferred (separately) to Echuca for storage.

As of November 2023, the master train plan only required one SLH set and no SSH sets. This set ran on weekdays from Maddingley sidings at 7:17am, picked up at Bacchus Marsh at 7:26am and arrived in Melbourne at 8:20am, then stabled. In the afternoon, it left Southern Cross at 5:21pm, ran to Melton, arriving 6:02pm, then was overtaken by a Wendouree service and continued as a separate service at 6:12pm for Bacchus Marsh at 6:28pm, finally running empty at 6:31pm to Maddingley at 6:37pm. Neither the locomotives or carriages from this roster were used on weekends.

As of March 2024, the last ever revenue H set services were on 2 February 2024, using SLH32 (with SH25) and SLH32 (with SH31), hauled by N456 "City of Colac", leaving from Southern Cross Station at 19:18, and then running to Waurn Ponds Station.

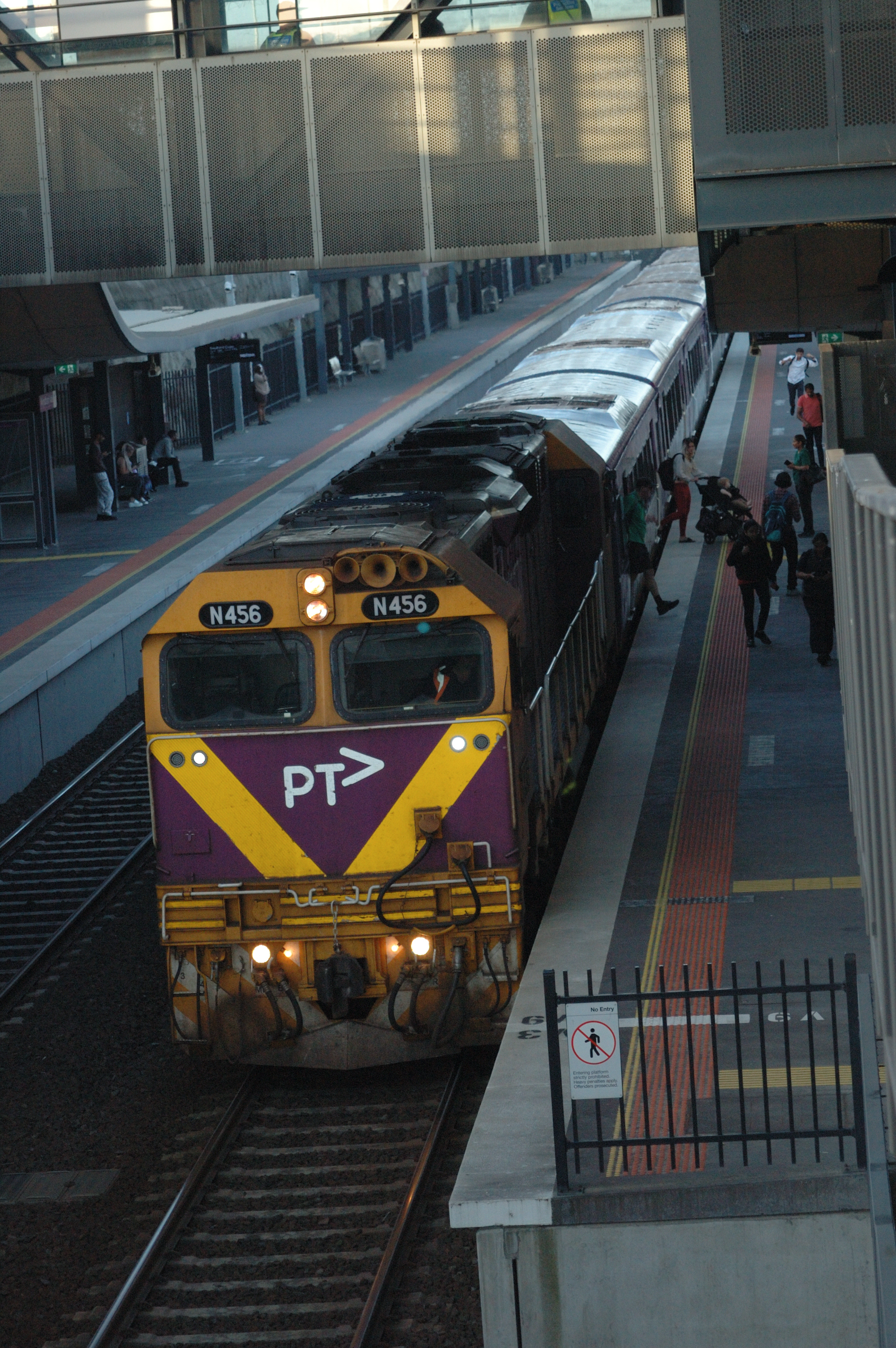
N456 hauling the final revenue H set service seen at Wyndham Vale Station.

=== Disposal and Preservation ===
The six LH Cars from SLH32/33 have been set aside for preservation.

On 6 November 2024, Steamranger in South Australia announced on their Facebook page that they had acquired six H type carriages from V/Line. Enthusiast videos indicate these were sets SH25 (BCH125-BIH185-BTH165; set marked as SSH25) and SH21 (BCH121-BIH181-BTH161), along with power van PH454.

By 4 March 2025, carriages BTH174-BIH193-BCH134 were transferred to 707 Operations. This leaves a total of fifteen H cars in preservation. Notably, all three preserved short sets have a BIH as the central carriages, rather than a BH, meaning that none can be restored to their original configuration (unless BTH174 reverts to BH150, but BCH130 and BTH170 were not preserved).

By 18 March 2025, all remaining H type carriages (fourteen BCH, eleven BH, twelve BIH and fourteen BTH) were removed from the V/Line rolling stock register (along with 26 other carriages and seven vans).

=== Set history ===
Note: Colours are representative only, and do not directly correlate to liveries worn in the era. In particular, V/Line with silver stripes vs white and green stripes, and V/Line Passenger MkI and MkII liveries, are not necessarily marked separately.

Code	Set No.	From	To	Car F	Car E	Car D	Car C	Car B	Car A (East end)	Capacity	Weight	Length	Changes to achieve	Notes
SH	21	09 Jul 1984	31 Oct 1985				BTH161	BH141	BCH121	180	105t	58m	As Built	
"SH"	21	01 Nov 1985	By 27 Mar 1986					BTH161	BCH121	~~113~~	61t	36m	Lose BH141 to "SH"28	Not used during this time.
SH	21	By 27 Mar 1986	By 01 Aug 1987				BTH161	BH141	BCH121	180	105t	58m	Regain BH141 ex "SH"28.	
"SH"	21	By 01 Aug 1987	By 04 Dec 1987			BTH167	BH147	BH141	BCH121	251	139t	77m	Lose BTH161 to SH27; gain BH147 & BTH167 ex SH27.	
SH	21	By 07 Feb 1988	05 Jul 1989				BTH161	BH141	BCH121	180	105t	58m	Regain BTH161 ex SH27 and lose BH147 & BTH167 to SH27.	
FSH	21	06 Jul 1989	01 Sep 1996			BTH161	BH141	BIH181	BCH121	247	138t	77m	Add BIH181, new build.	
FSH	21	01 Sep 1996	01 Oct 2006			BTH161	BH141	BIH181	BCH121	247	138t	77m	Repainted	
SH	21	01 Oct 2006	26 Nov 2012				BTH161	BH141	BCH121	180	105t	58m	Remove BIH181 to Newport Workshops	
SH	21	26 Nov 2012	c. 2022				BTH161	BIH181	BCH121	184	104t	58m	Add BIH181 ex Set #25, remove BH141 to Newport Workshops	Paired with SH27
SH	21	c. 2022	Until withdrawal										Set absorbed into SLH33	
SH	22	28 Jun 1984	By 01 Aug 1987				BTH162	BH142	BCH122	180	105t	58m	As Built	
SH	22	By 01 Aug 1987	By 17 Jul 1989										Set dissolved into SH27 & LH32	
FSH	22	By 17 Jul 1989	01 Sep 1996			BTH162	BH142	BIH182	BCH122	247	138t	77m	Reformed; add BIH182, new build	A photograph of what may be BIH182 under construction is in Newsrail, December 1989 p.381.
FSH	22	01 Sep 1996	15 Jul 1999			BTH162	BH142	BIH182	BCH122	247	138t	77m	Repainted	
VSH	22	15 Jul 1999	01 Nov 2012		BTH162	BH149	BH142	BIH182	BCH122	310	172t	96m	Add BH149 ex Set #29	Briefly ran as orange VSH with original cables, so only one airconditioning unit on BCH135 and BTH169 was in service to limit power draw. Re-entered workshops for provision of power doors and locks, high capacity cables, and repainting to red. Fitted with new sliding doors and locks by December 1999.
SSH	22	01 Nov 2012	c. 2021	BTH162	BH149	BIH184	BH142	BIH182	BCH122	377	205t	116m	Add BIH184 ex Set #24	
SSH	22	c. 2021	Until withdrawal	BTH162	BH149	BIH184	BH142	BIH182	BCH122	377	205t	116m	Repainted	
SH	23	01 Jun 1984	13 Jul 1989				BTH163	BH143	BCH123	180	105t	58m	As Built	
FSH	23	13 Jul 1989	01 Feb 1997			BTH163	BH143	BIH183	BCH123	247	138t	77m	Add BIH183, new build	
FSH	23	01 Feb 1997	25 Sep 2007			BTH163	BH143	BIH183	BCH123	247	138t	77m	Repainted	
VSH	23	25 Sep 2007	c. 01 May 2012		BTH163	BIH181	BH143	BIH183	BCH123	314	171t	96m	Add BIH181 ex Newport	
FSH	23	c. 01 May 2012	01 Nov 2012			BTH163	BH143	BIH183	BCH123	247	138t	77m	Remove BIH181 to Set #25	
"FSH"	23	01 Nov 2012	By 31 Jan 2021				BTH163	BIH183	BCH123	184	104t	58m	Remove BH143 to Set #26, BIH181 to Newport	Paired with SH24
SSH	23	By 31 Jan 2021	Until withdrawal	BTH164	BH144	BCH124	BTH163	BIH183	BCH123	364	209t	116m	Absorbed SH24	Stored Echuca circa November 2023
SH	24	26 Jun 1984	27 Jul 1989				BTH164	BH144	BCH124	180	105t	58m	As Built	First set to have suspension upgraded for 115 km/h running.
FSH	24	27 Jul 1989	19 Sep 1997			BTH164	BH144	BIH184	BCH124	247	138t	77m	Add BIH184, new build	
FSH	24	19 Sep 1997	01 Nov 2012			BTH164	BH144	BIH184	BCH124	247	138t	77m	Repainted	Fitted with new sliding doors and locks by December 1999.
"FSH"	24	01 Nov 2012	By 31 Jan 2021				BTH164	BH144	BCH124	180	105t	58m	Remove BIH184 to Set #22	Paired with SH23.
SH	24	By 31 Jan 2021	Until withdrawal										Set absorbed into SSH23	
SH	25	07 Jun 1984	04 Dec 1987				BTH165	BH145	BCH125	180	105t	58m	As Built	
"SH"	25	By 04 Dec 1987	c. 20 Jul 1990			BTH167	BH147	BH145	BCH125	243	139t	77m	Remove BTH165; add BH147 and BTH167 ex "SH"27	
FSH	25	c. 20 Jul 1990	c. 01 May 2012			BTH165	BH145	BIH185	BCH125	247	138t	77m	Add BIH185, new build; regain BTH165 ex "SH"27.	Fitted with new sliding doors and locks by December 1999.
VSH	25	c. 01 May 2012	14 Nov 2012		BTH165	BH145	BIH185	BIH181	BCH125	314	171t	96m	Add BIH181 ex Newport	
"VSH"	25	14 Nov 2012	26 Nov 2012			BTH165	BIH185	BIH181	BCH125	251	137t	77m	Remove BH145 to Set #28	
SH	25	26 Nov 2012	c. 2022				BTH165	BIH185	BCH125	184	104t	58m	Remove BIH181 to Set #21	Paired with SH30
SSH	25	c. 2022	Until withdrawal	BTH170	BIH190	BCH130	BTH165	BIH185	BCH125	368	208t	116m	Absorbed SH30	
SH	26	02 Aug 1984	09 Jul 1999				BTH166	BH146	BCH126	180	105t	58m	As Built	
VSH	26	09 Jul 1999	01 Nov 2012		BTH166	BIH188	BH146	BIH192	BCH126	314	171t	96m	Add BIH188 ex Set #28, add BIH192 ex Set #35. Repainted red.	Provide high capacity head end power cables, sliding doors and door locks. Fitted with rubber inter-carriage diaphragms in 2010.
SSH	26	01 Nov 2012	c. 2022	BTH166	BH143	BIH188	BH146	BIH192	BCH126	377	205t	116m	Add BH143 ex Set #23	
SSH	26	c. 2022	Until withdrawal	BTH166	BH143	BIH188	BH146	BIH192	BCH126	377	205t	116m	Repainted	
SH	27	10 Oct 1984	By 01 Aug 1987				BTH167	BH147	BCH127	180	105t	58m	As Built	
"SH"	27	By 01 Aug 1987	By 04 Dec 1987			BTH161	BCH122	BTH162	BCH127	234	142t	77m	Lose BH147 & BTH167 to SH21; gain BTH162 and BCH122 ex SH22 and BTH161 ex SH21	
"SH"	27	By 04 Dec 1987	17 Jul 1989			BTH165	BCH122	BTH162	BCH127	234	142t	77m	Add BTH165 ex SH25, lose BTH161 to SH21	
"SH"	27	c. 02 Aug 1989	20 Jul 1990				BTH167	BH147	BCH127	180	105t	58m	Lose BCH122, BTH162 to Set #22; lose BTH165 to Set #25; gain BH147, BTH147 from Set #25	
FSH	27	20 Jul 1990	01 Dec 1996			BTH167	BH147	BIH187	BCH127	247	138t	77m	Add BIH187 new build	
FSH	27	01 Dec 1996	01 Dec 2004			BTH167	BH147	BIH187	BCH127	247	138t	77m	Repainted	
SH	27	01 Dec 2004	01 Mar 2005				BTH167	BH147	BCH127	180	105t	58m	Remove BIH187 to Newport	
FSH	27	01 Mar 2005	01 Oct 2006			BTH167	BH147	BIH187	BCH127	247	138t	77m	Add BIH187 ex Newport	
"FSH"	27	01 Oct 2006	01 Nov 2012				BTH167	BH147	BCH127	180	105t	58m	Remove BIH187 to #28	
SH	27	01 Nov 2012	c. 2022				BTH167	BH147	BCH127	180	105t	58m		Paired with SH21
SSH	27	c. 2022	Until withdrawal	BTH175	BIH186	BCH135	BTH167	BIH147	BCH127	374	209t	116m	Absorbed SH35	Stored Shepparton late July 2023; to Newport November 2023
SH	28	29 May 1985	30 Oct 1985				BTH168	BH148	BCH128	180	105t	58m	As Built	
SH	28	30 Oct 1985	By 27 Mar 1986			BTH168	BH148	BH141	BCH128	247			Gain BH141 ex SH21, due to set LH33 not permitted in service.	
SH	28	By 27 Mar 1986	By 24 Jun 1992				BTH168	BH148	BCH128	180	105t	58m	Restored to original configuration	
FSH	28	By 24 Jun 1992	Post 7 September 1999			BTH168	BH148	BIH188	BCH128	247	138t	77m	Add BIH188 ex Set #31	
SH	28	Post 07 Sep 1999	03 Apr 2006				BTH168	BH148	BCH128	180	105t	58m	Remove BIH188 to Set #26	
FSH	28	03 Apr 2006	01 Nov 2012			BTH168	BH148	BIH194	BCH128	247	138t	77m	Add BIH194 ex Set #34	
SSH	28	01 Nov 2012	c. 2021	BTH168	BH145	BIH194	BH148	BIH187	BCH128	377	205t	116m	Add BH145 ex Set #25, BIH187 ex Set #27	
SSH	28	c. 2021	Until withdrawal	BTH168	BH145	BIH194	BH148	BIH187	BCH128	377	205t	116m	Repainted	Stored Shepparton late July 2023; to Newport November 2023
SH	29	19 Dec 1984	26 Jun 1992				BTH169	BH149	BCH129	180	105t	58m	As Built	
FSH	29	26 Jun 1992	14 Jul 1999			BTH169	BH149	BIH189	BCH129	247	138t	77m	Add BIH189, new build	
VSH	29	14 Jul 1999	01 Nov 2012		BCH135	BTH175	BTH169	BIH189	BCH129	311	175t	97m	Remove BH149 to Set #22, add BCH135 & BTH175 ex Set #35. Repainted red by October 2000.	Briefly ran as orange VSH with original cables, so only one airconditioning unit on BH149 and BIH182 was in service to limit power draw. Re-entered workshops for provision of power doors and locks, high capacity cables, and repainting to red after 9 July 1999
SH	29	01 Nov 2012	c. 2022				BTH169	BIH189	BCH129	184	104t	58m	Remove BCH135 & BTH175 to Set #35	Paired with SH35
SH	29	c. 2022	Until withdrawal										Set absorbed into SSH23	
SH	30	06 May 1984	25 Jun 1992				BTH170	BH150	BCH130	180	105t	58m	As Built	
SH	30	25 Jun 1992	c. 2003				BTH170	BIH190	BCH130	184	104t	58m	Add BIH190, new build; Remove BH150, convert to BTH174	
SH	30	c. 2003	?				BTH170	BIH190	BCH130	184	104t	58m	Repainted	
SH	30	?	c. 2022				BTH170	BIH190	BCH130	184	104t	58m	Repainted	Paired with SH25
SH	30	c. 2022	Until withdrawal										Set absorbed into SSH25	
SH	31	14 Aug 1985	01 Oct 1990				BTH171	BH151	BCH131	180	105t	58m	As Built	
SH	31	01 Oct 1990	01 Aug 1991				BTH171	BIH181	BCH131	182	105t	58m	Lose BH151, gain BIH181	
SH	31	01 Aug 1991	24 Jun 1992				BTH171	BH151	BCH131	180	105t	58m	Gain BH151, lose BIH188	
SH	31	29 Sep 1990	24 Jun 1992				BTH171	BIH188	BCH131	184	104t	58m	Add BIH188, new build; lose BH151 to Set #34	
SH	31	24 Jun 1992	c. 2000				BTH171	BIH191	BCH131	184	104t	58m	Add BIH191, new build; lose BIH188 to Set #28	
SH	31	c. 2000	c. 2008				BTH171	BIH191	BCH131	184	104t	58m	Repainted	
SH	31	c. 2008	c. 2022				BTH171	BIH191	BCH131	184	104t	58m	Repainted	Paired with LH33
SSH	31	c. 2022	Until withdrawal	BTH174	BIH193	BCH134	BTH171	BIH191	BCH131	374	209t	116m	Absorbed SH34	Stored Echuca circa November 2023
LH	32	08 Mar 1985	By 01 Aug 1987				BTH172	BH152	BCH132	249	118t	70m	As Built	
"LH"	32	By 01 Aug 1987	By 29 Jun 1989			BTH172	BH142	BH152	BCH132	316	151t	90m	Add BH142 ex SH22.	
LH	32	By 29 Jun 1989	c. 01 Sep 1999			BTH172	BH152	BIH186	BCH132	316	151t	90m	Lose BH142 to SH22; add BH186 new build.	
FLH	32	c. 01 Sep 1999	30 Apr 2006			BTH172	BH152	BIH186	BCH132	316	151t	90m	Repainted	
VLH	32	01 May 2006	01 Nov 2012		BCH134	BTH174	BTH172	BH152	BCH132	376	189t	109m	Remove BIH186 to Set #33, add BCH134 & BTH174 to Set #34	First roster Roster #8306 & #8323 M-F (0701 up / 1732 down SEY)
LH	32	01 Nov 2012	c. 2022				BTH172	BH152	BCH132	249	118t	70m	Remove BCH134 & BTH174 to Set #34	Paired with SH34
SLH	32	c. 2022	c. 2023	BTH169	BIH189	BCH129	BTH172	BH152	BCH132	433	222t	128m	Absorbed SH29	
SLH	32	c. 2023	02 Feb 2024	BTH165	BIH185	BCH125	BTH172	BH152	BCH132	433	222t	128m	Absorbed SH25 in lieu of SH29	After withdrawal, SH25 to Steamranger, LH32 remains in Victoria
LH	33	28 Feb 1986	03 Jul 1992				BTH173	BH153	BCH133	249	118t	70m	As Built	Fitted with Socimi bogies, allowed to run at 160 km/h
FLH	33	03 Jul 1992	01 Jun 1996			BTH173	BH153	BIH193	BCH133	316	151t	90m	Add BIH193, new build	
FLH	33	01 Jun 1996	01 Apr 2006			BTH173	BH153	BIH193	BCH133	316	151t	90m	Repainted	Fitted with new sliding doors and locks by December 1999.
VLH	33	01 Apr 2006	01 Nov 2012		BTH173	BIH186	BH153	BIH193	BCH133	383	184t	109m	Add BIH186 ex Set #32	Position of BIH186 unclear
LH	33	01 Nov 2012	c. 2022				BTH173	BH153	BCH133	249	118t	70m	BIH186 to Set #35, BIH193 to Set #34	Paired with SH31
SLH	33	c. 2022	02 Feb 2024	BTH161	BIH181	BCH121	BTH173	BH153	BCH133	433	222t	128m	Absorbed SH21	After withdrawal, SH21 to Steamranger, LH33 remains in Victoria
SH	34	04 Oct 1990	10 Jul 1992				BCH135	BH151	BCH134	191	105t	58m	As Built; BH151 ex Set #31	Set used BH151 in lieu of BIH181 because BCH134, BCH135 did not yet have toilets installed.
SH	34	10 Jul 1992	03 Apr 2006				BTH174	BIH194	BCH134	194	104t	58m	BH150 ex Set #30 converted to BTH174; BIH194 new build; BH151 converted to BTH175 in Set #35.	
SH	34	03 Apr 2006	01 Nov 2012							Nil	Nil	Nil	Split - BIH194 to #28; BCH134+BTH174 to #32	
SH	34	01 Nov 2012	c. 2022				BCH134	BIH193	BTH174	190	105t	58m	Reformed - BIH193 ex #33; BCH134+BTH174 ex #32	Reversed; paired with LH32
SH	34	c. 2022	Until withdrawal										Set absorbed into SSH31	
SH	35	10 Jul 1992	01 Sep 1999				BTH175	BIH192	BCH135	194	104t	58m	First formed; BIH192 new build, BTH175 ex BH151 previously in set SH34	
SH	35	14 Jul 1999	01 Nov 2012							Nil	Nil	Nil	Split - BIH192 to #26; BCH135+BTH175 to #29	
SH	35	01 Nov 2012	c. 2022				BCH135	BIH186	BTH175	194	104t	58m	Reformed - BIH186 ex #33; BCH135+BTH175 ex #29	Reversed; paired with SH29
SH	35	c. 2022	Until withdrawal										Set absorbed into SSH27	
MTH	101	18 Jun 1984	c. 1990						MTH101	63	39t	19m	As Built	
MTH	101	c. 1990	01 Oct 1995						MTH101	63	39t	19m	Repainted	
MTH	101	01 Oct 1995	Until withdrawal						MTH101	63	39t	19m	Repainted	Stored since 26 April 2008
MTH	102	29 Jun 1984	c. 1990						MTH102	63	39t	19m	As Built	
MTH	102	c. 1990	01 Nov 1995						MTH102	63	39t	19m	Repainted	
MTH	102	01 Nov 1995	26 Apr 2008						MTH102	63	39t	19m	Repainted	Stored from 26 April 2008
IEV	102	07 Dec 2011	?.						IEV102	Nil	39t	19m	Modified ex MTH102	Track and Overhead inspection vehicle; restricted to 80 km/h
MTH	103	27 Jul 1984	c. 1990						MTH103	63	39t	19m	As Built	
MTH	103	c. 1990	01 Sep 1995						MTH103	63	39t	19m	Repainted	
MTH	103	01 Sep 1995	26 Apr 2008						MTH103	63	39t	19m	Repainted	Stored since 26 April 2008
MTH	104	21 Aug 1984	01 Aug 1989						MTH104	63	39t	19m	As Built	
MTH	104	01 Aug 1989	01 Dec 1995						MTH104	63	39t	19m	Repainted	
MTH	104	01 Dec 1995	26 Apr 2008						MTH104	63	39t	19m	Repainted	Stored since 26 April 2008
