= V/Line P class =

Class of diesel locomotives used in Australia

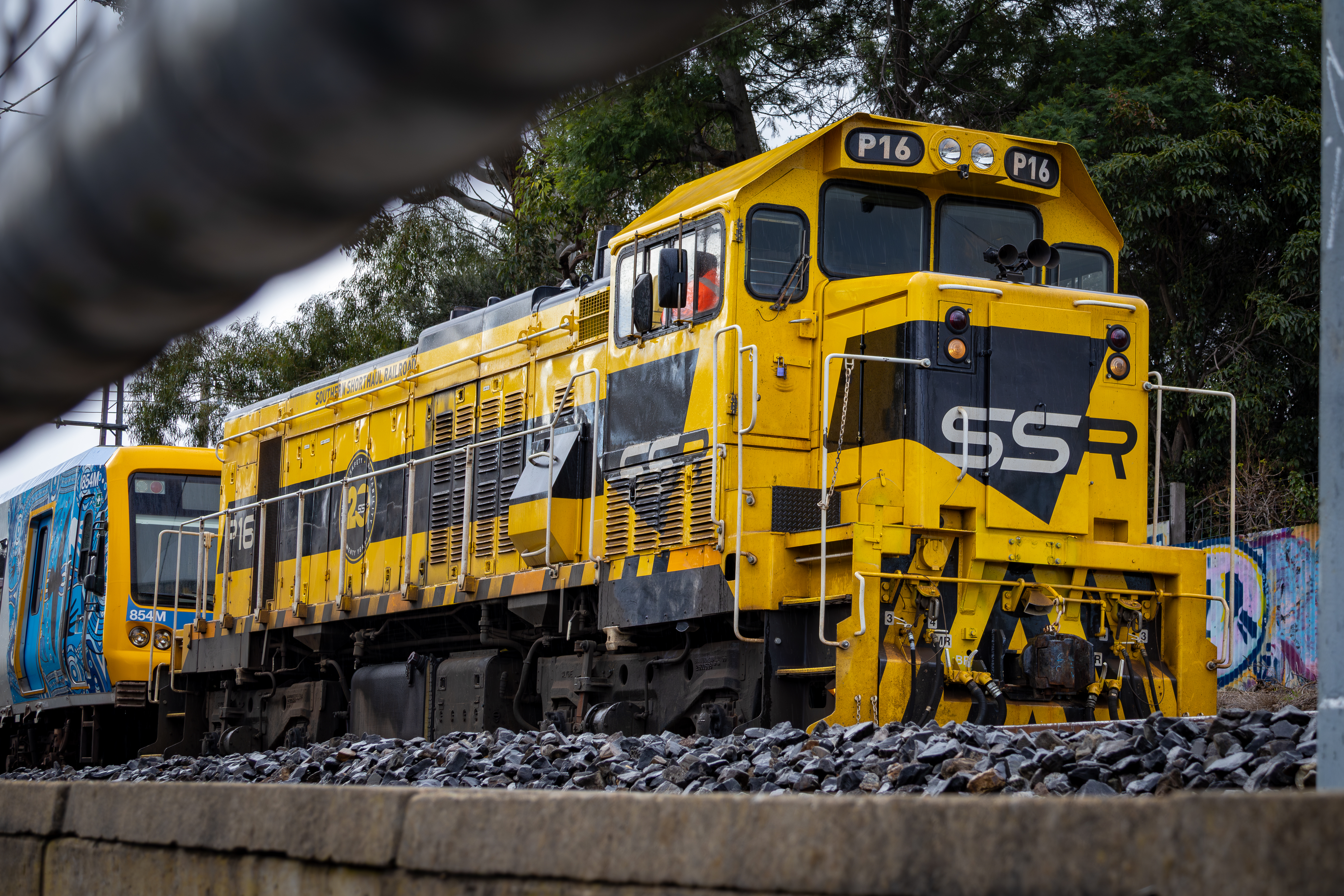
- SSR P16 hauling X'Trapolis 854M in Clifton Hill, July 2025
Type and origin
- Power type: Diesel-electric
- Builder: Clyde Engineering, Somerton
- Model: EMD G18HBR
- Build date: 1984–1985
- Total produced: 13
Specifications
- Gauge: 1,600 mm (5 ft 3 in); 1,435 mm (4 ft 8 1/2 in)
- Length: 14.55 m (47 ft 9 in)
- Fuel type: Diesel
- Prime mover: EMD 8-645E
- Generator: EMD D15ER
- Traction motors: EMD D29
Performance figures
- Maximum speed: 100 km/h (62 mph)
- Power output: 820 kW (1,100 hp)
Career
- Operators: V/Line, Southern Shorthaul Railroad
- Number in class: 13
- Numbers: P11–P23
- Preserved: Three: P13, P19, P20
- Current owner: 707 Operations; Seymour Railway Heritage Centre; Southern Shorthaul Railroad
- Disposition: 9 in service, 1 stored and 3 preserved

The P class are a class of diesel locomotives rebuilt from T class locomotives by Clyde Engineering, Somerton for V/Line in 1984–1985.

== History ==
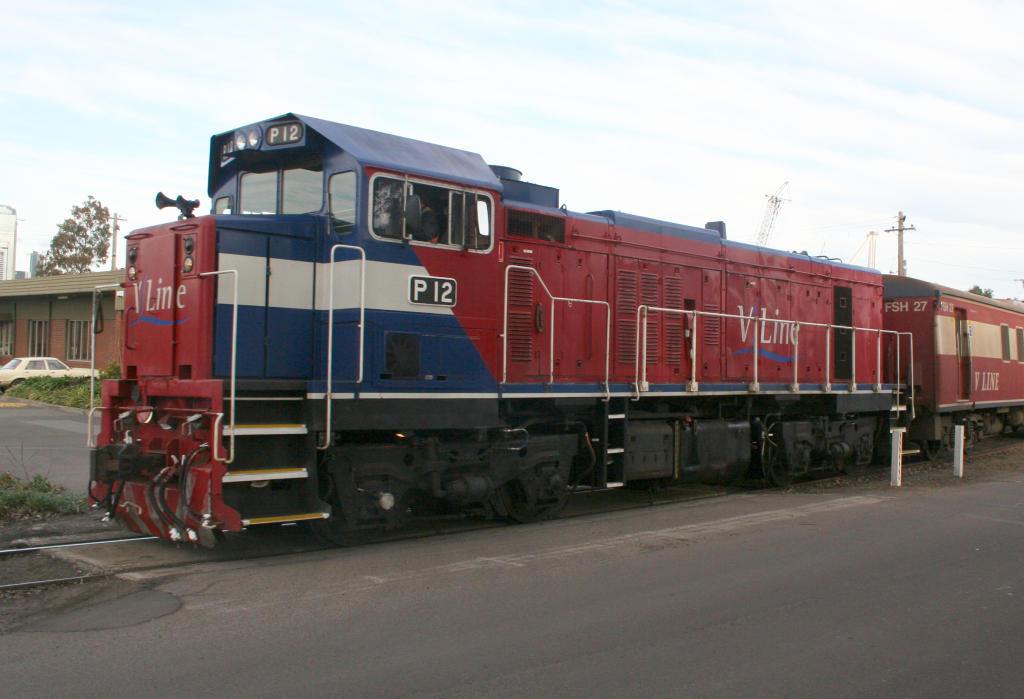
V/Line P12 at North Melbourne in August 2007

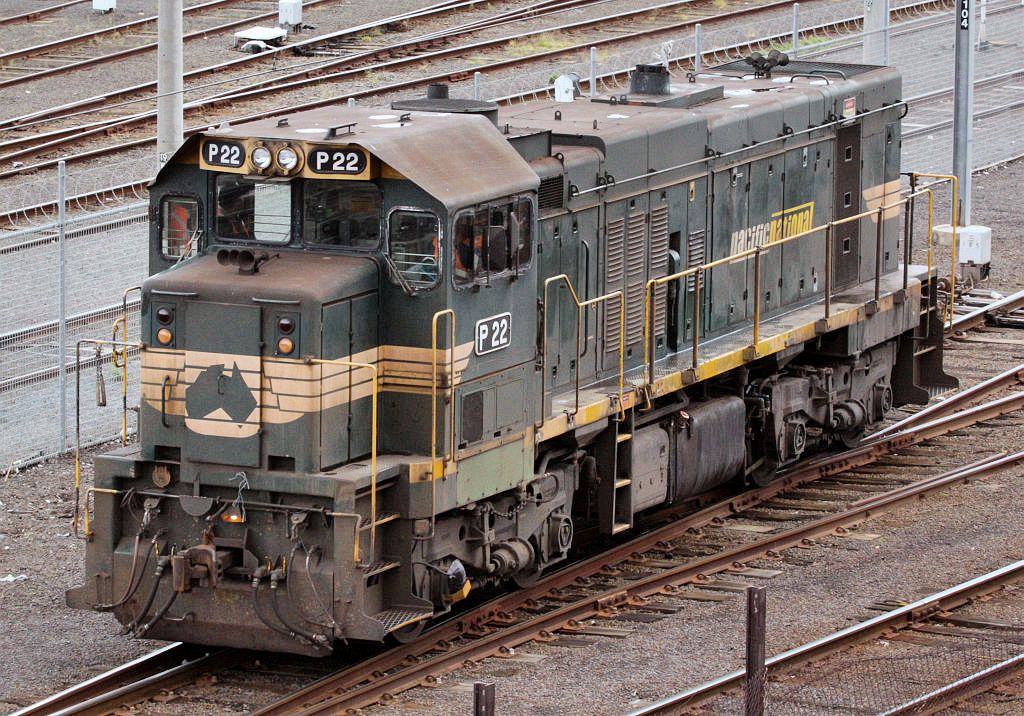
Freight Australia P22 at North Melbourne in April 2010

The P class were rebuilt from Victorian Railways first series T class locomotives by Clyde Engineering for V/line. The rebuild involved a new cab and carbody, replacing the EMD 8-567C engine with an EMD 8-645E, replacement of the main generator and traction motors, and the inclusion a head end power (HEP) generator.

In the early 1980s, V/line were looking to modernize Victorian passenger services. with the intended introduction of H type carriages, V/line needed a locomotive to pull them. it was decided that it was more economical to rebuild existing locomotives to modern specifications then completely new locomotives. V/line decided to rebuild first-series T Class locomotives to modern specifications. The reasons behind this were that the T class locomotives had become life expired and the frames of the locomotives had ample space to mount a HEP generator. 13 First series T classes would be rebuilt at Clyde Engineering's Somerton, Victoria plant to P class specifications. The rebuild involved a new cab and carbody, replacing the EMD 8-567C engine with an EMD 8-645E, replacement of the main generator and traction motors, and the inclusion of a head end power (HEP) generator.

When built, P class locomotives were most commonly used in either a push-pull mode with H type carriages or operated as single locomotives with a 3-4 carriage train. The P classes also saw use on revenue freight services. In freight service, the head end power was occasionally used for the powering of refrigerated containers.

By September 2017, all of V/Line's P class locomotives had been withdrawn from regular passenger service, having been replaced by the VLocity diesel multiple units. In 2019, Southern Shorthaul Railroad acquired five P class locomotives from V/Line. Initially the acquired units remained in V/Line livery, but with the V/Line logos removed and replaced with the SSR logo. Starting in 2022 the 5 units SSR had acquired at the time would be progressively repainted into the SSR Yellow and Black livery, with all units being painted by late 2023.

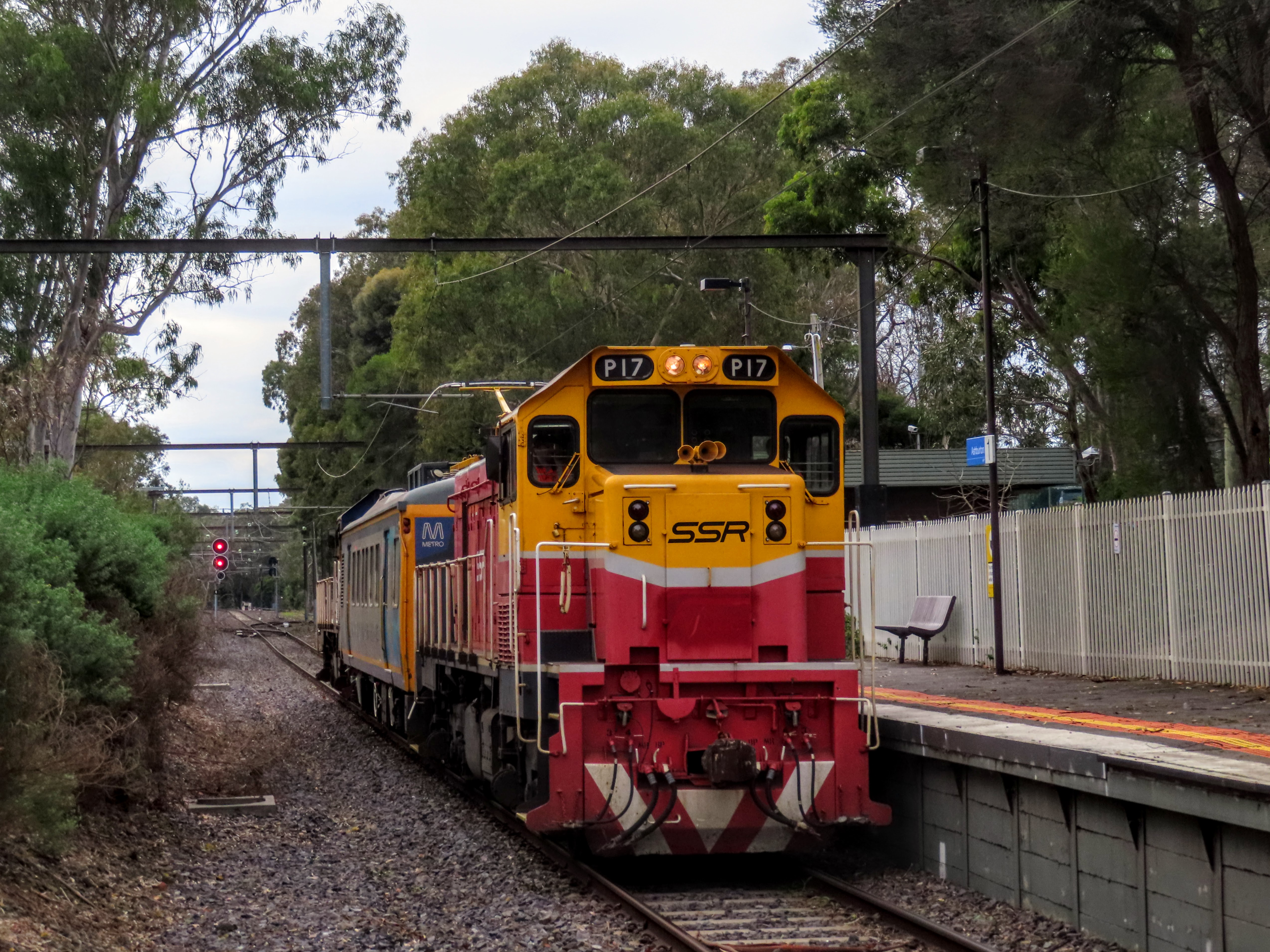
P17-IEV102-P18 at Ashburton on an overhead inspection run to Alamein

Up until November 2024 V/Line had retained P12, P13 and P15 for use as standby and for-hire locomotives. However SSR has since also acquired P12 and 15 and 707 Operations acquired P13 from V/Line for preservation, marking the end of any P class locomotives being under V/Line ownership. As of 2025 Ettamogah Rail Hub has three P class locomotives stored, 2 of which were leased to Seymour Railway Heritage Centre where they were reactivated and painted into the Victorian Railways blue and yellow paint scheme, and SRHC has since acquired P19 from ERH for preservation. P20 has also gone into preservation with 707 Operations, having been donated the locomotive by Pacific National in January 2024.

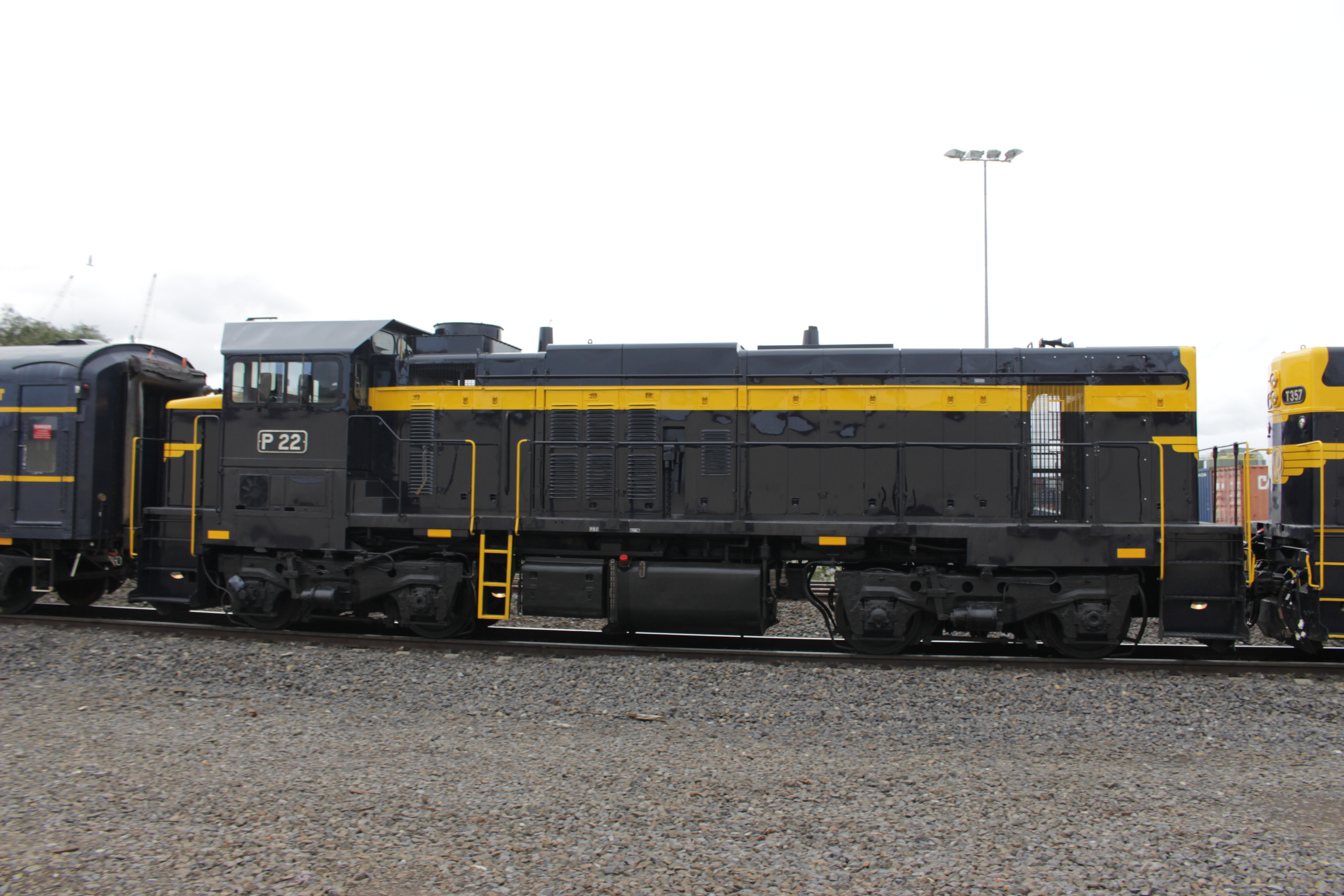
P22 Sims Street Junction

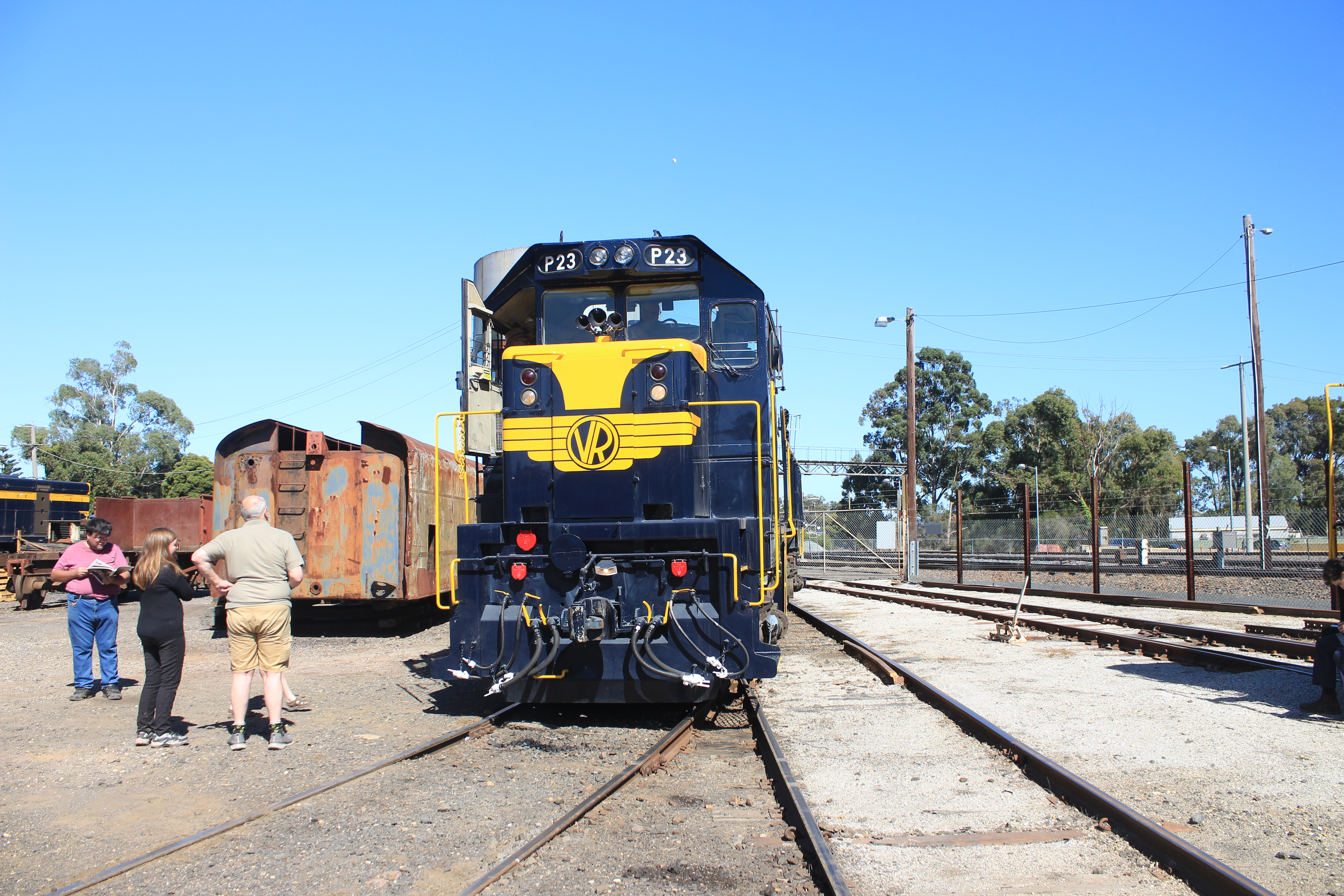
P23 at Seymour Rail Heritage Centre

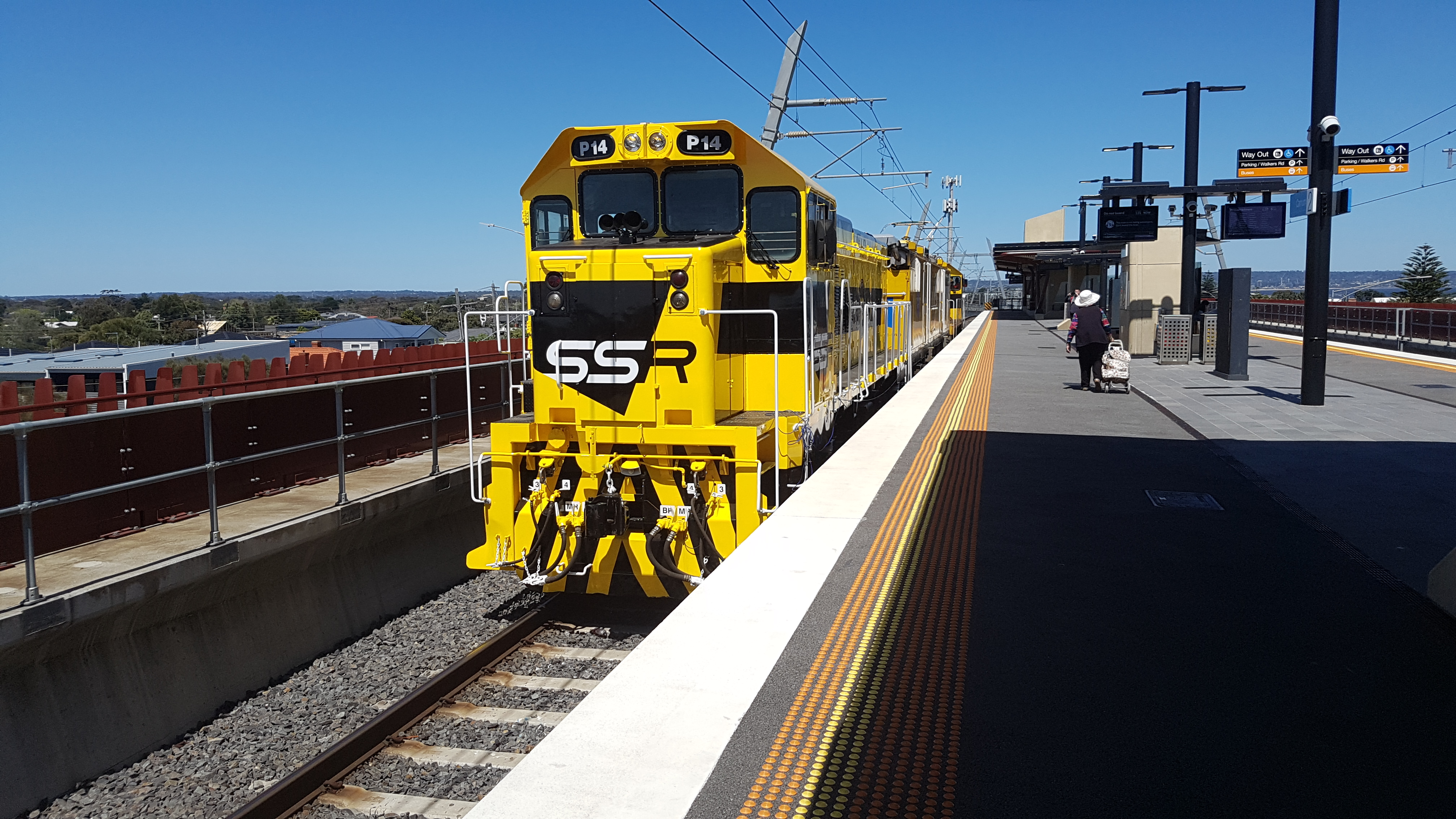
P14 in SSR livery doing an Overhead evaluation run at Carrum

== Status table ==
Key:	In Service	Stored	Preserved	Converted	Under Overhaul	Scrapped

Locomotive	Pre-conversion	Entered service (T)	Re-entered service (P)	Owner(s)	Current livery	Current status	Gauge	Notes
P11	T336	9 May 1956	5 June 1984	V/Line (Rebuilt), V/Line Passenger (1995), Southern Shorthaul Railroad (2019)	V/Line Mk3	Stored, North Bendigo	1,600 mm (5 ft 3 in) broad gauge	Ran the last V/Line Sunbury passenger and Leongatha freight trains
P12	T329	18 June 1956	7 June 1984	V/Line (Rebuilt), V/Line Passenger (1995), Southern Shorthaul Railroad (2024)	V/Line Mk3 without logos	In Service	1,600 mm (5 ft 3 in) broad gauge	Ran 707ops charter with R707 & P15 26 November 2023
P13	T340	30 October 1956	10 July 1984	V/Line (Rebuilt), V/Line Passenger (1995), 707 Operations (2024)	V/Line Mk2	Preserved - Operational	1,435 mm (4 ft 8½ in) standard gauge	Ownership transferred to 707 Operations in November 2024
P14	T330	2 July 1956	1 August 1984	V/Line (Rebuilt), V/Line Passenger (1995), Southern Shorthaul Railroad (2019)	SSR Yellow and Black	In service	1,600 mm (5 ft 3 in) broad gauge	
P15	T344	9 December 1956	22 October 1984	V/Line (Rebuilt), V/Line Passenger (1995), Southern Shorthaul Railroad (2024)	V/Line Mk3 without logos	In Service	1,600 mm (5 ft 3 in) broad gauge	Ran 707ops Charter with R707 & P12 26 Dec 23
P16	T332	22 July 1956	23 November 1984	V/Line (Rebuilt), V/Line Passenger (1995), Southern Shorthaul Railroad (2019)	SSR Yellow and Black	In service	1,600 mm (5 ft 3 in) broad gauge	
P17	T327	28 May 1956	19 December 1984	V/Line (Rebuilt), V/Line Passenger (1995), Southern Shorthaul Railroad (2019)	SSR Yellow and Black	In service	1,600 mm (5 ft 3 in) broad gauge	
P18	T339	7 October 1956	15 February 1985	V/Line (Rebuilt), V/Line Passenger (1995), Southern Shorthaul Railroad (2019)	SSR Yellow and Black	In service	1,600 mm (5 ft 3 in) broad gauge	Ran both the last V/Line Leongatha and Sunbury passenger trains.
P19	T331	2 July 1956	26 March 1985	V/Line (Rebuilt), V/Line Freight (1995), FV/FA (1999/2000), PN (2004), Ettamogah Rail Hub (2015), Seymour Railway Heritage Centre (2025)	Freight Australia Green and Yellow with Pacific National Logos	Stored	1,600 mm (5 ft 3 in) broad gauge	Acquired by SRHC from Ettamogah Rail Hub for preservation in February 2025
P20	T337	23 September 1956	29 May 1985	V/Line (Rebuilt), V/Line Freight (1995), FV/FA (1999/2000), PN (2004), 707 Operations (2023)	V/Line Orange and Grey	Preserved - Operational	1,600 mm (5 ft 3 in) broad gauge	Noted as having revolving quartz halogen lights added at each end. Donated to 707 Operations in 2023 and returned to service on 14 September 2024.
P21	T338	23 September 1956	27 June 1985	V/Line (Rebuilt), V/Line Freight (1995), FV/FA (1999/2000), PN (2004), Ettamogah Rail Hub (2015), Southern Shorthaul Railroad (2025)	Freight Australia Green and Yellow with Pacific National Logos	In service	1,600 mm (5 ft 3 in) broad gauge	
P22	T328	18 June 1956	11 September 1985	V/Line (Rebuilt), V/Line Freight (1995), FV/FA (1999/2000), PN (2004), Seymour Rail Heritage Centre (2015), Ettamogah Rail Hub (2024), Southern Shorthaul Railroad (2025)	VR Blue and Gold with SSR Logos	In service	1,600 mm (5 ft 3 in) broad gauge	
P23	T326	28 May 1956	11 September 1985	V/Line (Rebuilt), V/Line Freight (1995), FV/FA (1999/2000), PN (2004), Seymour Rail Heritage Centre (2015), Ettamogah Rail Hub (2024), Southern Shorthaul Railroad (2025)	VR Blue and Gold with SSR Logos	In service	1,600 mm (5 ft 3 in) broad gauge	
