= V/Line A class =

Class of diesel locomotives used in Australia

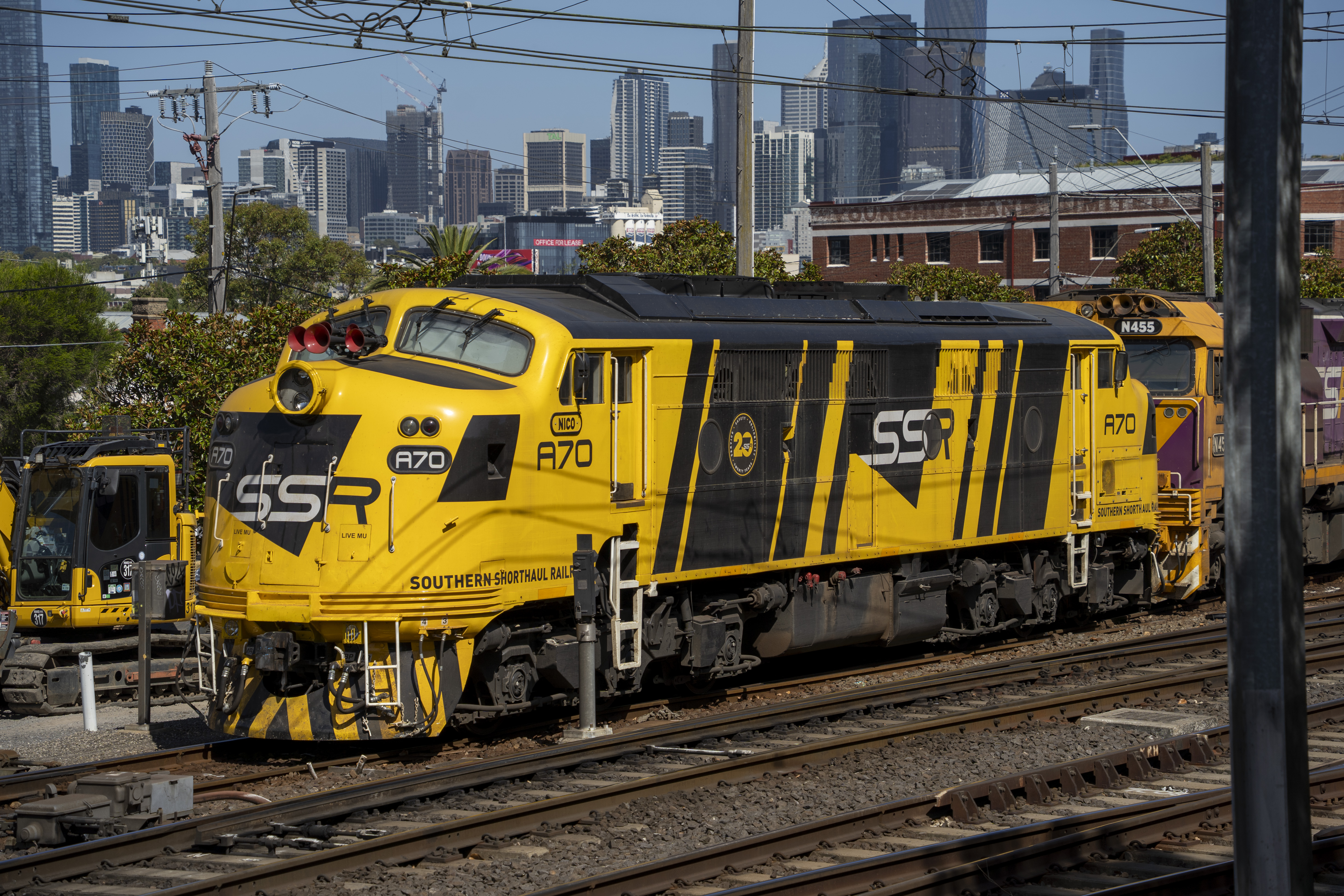
- Southern Shorthaul Railroad A70 at Kensington in February 2026
Type and origin
- Power type: Diesel-electric
- Builder: Clyde Engineering, Rosewater
- Model: EMD AAT22C-2R
- Build date: 1984–1985
- Total produced: 11
Specifications
- Configuration
  - AAR: C-C
  - UIC: Co-Co
- Gauge: 1,600 mm (5 ft 3 in)
- Wheel diameter: 40 in (100 cm)
- Length: 60 ft 10 in (18.54 m)
- Width: 9 ft 9 in (2.98 m)
- Height: 14 ft 0 in (4.27 m)
- Loco weight: 120 long tons (120 t)
- Fuel type: Diesel
- Fuel capacity: 1,000 imp gal (4,540 L)
- Lubricant cap.: 137 imp gal (625 L)
- Coolant cap.: 154 imp gal (698 L)
- Prime mover: EMD 12-645E3B
- RPM range: 200–950 rpm
  - RPM low idle: 200
  - RPM idle: 200
- Engine type: Two-stroke diesel engine
- Aspiration: Turbocharged
- Generator: EMD AR10-A4-D18 (Replaced with CA5)
- Traction motors: EMD D57 (Replaced with D78)
- Cylinders: 12
- Transmission: Diesel-electric
- Train heating: Head-end power
Performance figures
- Maximum speed: 83 mph (133 km/h)
- Power output: 2,476 hp (1,846 kW)
- Tractive effort: Starting 66,094 lbf (294 kN); Continuous 47,659 lbf (212 kN)
Career
- Operators: V/Line, Southern Shorthaul Railroad
- Class: V/Line A Class
- Number in class: 11
- Numbers: A60–A85 (with gaps)
- Locale: Victoria, Australia
- First run: May 1984
- Last run: August 2018
- Retired: May 2014 (PN), August 2018 (V/Line)
- Preserved: Three: A60, A62 and A78
- Current owner: V/Line; Southern Shorthaul Railroad
- Disposition: 3 preserved, 2 in service, 6 scrapped

The A class are a class of diesel locomotives rebuilt from Victorian Railways B class locomotives by Clyde Engineering, Rosewater in South Australia for V/Line in 1984–1985.

== History ==
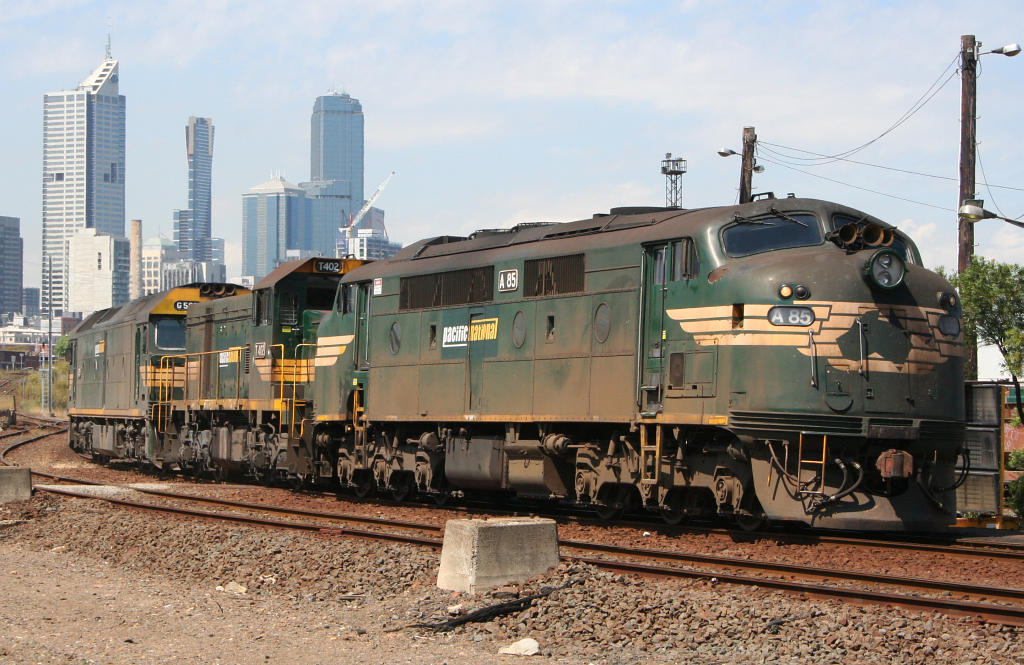
Freight Australia liveried A85 with Pacific National decals in Melbourne in February 2007

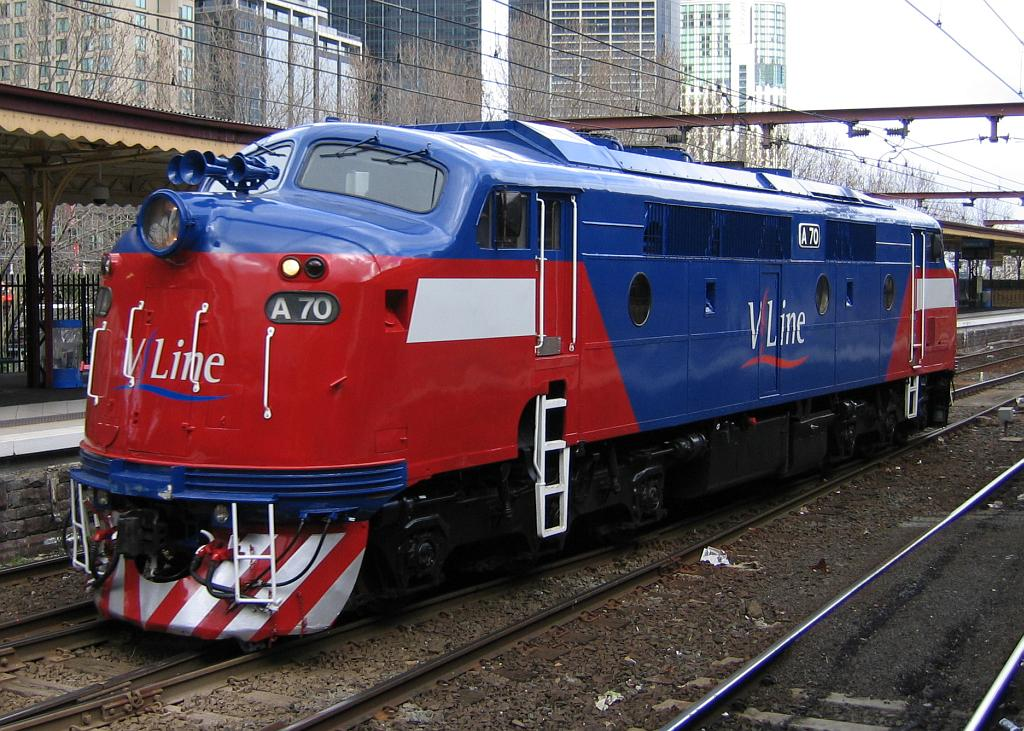
V/Line liveried A70 at Flinders Street in August 2006

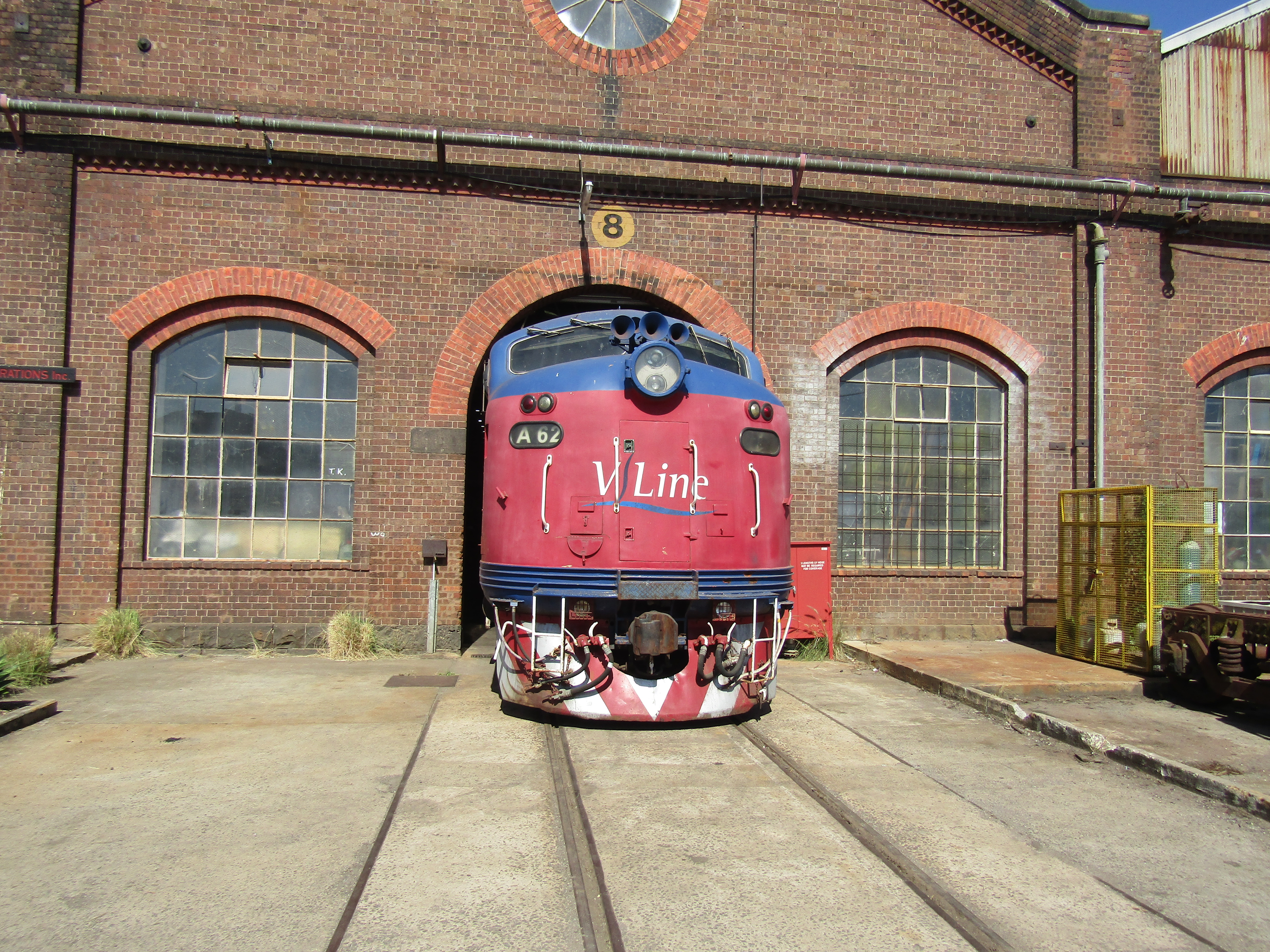
A62 prior to restoration by 707 Operations at Newport Workshops in March 2022

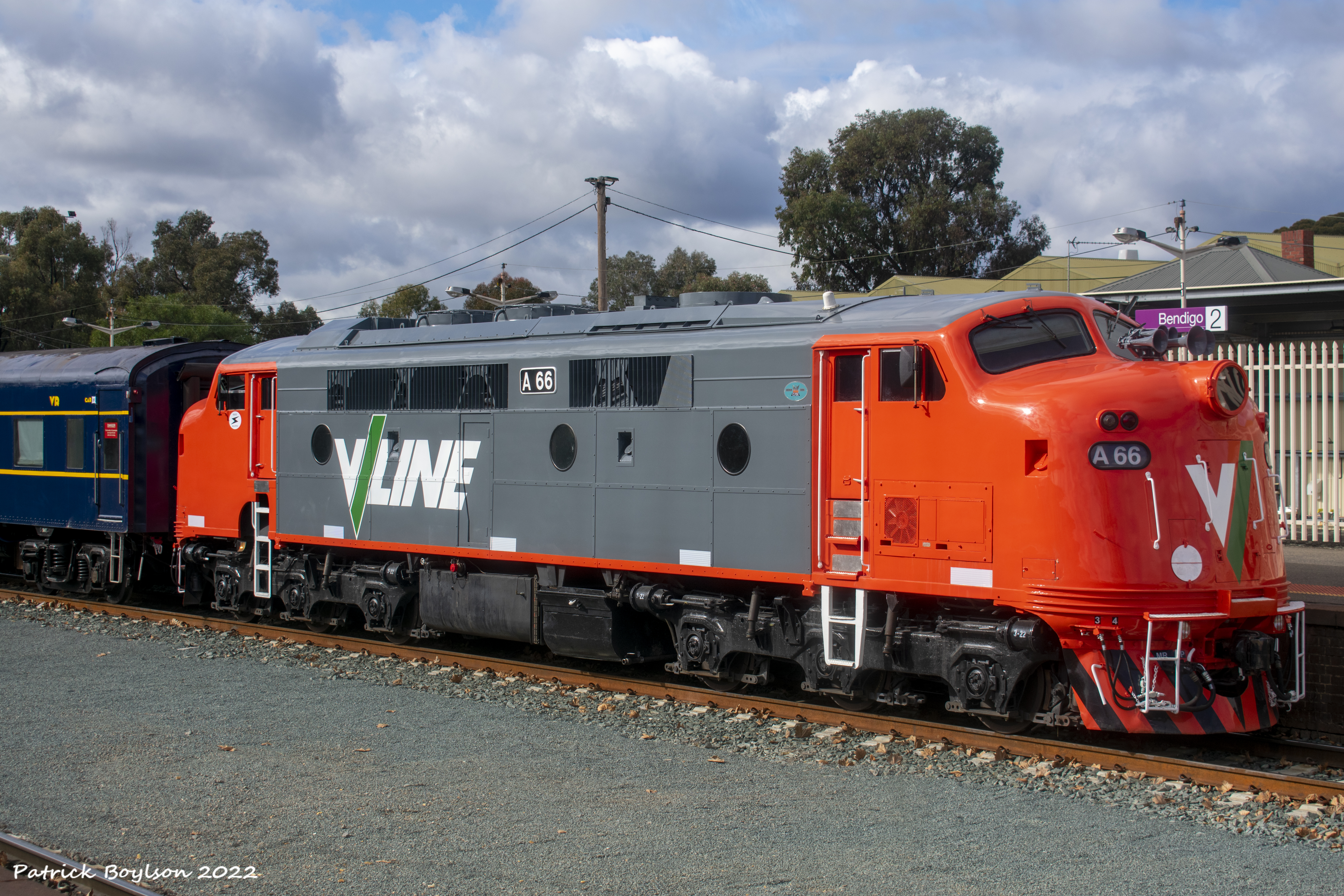
V/Line MK1 Livery A66 at Bendigo Station - July 2022

The class were rebuilt from B class locomotives originally constructed in the 1950s, as part of the New Deal reforms of passenger rail operations in Victoria. The rebuild contract was let in January 1983 to Clyde Engineering, Rosewater with the first locomotive entering service in May 1984, but the project was abandoned in mid 1985 after rising costs due to structural fatigue, with the 11th rebuild delivered in August 1985. It was decided to instead build more of the N class locomotives, mechanically similar to the A class. The major difference was the addition of head end power generators, as it was believed this was a more efficient way of supplying power for air-conditioning and lighting than power vans or individual generator sets under carriages.

Four locomotives were named after Australian rules football players in September 1984, while A60 was named after former railway commissioner Harold Clapp. In July 1986, A85 was regeared for 160 km/h (99 mph) operation, and tested between Glenorchy and Lubeck, to test an H type carriage set fitted with high speed bogies, but was returned to the standard 133 km/h (83 mph) gearing soon after.

In late 1986 the engines were cycled through Bendigo Workshops for fireproofing of the side panels.

In preparation for the transitioning of V/Line services to private ownership, four were allocated to passenger services and seven to freight services.

When the engines were initially converted from B class units they were intended for light, high speed passenger traffic, but in Freight Australia service this had limited value. The engine frames could not be easily reinforced, but by 2002 the D57 traction motors were swapped for D77, which raised the current axle from 825A to 1050A. To better make use of the increased power the gear ratios in each unit were changed from 59:18 to 61:16, improving adhesion and overall providing an increase in tractive effort of 35%. The lower-power traction motors were cascaded to the Y Class fleet.

The V/Line units were not upgraded in this way, and continued to operate in regular service supplementing the N Class locomotives on mainline services. Another fixed roster was to Stony Point, as the MTH carriages allocated to that service were fitted with on-board head-end-power generators. The A class locomotives were supposed to run their last mainline passenger services in 2013, with A60 operating what was supposed to be the final service, the 16:15 Southern Cross to Bacchus Marsh on 24 April 2013. However, due to a shortage of N class locomotives V/Line briefly reactivated A70 in 2014, with all four locomotives in the V/Line passenger fleet having since been withdrawn. Pacific National withdrew its last examples in May 2014.

In August 2015 three of the four A class locomotives were put into long-term storage, with V/Line continuing to operate A66 in revenue service, where it used to operate on the interurban service to Bacchus Marsh on a regular basis operating in peak times. By August 2018 however, timetable alterations had seen the loco no longer required on the Bacchus Marsh services and A66 was subsequently sent to Bendigo Roundhouse and later Melbourne in dry storage as an emergency locomotive. In mid 2022 the engine re-entered service, having been repainted in V/Line Orange and Grey.

During the time period of 7 and 18 January 2019, Pacific National units A73, A77, A81 and A85 were scrapped at South Dynon broad gauge turntable. In May 2019, Pacific National scrapped A71 and A79 at Melbourne Freight Terminal to further clear out redundant assets at Dynon Workshops. Currently, A78 is the last remaining ex-Freight Australia / Pacific National A class locomotive remaining which has been stored in North Bendigo Workshops with an uncertain future.

Two of the three remaining V/Line A class locomotives that were in long-term storage at South Dynon Locomotive Depot have since been allocated to heritage preservation, they are locomotives A60 and A62 due to their significance and contributions to the Victorian Railways which marked many historical milestones. A60 (formerly B60) being the first the Victorian Railways mainline diesel-electric locomotive, which also has been named after the Victorian Railway commissioner Sir Harold Clapp, and A62 (formerly B62) being the first diesel-electric locomotive to hit a million miles within the Victorian Railway system. It too has been named in honor of the railway employees of the Victorian Railways. A60 has been allocated to Seymour Railway Heritage Centre while A62 has been allocated to 707 Operations. The respective transfers of the two locomotives took place on 6 June 2020. The third and last of these locos, A70 was transferred from South Dynon to Newport Workshops on 24 June 2022. A70 was acquired by Southern Shorthaul Railroad in September 2023, who transferred it from Newport Workshops to Bendigo to undergo reactivation. This was complete by late-2024 and by January 2025 the locomotive was undergoing testing, running in its first full freight consist on 5 February 2025.

== Livery ==
The class were delivered in the V/Line orange and tangerine scheme. In February 1988, A66 which was painted in a green and gold livery to celebrate the Australian Bicentenary, later appearing in a second special livery to advertise the Melbourne bid for the 1996 Olympic Games. For most of the 2000s and 2010s, the class appeared in either the 1995 red and blue or 2008 red and yellow V/Line Passenger liveries, or the green and yellow Freight Australia livery with Pacific National logos.

In 2022, A66 was repainted into the as-built V/Line orange and grey livery. A62 was repainted into the same livery in 2024. A70 was repainted into Southern Shorthaul Railroad's "tiger" livery during its re-activation in 2024.

== Status table ==
Key:	In Service	Stored	Preserved	Converted	Under Overhaul	Scrapped

Locomotive	Pre-conversion	Named	Entered service	Withdrawn	Scrapped	Livery	Owners	Status	Gauge	Notes
A60	B60	Sir Harold Clapp	7 September 1984	1 August 2015		V/Line Mk2	V/Line (Rebuilt), V/Line Passenger (1995), VicTrack Heritage (2020)	Stored	1,600 mm (5 ft 3 in) broad gauge	Allocated to the Seymour Railway Heritage Centre in 2020.
A62	B62		17 July 1984	1 August 2015		V/Line Orange and Grey	V/Line (Rebuilt), V/Line Passenger (1995), VicTrack Heritage (2020)	Preserved - Operational	1,600 mm (5 ft 3 in) broad gauge	Allocated to 707 Operations in 2020
A66	B66		22 March 1985			V/Line Orange and Grey	V/Line (Rebuilt), V/Line Passenger (1995)	Operational	1,600 mm (5 ft 3 in) broad gauge	Reactivated. Available for hire by preservation groups
A70	B70	Nico	10 May 1985	1 August 2015		Southern Shorthaul Railroad Tiger	V/Line (Rebuilt), V/Line Passenger (1995), Southern Shorthaul Railroad (2023)	Operational	1,600 mm (5 ft 3 in) broad gauge	
A71	B71	Dick Reynolds	20 March 1984	Unknown	1 June 2019	Freight Australia Green and Yellow with Pacific National logos	V/Line (Rebuilt), V/Line Freight (1995), Pacific National (2004)	Scrapped	1,600 mm (5 ft 3 in) broad gauge	
A73	B73	Bob Skilton	20 March 1984	Unknown	14 January 2019	Freight Australia Green and Yellow with Pacific National logos	V/Line (Rebuilt), V/Line Freight (1995), Pacific National (2004)	Scrapped	1,600 mm (5 ft 3 in) broad gauge	
A77	B77	Ian Stewart	17 May 1984	Unknown	17 January 2019	Freight Australia Green and Yellow with Pacific National logos	V/Line (Rebuilt), V/Line Freight (1995), Pacific National (2004)	Scrapped	1,600 mm (5 ft 3 in) broad gauge	
A78	B78		21 December 1984	Unknown		Freight Australia Green and Yellow with Pacific National logos	V/Line (Rebuilt), V/Line Freight (1995), Pacific National (2004), Seymour Railway Heritage Centre (2024)	Stored - Seymour Rail Heritage Centre	1,600 mm (5 ft 3 in) broad gauge	
A79	B79		22 June 1985	Unknown	17 May 2019	Freight Australia Green and Yellow with Pacific National logos	V/Line (Rebuilt), V/Line Freight (1995), Pacific National (2004)	Scrapped	1,600 mm (5 ft 3 in) broad gauge	
A81	B81		15 August 1985	Unknown	10 January 2019	Freight Australia Green and Yellow with Pacific National logos	V/Line (Rebuilt), V/Line Freight (1995), Pacific National (2004)	Scrapped	1,600 mm (5 ft 3 in) broad gauge	
A85	B85	Haydn Bunton	5 June 1984	Unknown	14 January 2019	Freight Australia Green and Yellow with Pacific National logos	V/Line (Rebuilt), V/Line Freight (1995), Pacific National (2004)	Scrapped	1,600 mm (5 ft 3 in) broad gauge	
