= Victorian Railways B class (diesel) =

Class of Australian locomotives

Victorian Railways B Class
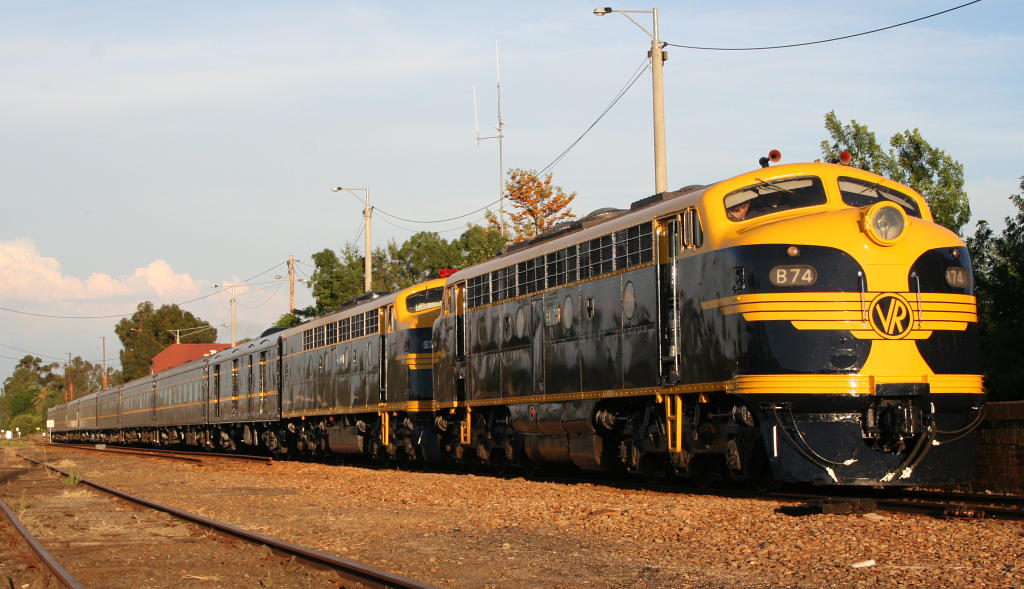
- B74 hauling the 70th anniversary Spirit of Progress in November 2007
Type and origin
- Power type: Diesel-electric
- Builder: Clyde Engineering, Granville
- Model: EMD ML2
- Build date: 1952–1953
- Total produced: 26
- Rebuilder: Clyde Engineering, Rosewater
- Rebuild date: 1984–1985
- Number rebuilt: 11
Specifications
- Configuration
  - AAR: C-C
  - UIC: Co-Co
- Gauge: 1,435 mm (4 ft 8 1/2 in) standard gauge, 1,600 mm (5 ft 3 in)
- Trucks: Blomberg M
- Length: 18.70 m (61 ft 4 in)
- Loco weight: 114 t (112 long tons; 126 short tons)
- Fuel type: Diesel
- Prime mover: EMD 16-567BC (B75: 16-645E)
- RPM range: 950 rpm (max)
- Engine type: V16 diesel engine
- Aspiration: Uniflow scavenging via Roots blower
- Displacement: 9,072 in^{3} (148.66 L) total
- Generator: EMD D12
- Traction motors: EMD D27
- Head end power: Not provided
- Cylinders: 16
- Cylinder size: 567 in^{3} (9.29 L) per cylinder (B75: 645 in^{3} (10.57 L))
- Transmission: Diesel-electric
- Loco brake: A7EL – Dynamic Brake
- Train brakes: A7EL
Performance figures
- Maximum speed: 133 km/h (83 mph)
- Power output: 1,120 kW (1,500 hp)
- Tractive effort: Starting: 267 kN (60,000 lbf); Continuous: 178 kN (40,000 lbf) at 18 km/h (11.2 mph)
Career
- Operators: Victorian Railways (V/Line), West Coast Railway, CFCLA, SSR, CRL,
- Number in class: 26
- Numbers: B60–B85
- First run: 14 July 1952
- Preserved: B60 (A60), B62 (A62), B63, B66 (A66), B72, B74, B78 (A78) B83
- Current owner: Southern Shorthaul Railroad; VicTrack Heritage; Steamrail Victoria
- Disposition: 4 in service, 3 stored, 3 preserved, 5 Original B class scrapped (11 Rebuilt into the A class) (6 rebuilt A class scrapped 2019) 4 A class preserved, 1 A Class in service.

The B class are a class of diesel locomotives built by Clyde Engineering, Granville for the Victorian Railways in 1952–1953. Ordered and operated by the Victorian Railways, they initiated the dieselisation of the system and saw use on both passenger and freight services, with many remaining in service today, both in preserved and revenue service. Some were rebuilt as the V/Line A class, while others have been scrapped.

== History ==
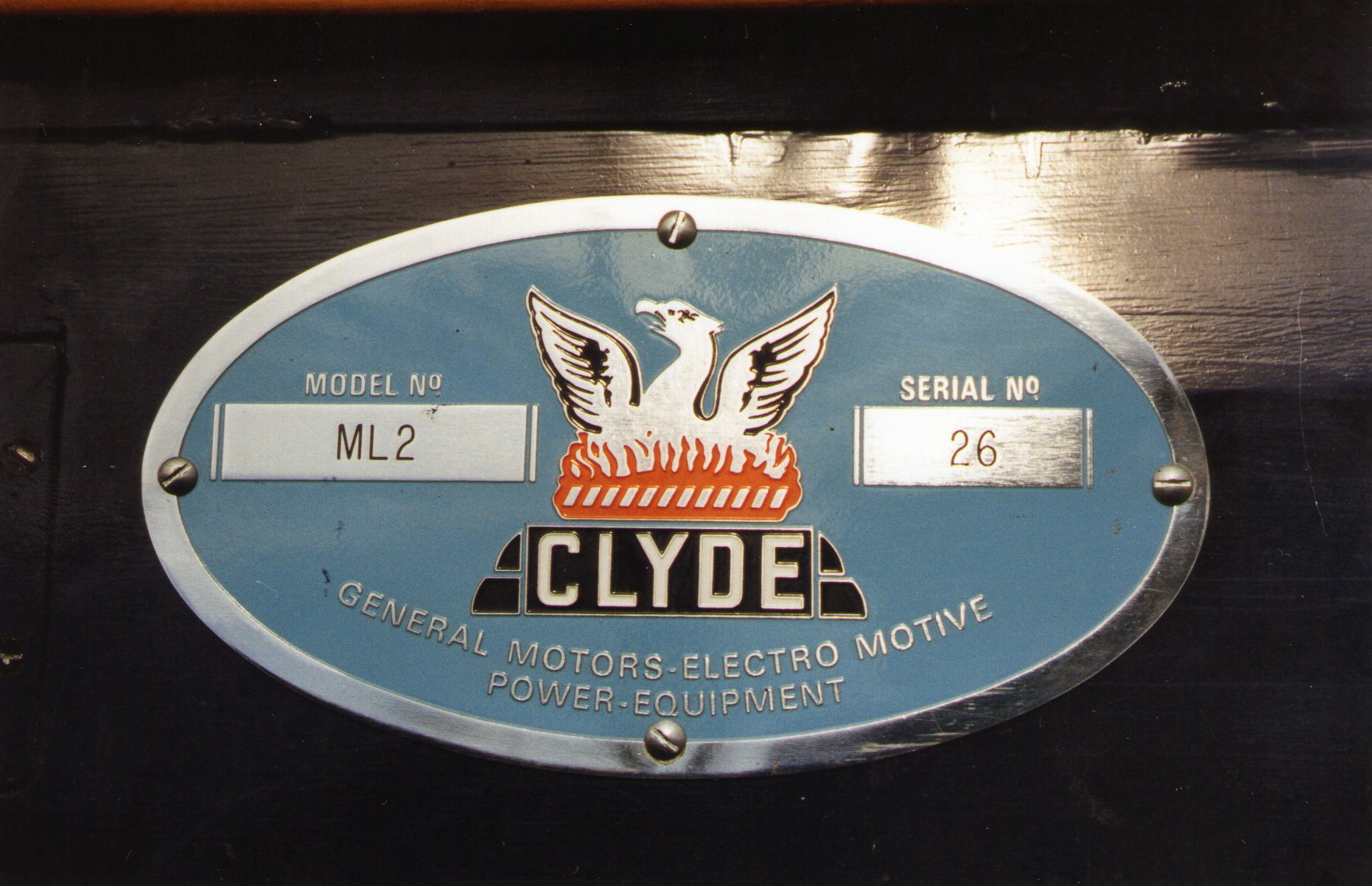
Clyde Engineering reproduction builder's plate on B74's fuel tank valance. Incorrect numbers due to records error.

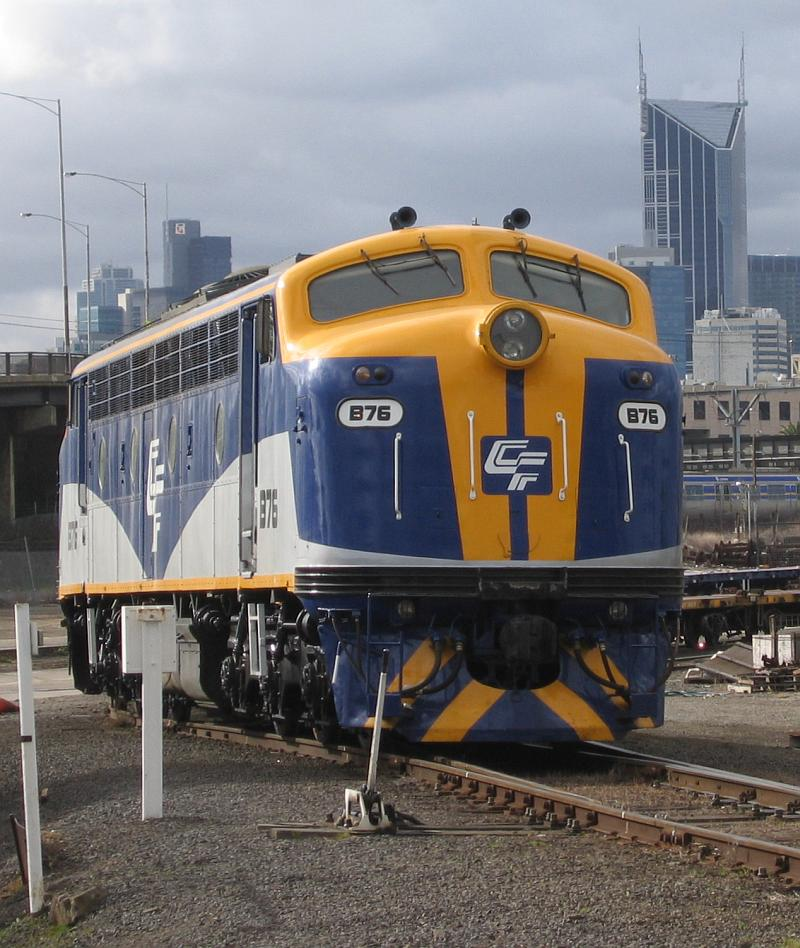
Chicago Freight Car Leasing Australia B76 in Melbourne in August 2006

The B class were the first mainline diesel locomotives ever built for the Victorian Railways. The design was based on the successful Electro-Motive Diesel F-unit locomotives with the distinctive bulldog nose. They were unusual in having a streamlined drivers cab at each end.

== Inception ==
After World War II, the Victorian Railways was severely run down from years of Depression-era under-investment and wartime over-utilisation. Chief Mechanical Engineer Ahlston traveled the world studying railway rehabilitation. Britain leaned towards steam locomotives, while France was moving towards main line electrification. The United States was more divided, with General Motors' Electro-Motive Division at La Grange, Illinois turning out modern E and F-units diesels. However the EMD units axle load was too heavy for the Victorian tracks, and the Commonwealth Government would not allow the use of foreign currency to purchase United States diesels. As a result, the £80 million Operation Phoenix featured steam locomotives and electrification of the Gippsland line, either locally built or imported from the United Kingdom.

To achieve a lighter axle load, a six axles / six motor Co-Co wheel arrangement was required. By 1949, the then-head of Electro-Motive Diesel Dick Dilworth was convinced that lighter axle load locomotives would be popular in Australia and other foreign countries. Frank Shea of Clyde Engineering had also negotiated with EMD to build the new locomotive locally, in order to overcome the foreign exchange restrictions. The order for what would become the B Class was placed in 1951 and the first of the class was delivered on 14 July 1952.

== Into service ==
The 26 members of the class operated on broad gauge lines throughout Victoria, working the majority of the important passenger trains, as well as fast freights. Many timetables were accelerated, and steam locomotives began to be 'euthanized' in large numbers. The visit of Queen Elizabeth in 1954 saw her ride behind B60 on a special train.

While costing £80 per horsepower compared to £60 for steam, the new locomotives ran 130,000 miles per year, compared to 35,000 and 60,000 miles per year for main line steam locomotives. The Chief Engineers Office found that one B class did the work of three steam locomotives. Their success led to further dieselisation, with the delivery of the T class branch line units from 1955, and the single ended S class mainline units from 1957.

== Demise, reactivation and preservation ==
As part of the 1980s New Deal plan to reinvigorate country passenger services, it was decided to rebuild the B class with new traction equipment as the A class. The rebuild contract was let in January 1983 to Clyde Engineering, Rosewater, with the first unit entering service in May 1984. The project was abandoned in mid 1985 after rising costs due to structural fatigue, with the eleventh and final rebuild delivered in August 1985. By 5 October 1986 nine B Class engines - 64, 68, 69, 74 and 80-84 - had been repainted in VicRail's orange livery, but only B68 remained in that state and it was stored out of use. Classmate B69, the second-last, was repainted to V/Line's orange and grey scheme around the same time. B67. B68 and B72 were all stored out of service by mid-February 1987.

At the same time newer high power locomotives had been delivered, including the N class passenger units and the more numerous G class freight locomotives. The remaining B class units were gradually decommissioned by V/Line from 1982 with some scrapped. Six were purchased by West Coast Railway in the early 1990s for use on their Melbourne to Warrnambool passenger service. While running with West Coast Railway, units B61 and B76 had dual marker lights and ditch lights fitted at the No.1 end. They also received shunter's steps at each end, in late 2001 or early 2002. B65 was painted in the simplified West Coast Railway "freight" livery, and did not receive any of these upgrades.

In May 2004, the Victorian Department of Infrastructure issued an alert on stress cracks on the underframes of the B class locomotives, including the units owned by West Coast Railway. Following West Coast Railway's demise in August 2004, these were sold to Chicago Freight Car Leasing Australia and refurbished with B61 and B65 later being resold to Southern Shorthaul Railroad. This saw some converted to standard gauge and their sphere of operation increased to include New South Wales. Seymour Railway Heritage Centre have B74 preserved in operating condition and is the only preserved locomotive in operation.

In 2014, B75 was recommissioned for Southern Shorthaul Railroad, with the unit having been stored at Seymour under multiple previous owners. She wore the CRL colours of red, yellow, silver and black. SSR purchased the remaining CFCLA (now RailFirst Asset Management) units, B76 and B80, in 2022, and returned them to service. As of May 2024, SSR operates B61 and B75 on standard gauge, with B61 under major engine repairs. B76 and B80 are operational in Victoria on the broad gauge, and B65 was scrapped in mid-2025 at North Bendigo workshops after being stored for some years following a major engine failure.

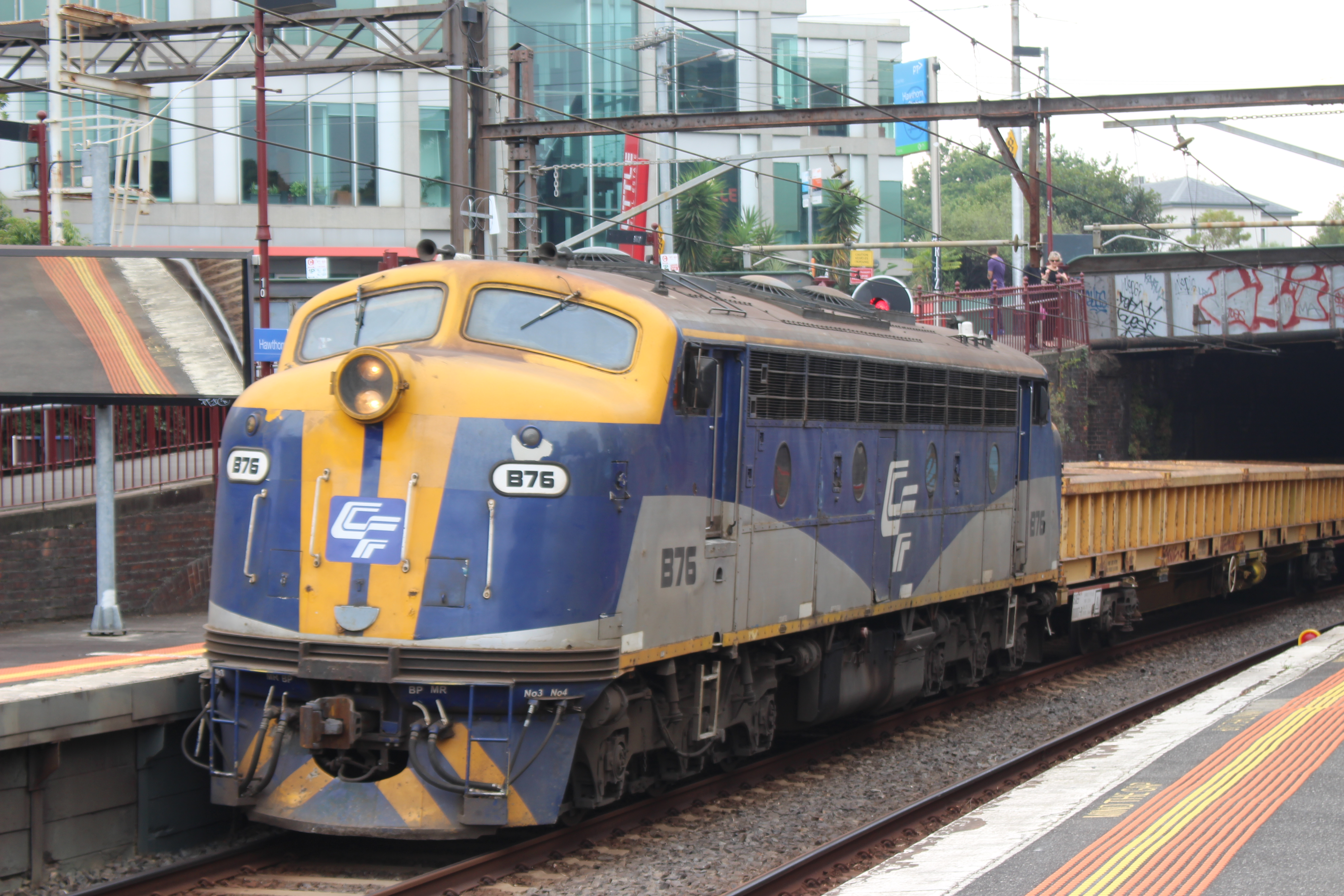
B76 (no.1 end) at Hawthorn heading back to North Dynon on a MTM works train.

In February 2024, B72, which is under the custody of Steamrail, moved under its own power for the first time since its withdrawal in 1986. On 7 March, it was unveiled in full VicRail teacup scheme (its No. 1 end had previously been painted in teacup, with the No. 2 end being painted in V/Line orange, for the 2020 open day).

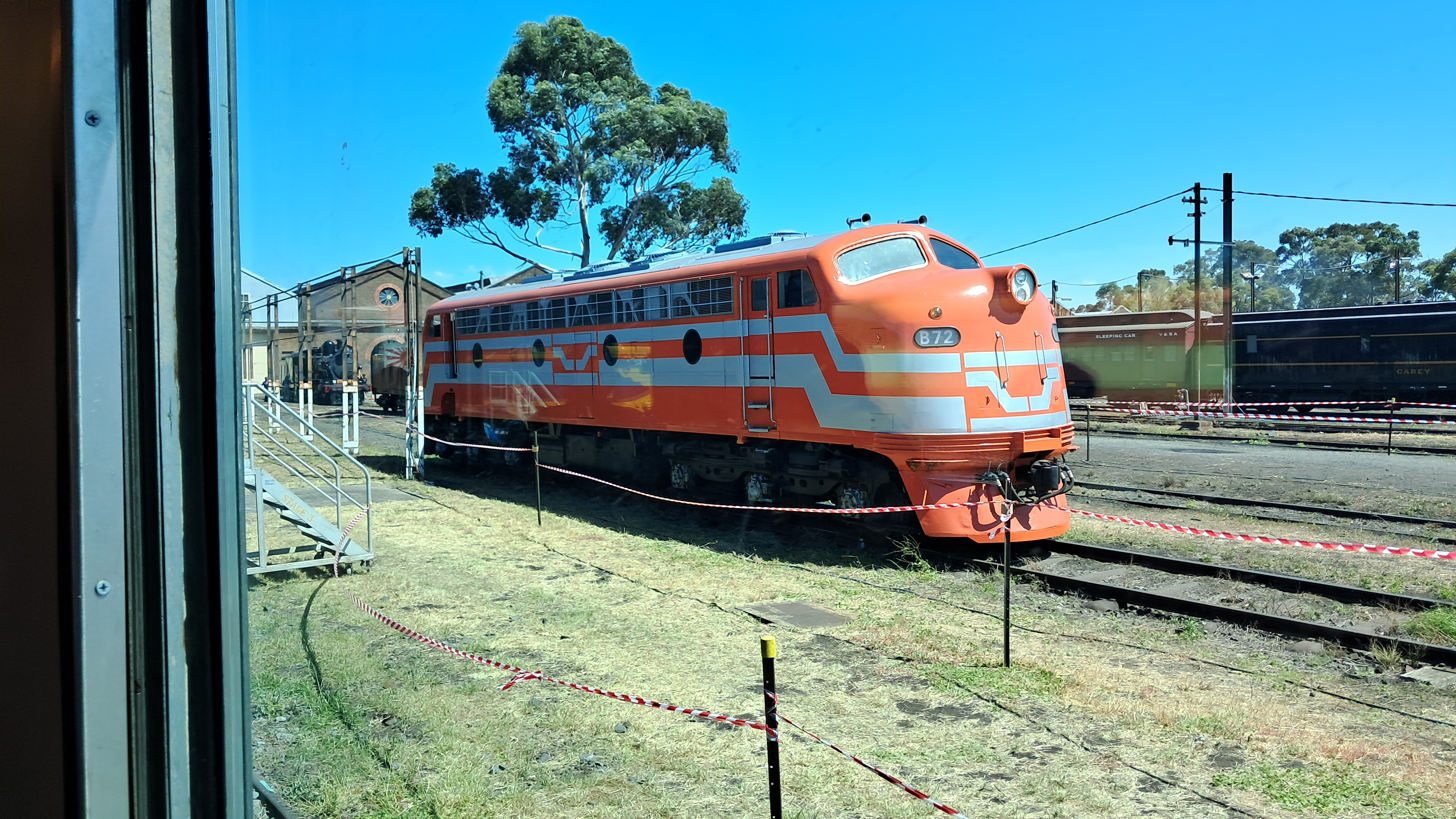
B72 Runs back from a freight demonstration during the biannual Newport Workshops Open weekend. March 9th, 2024

== Fleet summary ==
Key:	In Service	Stored	Preserved	Under Repair	Converted	Scrapped

Number	Name	In service	Out of service	Km	Current owner	Previous owners	Status
B60	Harold W Clapp	14 July 1952	11 February 1983	5,669,690	Converted	Victorian Railways, VicRail, V/Line	Converted to A60, renamed Sir Harold Clapp Preserved SRHC
B61	Bernie Baker	18 August 1952			Southern Shorthaul Railroad (SG)	Victorian Railways, VicRail, V/Line, West Coast Railway	In service. Streamliners 2016 livery.
B62		8 September 1952	28 October 1983	5,541,730	Converted	Victorian Railways, VicRail, V/Line	Converted to A62 Preserved 707 Operations
B63		7 October 1952		5,918,480	VicTrack Heritage, allocated to Steamrail	Victorian Railways, VicRail, V/Line	Stored Newport
B64		27 October 1952		5,989,509	Receivership – Hoskins Hurst	Victorian Railways, VicRail, V/Line	Scrapped Bendigo Workshops 2025, Bendigo
B65		17 November 1952			Southern Shorthaul Railroad	Victorian Railways, VicRail, V/Line, West Coast Railway	Auscision Models livery, Scrapped – North Bendigo 2025
B66		8 December 1952	11 May 1984	5,169,500	Converted	Victorian Railways, VicRail, V/Line	Converted to A66
B67		22 December 1952	18 October 1984	5,217,740	Scrapped	Victorian Railways, VicRail, V/Line	Scrapped April 1988, one nose preserved privately
B68		2 February 1953	19 November 1985	5,217,740	Scrapped	Victorian Railways, VicRail, V/Line	Scrapped April 1988, one nose preserved Geelong.
B69		22 February 1953	May 1984	5,283,950	Scrapped	Victorian Railways, VicRail, V/Line	Scrapped June 1992
B70		23 March 1953	3 June 1984	4,967,250	Converted	Victorian Railways, VicRail, V/Line, Southern Shorthaul Railroad	Converted to A70
B71		13 April 1953	July 1984	4,754,520	Converted	Victorian Railways, VicRail, V/Line	Converted to A71 (Scrapped 1 June 2019)
B72		14 May 1953	1 February 1986	4,754,520	Steamrail Victoria	Victorian Railways, VicRail, V/Line, Private Owner	Under restoration
B73		25 May 1953	17 November 1981	4,575,930	Converted	Victorian Railways, VicRail	Converted to A73 (Scrapped 14 January 2019)
B74	J.A. Hearsch	15 June 1953	May 1988	4,754,520	VicTrack Heritage, allocated to Seymour Railway Heritage Centre	Victorian Railways, VicRail, V/Line	Preserved operational, main line registered, name applied after preservation
B75		6 July 1953	October 1992	4,754,520	Southern Shorthaul Railroad (from 2011)	Victorian Railways, VicRail, V/Line, West Coast Railway (for spares), Great Northern Rail Services (c.2002), privately owned by members of the Yarra Valley Railway	In service
B76		27 July 1953			Southern Shorthaul Railroad	Victorian Railways, VicRail, V/Line, West Coast Railway, Rail First Asset Management	Stored
B77		17 August 1953	17 September 1982	4,808,610	Converted	Victorian Railways, VicRail, V/Line	Converted to A77 (Scrapped 14 January 2019)
B78		7 September 1953	29 February 1984	4,853,800	Converted	Victorian Railways, VicRail, V/Line	Converted to A78
B79		28 September 1953	18 June 1984	4,992,440	Converted	Victorian Railways, VicRail, V/Line	Converted to A79 (Scrapped 17 May 2019)
B80		9 October 1953		4,754,520	Southern Shorthaul Railroad	Victorian Railways, VicRail, V/Line, West Coast Railway, Rail First Asset Management	In service
B81		9 November 1953	15 August 1984	4,944,760	Converted	Victorian Railways, VicRail, V/Line	Converted to A81 (Scrapped 14 January 2019)
B82		30 November 1953	23 May 1988		Scrapped	Victorian Railways, VicRail, V/Line	Scrapped August 1996
B83		21 December 1953	May 1988		VicTrack Heritage, allocated to the Newport Railway Museum.	Victorian Railways, VicRail, V/Line	Preserved static at Newport Railway Museum
B84		18 January 1954	23 May 1988		Scrapped	Victorian Railways, VicRail, V/Line	Scrapped May 1992
B85		22 February 1954	13 March 1983	4,610,040	Converted	Victorian Railways, VicRail, V/Line	Converted to A85 (Scrapped 14 January 2019)

== Gallery ==
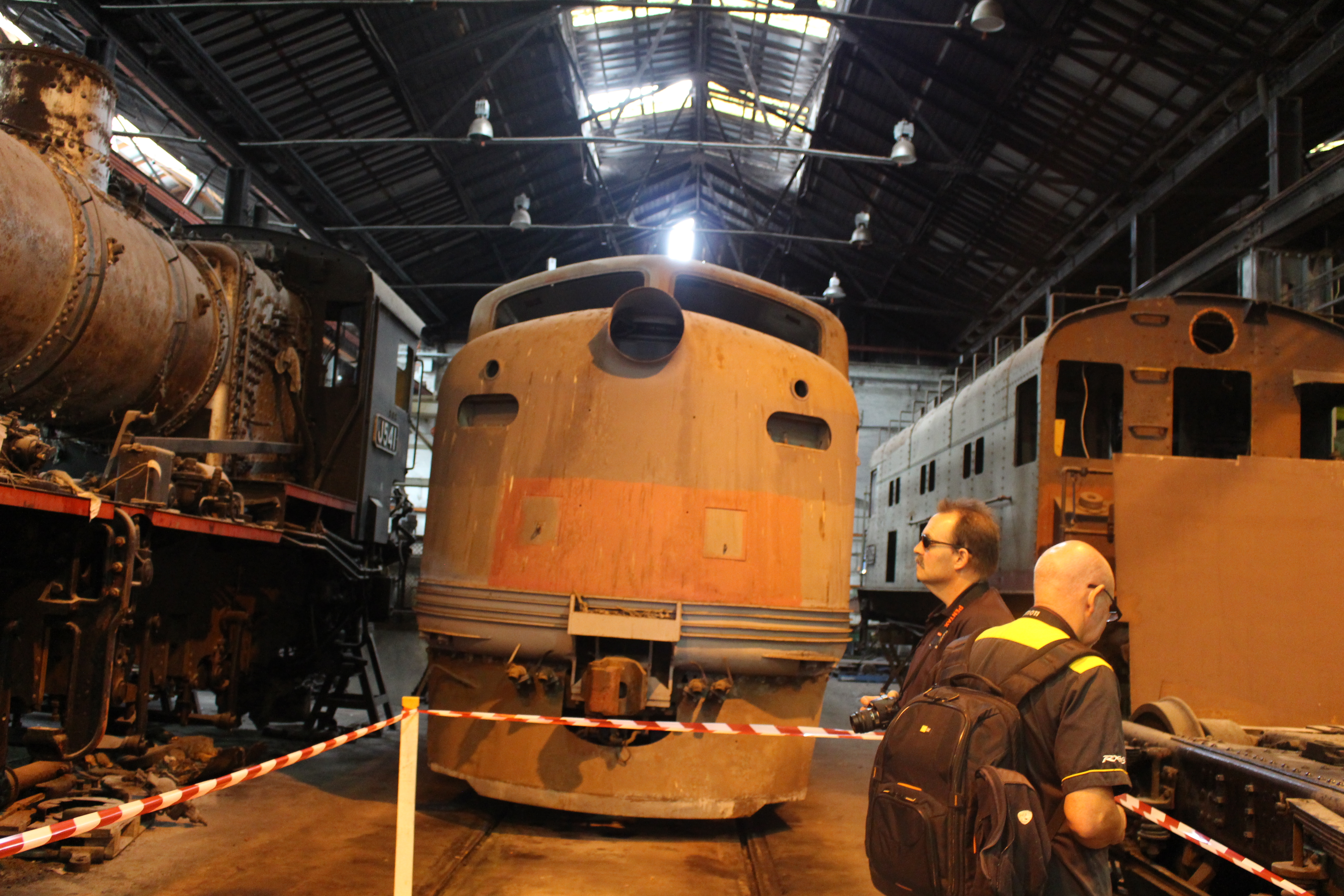
Steamrail Victoria's B72 undergoing long term Restoration at Newport work shops

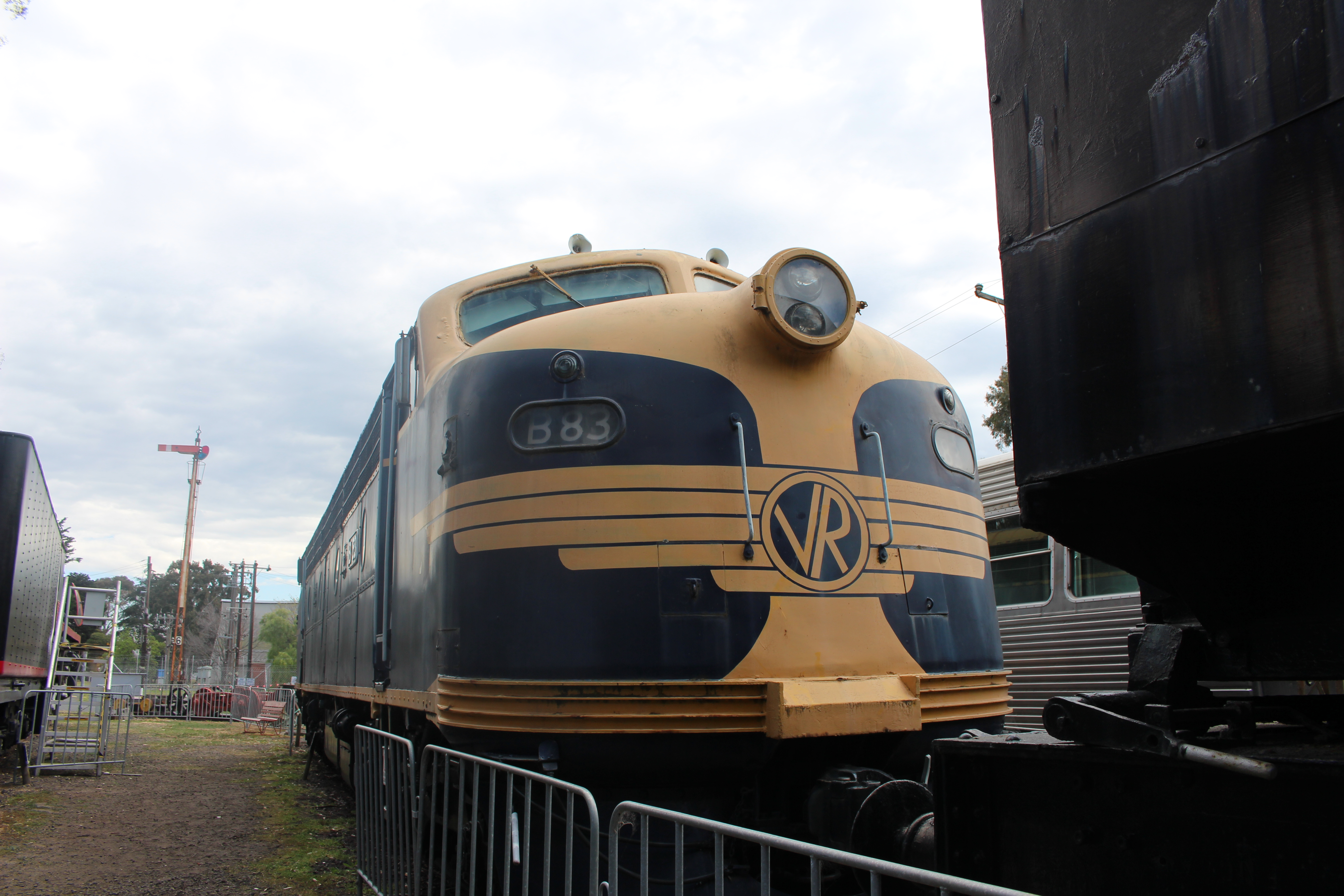
Australian Railway Historical Society Museum's B83 cosmetically preserved at the North Williamstown museum

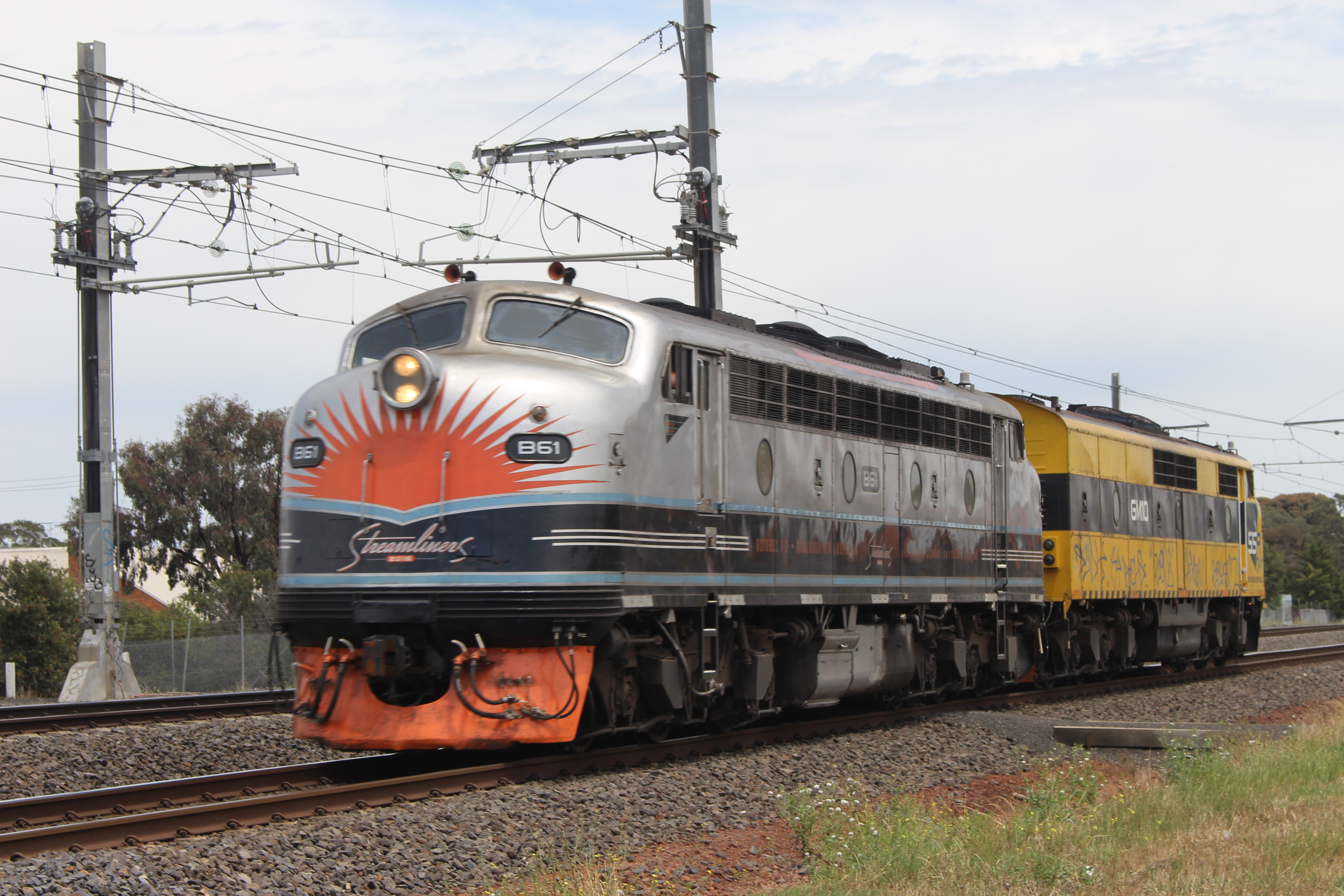
Southern Shorthaul Railroad's B61 in a unique "Streamliners 2016" livery to promote the event in Goulburn

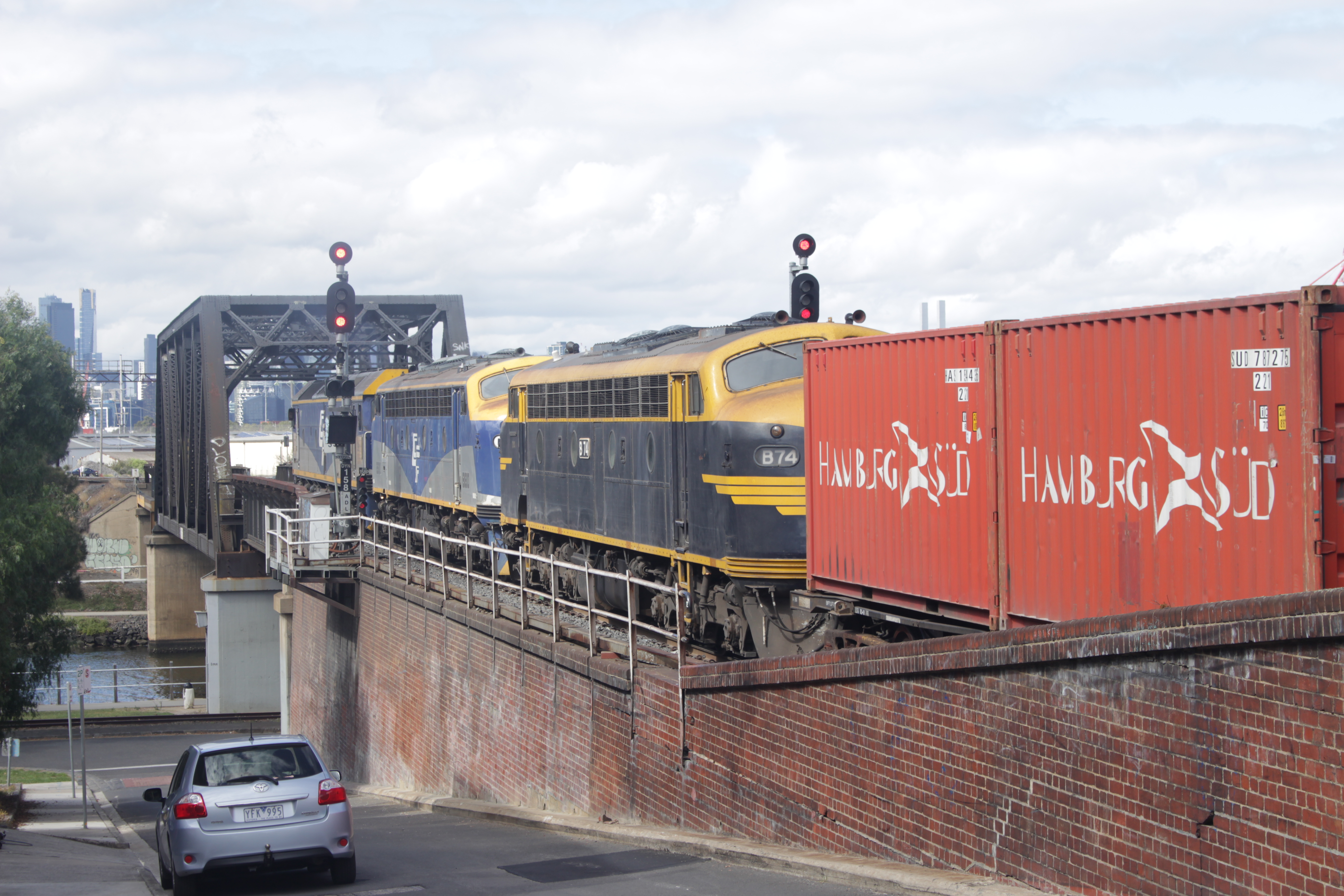
Double B's trailing a G exiting Bunbury Street tunnel

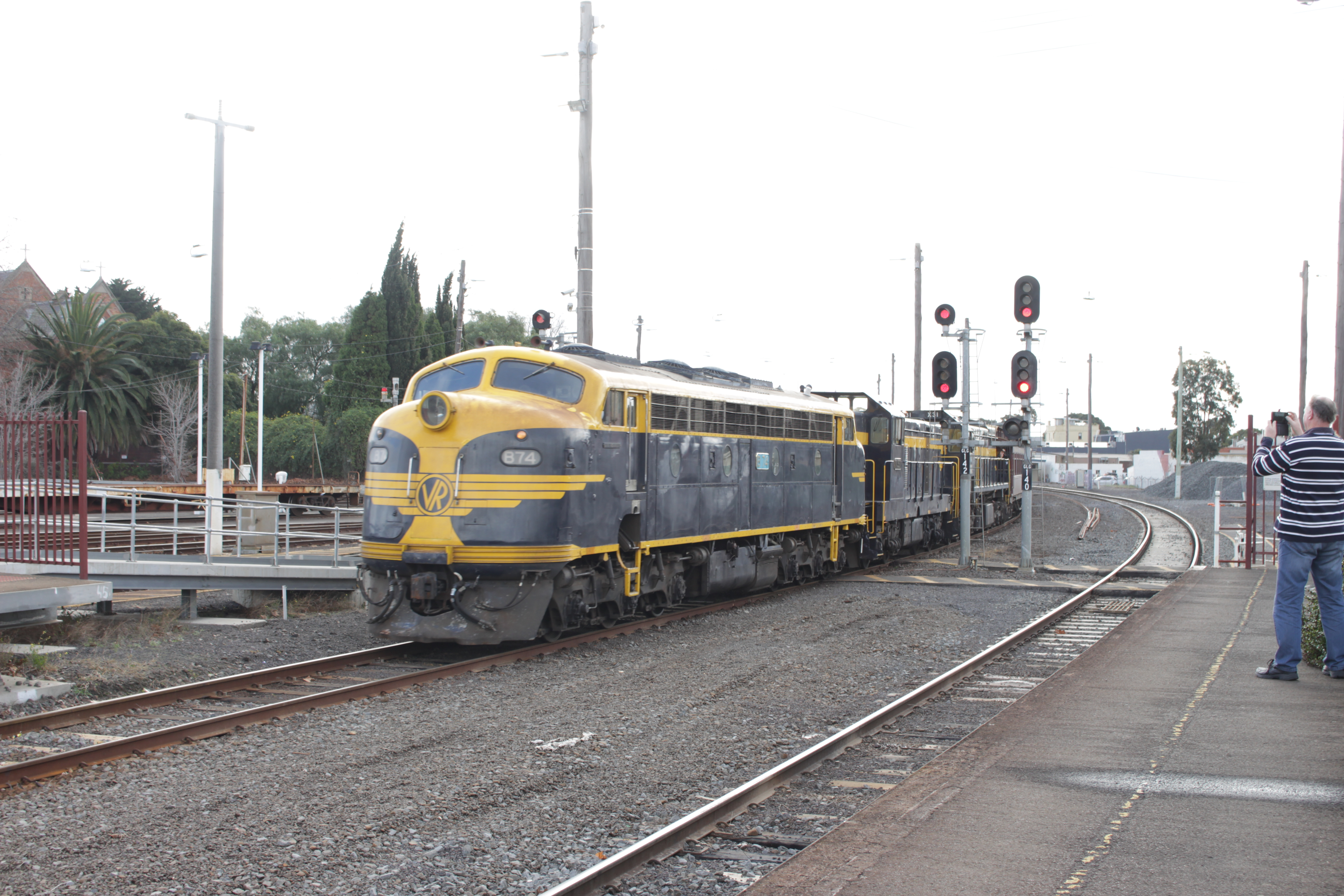
B74 leading T357 and X31 on Seymour Railway Heritage Centre's charter to Geelong celebrating B74's 65th anniversary on entering service

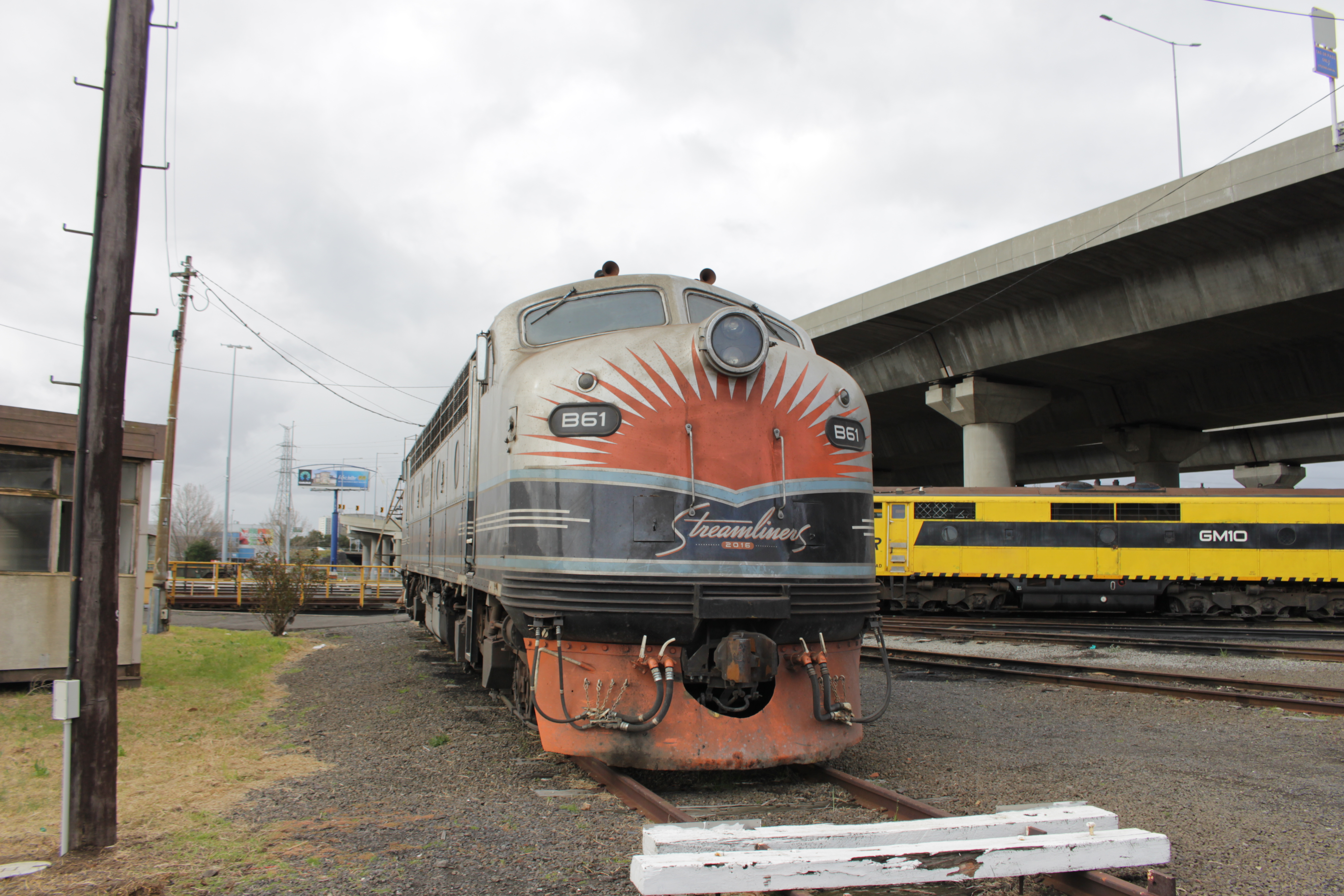
B61 resting at the South Dynon Standard Gauge Turntable

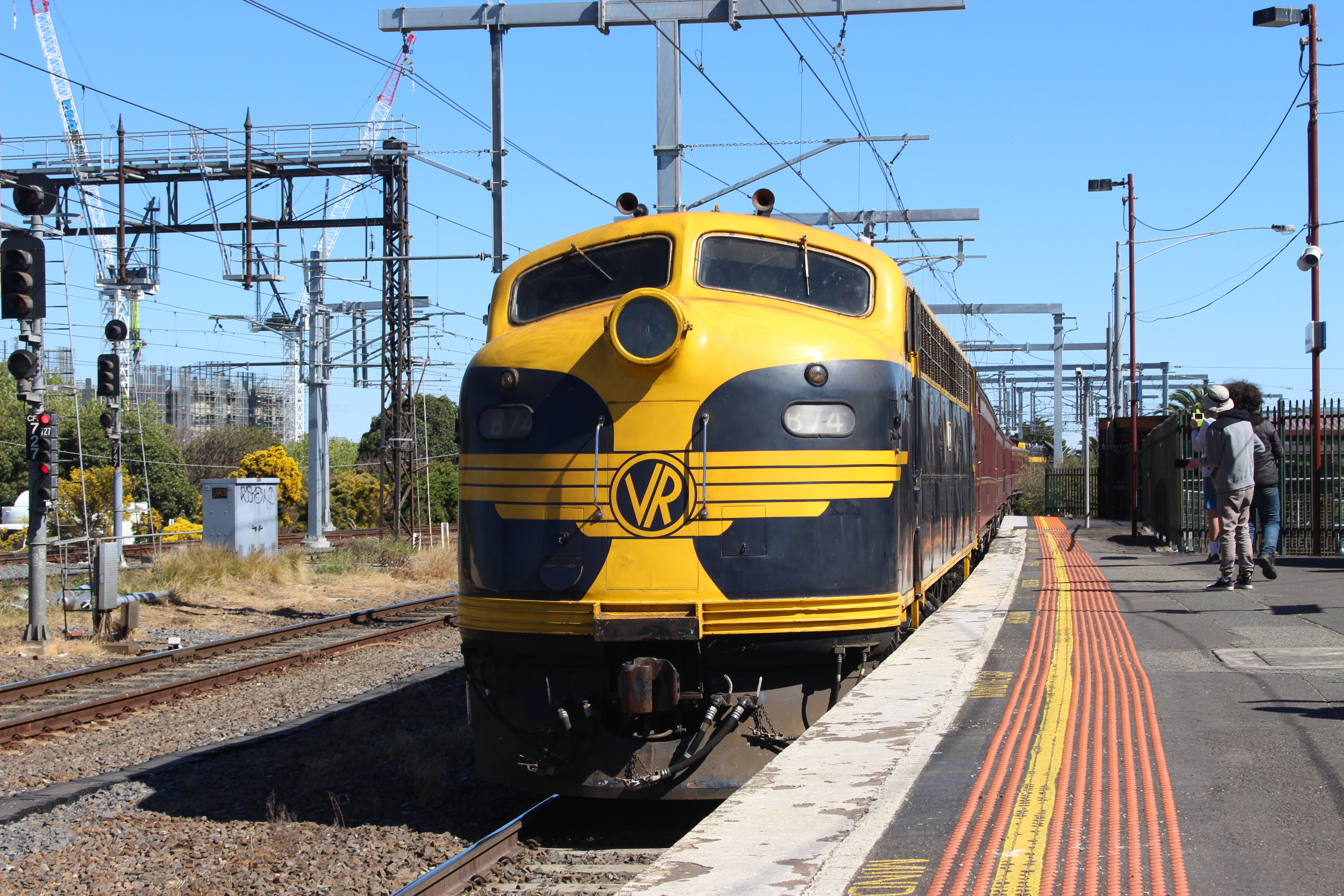
B74 leading X31 on a Level Crossing Removal Authority special shuttle charter between Caulfield and Dandenong stations

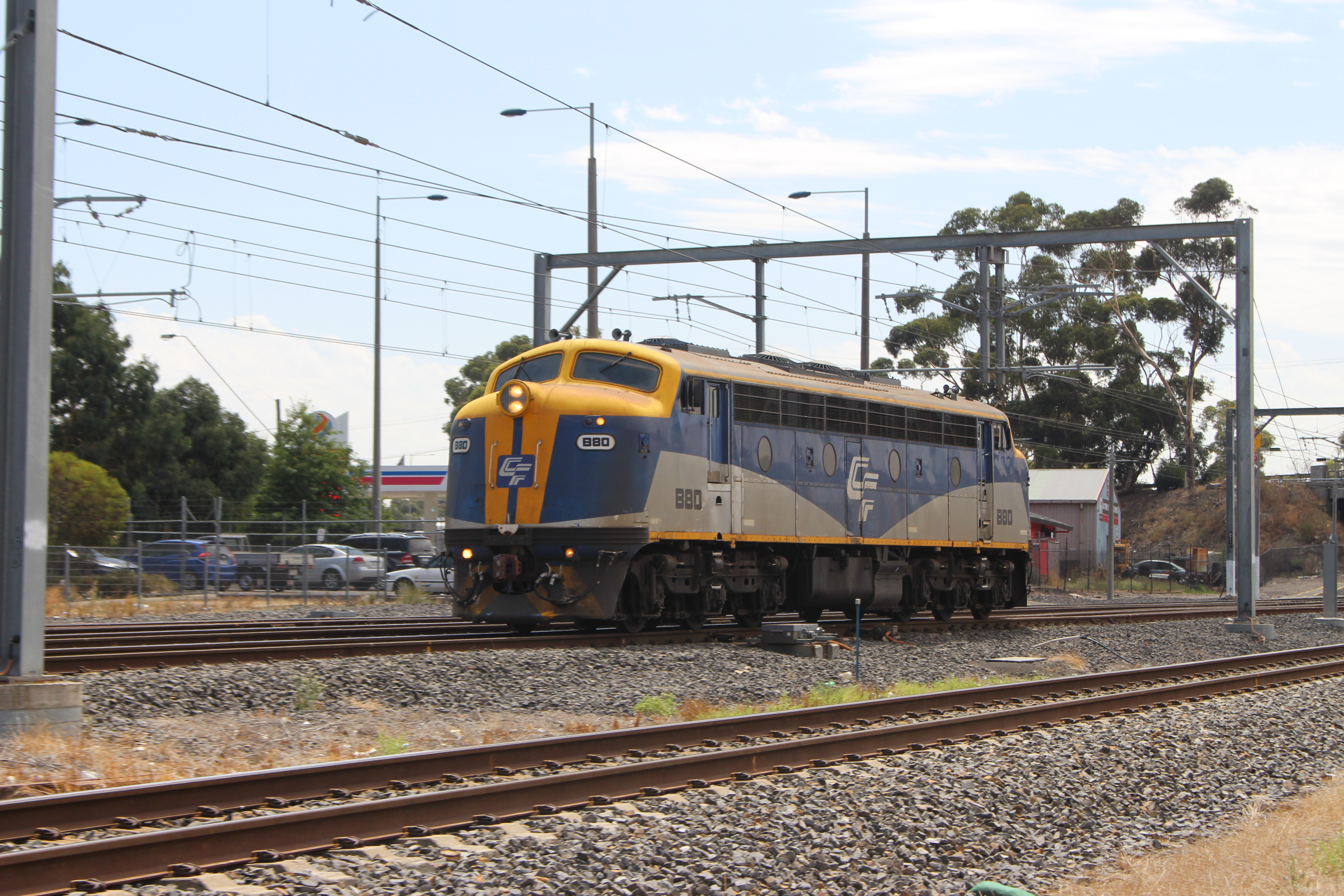
B80 running Light Engine from Seymour to Dynon after dropping off Seymour Railway Heritage Centre's S303

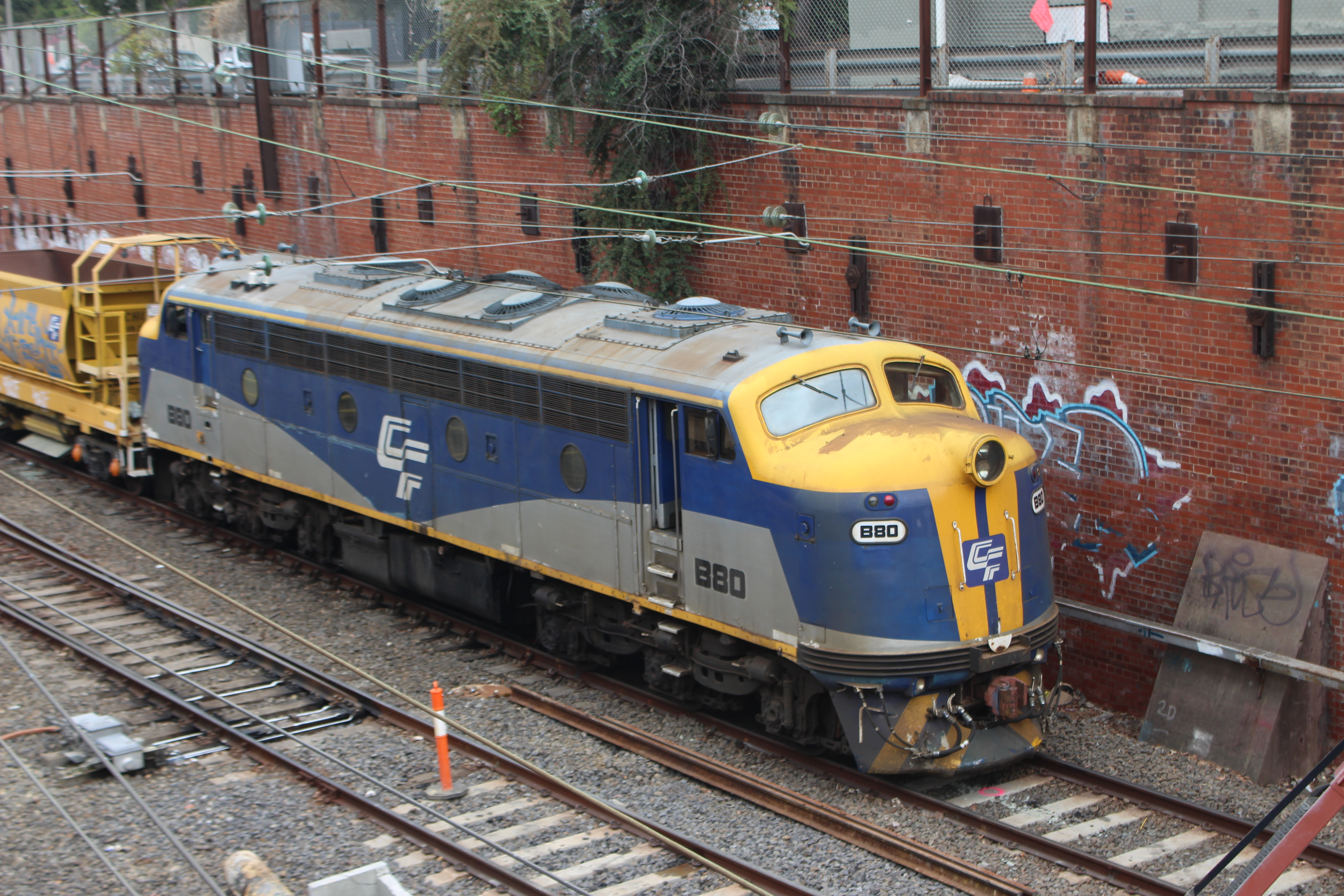
B80 on a works train at Camberwell

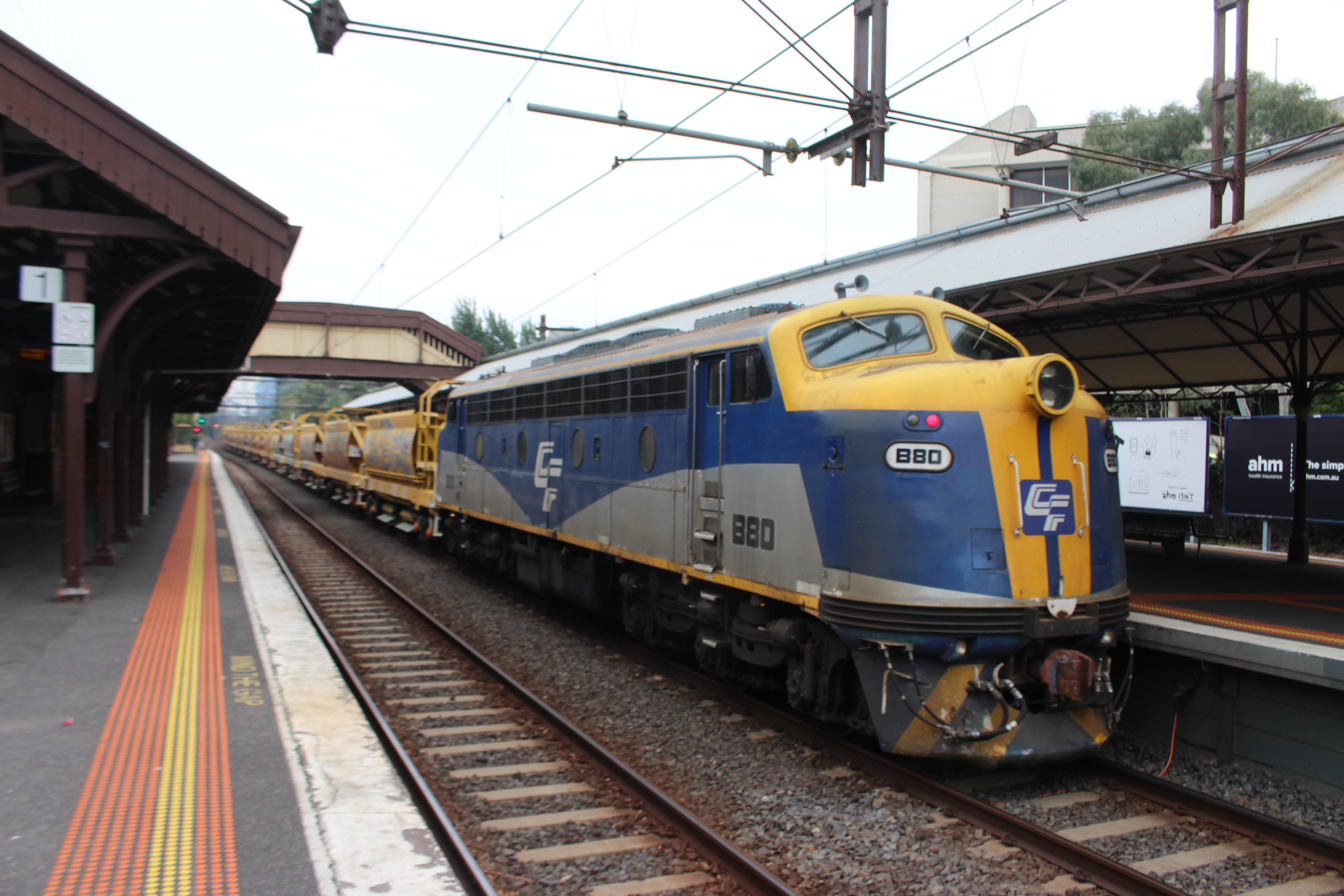
B80 on a works train at Hawthorn

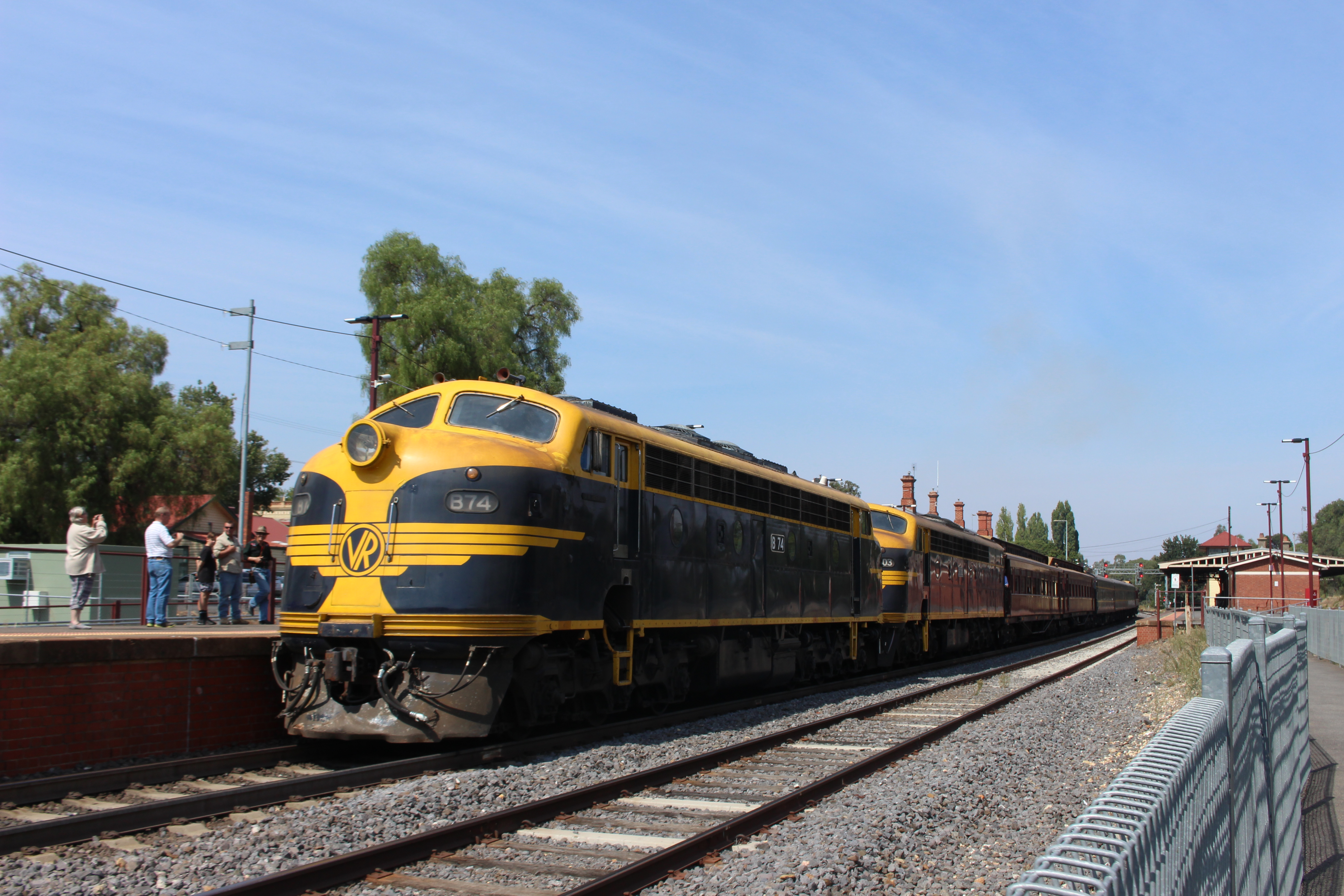
B74 leading S303 on a Royal Train trial at Castlemaine

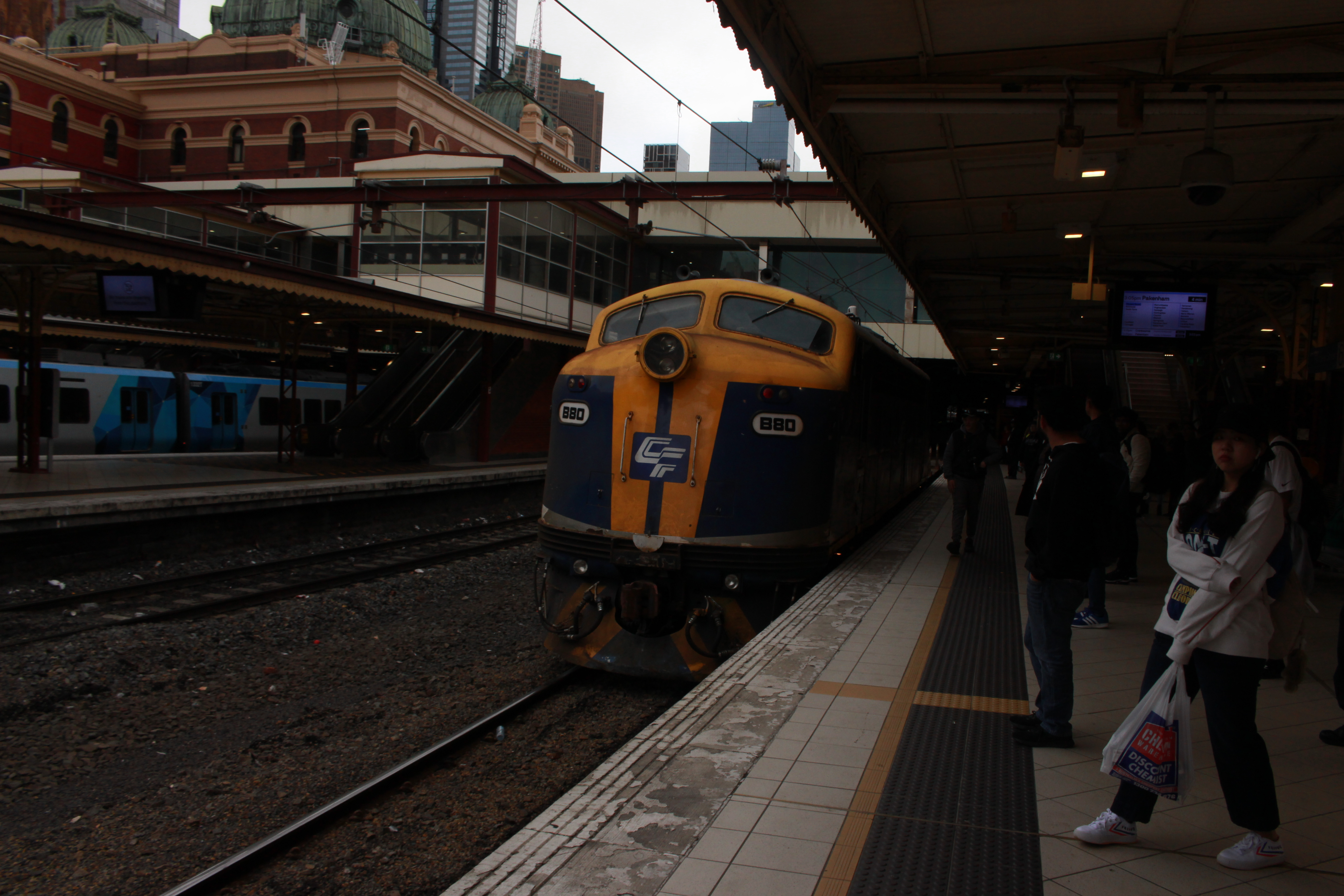
B80 on a works train at Flinders Street

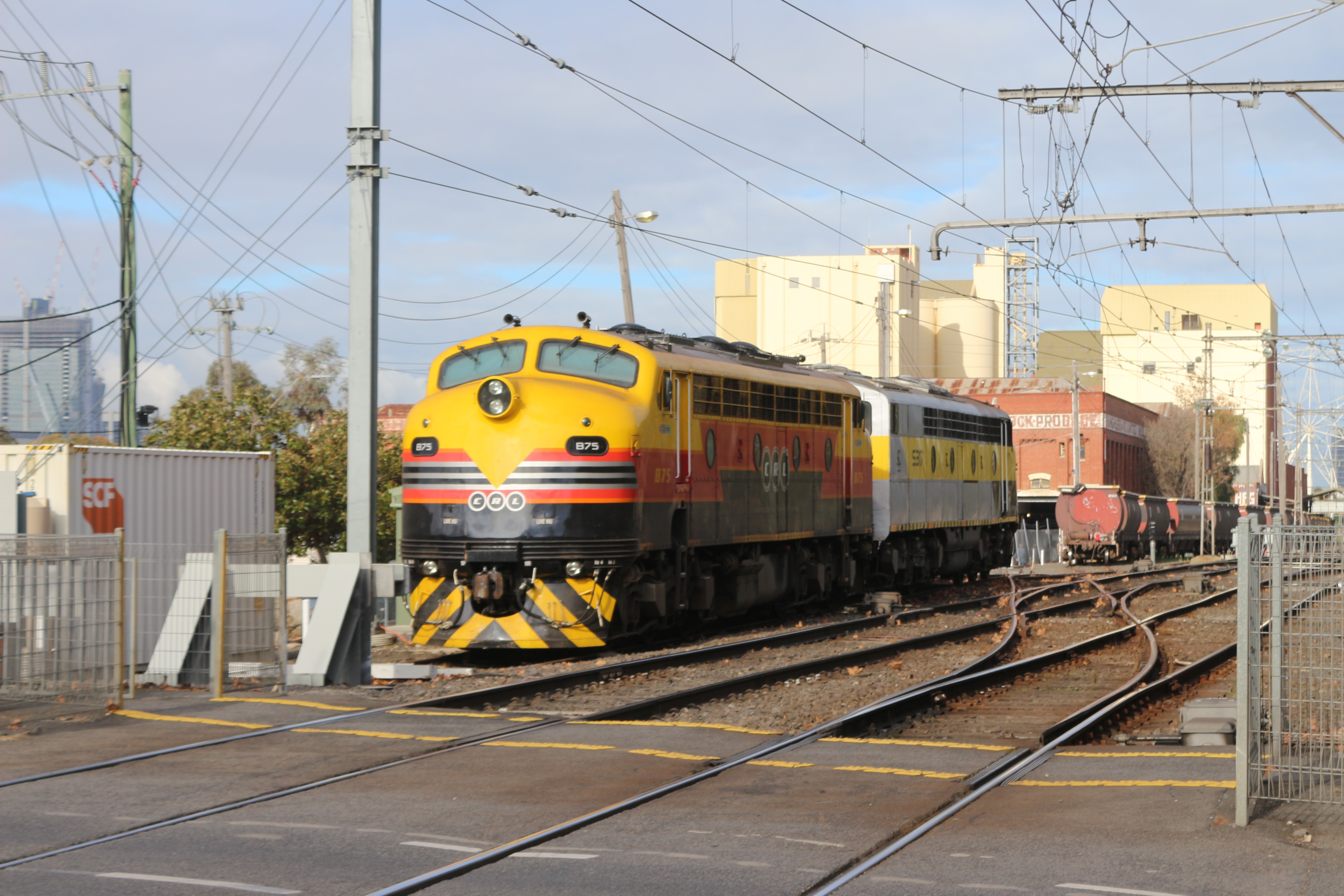
B75 with S317 at the Kensington Mill

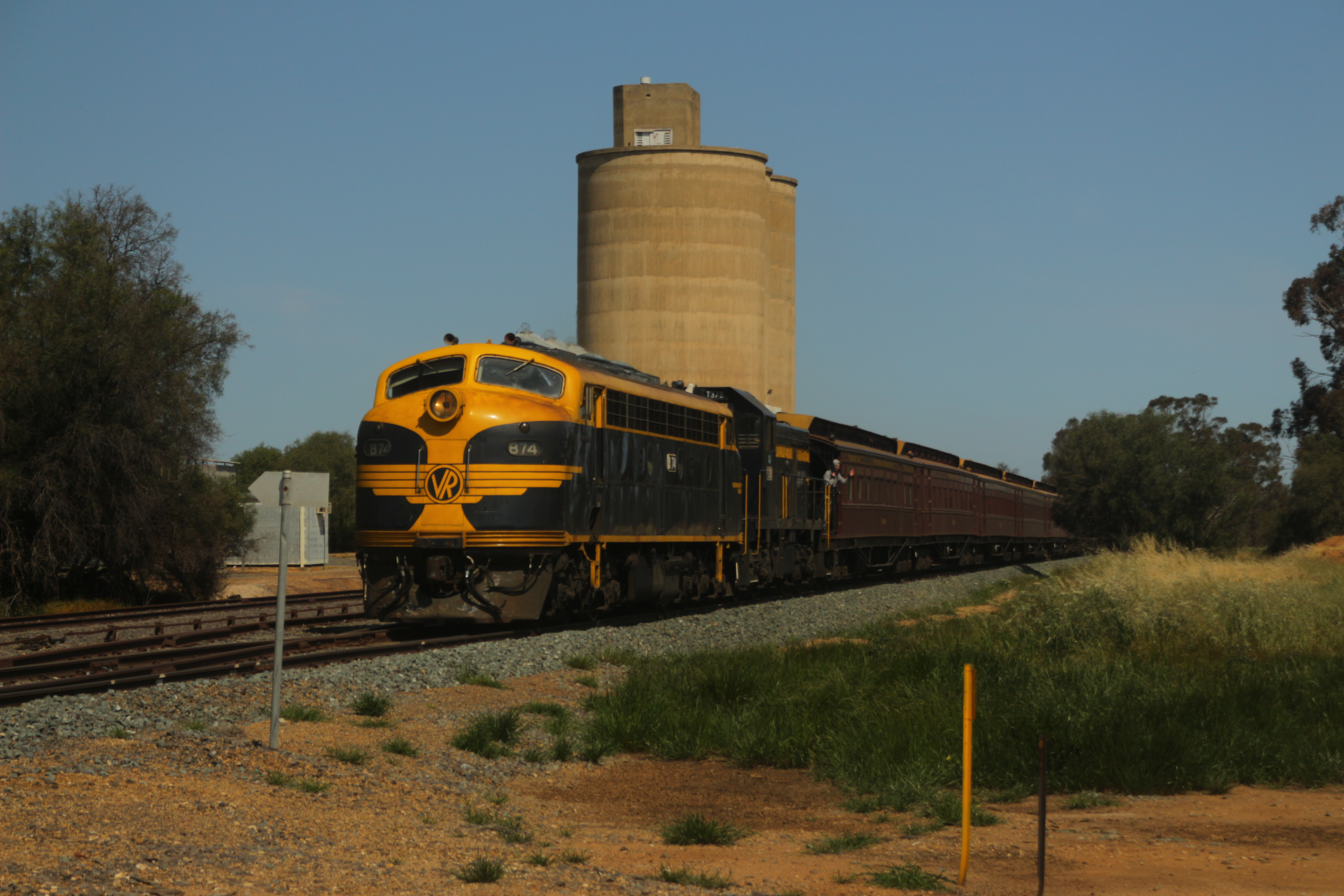
B74 leading T378 on the Seymour Railway Heritage Centre Tocumwal Market Special at Numurkah

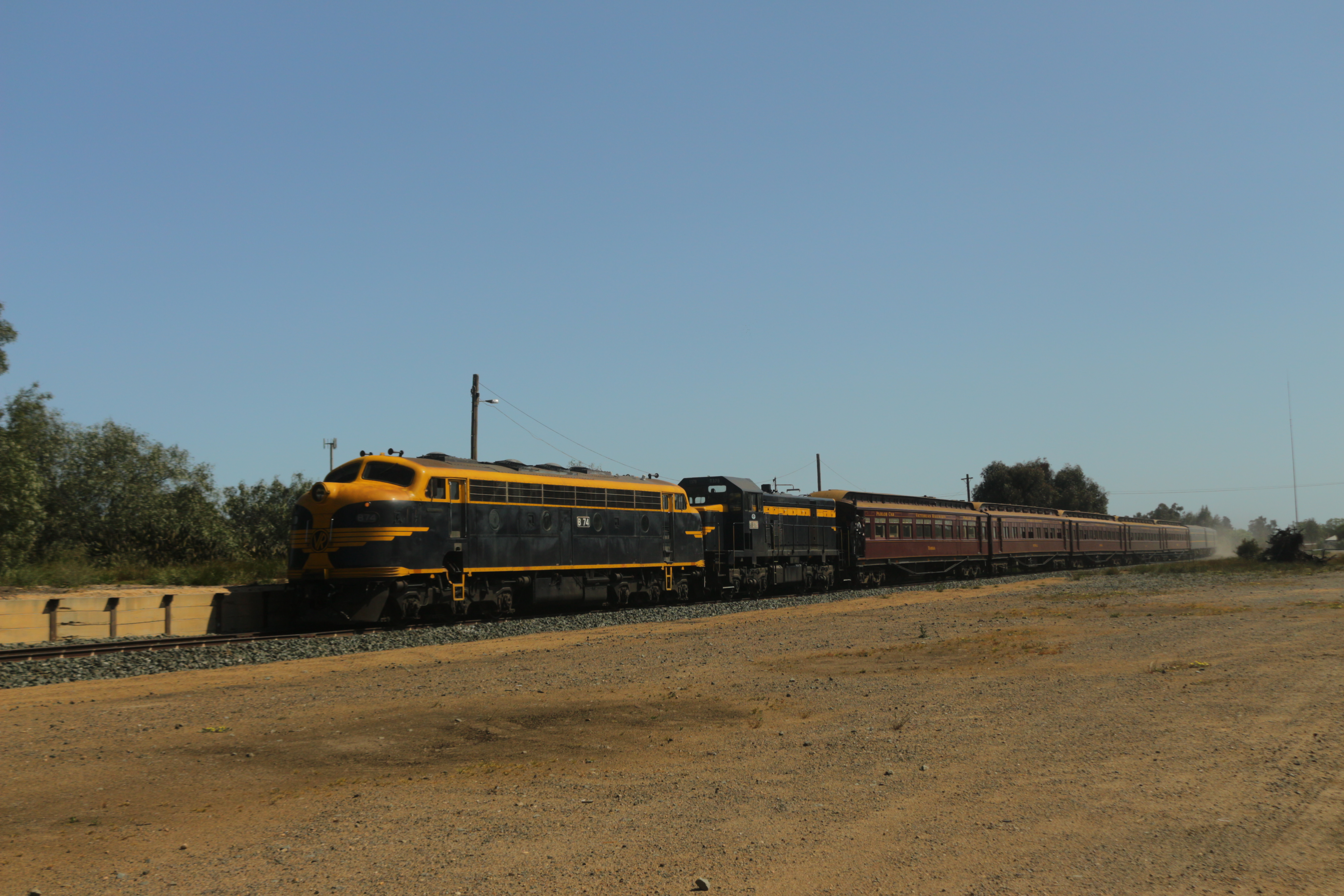
B74 leading T378 on the Seymour Railway Heritage Centre Tocumwal Market Special at Strathmerton

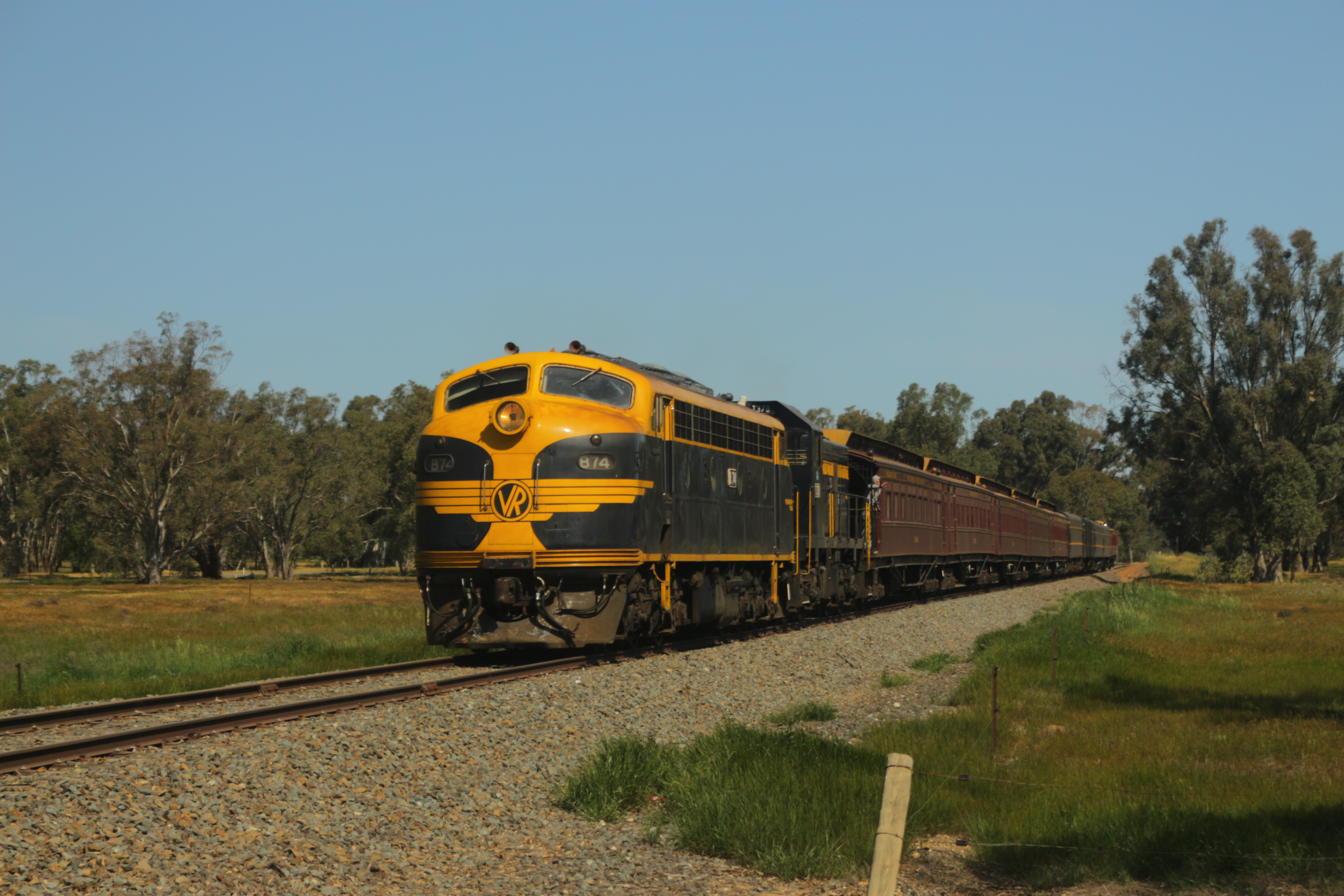
B74 leading T378 on the Seymour Railway Heritage Centre Tocumwal Market Special

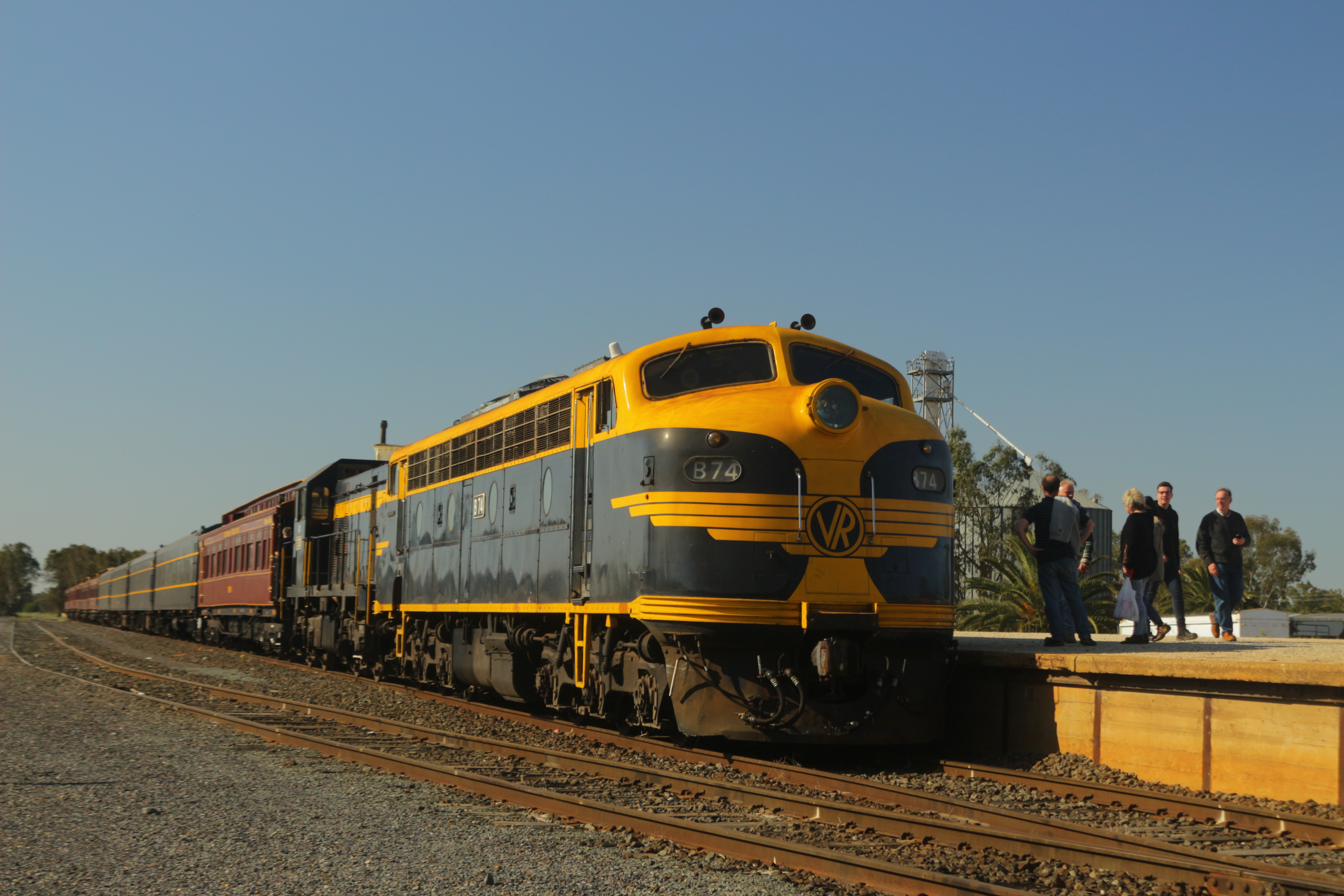
B74 with T378 at Tocumwal after running around from doing the Seymour Railway Heritage Centre Tocumwal Market Tour

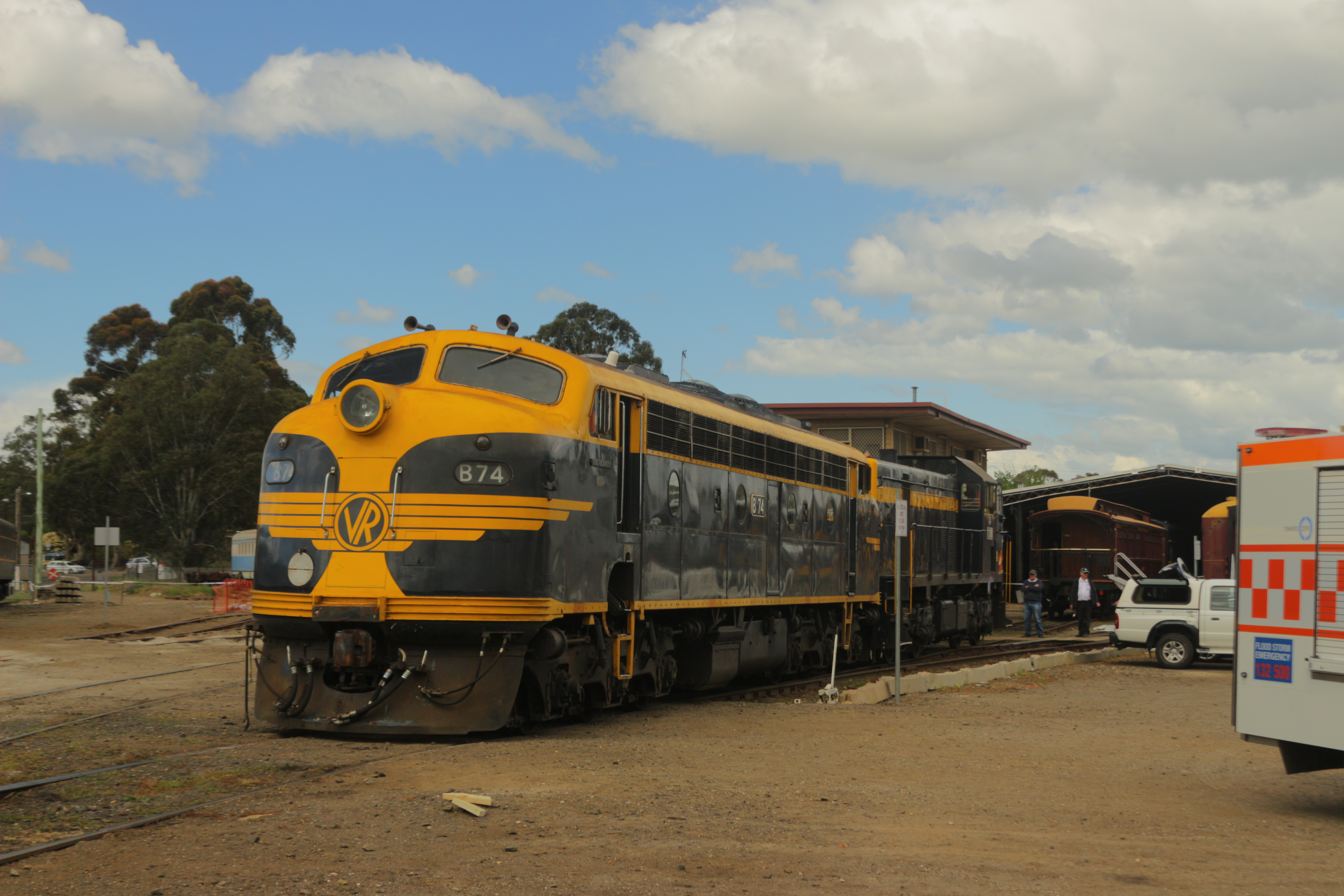
B74 hooked up with T378 at Seymour Railway Heritage Centre

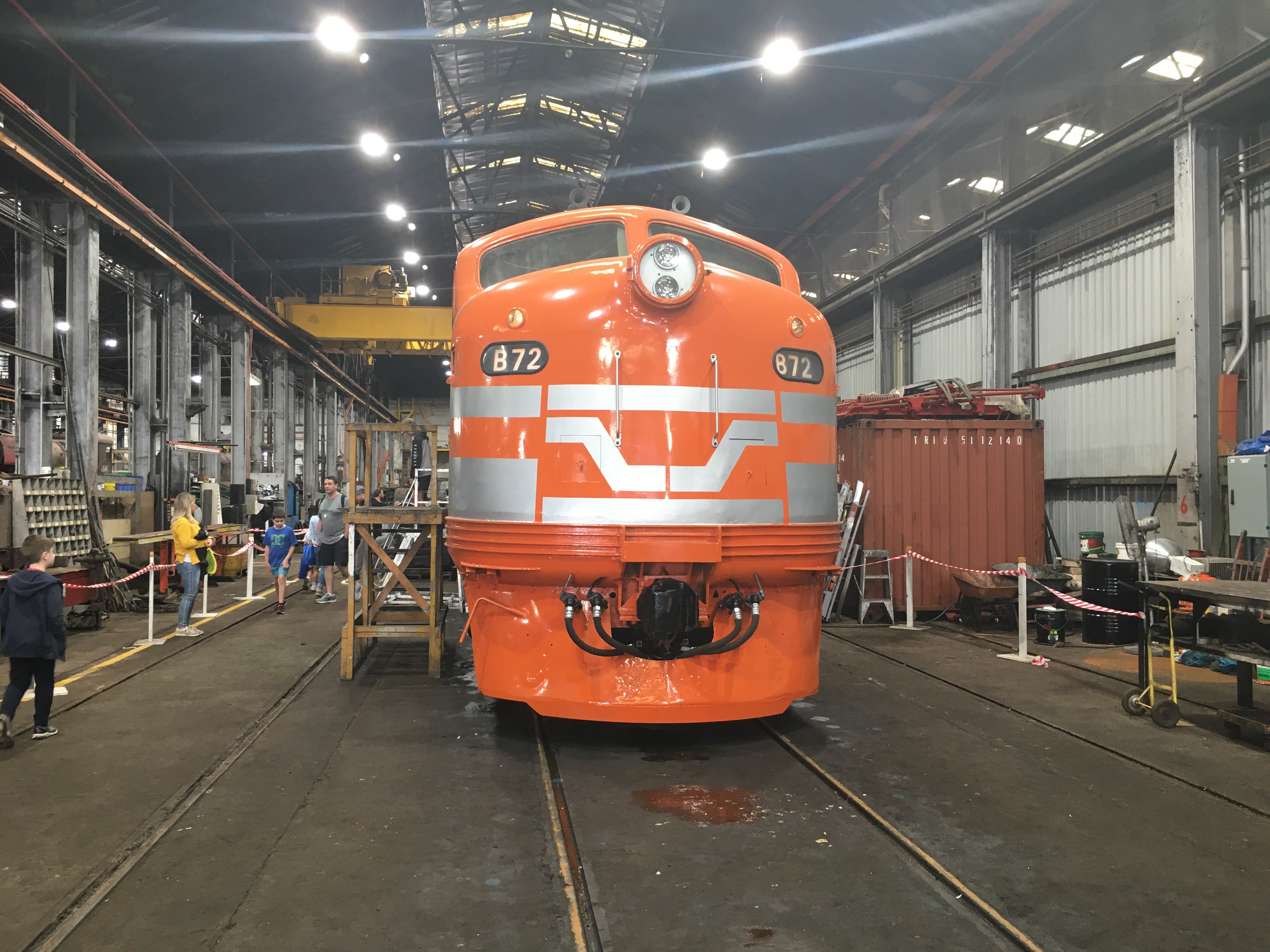
B72 with new paint job in the VicRail teacup livery Steamrail Victoria
