= Western Port Bay Trail =

Shared coastal trail connecting towns in Victoria

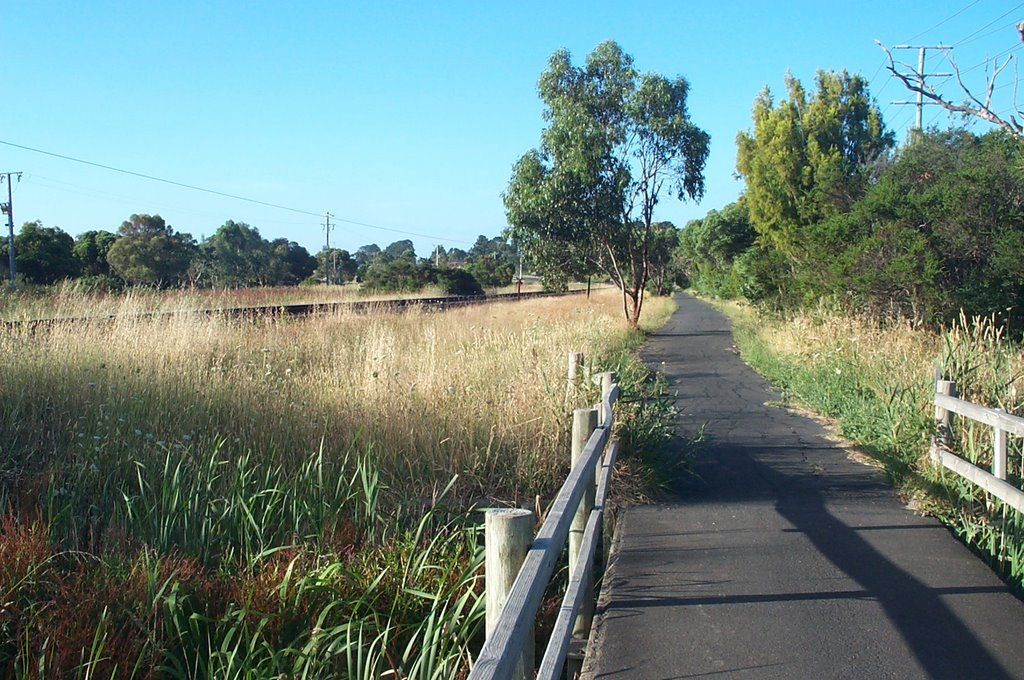
- Part of the Western Port Trail in Tyabb
- Length: Approx. 27 km from Somerville to Balnarring
- Location: Melbourne, Victoria, Australia
- Difficulty: Easy
- Hazards: Trail is overgrown and narrow in some sections; Road crossings
- Surface: Mostly concrete & bitumen; gravel in some sections
- Train: Stony Point line (Somerville to Bittern)

The Western Port Bay Trail is a shared use path for cyclists and pedestrians which follows the coastline of Western Port Bay through several towns on the eastern side of the Mornington Peninsula in Melbourne, Victoria, Australia. The trail begins in Somerville, travelling south through the towns of Tyabb, Hastings, Bittern, Somers and ending in the town of Balnarring. Construction of the trail began in 1994, initially only as a 9 km path connecting the towns of Somerville, Tyabb and Hastings.

== Following the path ==
- From the northern end, the trail begins adjacent to Somerville railway station on the west side of Frankston-Flinders Road in Somerville.
- Travelling south, after crossing Park Lane, the trail makes use of the two-way service road for a short distance.
- The trail continues to travel south, crossing Bungower Road, before reaching the town of Tyabb. Here the Frankston-Flinders service road is used once again for about 300 metres. This is followed by a right turn into Dalton Drive, heading west for 100 metres, then left into Gerald Street, heading due south for 400 metres. The trail then crosses Mornington-Tyabb Road, running parallel to this road on the south side for 100 metres, before heading south through Tyabb Central Recreation Reserve.
- The trail crosses the Long Island branch line off the Stony Point railway line in Hastings, then Frankston-Flinders Road (Graydens Road), meeting with a gravel trail that joins Robertson Street. Turn left into Robertson Street and head east for 100 metres, then turn right on to the trail on the west side of Marine Parade.
- Along Marine Parade, the trail continues to travel south, passing the intersection of the Long Island trail at Barclay Crescent, then crossing Lyall Street and Burke Street. Near the entrance to Hastings Park, the trail crosses Marine Parade, winding its way through Hastings Foreshore Reserve, including a boardwalk section, passing Hastings Jetty and Western Port Marina.
- At the south end of Hastings Foreshore Reserve, the trail heads due west along the south side of Reid Parade for 900 metres, then turns left heading south on the east side of Frankston-Flinders Road.
- In Bittern, the trail crosses Stony Point Road and heads south-west, passing Bittern railway station and crossing Urquhart Crescent.
- After crossing Urquhart Crescent, the trail runs parallel to South Beach Road on its western side.
- At the intersection of South Beach Rd and Disney Street (still in Bittern), the trail crosses South Beach Road and Disney Street, and continues parallel to South Beach Road on its eastern side, now heading south east. Also at the aforementioned intersection a branch of the trail splits off from the main trail and runs parallel to Disney Street. It finishes adjacent to Morradoo railway station in Crib Point.
- In Somers, at the intersection of South Beach Road and Sandy Point Road, the trail crosses both of these roads, heading north-west parallel to Sandy Point Road, on its southern side.
- At the intersection of Lord Somers Road and Sandy Point Road the trail continues west along Sandy Point Road, finishing in Balnarring. Also at the aforementioned intersection a branch of the trail splits off from the main trail and runs parallel to Lord Somers Road. It finishes adjacent to the Coolart Wetlands and Homestead Reserve near Somers beach.
