= Tyabb railway station =

Railway station in Melbourne, Australia

Tyabb
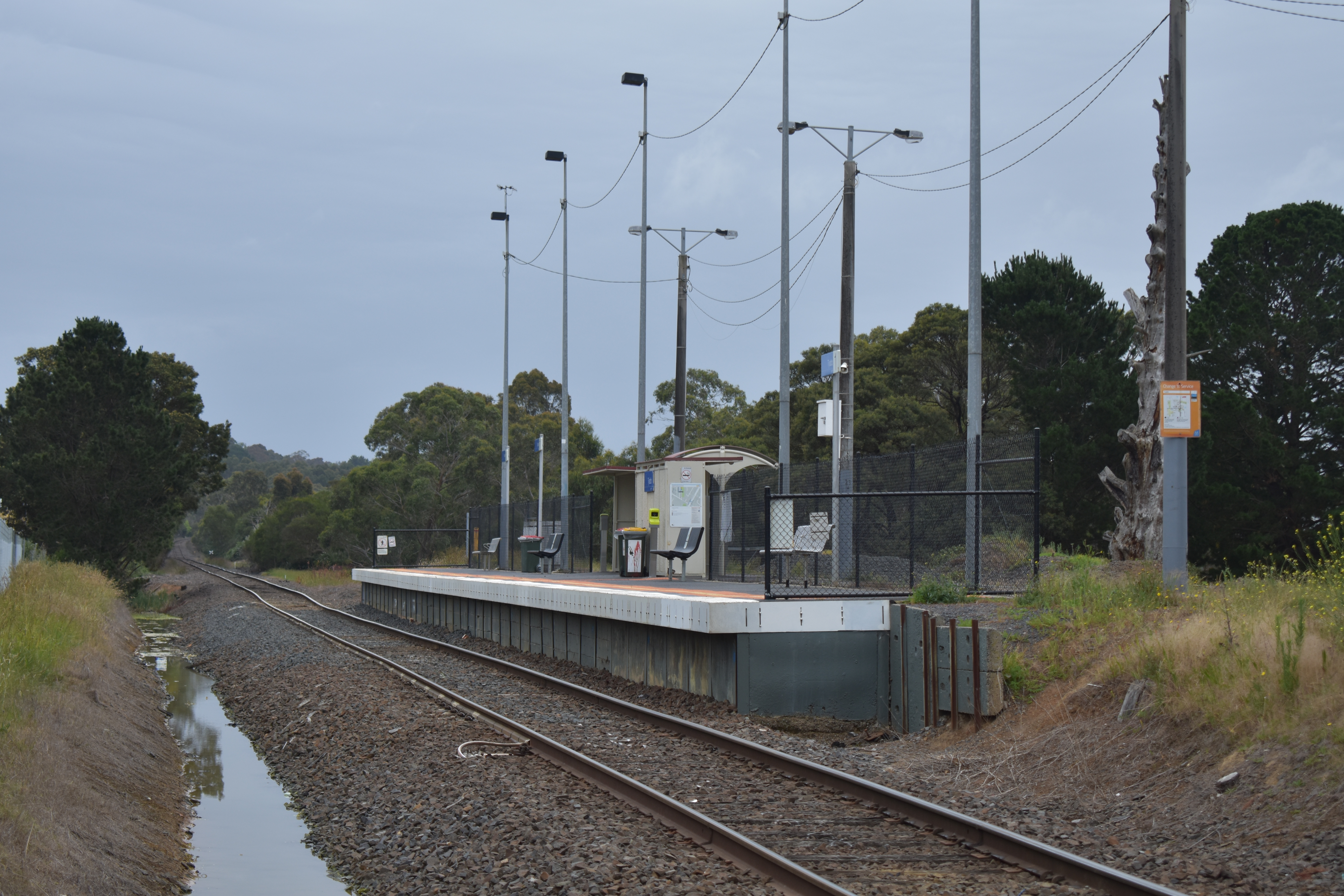
- North-west bound view of the single station platform, December 2025

General information
- Location: Railway Crescent, Tyabb, Victoria 3913; Shire of Mornington Peninsula; Australia
- Coordinates: 38°15′35″S 145°11′10″E
- System: PTV commuter rail station
- Owner: VicTrack
- Operator: Metro Trains
- Line: Stony Point
- Distance: 59.84 kilometres from Southern Cross
- Platforms: 1
- Tracks: 1
- Connections: Bus

Construction
- Structure type: Ground
- Parking: 10
- Accessible: Yes—step free access

Other information
- Status: Operational, unstaffed
- Station code: TAB
- Fare zone: Myki zone 2
- Website: Public Transport Victoria

History
- Opened: 10 September 1889; 136 years ago
- Closed: 22 June 1981
- Rebuilt: 27 September 1984; February 1986

Passengers
- 2015–2016: 7,340
- 2016–2017: 7,003 ▼4.59%
- 2017–2018: 6,319 ▼9.76%
- 2018–2019: 5,612 ▼11.18%
- 2019–2020: 3,700 ▼34.07%
- 2020–2021: 2,700 ▼27.02%
- 2021–2022: 2,350 ▼12.96%
- 2022–2023: 3,400 ▲44.68%

Services
Preceding station	Metro Trains	Following station
Somerville towards Frankston	Stony Point line	Hastings towards Stony Point
Track layout
Location

Tyabb station is a railway station operated by Metro Trains Melbourne on the Stony Point line, part of the Melbourne rail network. It serves the town of Tyabb in Victoria, Australia. Tyabb is a ground level unstaffed station, featuring one side platform. It opened on 10 September 1889, with the current station provided in 1986. It initially closed on 22 June 1981, then reopened on 27 September 1984.

== History ==
Tyabb station opened on 10 September 1889, when the railway line from Baxter was extended to Hastings. Like the town itself, the station has an Aboriginal name meaning 'waterholes' or 'mudhole'.

Signals were once provided at the station, however they were abolished in 1947.

In 1966, flashing light signals were provided at the Mornington–Tyabb Road level crossing, located nearby in the down direction of the station.

On 22 June 1981, the passenger service between Frankston and Stony Point was withdrawn and replaced with a bus service. On 16 September 1984, promotional trips for the reopening of the line began and, on 27 September of that year, the passenger service was reinstated.

Until February 1986, the station consisted of a waiting room, basic toilets and a ticket office. As part of a government rationalisation of public transport, these facilities were no longer deemed necessary, and the buildings were demolished and replaced with the current shelters.

In 2008, boom barriers were provided at the Mornington–Tyabb Road level crossing.

== Platforms and services ==
Tyabb has one platform. It is serviced by Metro Trains' Stony Point line services.

Tyabb platform arrangement
Platform	Line	Destination	Service Type	Source
1	Stony Point line	Frankston, Stony Point	All stations	

== Transport links ==
Ventura Bus Lines operates two routes via Tyabb station, under contract to Public Transport Victoria:

- 782 : Frankston station – Flinders
- 783 : Frankston station – Hastings
