= SVE =

SVE may refer to:

- Scalable Vector Extension, a feature of microprocessor ARM architecture
- Société de Véhicules Electriques, a joint venture for the development of hybrid vehicles
- Soil vapor extraction, an in situ process for soil remediation
- Somerville railway station, Melbourne
- Sharon Van Etten, American singer-songwriter and actress
- Special visceral efferent, nerves that supply muscles
- Specialty Vehicle Engineering, a high-performance automobile group within Chrysler
- Supraventricular ectopy, a type of irregular heartbeat
- Susanville Municipal Airport (IATA airport code), near Susanville, California
