= Western Port Ferries =

- Type: Private company
- Industry: Public transport
- Founded: 2017
- Headquarters: Melbourne, Australia
- Area served: Western Port
- Key people: Matt McDonald (CEO)
- Services: Ferry services
- Parent: Searoad Ferries
- Website: www.westernportferries.com.au

Western Port Ferries is a company providing passenger ferry services in Western Port in Victoria, Australia.

== History ==
Western Port Ferries were awarded the contract to operate ferry routes in Western Port in June 2017 on behalf of the Victorian Government through Public Transport Victoria, replacing the previous operator Inter Island Ferries. The parent company, Searoad Ferries, were existing operators of the private ferry services between Queenscliff on the Bellarine Peninsula and Sorrento on the Mornington Peninsula in Port Phillip Bay.

== Routes ==
The northern terminus of Stony Point connects to the Stony Point railway line which operates services to Frankston railway station.

As of 2017, patronage of the route is approximately 32,000 passengers per year.

=== Timetable ===
There are eight services on weekdays in each direction between Stony Point and Tankerton. On weekends and public holidays, there are seven services.

Between Stony Point and Cowes, there are four services per day on weekdays, weekends and public holidays. During peak holiday season in parts of December and January, an extra fifth service also operates.

Some services also operate between Tankerton and Cowes.

Most ferry services are scheduled to connect to trains arriving or departing from Stony Point railway station.

=== Ticketing ===
Although ferries operate under a contract with Public Transport Victoria, myki tickets are not accepted. A separate fare must be paid when on board the ferry.

Prior to the closure of the Stony Point Kiosk in 2022, tickets could also be purchased on land.

== Fleet ==
The fleet consists of two boats, both introduced in 2017 when the company launched.

Western Port Ferries fleet
Name	Commissioned	Capacity	Service speed
MV Island Explorer	2017	45	12–16 knots
MV Naturaliste	2017	95	12–15 knots

== See also ==
- Port Phillip Ferries
- Westgate Punt
