= Crib Point railway station =

Railway station in Melbourne, Australia

Crib Point
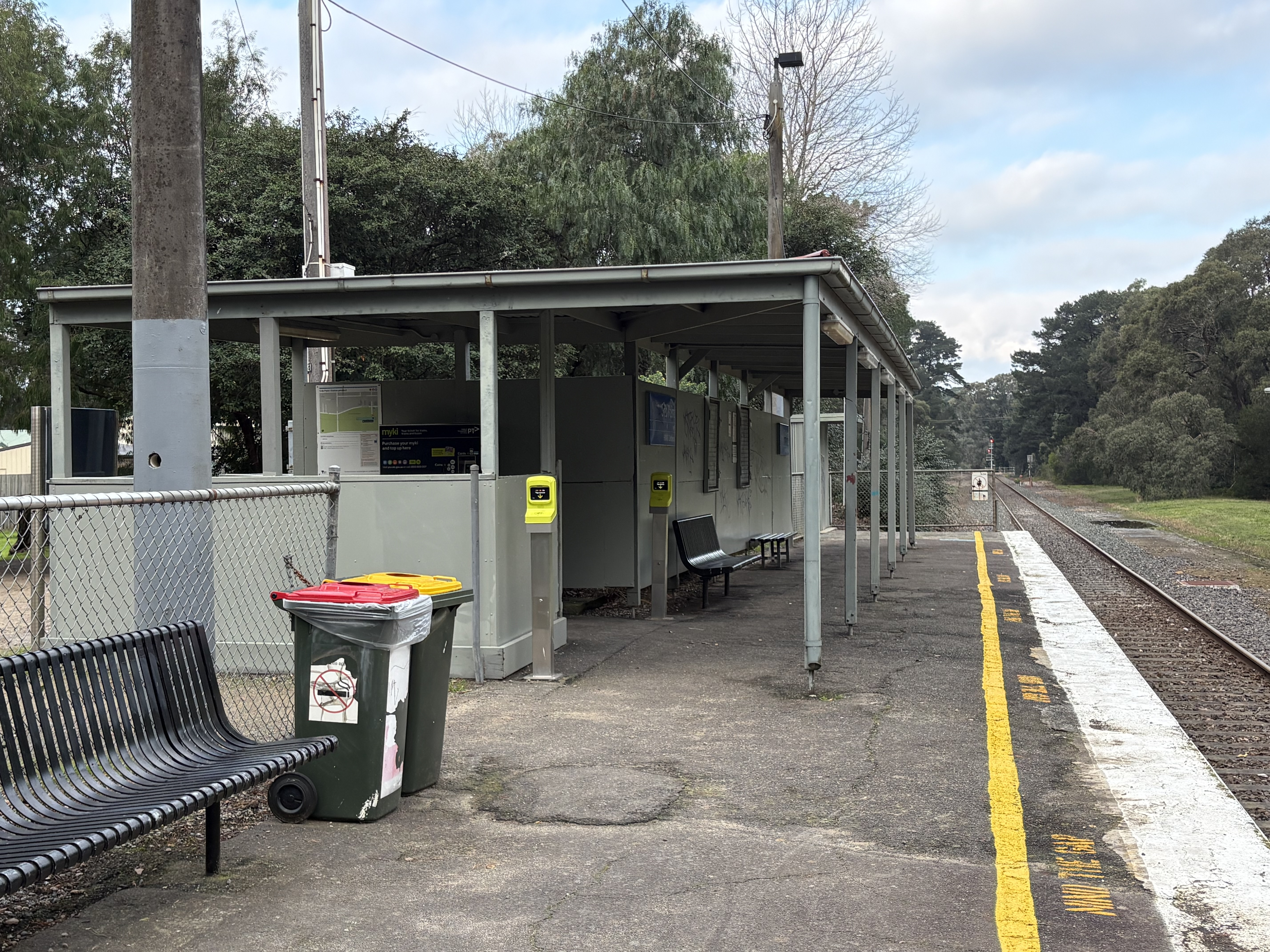
- Southbound view from the single station platform, July 2026

General information
- Location: Stony Point Road, Crib Point, Victoria 3919; Shire of Mornington Peninsula; Australia
- Coordinates: 38°21′58″S 145°12′15″E
- System: PTV commuter rail station
- Owner: VicTrack
- Operator: Metro Trains
- Line: Stony Point
- Distance: 72.83 kilometres from Southern Cross
- Platforms: 1
- Tracks: 1
- Connections: Bus

Construction
- Structure type: Ground
- Parking: 20
- Accessible: Yes—step free access

Other information
- Status: Operational, unstaffed
- Station code: CPT
- Fare zone: Myki zone 2
- Website: Public Transport Victoria

History
- Opened: 17 December 1889; 136 years ago
- Closed: 22 June 1981
- Rebuilt: 27 September 1984; February 1986

Passengers
- 2015–2016: 13,657
- 2016–2017: 13,655 ▼0.01%
- 2017–2018: 12,496 ▼8.48%
- 2018–2019: 17,911 ▲43.33%
- 2019–2020: 10,800 ▼39.7%
- 2020–2021: 8,450 ▼21.75%
- 2021–2022: 6,700 ▼20.71%
- 2022–2023: 9,450 ▲41.04%
- 2023–2024: 7,150 ▼24.34%
- 2023–2024: 7,900 ▲10.49%

Services
Preceding station	Metro Trains	Following station
Morradoo towards Frankston	Stony Point line	Stony Point Terminus
Track layout
Location

Crib Point railway station is a railway station operated by Metro Trains Melbourne on the Stony Point line, part of the Melbourne rail network. It serves the town of Crib Point in Victoria, Australia. Crib Point is a ground level unstaffed station, featuring one side platform. It opened on 17 December 1889, with the current station provided in 1986. It initially closed on 22 June 1981, then reopened on 27 September 1984.

A former freight yard was originally located opposite of the station, while a branch line and triangle into HMAS Cerberus was located at the up end of the station, past the Naval Base Road level crossing.

== History ==
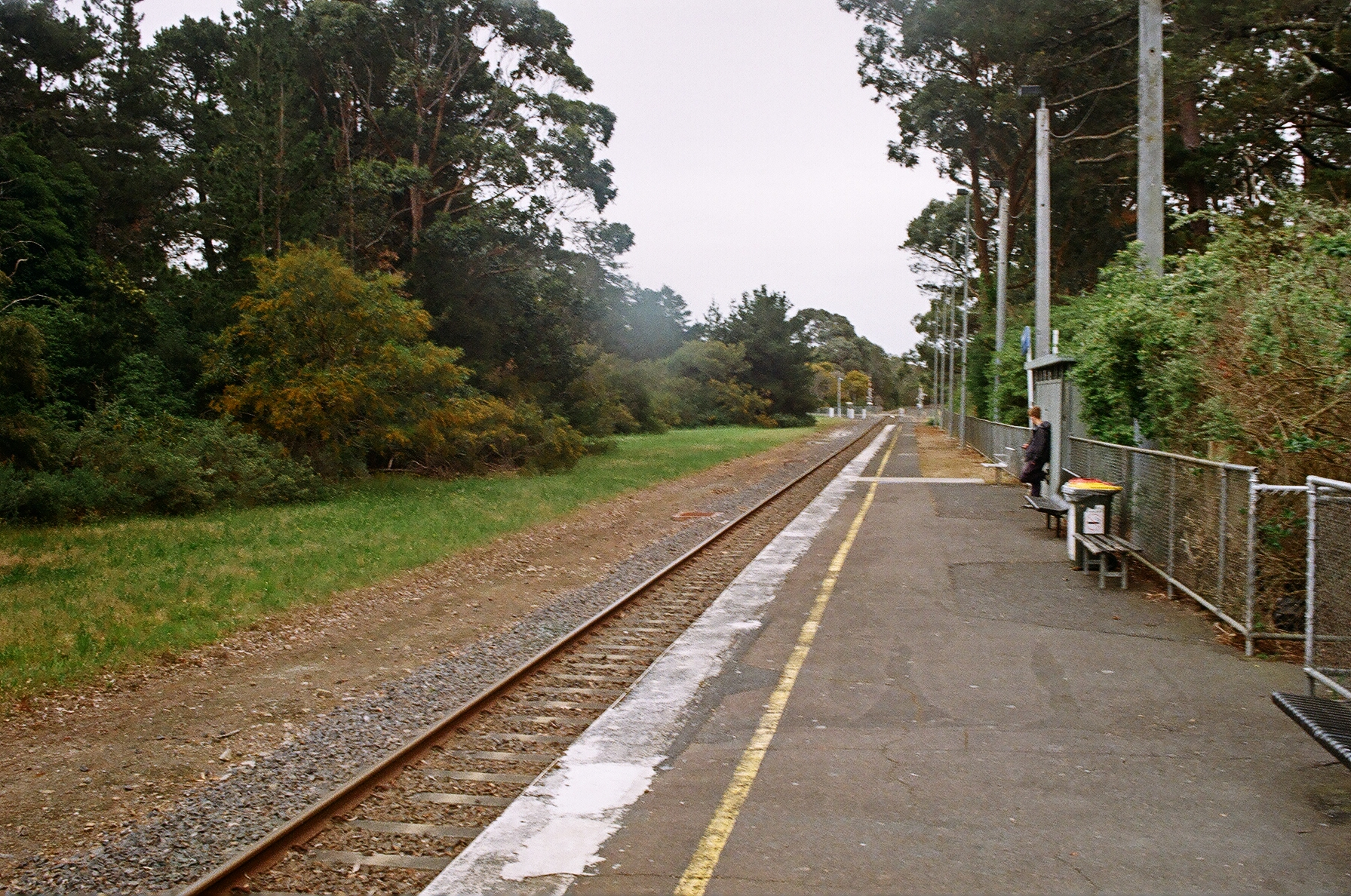
Crib point station 2025

Crib Point station opened on 17 December 1889, when the railway line from Hastings was extended to Stony Point. Like the town itself, the station was named after a hut or "crib" was built by fishermen in the 1850s.

In 1974, flashing light signals were provided at the Naval Base Road level crossing.

On 22 June 1981, the passenger service between Frankston and Stony Point was withdrawn and replaced with a bus service, with the line between Long Island Junction and Stony Point also closing on the same day. On 16 September 1984, promotional trips for the reopening of the line began and, on 27 September of that year, the passenger service was reinstated.

In February 1986, the former station building, which was of a timber construction, was replaced with the current passenger shelters.

HMAS Cerberus was also the location for the Mornington Railway Preservation Society, until it relocated to its current site at Moorooduc in 1997.

In 2006, No. 3 road was removed and, in October 2007, the last remaining road was removed. The removal of the roads coincided with the removal of a number of semaphore signals at the station as part of a signal upgrade on the Stony Point line.

In 2011, boom barriers were provided at the Naval Base Road level crossing.

== Platforms and services ==
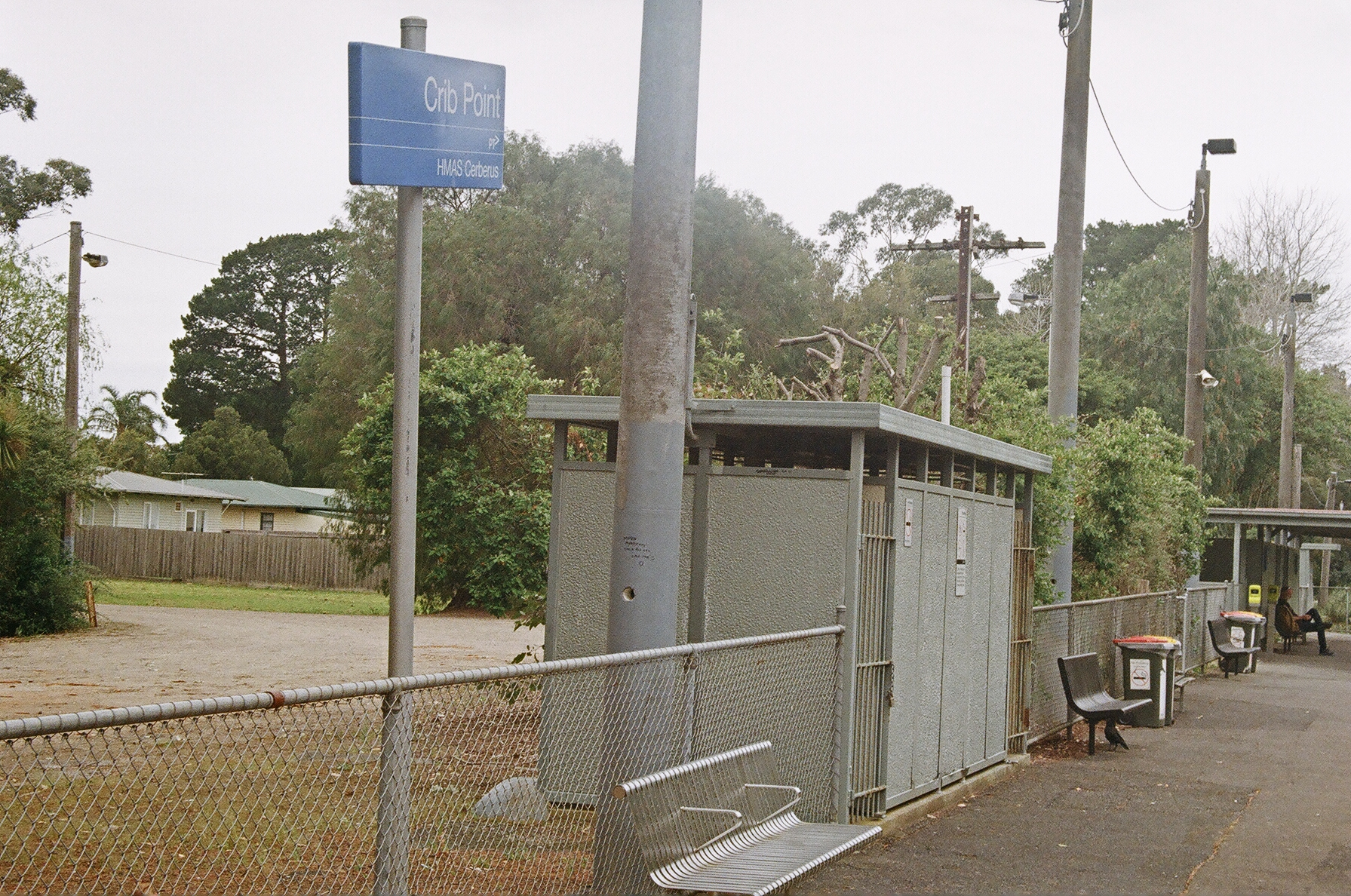
Sign

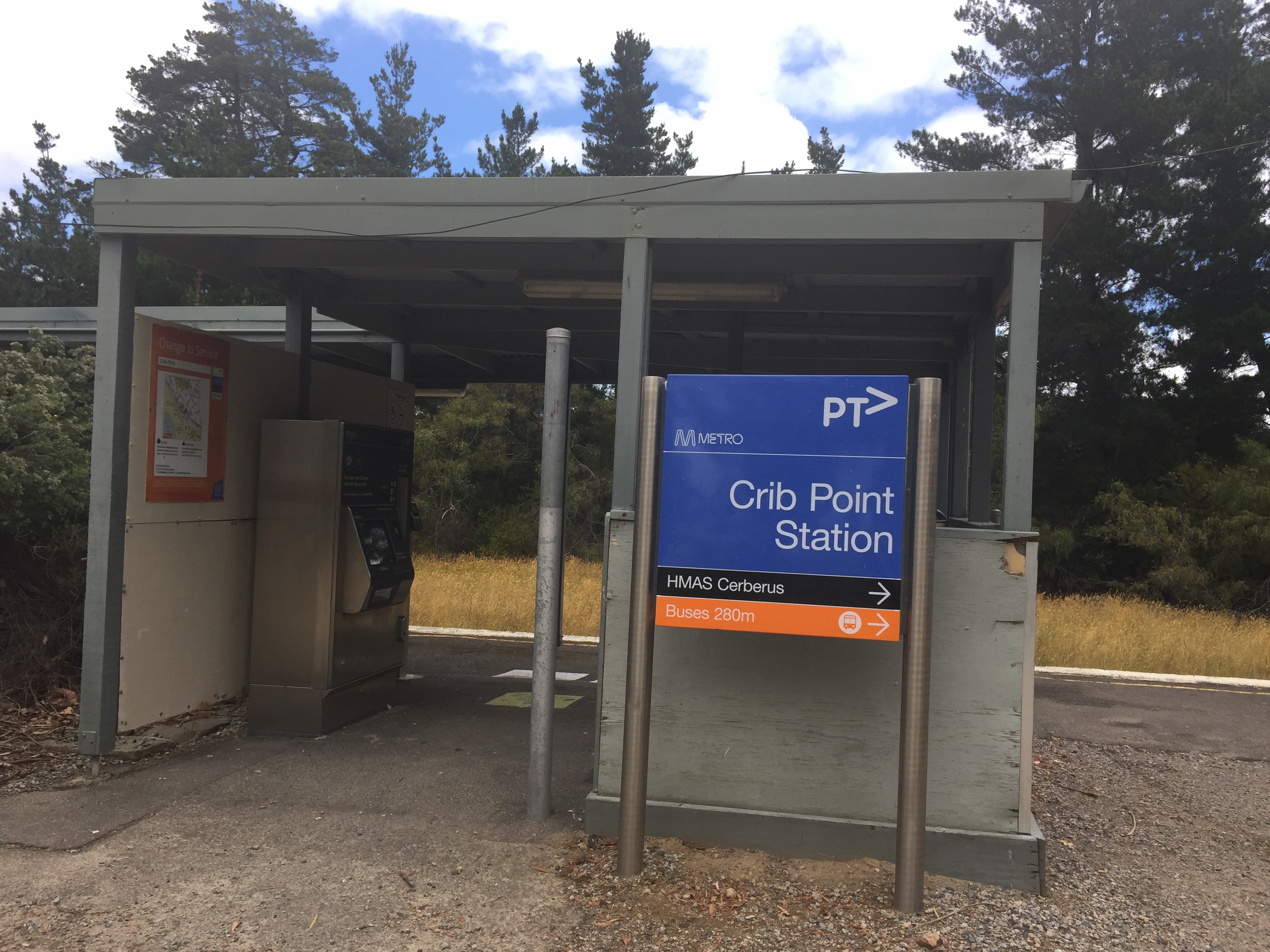
Crib Point Station in 2021

Crib Point has one platform. It is serviced by Metro Trains' Stony Point line services.

Crib Point platform arrangement
Platform	Line	Destination	Service Type	Source
1	Stony Point line	Frankston, Stony Point	All stations	

== Transport links ==
Ventura Bus Lines operates one route via Crib Point station, under contract to Public Transport Victoria:

- 782 : Frankston station – Flinders
