= Baxter railway station =

Railway station in Melbourne, Australia

Baxter
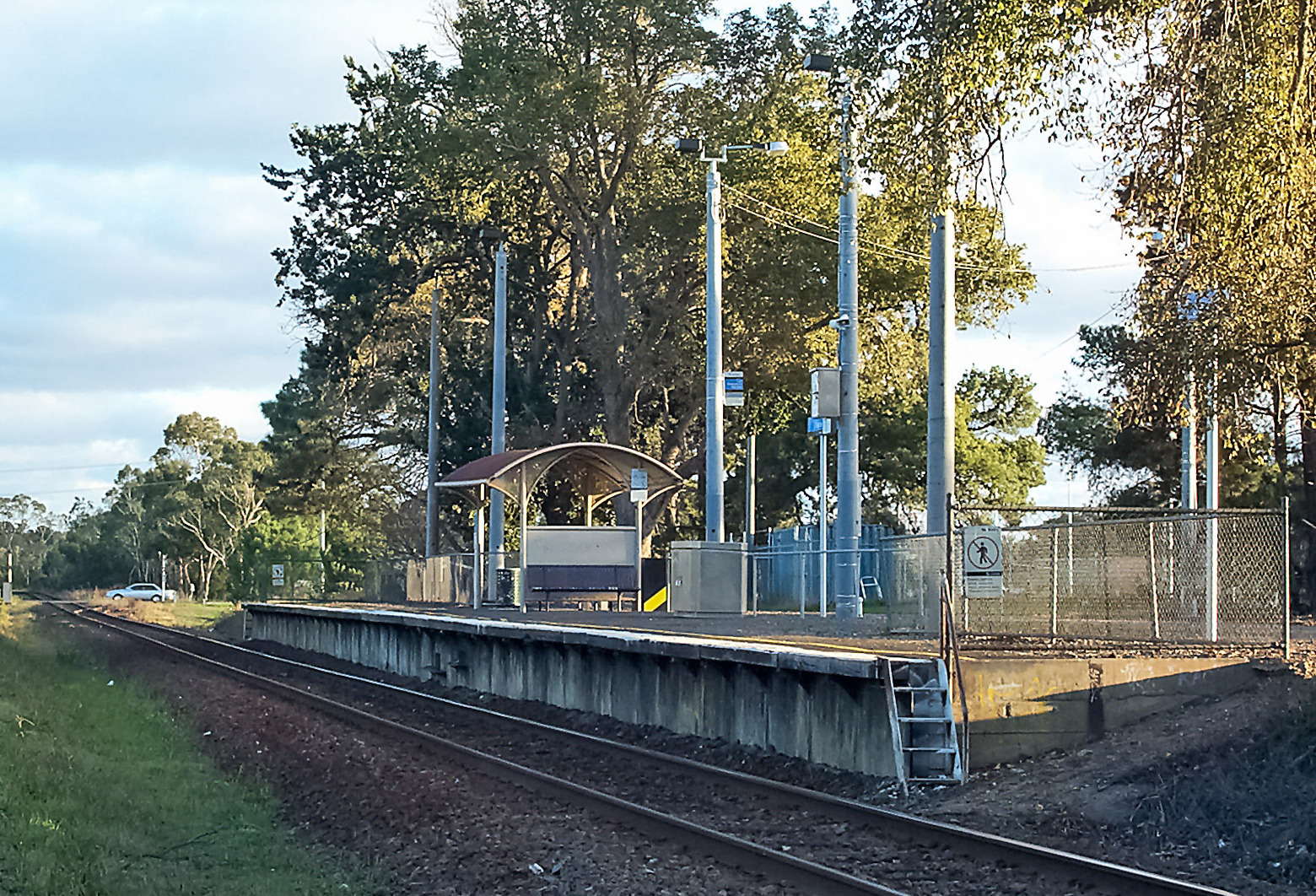
- Southbound view of the single station platform, April 2008

General information
- Location: Baxter-Tooradin Road, Baxter, Victoria 3911; Shire of Mornington Peninsula; Australia
- Coordinates: 38°11′39″S 145°09′38″E
- System: PTV commuter rail station
- Owner: VicTrack
- Operator: Metro Trains
- Lines: Stony Point (current); Mornington (formerly); Frankston (proposed)
- Distance: 51.97 kilometres from Southern Cross
- Platforms: 1
- Tracks: 1
- Connections: Bus

Construction
- Structure type: Ground
- Parking: Yes
- Accessible: Yes—step free access

Other information
- Status: Operational, unstaffed
- Station code: BXR
- Fare zone: Myki zone 2
- Website: Public Transport Victoria

History
- Opened: 1 October 1888; 137 years ago
- Closed: 22 June 1981
- Rebuilt: 27 September 1984
- Former names: Mornington Junction (1888-1918)

Passengers
- 2015–2016: 5,759
- 2016–2017: 5,057 ▼12.19%
- 2017–2018: 4,695 ▼7.15%
- 2018–2019: 3,397 ▼27.64%
- 2019–2020: 2,000 ▼41.12%
- 2020–2021: 1,850 ▼7.5%
- 2021–2022: 1,500 ▼18.91%
- 2022–2023: 2,150 ▲43.33%
- 2023–2024: 2,550 ▲18.6%
- 2024–2025: 2,500 ▼1.96%

Services
Preceding station	Metro Trains	Following station
Leawarra towards Frankston	Stony Point line	Somerville towards Stony Point
Former services
Preceding station	VicRail	Following station
Langwarrin towards Frankston	Stony Point line	Somerville towards Stony Point
Langwarrin towards Frankston	Mornington line	Moorooduc towards Mornington
List of closed railway stations in Melbourne
Track layout
Location

Baxter station is a railway station operated by Metro Trains Melbourne on the Stony Point line, which is part of the Melbourne rail network. It serves the town and suburb of Baxter, in Victoria, Australia. It opened on 1 October 1888, with the current station provided in 1984. The station was initially closed on 22 June 1981, then was reopened on 27 September 1984.

Initially opened as Mornington Junction, the station was given its current name of Baxter on 6 May 1918.

Langwarrin, a now demolished station on the Stony Point line, was located between Leawarra and Baxter.

== History ==
Baxter station opened on 1 October 1888, when the railway line from Frankston was extended. It remained a terminus until 10 September 1889, when the line was extended to Hastings and Mornington. Like the town itself, the station was named after Captain Benjamin Baxter, who was the proprietor of the nearby Carrup Carrup pastoral run.

In 1972, flashing light signals were provided at the Baxter-Tooradin Road level crossing, located nearby in the Stony Point (down) direction of the station.

Baxter was formerly the junction for the Mornington line, which was closed to traffic in 1981. The junction, which was relocated in 1962, existed at the down end of the station, though the points were spiked and the line baulked just after the level crossing. In the near future, this junction will be reinstated by the extension of the Mornington Railway, a heritage railway organisation.

On 22 June 1981, the passenger service between Frankston and Stony Point was withdrawn and replaced with a bus service. On 16 September 1984, promotional trips for the reopening of the line began and, on 27 September of that year, the passenger service was reinstated.

By March 1989, the station operated under no-one in charge conditions.

In 2009, boom barriers were provided at the Baxter-Tooradin Road level crossing.

In 2023, the Victorian branch of the Liberal Party stated that the journey to Baxter was "too slow" and urgent upgrades to the line were needed.

Also occurring in that year, the points for the junction were abolished, with the line straight railed.

== Platforms and services ==
Baxter has one platform. It is serviced by Metro Trains' Stony Point line services.

Baxter platform arrangement
Platform	Line	Destination	Service Type	Source
1	Stony Point line	Frankston, Stony Point	All stations	

== Transport links ==
Ventura Bus Lines operates one bus route via Baxter station, under contract to Public Transport Victoria:

- 776 : Frankston station – Pearcedale
