= Morradoo railway station =

Railway station in Melbourne, Australia

Morradoo
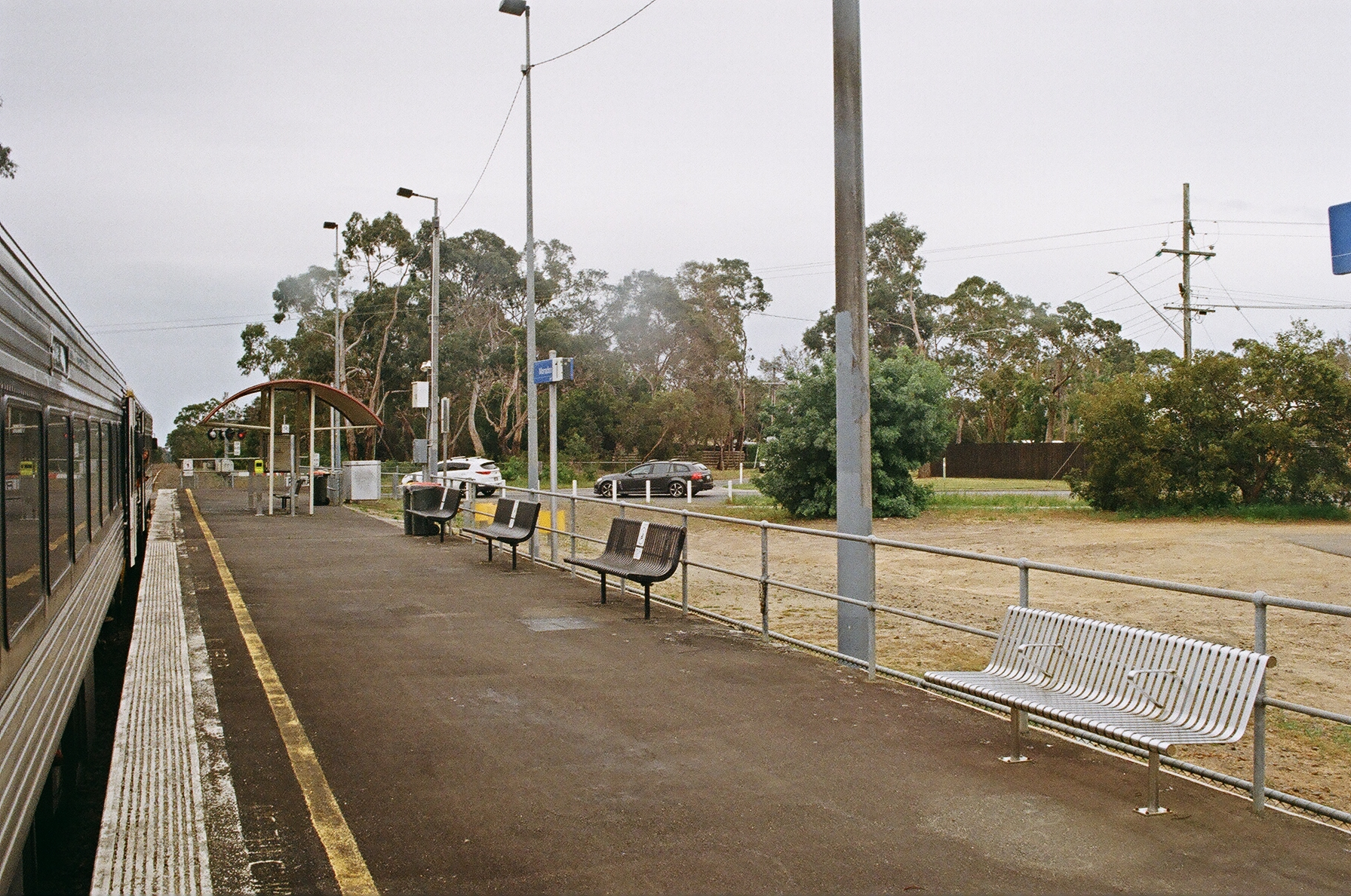
- North-west bound view from the single station platform, October 2025

General information
- Location: Campbell Street, Crib Point, Victoria 3919; Shire of Mornington Peninsula; Australia
- Coordinates: 38°21′14″S 145°11′21″E
- System: PTV commuter rail station
- Owner: VicTrack
- Operator: Metro Trains
- Line: Stony Point
- Distance: 70.96 kilometres from Southern Cross
- Platforms: 1
- Tracks: 1
- Connections: Bus

Construction
- Structure type: Ground
- Parking: 10
- Accessible: Yes—step free access

Other information
- Status: Operational, unstaffed
- Station code: MRO
- Fare zone: Myki zone 2
- Website: Public Transport Victoria

History
- Opened: 7 November 1960; 65 years ago
- Closed: 22 June 1981
- Rebuilt: November 1963; September 1984; 1996
- Former names: Rail Motor Stopping Place No. 15 (1960-1996)

Passengers
- 2016–2017: 6,206
- 2017–2018: 5,654 ▼8.89%
- 2018–2019: 5,652 ▼0.035%
- 2019–2020: 3,400 ▼39.84%
- 2020–2021: 2,200 ▼35.29%
- 2021–2022: 2,300 ▲4.54%
- 2022–2023: 3,750 ▲63.04%

Services
Preceding station	Metro Trains	Following station
Bittern towards Frankston	Stony Point line	Crib Point towards Stony Point
Track layout
Location

Morradoo station is a railway station operated by Metro Trains Melbourne on the Stony Point line, part of the Melbourne rail network. It serves the town of Crib Point in Victoria, Australia. Morradoo is a ground level unstaffed station, featuring one side platform. It opened on 7 November 1960, with the current station provided in 1996.

Initially opened as Rail Motor Stopping Place No. 15, the station was given its current name of Morradoo in 1996.

== History ==
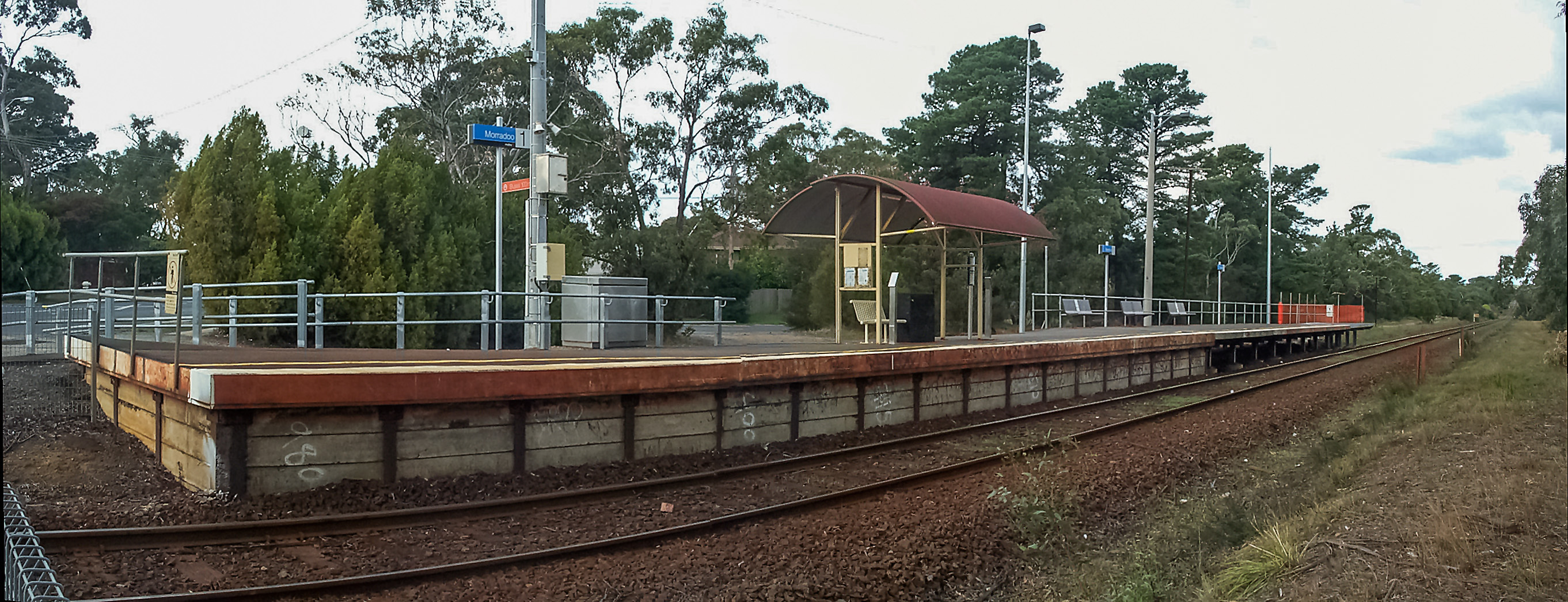
Morraddo station in 2008

By November 1963, an 80-foot (24 m) platform was provided at the stopping place. In December 1973, flashing light signals were provided at the Disney Road level crossing, located at the up end of the station.

On 22 June 1981, the passenger service between Frankston and Stony Point was withdrawn and replaced with a bus service, with the line between Long Island Junction and Stony Point also closing on the same day. On 16 September 1984, promotional trips for the reopening of the line began and, on 27 September of that year, the rail passenger service was reinstated.

In 1996, the platform was extended to 52 metres in length, and a new passenger shelter was erected. That made the platform the second-shortest with a regular service in Victoria (the shortest being at Leawarra, also on the same line). In that same year, the station was renamed as the result of a local competition, with the winning entry being Morradoo, suggested by Bree Saunders of Crib Point Primary School. Morradoo comes from an Indigenous word meaning "powder and shot", and was the original name for Crib Point.

In 2011, boom barriers were provided at the Disney Road level crossing.

== Platforms and services ==
Morradoo has one platform. It is served by Stony Point line trains.

Morradoo platform arrangement
Platform	Line	Destination	Service Type	Source
1	Stony Point line	Frankston, Stony Point	All stations	

== Transport links ==
Ventura Bus Lines operates one route via Morradoo station, under contract to Public Transport Victoria:

- 782 : Frankston station – Flinders
