= Somerville railway station =

Railway station in Melbourne, Australia

Somerville
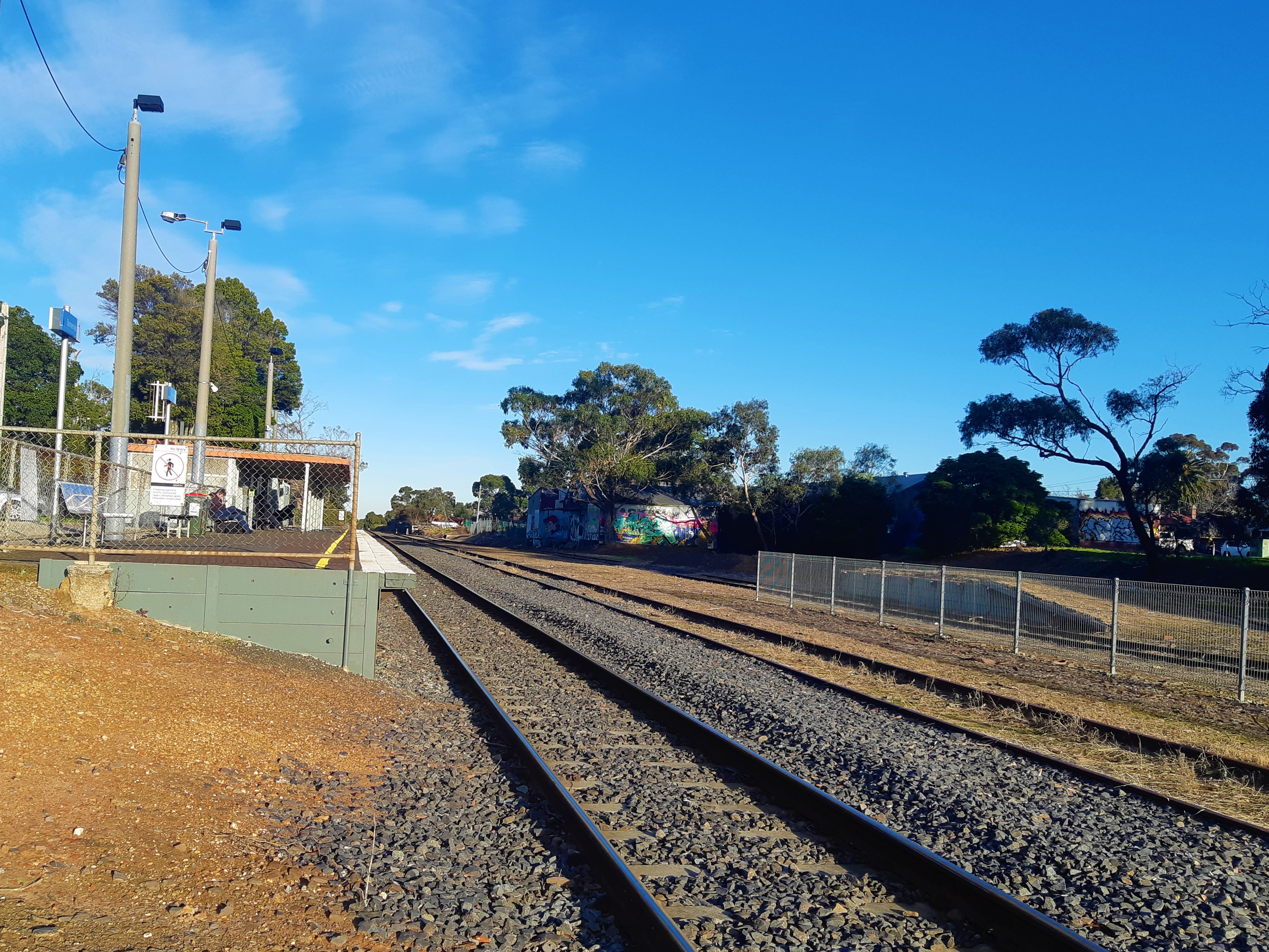
- South-east bound view of the single station platform, June 2019

General information
- Location: Station Street, Somerville, Victoria; Shire of Mornington Peninsula; Australia
- Coordinates: 38°13′31″S 145°10′34″E
- System: PTV commuter rail station
- Owner: VicTrack
- Operator: Metro Trains
- Line: Stony Point
- Distance: 55.82 kilometres from Southern Cross
- Platforms: 1
- Tracks: 1
- Connections: Bus

Construction
- Structure type: Ground
- Parking: 10
- Accessible: Yes—step free access

Other information
- Status: Operational, unstaffed
- Station code: SVE
- Fare zone: Myki zone 2
- Website: Public Transport Victoria

History
- Opened: 10 September 1889; 136 years ago
- Closed: 22 June 1981
- Rebuilt: 27 September 1984; February 1986

Passengers
- 2015–2016: 14,905
- 2016–2017: 12,272 ▼17.66%
- 2017–2018: 13,120 ▲6.91%
- 2018–2019: 13,156 ▲0.27%
- 2019–2020: 8,950 ▼31.97%
- 2020–2021: 4,950 ▼44.69%
- 2021–2022: 4,500 ▼9.09%
- 2022–2023: 7,250 ▲61.11%

Services
Preceding station	Metro Trains	Following station
Baxter towards Frankston	Stony Point line	Tyabb towards Stony Point
Track layout
Location

Somerville station is a railway station operated by Metro Trains Melbourne on the Stony Point line, part of the Melbourne rail network. It serves the town of the same name in Victoria, Australia. Somerville is a ground level unstaffed station, featuring one side platform. It opened on 10 September 1889.

== History ==
Somerville station opened when the railway line from Baxter was extended to Hastings. Like the town itself, the station was named after Sir William Meredyth Somerville, an Anglo-Irish Member of the British Parliament, for Drogheda between 1837 and 1852, and Canterbury, between 1854 and 1865.

The station opened due to rapid growth in the fruit (apples and pears) and dairy industries. The dairy industry needed a quick way of sending milk and cream to butter factories.

When the railway line reached Somerville, the station was some distance from the local school and hall which, at the time, were located on Lower Somerville Road. The town centre moved from there to its current site, adjacent to the station.

In the early years, Somerville station also operated as a post and telegraph office, and was a centre where people met as they collected their mail. The provision of special railway sidings serving new packing sheds and cool stores, over a period of six years from 1914 to 1920, supported the expansion in the apple and pear growing industry. The advent of iced T-vans made it possible to quickly transport fruit to Melbourne docks, to be loaded directly into refrigerated ships for overseas destinations.

Up until the end of World War II, a special train ran to the horticultural show at Somerville, which was reputed to be one of the biggest of its kind in Australia. The railway line also helped the fruit tree nurseries, and family-operated companies, such as Brunnings, Shepherds, Unthanks, Coles and Grants. They sent hundreds of thousands of bare-rooted trees to places such as the Goulburn Valley, the Murray Valley, and Sunraysia areas in Victoria, the Riverina districts of New South Wales, and to the Granite Belt area, centred on Stanthorpe in Queensland. The traffic was seasonal, and occurred from May to September.

The station building on the platform at Somerville was portable, meaning that it was delivered in sections and bolted together. It contained an office and a safeworking area, from which the staff and ticket system was operated. There was a van shed for small goods and parcels, two waiting rooms, one exclusively for the ladies and a general waiting room, and toilets. The building existed until February 1986, when it was replaced with an aluminium building. In the station yard, there was a general goods shed, a loading ramp, a crane, and a livestock loading facility. Later, two sidings were built for the Somerville Co-operative Cool Stores. By 2008, the up end connection to the yard was removed.

The station master's house was at the Frankston-Flinders Road entrance to the station. Two Somerville youths set fire to the house during August 2009 and it was completely destroyed. The offenders were apprehended.

The station was usually staffed by a station master but, on occasions over the years, he was assisted by a lad porter or assistant station master from Baxter. Somerville was the banking station for all stations to Stony Point, and supplied some of them with stores and stationery. Safeworking was originally by the staff and ticket system, but that was varied from time to time, until the opening of the Long Island sidings, when the electric staff system was introduced.

In 1961, flashing light signals were installed at the Eramosa Road level crossing, located nearby in the up direction from the station.

On 22 June 1981, the passenger service between Frankston and Stony Point was withdrawn and replaced with a bus service. On 16 September 1984, promotional trips for the reopening of the line began and, on 27 September of that year, the passenger service was reinstated.

In 1991, boom barriers were provided at the Eramosa Road level crossing.

== Platforms and services ==
Somerville has one platform and is served by Stony Point line trains.

Somerville platform arrangement
Platform	Line	Destination	Service Type	Source
1	Stony Point line	Frankston, Stony Point	All stations	

== Transport links ==
Ventura Bus Lines operates two routes via Somerville station, under contract to Public Transport Victoria:

- 782 : Frankston station – Flinders
- 783 : Frankston station – Hastings
