= Hastings railway station, Melbourne =

Railway station in Melbourne, Australia

Hastings
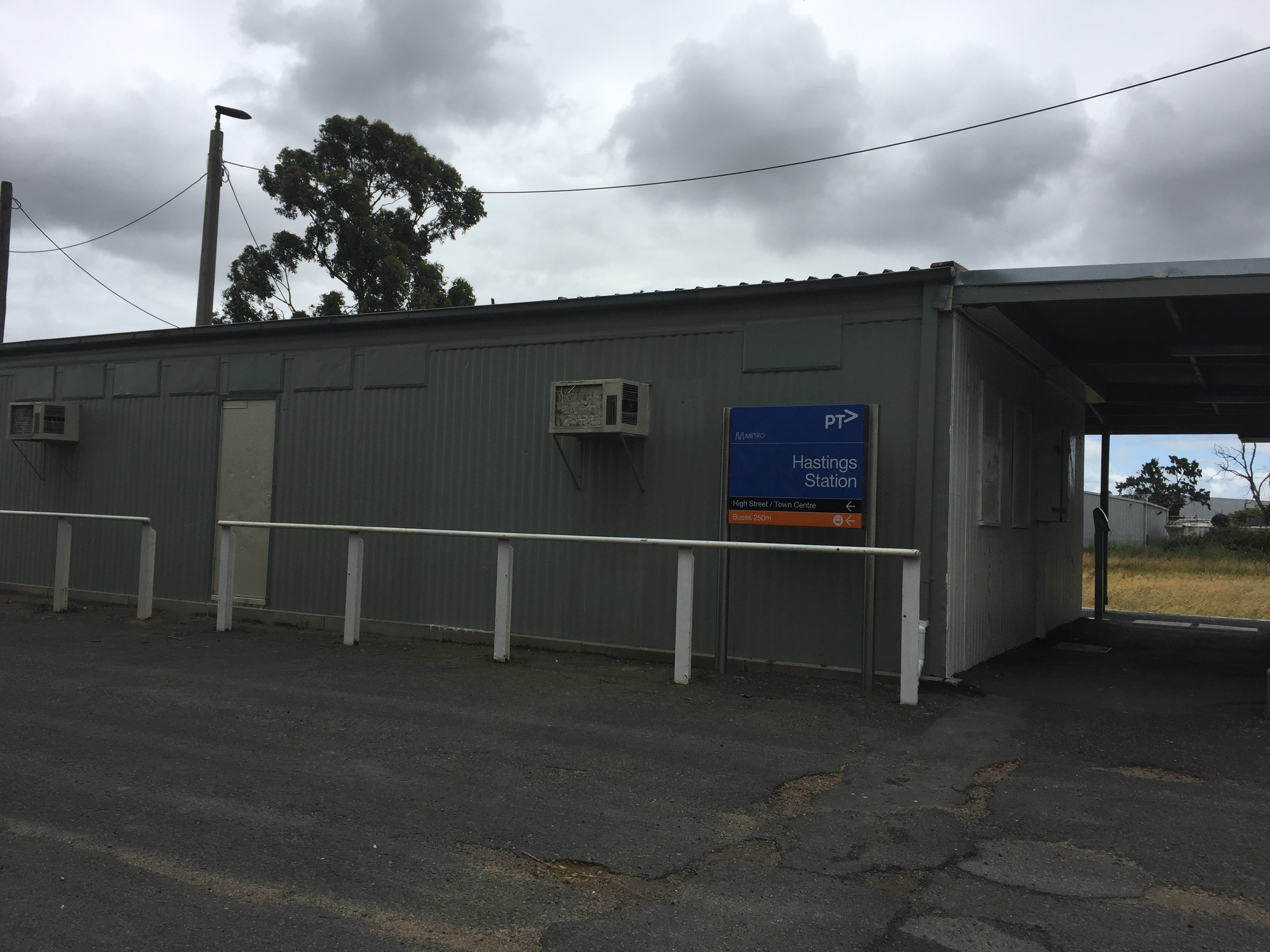
- Former station building prior to being destroyed by fire, December 2021

General information
- Location: Church Street, Hastings, Victoria 3915; Shire of Mornington Peninsula; Australia
- Coordinates: 38°18′20″S 145°11′10″E
- System: PTV commuter rail station
- Owner: VicTrack
- Operator: Metro Trains
- Line: Stony Point
- Distance: 64.99 kilometres from Southern Cross
- Platforms: 1
- Tracks: 1
- Connections: Bus

Construction
- Structure type: Ground
- Parking: Yes
- Cycle facilities: Yes
- Accessible: Yes—step free access

Other information
- Station code: HST
- Fare zone: Myki zone 2
- Website: Public Transport Victoria

History
- Opened: 10 September 1889; 136 years ago
- Closed: 22 June 1981 reopened 27 September 1984
- Rebuilt: February 1986

Passengers
- 2015–2016: 26,553
- 2016–2017: 24,488 ▼7.77%
- 2017–2018: 22,673 ▼7.41%
- 2018–2019: 21,880 ▼3.49%
- 2019–2020: 14,000 ▼36.01%
- 2020–2021: 10,500 ▼25%
- 2021–2022: 8,300 ▼20.95%
- 2022–2023: 13,350 ▲60.84%
- 2023–2024: 14,300 ▲7.12%
- 2024–2025: 10,850 ▼24.13%

Services
Preceding station	Metro Trains	Following station
Tyabb towards Frankston	Stony Point line	Bittern towards Stony Point
Track layout
Location

Hastings station is a railway station operated by Metro Trains Melbourne on the Stony Point line, part of the Melbourne rail network. It opened on 10 September 1889 and serves the town of the same name in Victoria, Australia.

The station, along with the line, was closed on 22 June 1981, but both were reopened on 27 September 1984. Hastings station once had a goods yard opposite the platform, which has been closed and the tracks removed. A disused crane remains on site. The station building dating from 1986 was burned down on 21 December 2024.

== History ==
Hastings station opened in 1889 when the railway line was extended to there from Baxter. It remained a terminus until 17 December of that year, when the line was further extended to Stony Point. Like the town itself, the station was named after Hastings in Sussex, England.

In 1962, flashing light warning signals were provided at the High Street level crossing, located nearby in the down direction from the station. In 1973, a number of roads in the former goods yard were extended.

On 22 June 1981, the rail passenger service between Frankston and Stony Point was withdrawn and replaced with a bus service, with the line between Long Island Junction and Stony Point also closing on the same day. On 16 September 1984, promotional trips for the reopening of the line to Stony Point began and, on 27 September of that year, the rail passenger service was reinstated.

In February 1986, the current station building was provided, replacing the original timber building.

In 1998, boom barriers were provided at the High Street level crossing.

In 2004, points at the up and down ends of the station were removed, and the track was straight railed.

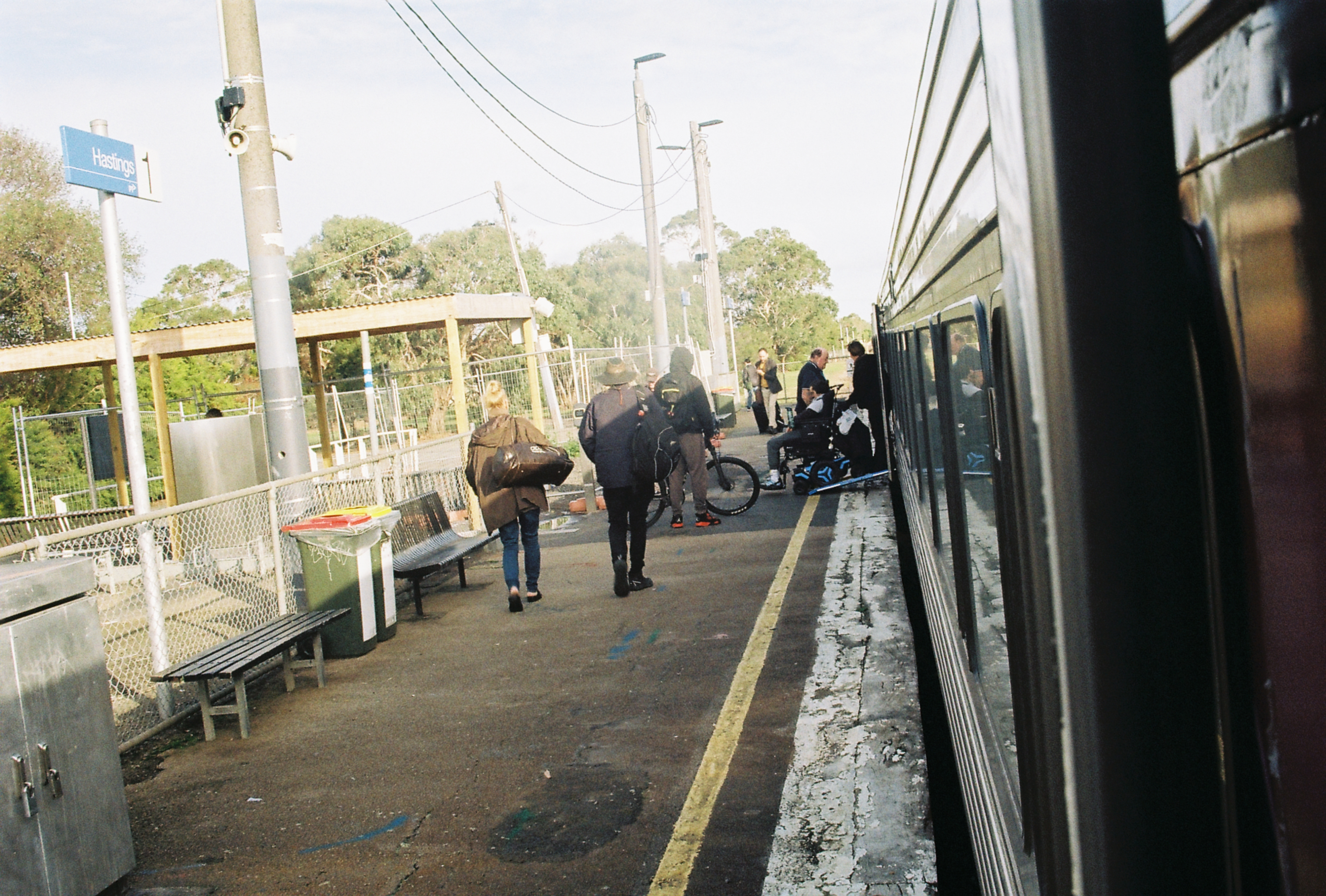
Hastings Station after fire

In the early hours of 21 December 2024, the station building was destroyed by fire, which led to temporary closure of the station and the suspension of services on the Stony Point line for a day.

== Platforms and services ==
Hastings has one platform and is served by Stony Point line trains.

Hastings platform arrangement
Platform	Line	Destination	Service Type	Source
1	Stony Point line	Frankston, Stony Point	All stations	

== Transport links ==
Ventura Bus Lines operates one route via Hastings station, under contract to Public Transport Victoria:

- 782 : Frankston station – Flinders

== Gallery ==
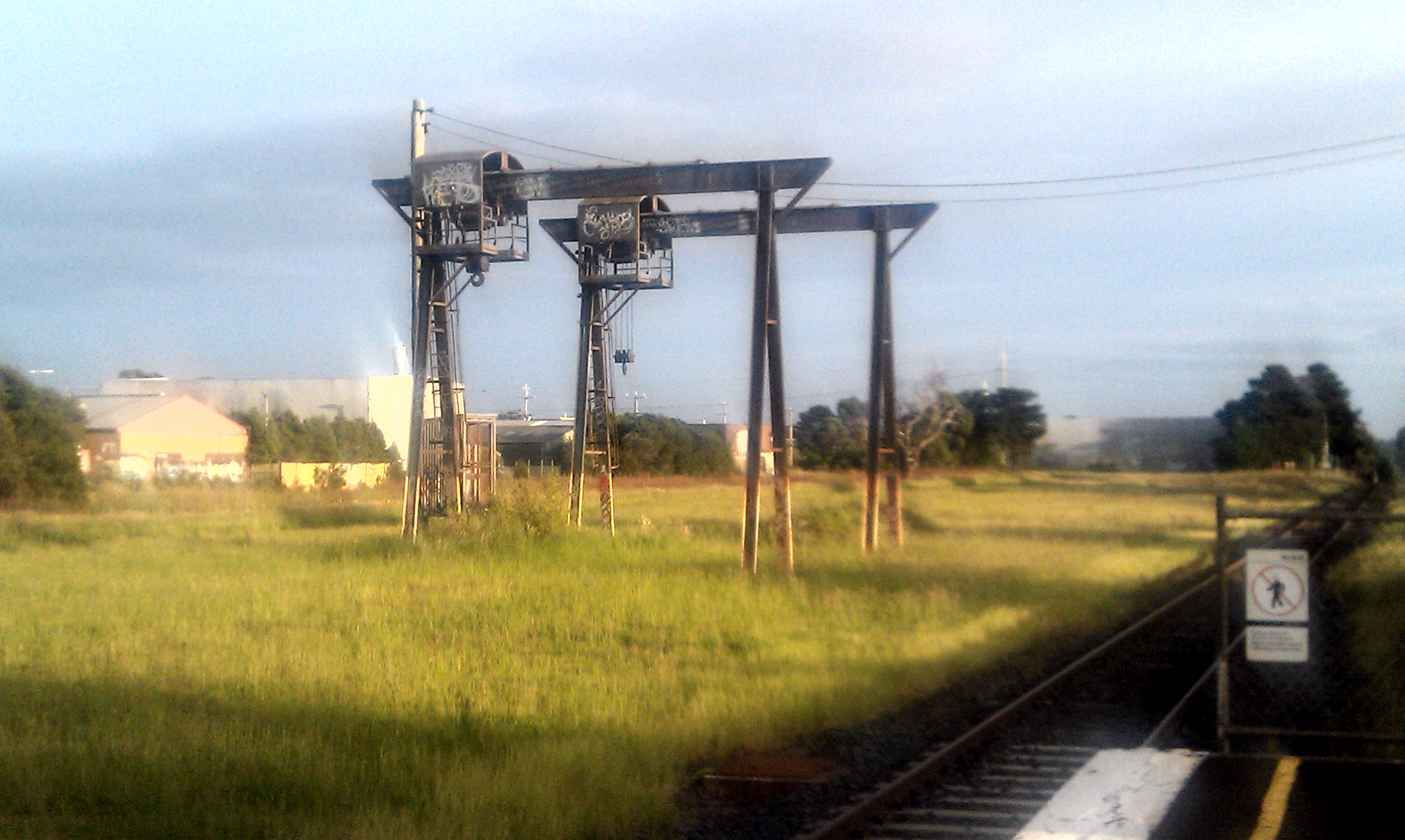
Disused crane at the up end of the station, November 2012

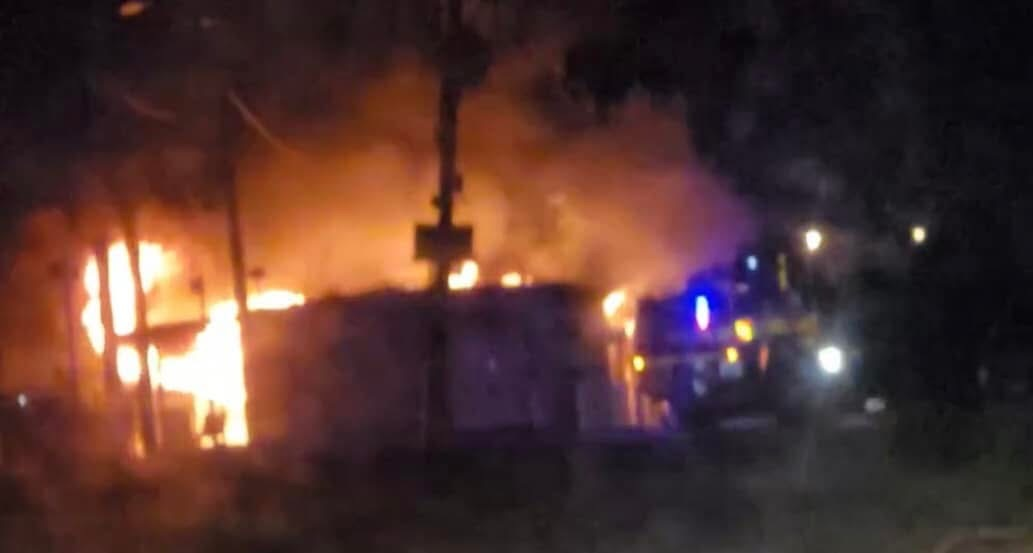
Hastings station fire, 21 December 2024

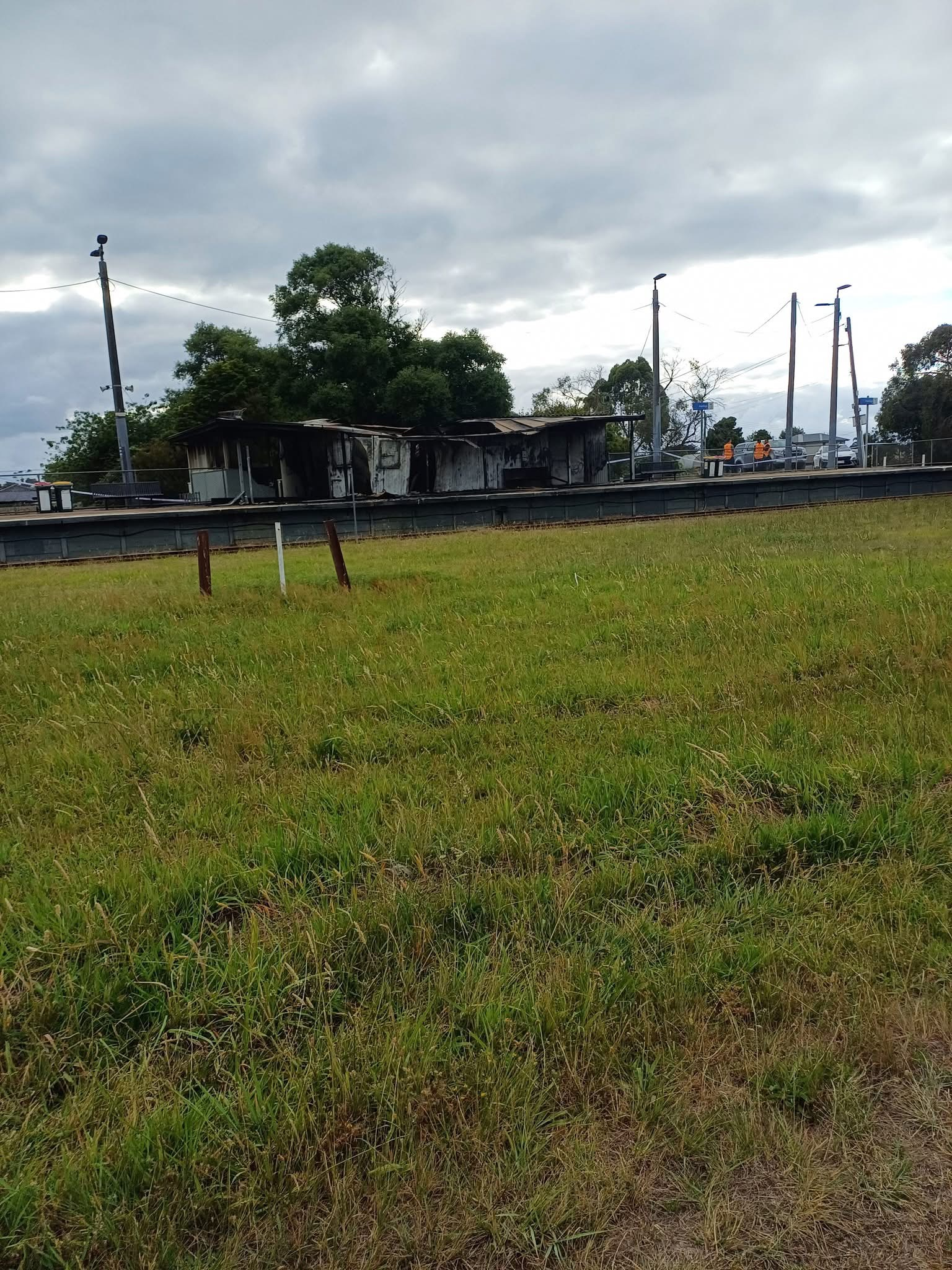
Hastings station after fire, 21 December 2024

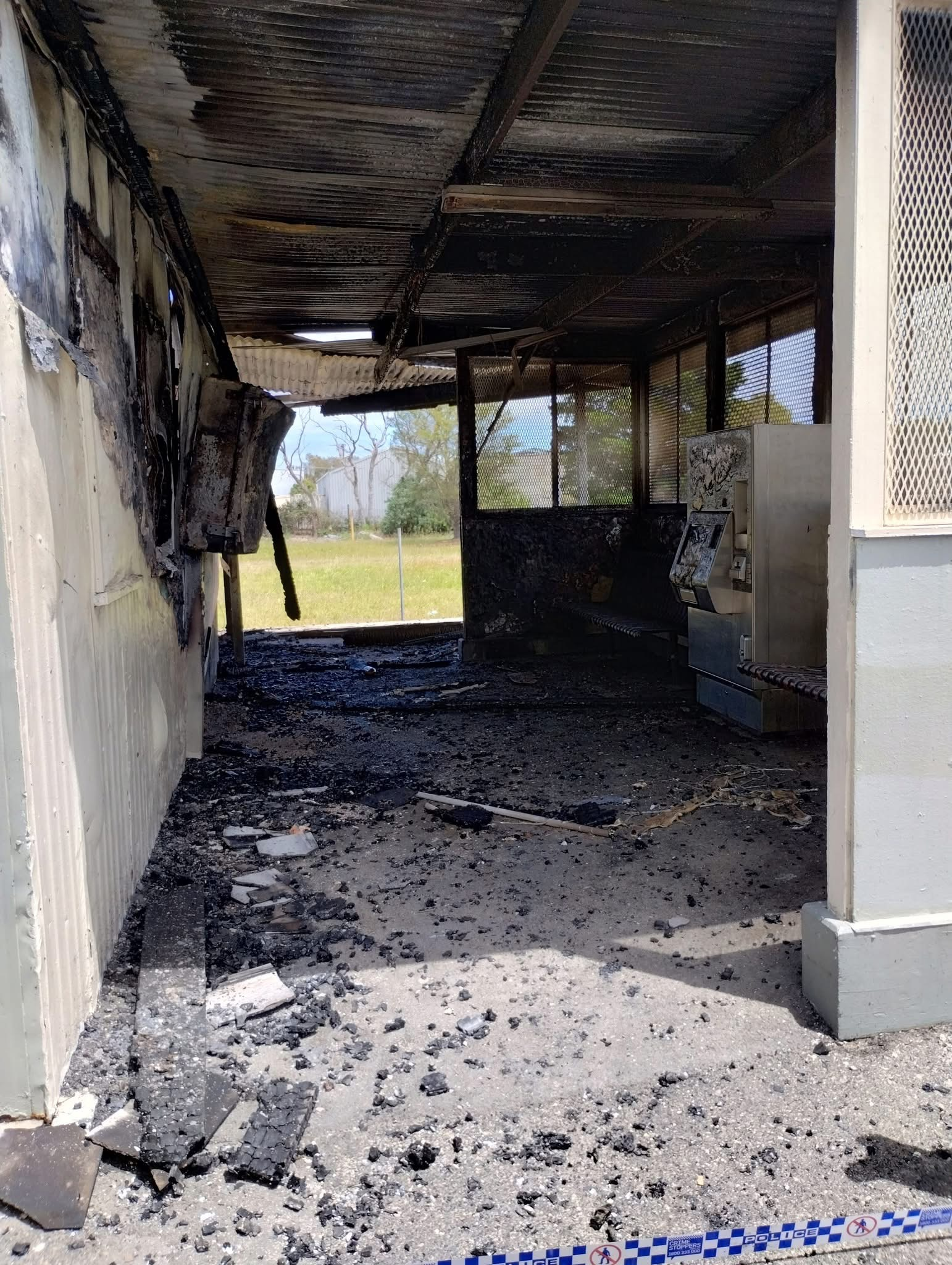
Hastings station building after fire, 21 December 2024

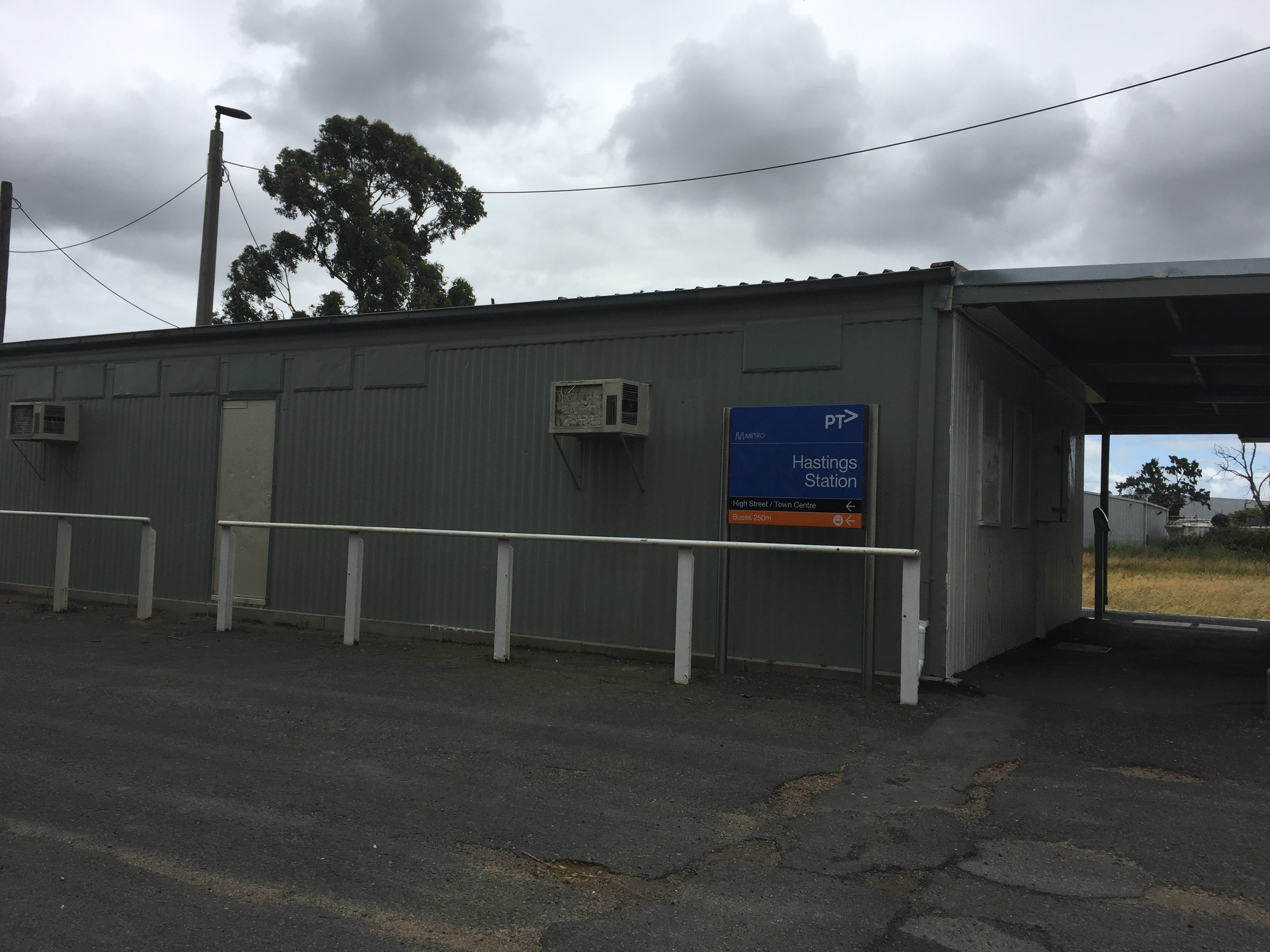
Former station front
