= Stony Point line =

Passenger rail service in metropolitan Melbourne, Victoria, Australia

Stony Point

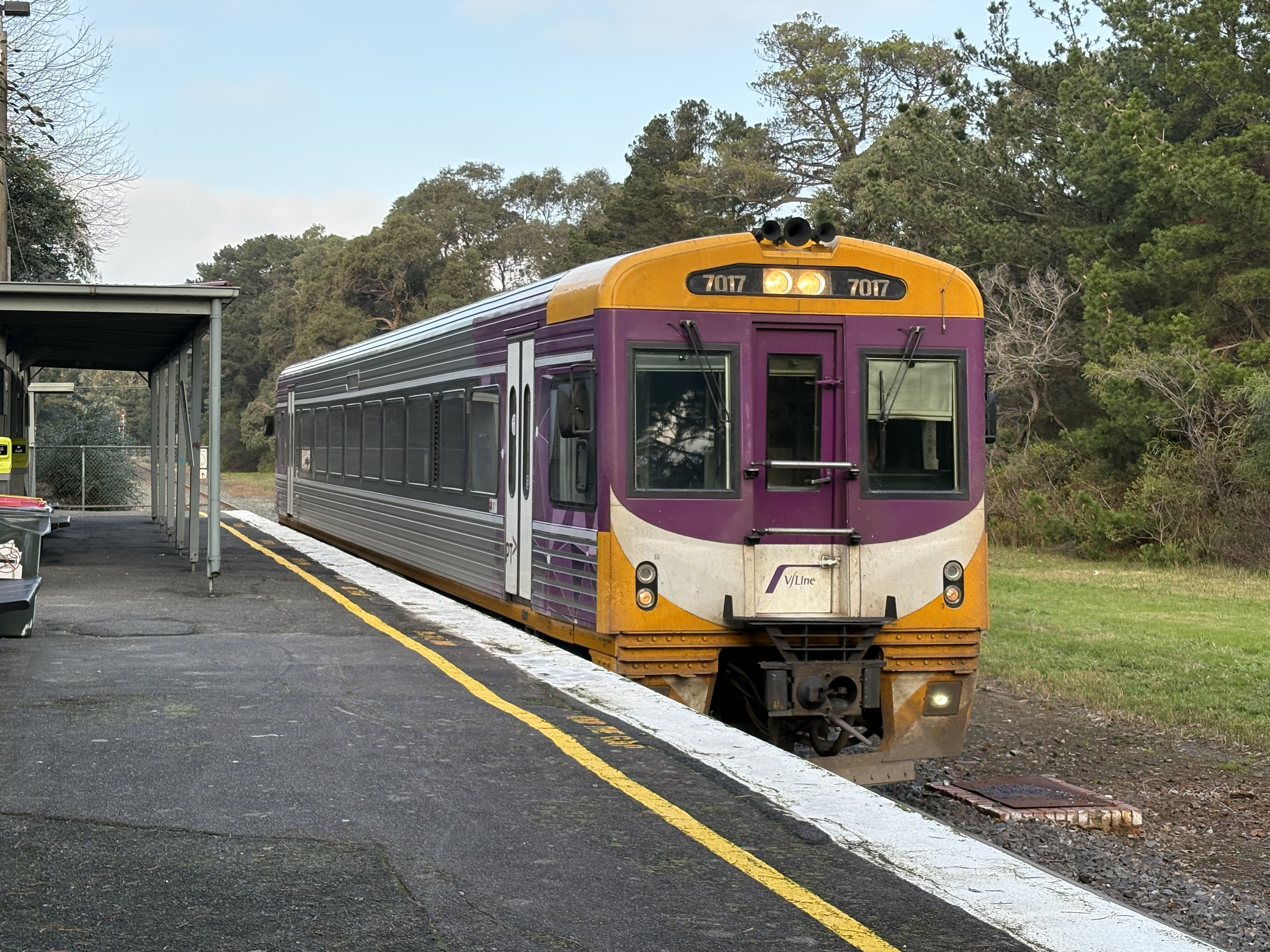
- Sprinter train at Crib Point station in 2026

Overview
- Service type: Commuter rail
- System: Melbourne railway network
- Status: Operational
- Locale: Melbourne, Victoria, Australia
- Predecessor: Baxter (1888–1889); Stony Point (1889–1981); Tyabb (1981–1984)
- First service: 1 October 1888; 138 years ago
- Current operator: Metro Trains
- Former operators: Victorian Railways (VR) (1889–1974); VR as VicRail (1974–1983); STA (V/Line) (1983–1989); PTC (V/Line) (1989–1998); Bayside Trains (1998–2000); M>Train (2000–2004); Connex Melbourne (2004–2009)

Route
- Termini: Frankston; Stony Point
- Stops: 10
- Distance travelled: 31 km (19 mi)
- Average journey time: 36 minutes
- Service frequency: 90–120 minutes
- Line used: Stony Point

Technical
- Rolling stock: Sprinter DMU
- Track gauge: 1,600 mm (5 ft 3 in)
- Track owner: VicTrack

The Stony Point line is a commuter railway line in the outer metropolitan area of Melbourne, Victoria, Australia. Operated by Metro Trains Melbourne, it is the only diesel service on the metropolitan network and, at 31 kilometres (19 mi), is the tenth-longest line. It is an extension of the Frankston line, with services running from Frankston station to Stony Point, serving 10 stations in all. The line is also used for freight services to the Port of Hastings.

The line was opened in three sections during 1888 and 1889. Only two stations have been added since its completion—Leawarra and Morradoo. In recent years, there have been proposals to extend the electrified Frankston line to Baxter.

== History ==
=== 19th century ===
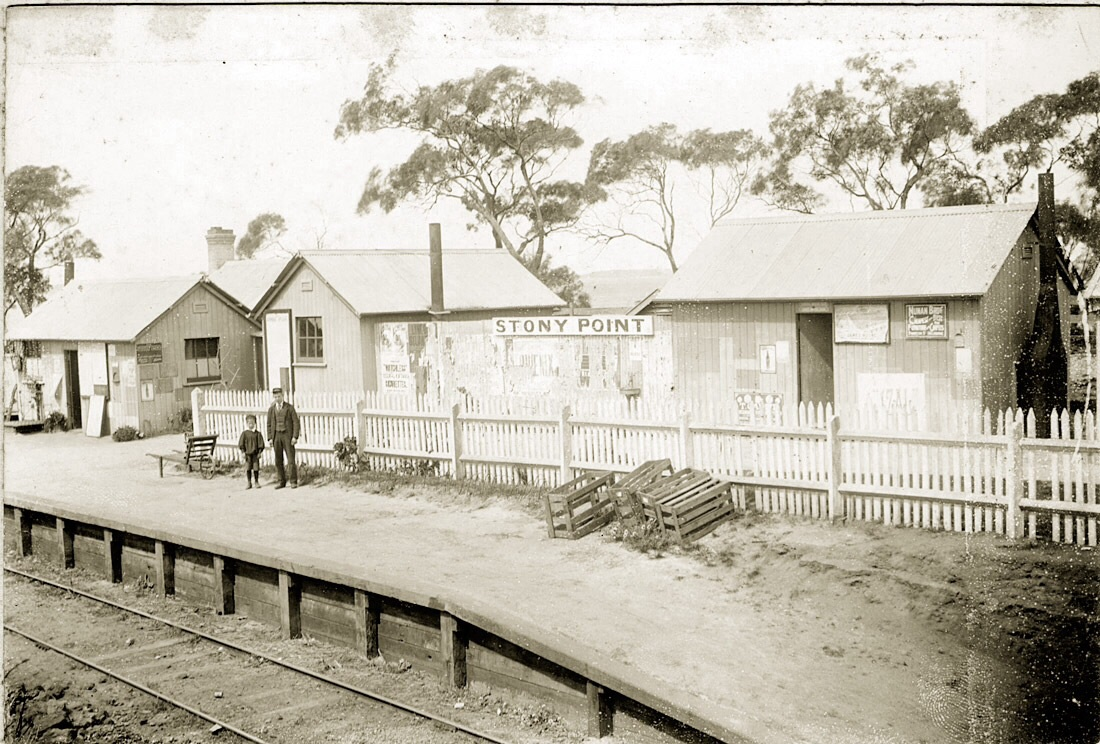
Stony Point station in 1892

The Stony Point line was initially opened from Frankston to Baxter station, with services commencing in 1888. Extensions to Hastings, Bittern, and Stony Point were completed in the following year. Branch lines were opened from Baxter to Mornington in 1889, and from Bittern to Red Hill in 1921.

=== 20th century ===
In 1959, a new station was opened at Leawarra (originally called Railmotor Stopping Place No. 16), and Morradoo (originally called Railmotor Stopping Place No. 15) was opened a year later.

The Red Hill branch was closed in 1953, and the Mornington branch was closed in 1981. A 300-metre (980 ft)-long branch from Long Island Junction to Long Island was opened on 29 April 1969 to serve the adjacent steel mill.

Passenger services on the line were withdrawn on 10 June 1981, and the line from Long Island Junction to Stony Point was closed on 22 June 1981. Services were recommenced on 27 September 1984. After the reopening, DRC railcars were used, with two MTH carriages in between them, making up a four-carriage train. Frequent breakdowns of the railcars led to diesel locomotives often being called in to haul the consist as an alternative. For example, from 25 July to 10 August 1986 the service was provided by MTH101-MTH102-14ZLP, worked by engines Y149, Y155, T348, T391, T402, T347 or T351. By November 1987 the engines were being swapped over daily to avoid excessive wear on the brake blocks, compared to normal mainline operation.

In August 1994, a T class locomotive hauling two MTH carriages was used but, by November 1995, weekday services were being operated by a P class with two MTH carriages. On weekends, an A class diesel was used, hauling an extra MTH car. On one occasion, an X class diesel, in V/Line Freight livery was employed, hauling three MTH carriages. Those configurations were not used after V/Line was separated into passenger and freight divisions.

=== 21st century ===
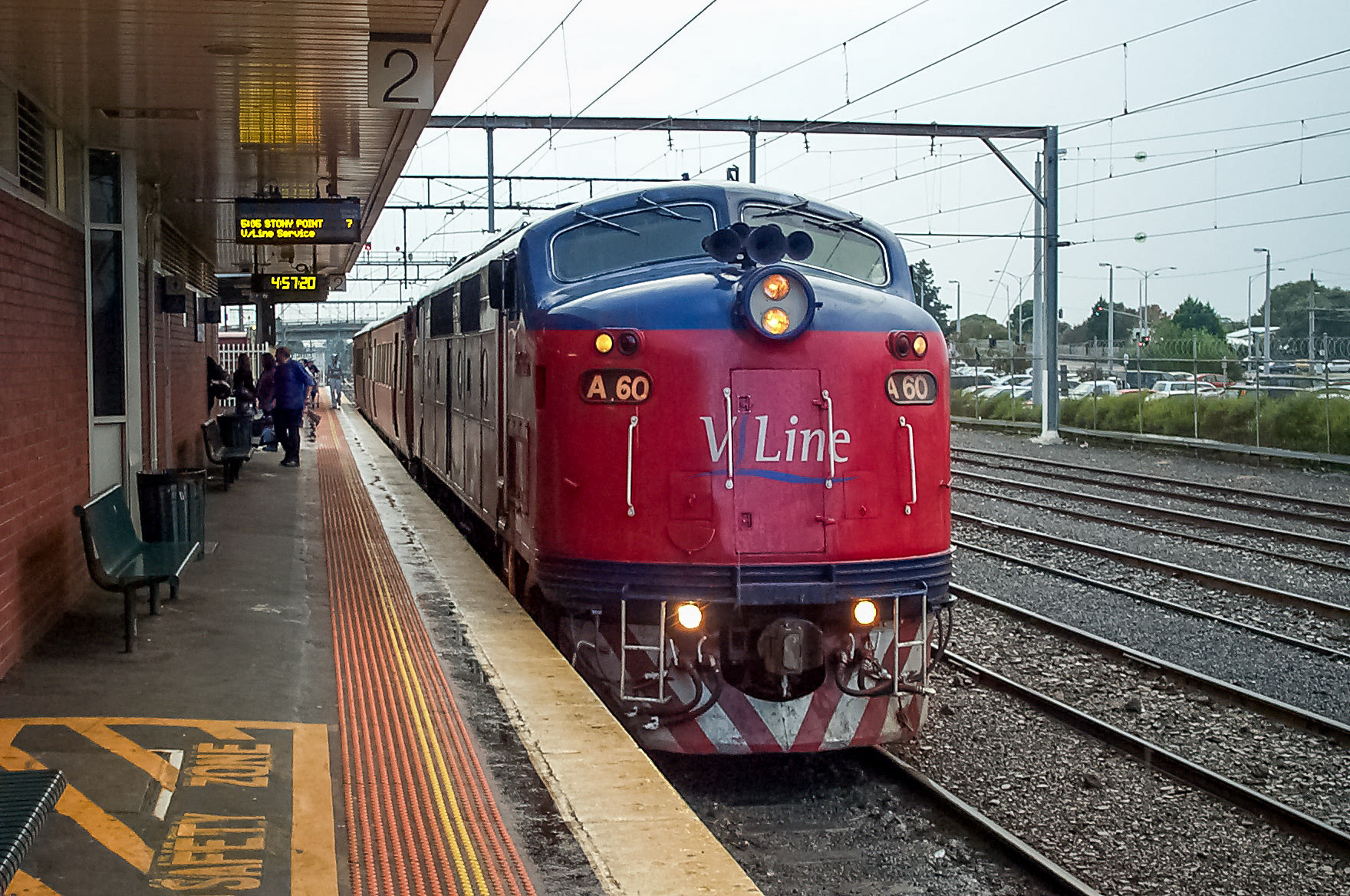
A V/Line A-class locomotive on a Stony Point train at Frankston station, 2008

Few changes occurred in the 2000s as the service settled down, following the period of frequent changes to the operators, services, and rolling-stock. Sometimes, when train operator V/Line had a locomotive shortage, locomotives leased from Freight Australia and, later, Pacific National appeared, in their green and yellow livery. In 2008, the Stony Point line underwent major re-signalling work, including the introduction of three-position signalling. The new signalling system was controlled remotely from the Frankston Signal Box.

In April 2008, Sprinter units began providing the passenger service. Two units usually operated the service, with a single unit returning to Southern Cross for servicing on a regular basis, and another sent in the opposite direction to replace it.

Malfunctions of boom gates forced the closure of the line for three months in 2015.

== Future ==
=== Baxter extension ===
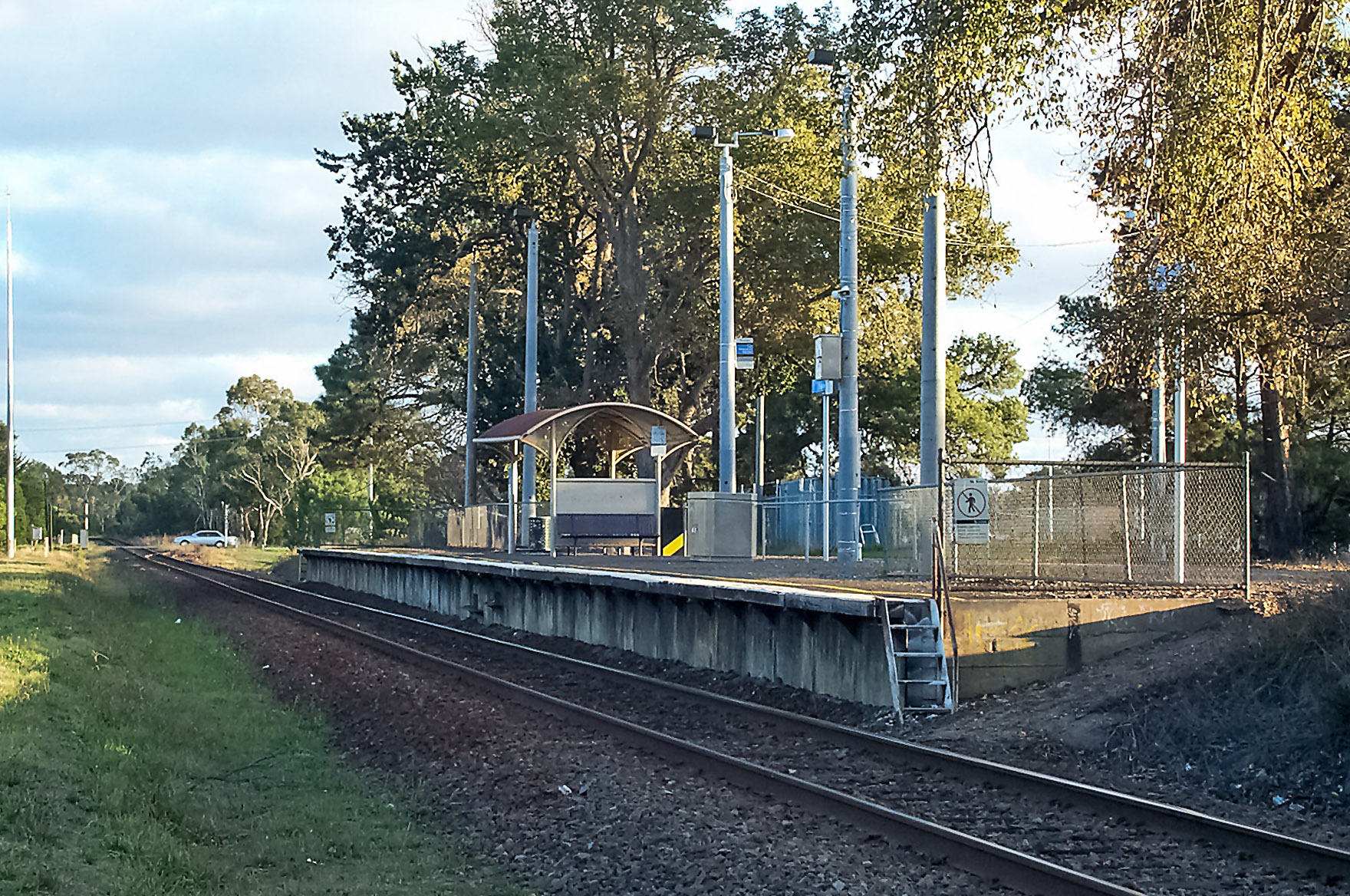
Baxter station, 2008

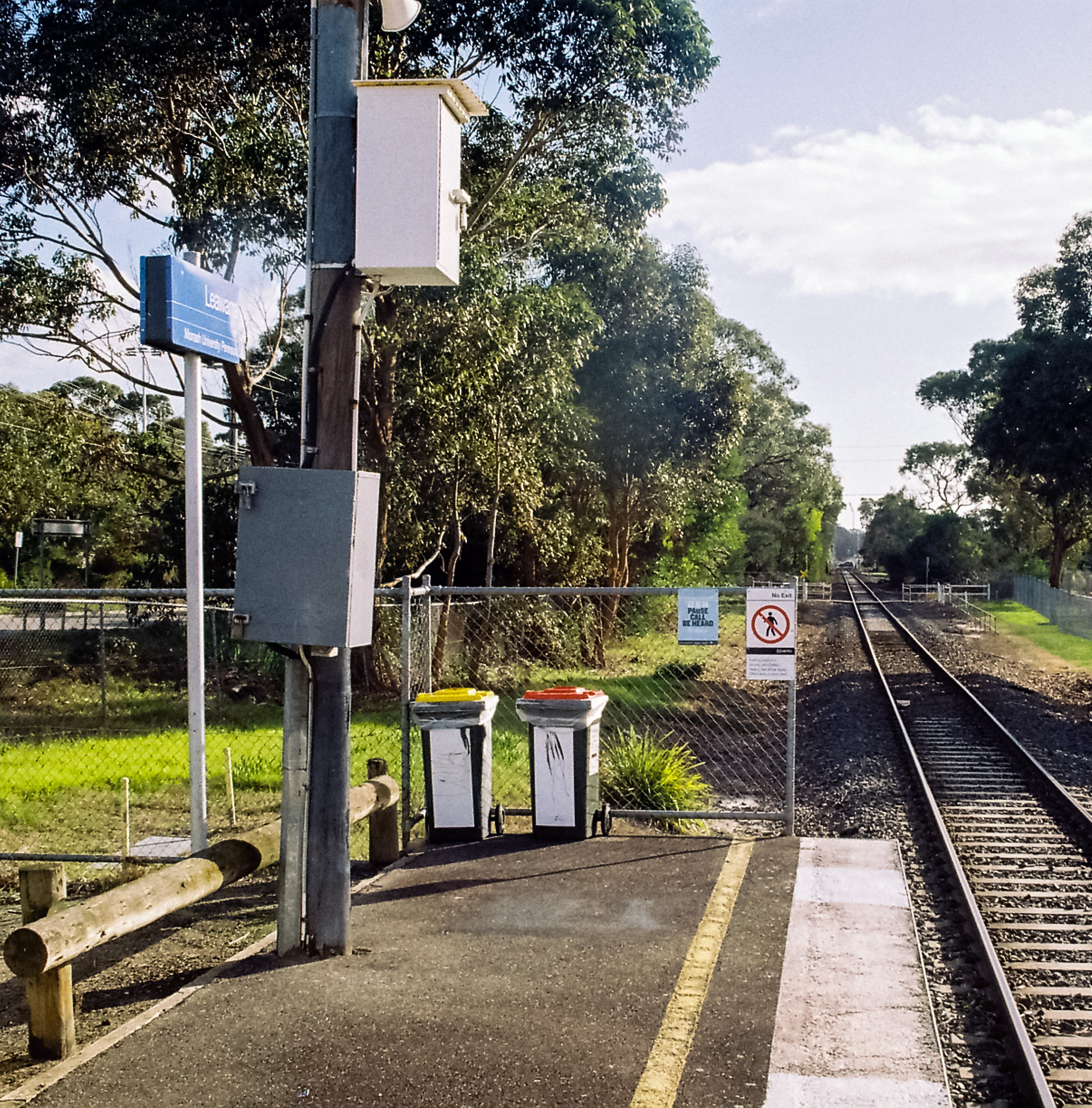
Leawarra station in 2025

In 2013, as part of Public Transport Victoria's Network Development Plan for metropolitan rail, an extension of the Frankston line to Baxter was earmarked to begin in the "long-term" (over the next 20 years). During the 2018 state election, the Liberal Party announced a project to extend electrified services to Baxter. The project would have included the removal of all crossings between Frankston and Baxter, duplication and electrification works, the construction of one (or two) new stations, and the reconstruction of stations along the corridor. The Federal Liberals announced $450 million of joint funding for the project promised between the state and federal governments, with the national government promising to provide $225 million of the funding. The incumbent Andrews Labor government argued that the project was not needed, instead prioritising funding to other projects across the state.

A business case commissioned by the government was completed in 2019 with no further progress being made.

Again in the lead up to the 2022 state election, the Liberal opposition supported the electrification to Baxter. The second Andrews government made no commitments to the Baxter rail extension, instead continuing construction on level crossing removal works along the Frankston line. The 2022 state election resulted in another Labor victory, with the Andrews government pushing ahead with these works.

In November 2023, a review of infrastructure investment, commissioned by the federal government, found that the Baxter rail extension did not meet the "investment priorities" of the Albanese government and would lose its $225 million in federal funding.

== Network and operations ==
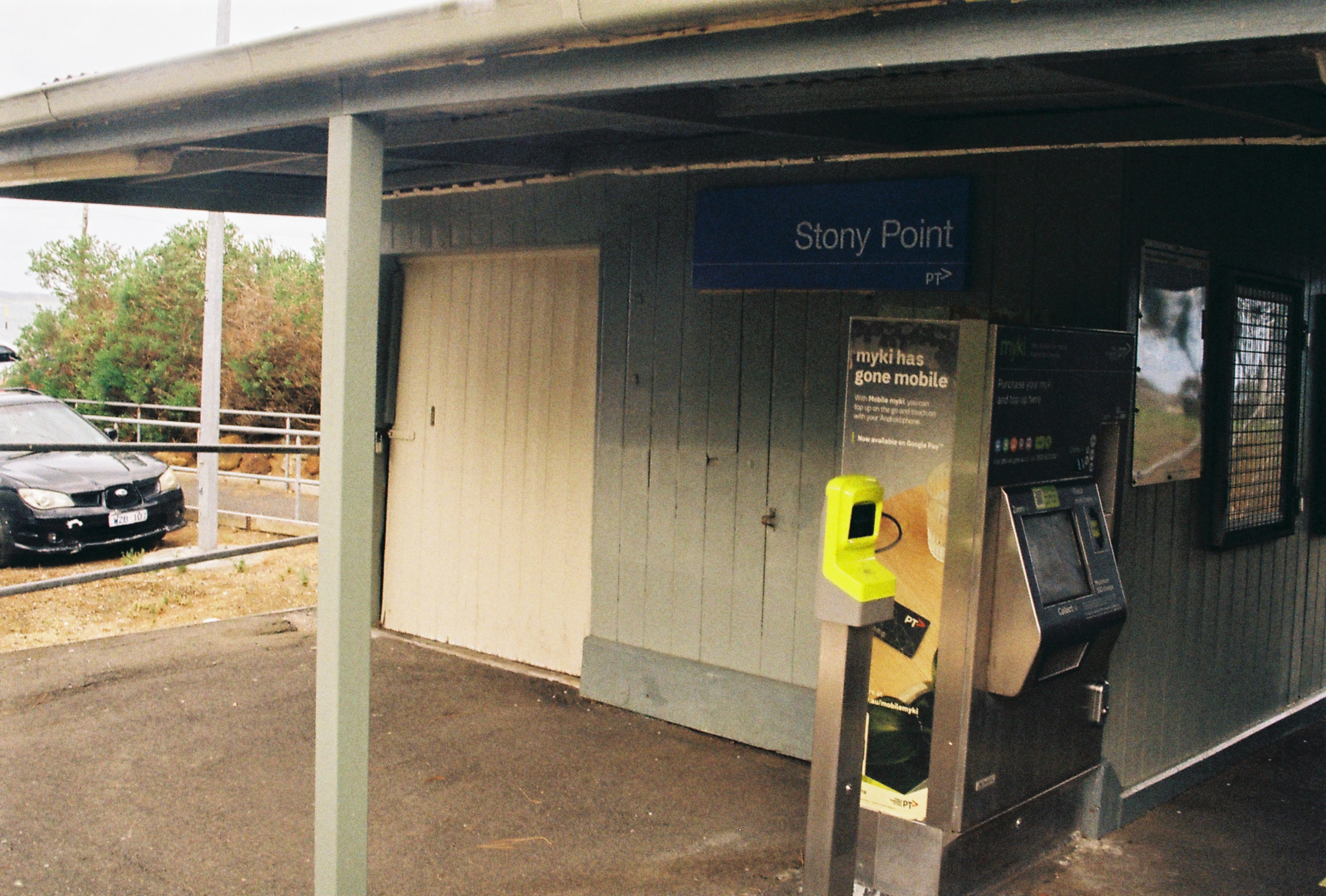
Myki reader at Stony point station

=== Services ===
The line operates for approximately 13 hours a day, from about 5:30 am to around 10:30 pm from Monday to Friday, and 7:00 am to 8:30 pm on Saturdays and Sundays. Train frequency is typically every 90 to 120 minutes throughout the day due to the line being single track with no passing loops. Unlike the rest of Melbourne's rail network, services do not run 24 hours a day on Friday nights and weekends.

Freight movements typically occur twice daily, with Qube Holdings operating trains to the Long Island steel mill and the Port of Hastings. Trains to Melbourne run at approximately 4:00 am and during the mid-afternoon, while trains from Melbourne run at around midnight and noon.

Train services on the Stony Point line are also subjected to maintenance and renewal works, usually on selected Fridays and Saturdays. Shuttle bus services are provided throughout the duration of works for affected commuters.

==== Stopping patterns ====
Legend — Station status

- ◼ Premium Station – Station staffed from first to last train
- ◻ Host Station – Usually staffed during morning peak, however this can vary for different stations on the network.

Legend — Stopping patterns

- ● – All trains stop
- ◐ – Some services do not stop
- | – Trains pass and do not stop

Stony Point Services
Station	Zone	Stony Point
◼ Frankston	2	●
Leawarra	2	●
Baxter	2	●
Somerville	2	●
Tyabb	2	●
Hastings	2	●
Bittern	2	●
Morradoo	2	●
Crib Point	2	●
Stony Point	2	●

=== Operators ===
The Stony Point line has had a number of operators since its opening in 1889. The Victorian Railways, the State Transport Authority, the Public Transport Corporation and V/Line operated the line successively until the privatisation of the Melbourne rail network in 1998. On 1 July 1998, operation of the Stony Point line was transferred from V/Line. V/Line was privatised in 1999 but returned to government ownership in 2003. V/Line has operated the Stony Point service on behalf of three different Melbourne private rail operators in succession: M>Train, Connex, and Metro Trains.

Operators of the Stony Point line:
Operator	Commenced operations	Ceased operations	Length of operations
Victorian Railways	1889	1983	94 years
State Transport Authority	1983	1989	6 years
Public Transport Corporation	1989	1998	9 years
V/Line for Bayside Trains (government operator)	1998	1999	1 years
V/Line for M>Train	1999	2004	5 years
V/Line for Connex Melbourne	2004	2009	5 years
V/Line for Metro Trains Melbourne	2009	incumbent	16 years (ongoing)

=== Route ===
Stony Point line in south-east Melbourne.

The Stony Point line is predominantly single track, with few curves and minimal earthworks for most of it length. The only duplicated sections are at each end of the line.

Apart from some suburban and light industrial development near Frankston, the line passes through open countryside with occasional small settlements.

Stony Point (physical track)

Overview
- Status: Operational with passenger services from Frankston to Stony Point and freight services to the Port of Hastings
- Owner: Victorian Railways (VR) (1888–1974); VR as VicRail (1974–1983); STA (V/Line) (1983–1989); PTC (V/Line) (1989–1997); VicTrack (1997–Current)
- Locale: Melbourne, Victoria, Australia
- Termini: Frankston; Stony Point
- Continues from: Frankston line
- Connecting lines: Frankston; Port of Hastings sidings
- Former connections: Red Hill; Mornington; HMAS Cerberus naval base
- Stations: 10 current stations; 2 former stations; 1 current siding; 1 former siding

Service
- Services: Stony Point, Port of Hastings freight trains

History
- Work began: 1 October 1888
- Opened: To Baxter on 1 October 1888; To Hastings on 10 September 1889; To Stony Point on 17 December 1889
- Completed: 17 December 1889
- Reopened: Port of Hastings junction to Stony Point on 27 September 1984
- Closed: Port of Hastings junction to Stony Point on 22 June 1981

Technical
- Line length: 31 km (19 mi)
- Num of tracks: Single track
- Track gauge: 1,600 mm (5 ft 3 in)
- Operating speed: 95 km/h (59 mph) - DMU; 65 km/h (40 mph) - Diesel
- Signalling: Automatic and Track Control
- Maximum incline: 1 in 50 (2%)

=== Stations ===
The line serves 10 stations across 31 kilometres (19 mi) of track. All stations are at ground level.

Station	Accessibility	Opened	Terrain	Train connections	Other connections
Frankston	Yes—step free access	1882	Ground level	1 connection: Frankston line	Buses
Leawarra	Yes—step free access	1905	Ground level		Buses
Baxter	Yes—step free access	1888	Ground level		Buses
Somerville	Yes—step free access	1889	Ground level		Buses
Tyabb	Yes—step free access	1889	Ground level		Buses
Hastings	Yes—step free access	1889	Ground level		Buses
Bittern	Yes—step free access	1889	Ground level		Buses
Morradoo	Yes—step free access	1960	Ground level		Buses
Crib Point	Yes—step free access	1889	Ground level		Buses
Stony Point	Yes—step free access	1889	Ground level		Stony Point railway station#Transport links

Station histories
Station	Opened	Closed	Age	Notes
Frankston	1 August 1882		144 years	
Leawarra	30 November 1959		66 years	Formerly Railmotor Stopping Place No. 16; Shortest platform with a regular rail passenger service in Victoria (44 metres (144 ft))
Construction Sand Limited Siding	5 September 1928	11 March 1941	12 years	
Langwarrin	1 October 1888	22 June 1981	92 years	
Baxter	1 October 1888		138 years	Formerly Mornington Junction
Somerville	10 September 1889		137 years	
Tyabb	10 September 1889		137 years	
BlueScope Steel - Coil Siding	12 September 1972		54 years	Part of the Port of Hastings
BlueScope Steel - Slab Siding	4 December 1986		39 years	Part of the Port of Hastings
Esso Siding	29 April 1969		57 years	Formerly Cresco Siding; Part of the Port of Hastings
Hastings	10 September 1889		137 years	
Bittern	17 December 1889		136 years	
Morradoo	7 November 1960		66 years	Formerly Railmotor Stopping Place No. 15; Second shortest platform with a regular rail passenger service in Victoria (52 metres (171 ft))
HMAS Cerberus Naval Base	6 July 1914	22 June 1981	66 years	
Crib Point	17 December 1889	22 June 1981	91 years	
Crib Point	27 September 1984		42 years	
Stony Point	17 December 1889	22 June 1981	91 years	
Stony Point	27 September 1984		42 years	

== Infrastructure ==
=== Rolling stock ===
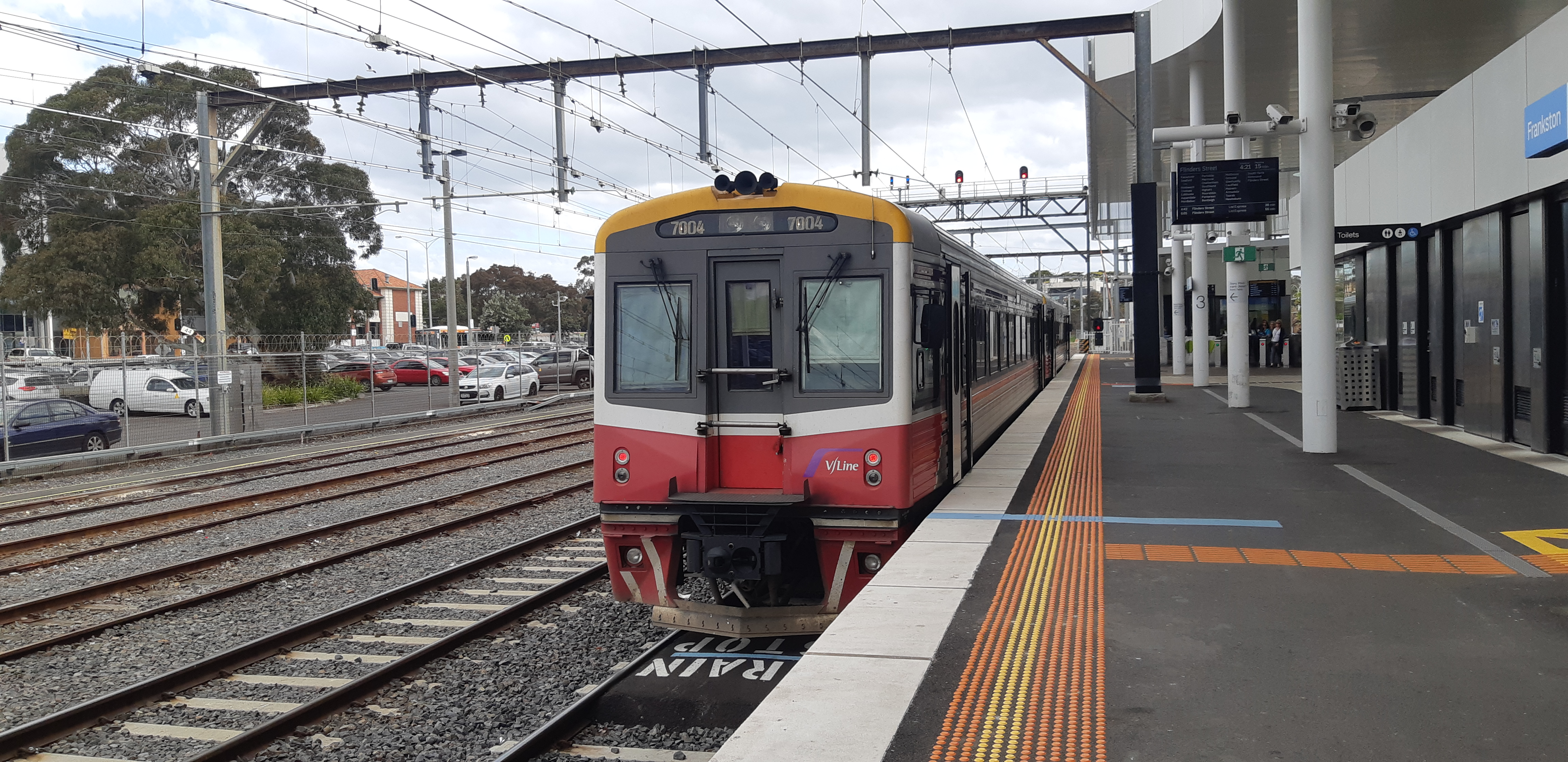
V/Line Sprinter, which usually operates services on the line, 2019

The Stony Point line uses V/Line Sprinter diesel multiple unit (DMU) trains operating in a one- or two-car configuration, accommodating up to 90 passengers in each car. The trains are refuelled and serviced near Southern Cross station.

=== Accessibility ===
As required by the Disability Discrimination Act of 1992, all new or re-built stations must comply with accessibility guidelines. All stations on the corridor are fully accessible—a first in Melbourne.

=== Signalling ===
In common with most of the Melbourne train network, the Stony Point line uses three position signalling, which became fully operational on the line in March 2008.
