= Stony Point railway station =

Railway station in Melbourne, Australia

Stony Point
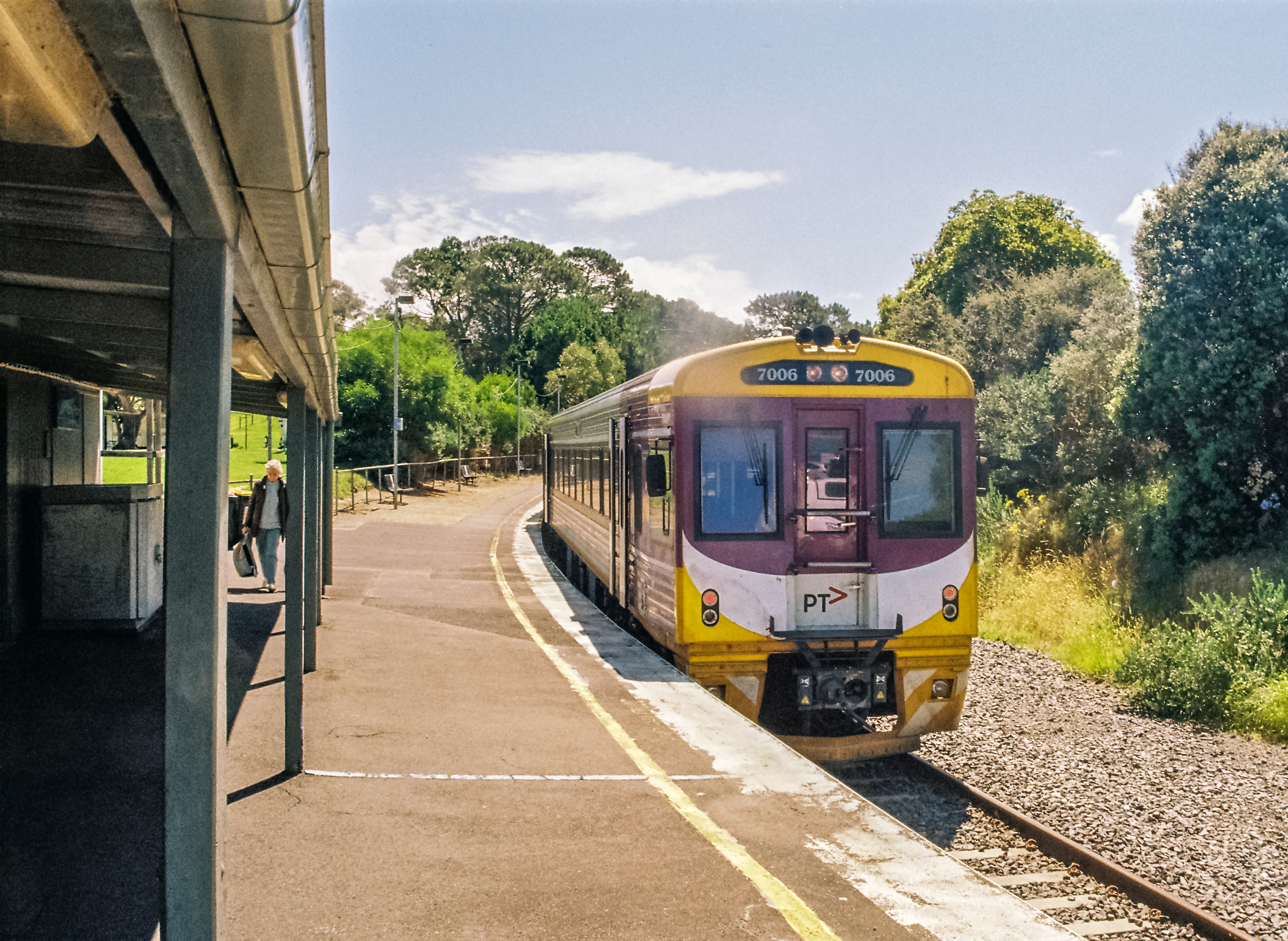
- Northbound view from the station platform, with a V/Line Sprinter at the platform, December 2024

General information
- Location: Stony Point Road, Crib Point, Victoria 3919; Shire of Mornington Peninsula; Australia
- Coordinates: 38°22′27″S 145°13′18″E
- System: PTV commuter rail station
- Owner: VicTrack
- Operator: Metro Trains
- Line: Stony Point
- Distance: 74.59 kilometres from Southern Cross
- Platforms: 1
- Tracks: 2
- Connections: Ferry

Construction
- Structure type: Ground
- Parking: Yes
- Accessible: Yes—step free access

Other information
- Status: Operational, unstaffed
- Station code: STY
- Fare zone: Myki zone 2
- Website: Public Transport Victoria

History
- Opened: 17 December 1889; 136 years ago
- Closed: 10 June 1981
- Rebuilt: 27 September 1984

Passengers
- 2015–2016: 6,545
- 2016–2017: 5,974 ▼8.72%
- 2017–2018: 5,271 ▼11.76%
- 2018–2019: 5,386 ▲2.18%
- 2019–2020: 4,350 ▼19.23%
- 2020–2021: 3,900 ▼10.34%
- 2021–2022: 3,600 ▼7.69%
- 2022–2023: 5,500 ▲52.77%

Services
Preceding station	Metro Trains	Following station
Crib Point towards Frankston	Stony Point line	Terminus
Track layout
Location

Stony Point railway station is a railway station operated by Metro Trains Melbourne and the terminus of the Stony Point line, part of the Melbourne rail network. It serves the town of Crib Point in Victoria, Australia. Stony Point is a ground level unstaffed station, featuring one side platform. It opened on 17 December 1889, with the current station provided in 1984. It initially closed on 10 June 1981, then reopened on 27 September 1984.

== History ==
In 1910, a turntable was provided at the station. By November 1960, it was out of use and, by March 1963, was abolished.

In 1976, a siding at the up end of the station was removed. The following year, in 1977, the goods yard was closed.

On 22 June 1981, the passenger service between Frankston and Stony Point was withdrawn and replaced with a bus service, with the line between Long Island Junction and Stony Point also closing on the same day. On 16 September 1984, promotional trips for the reopening of the line began and, on 27 September of that year, the passenger service was reinstated.

A run-around loop exists to the north and west of the station, but has not been regularly used since locomotive hauled services ceased in April 2008.

In June 2014, the platform length was reduced from around 150 metres to 103 metres. This was done as the extra length used for longer locomotives was no longer required.

== Platforms and services ==
Stony Point has one platform. It is serviced by Metro Trains' Stony Point line services.

Stony Point platform arrangement
Platform	Line	Destination	Service Type	Source
1	Stony Point line	Frankston	All stations	

== Transport links ==
A jetty is located near the station, from which ferry services operate to Tankerton, on French Island, and Cowes, on Phillip Island.

== Gallery ==
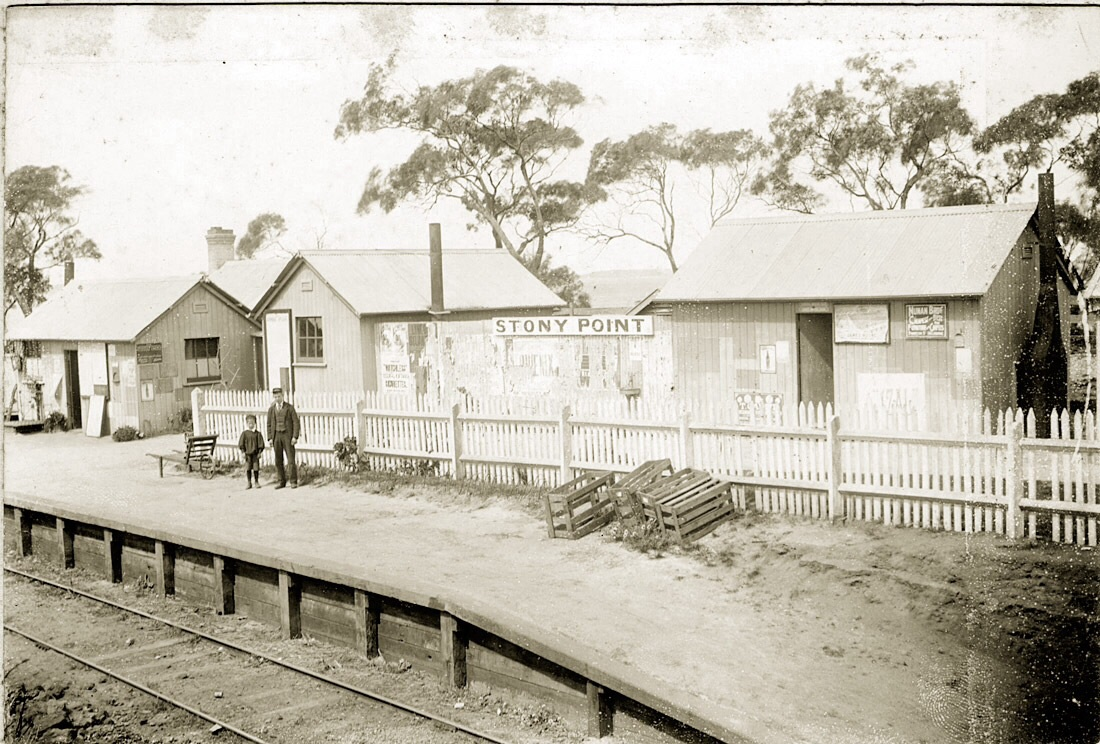
Station building and platform, April 1892

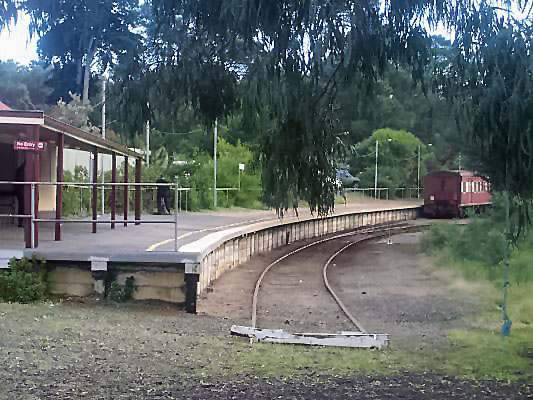
Northbound view of station platform,
January 2006

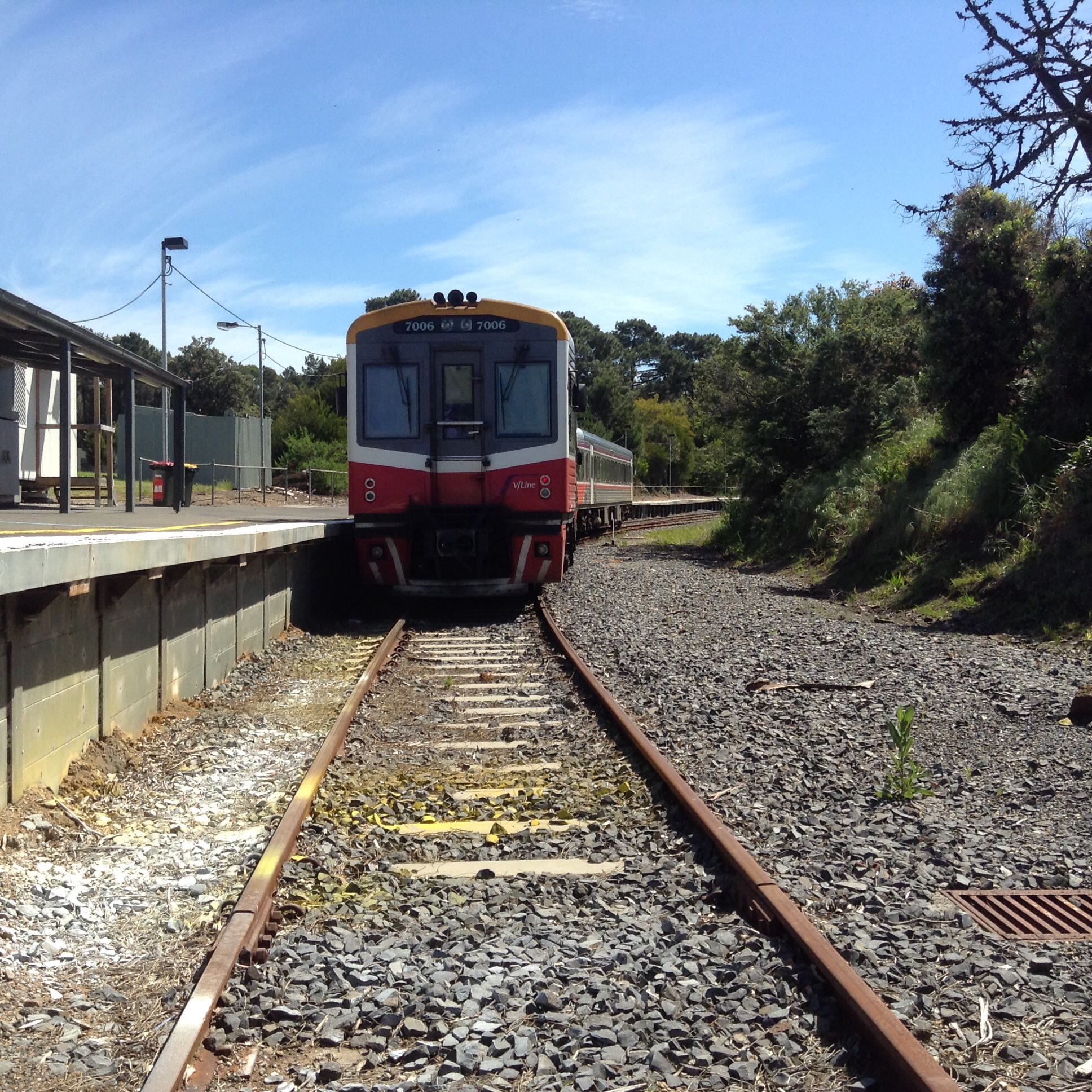
V/Line Sprinter 7006 occupies the station platform, October 2013

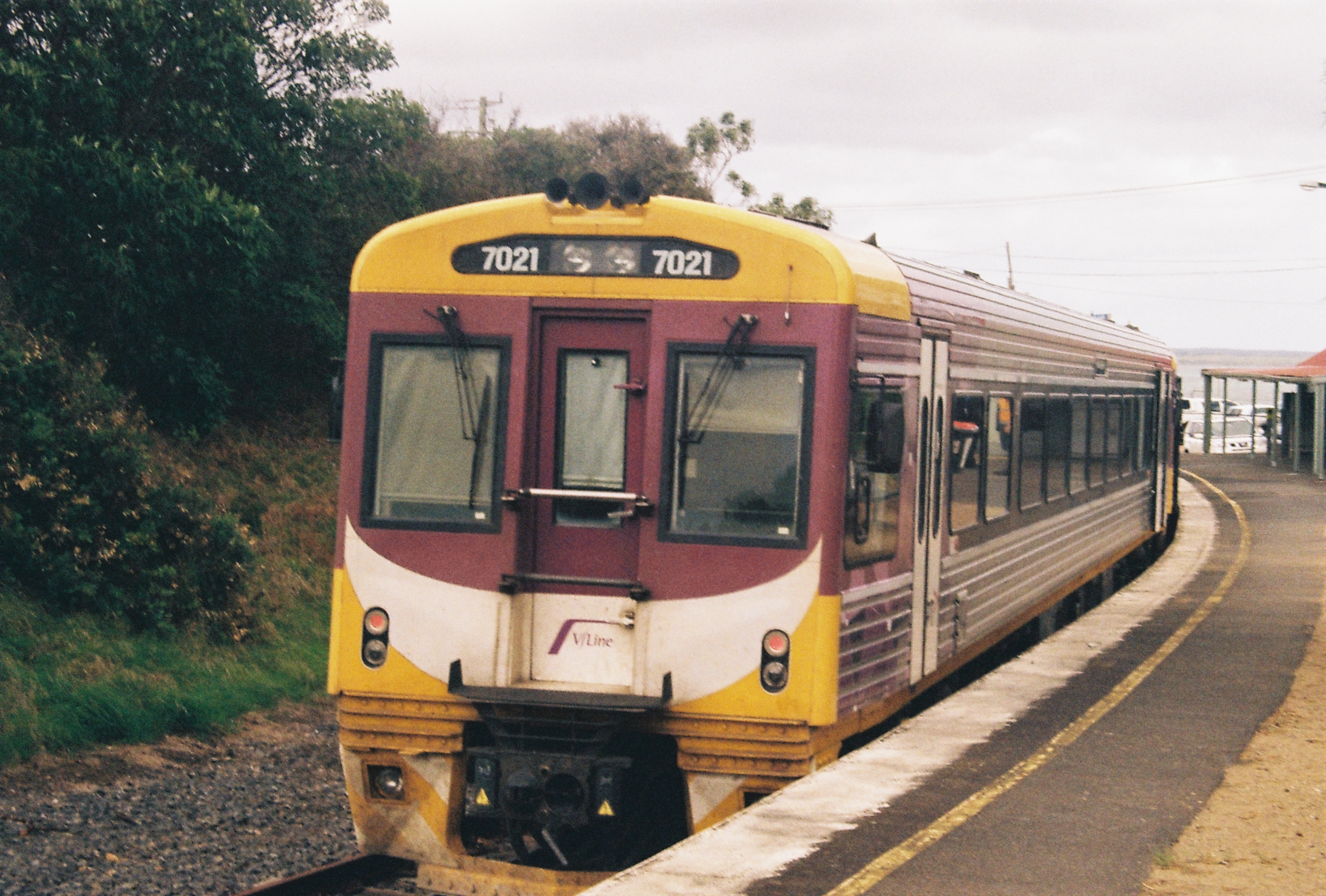
South bound view

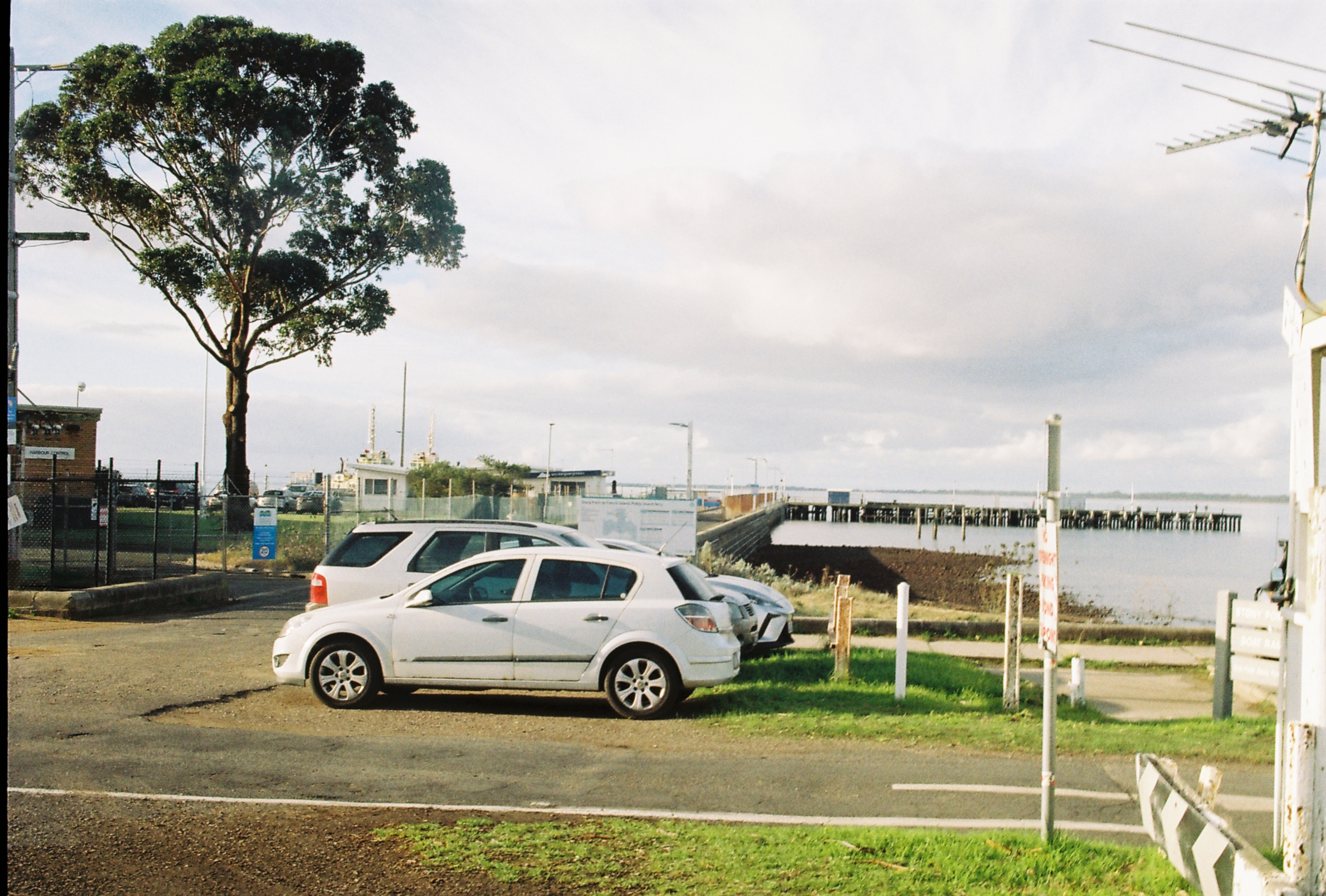
Pier at Stony Point near the station

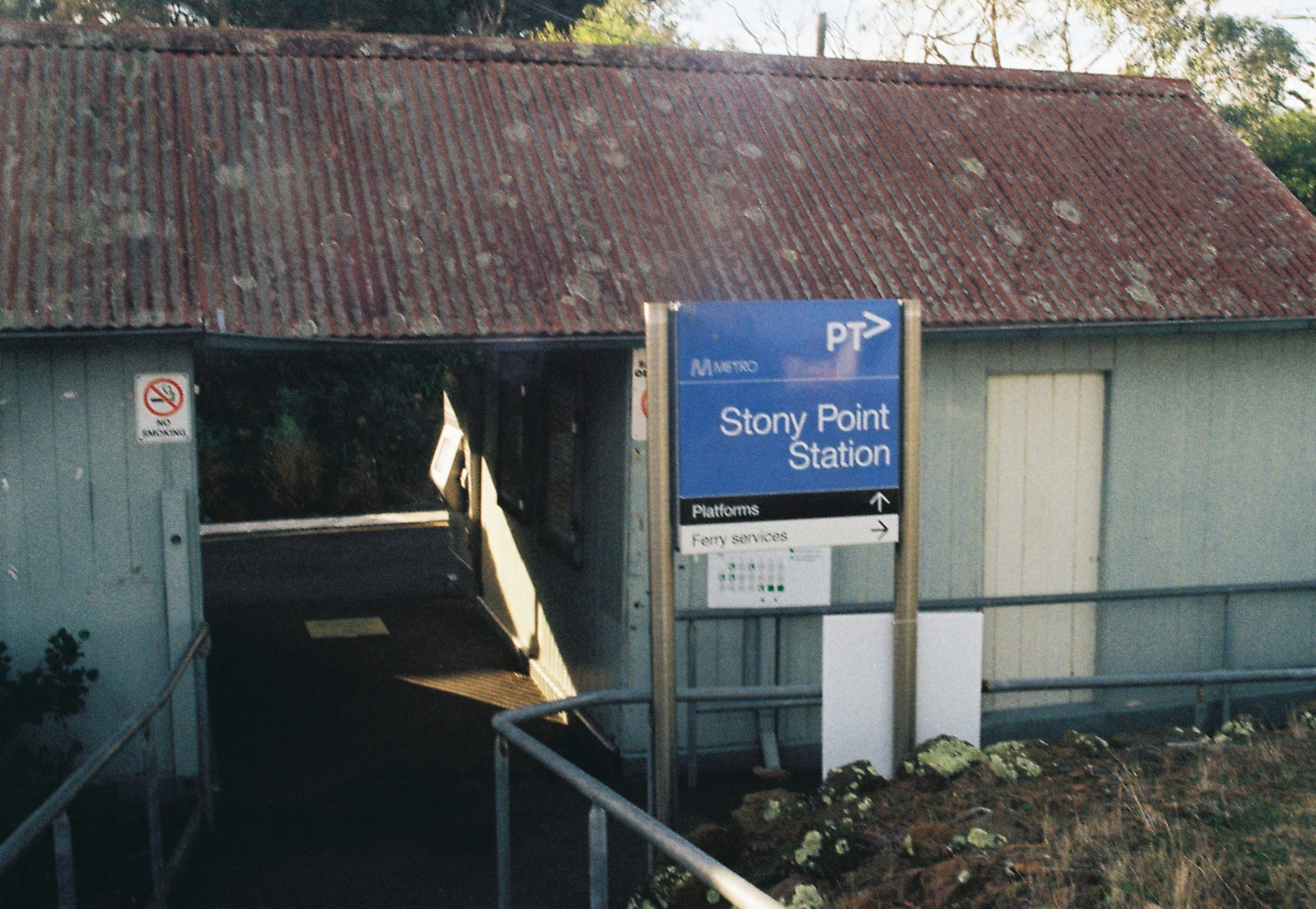
Station entrance in 2025

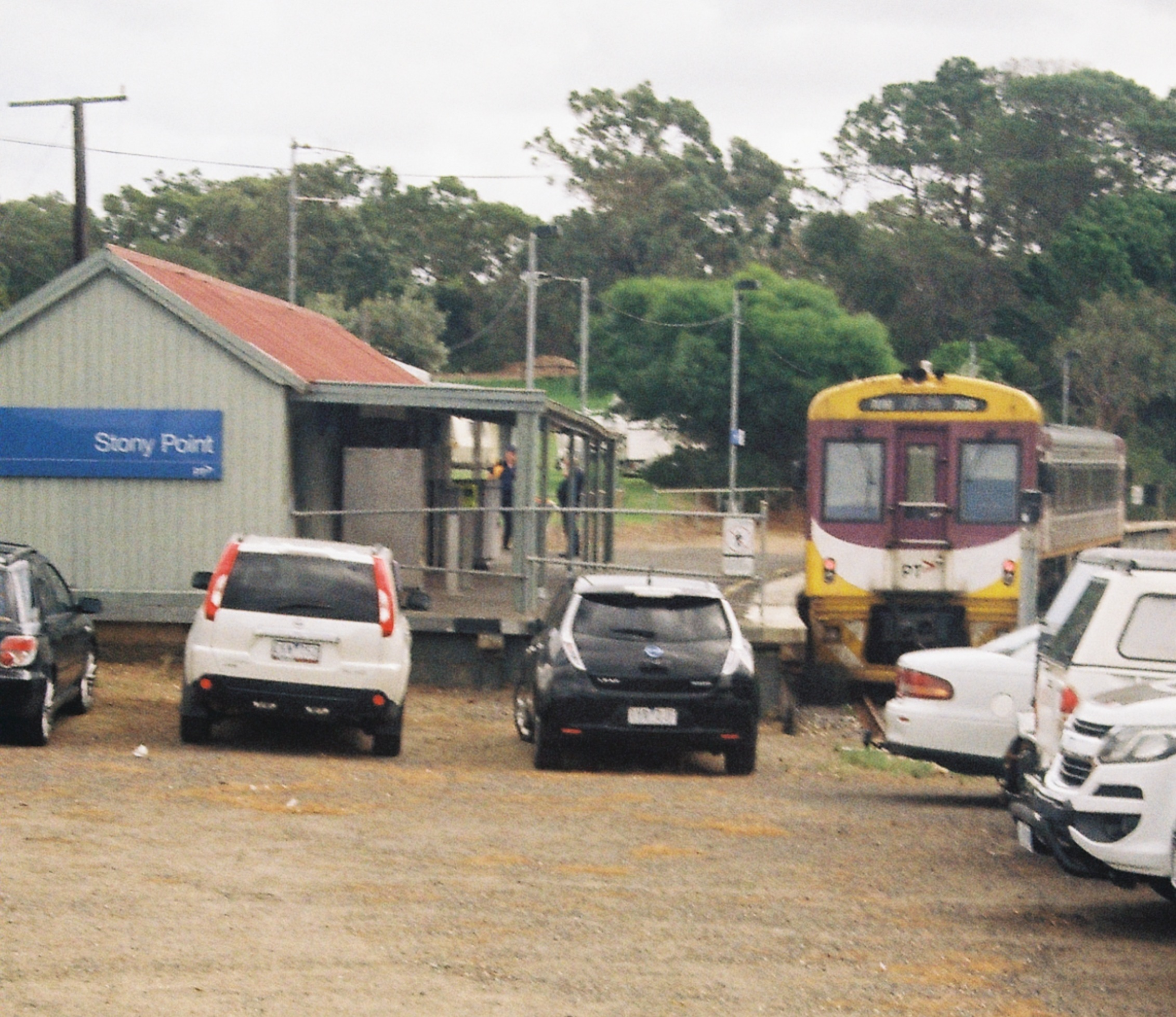
Station car park
