= Victorian Railways E type carriage =

Class of passenger railway car in Australia

E Type Carriage
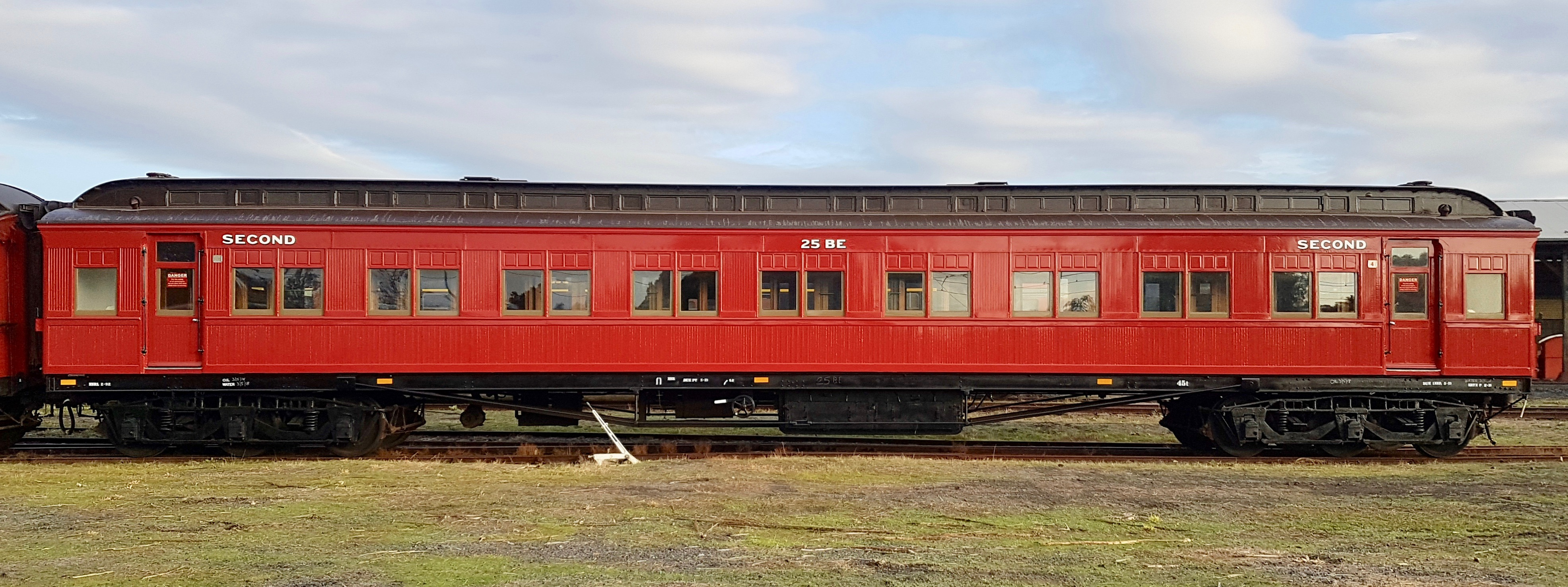
- E type carriage 25BE restored by Steamrail Victoria in 2018

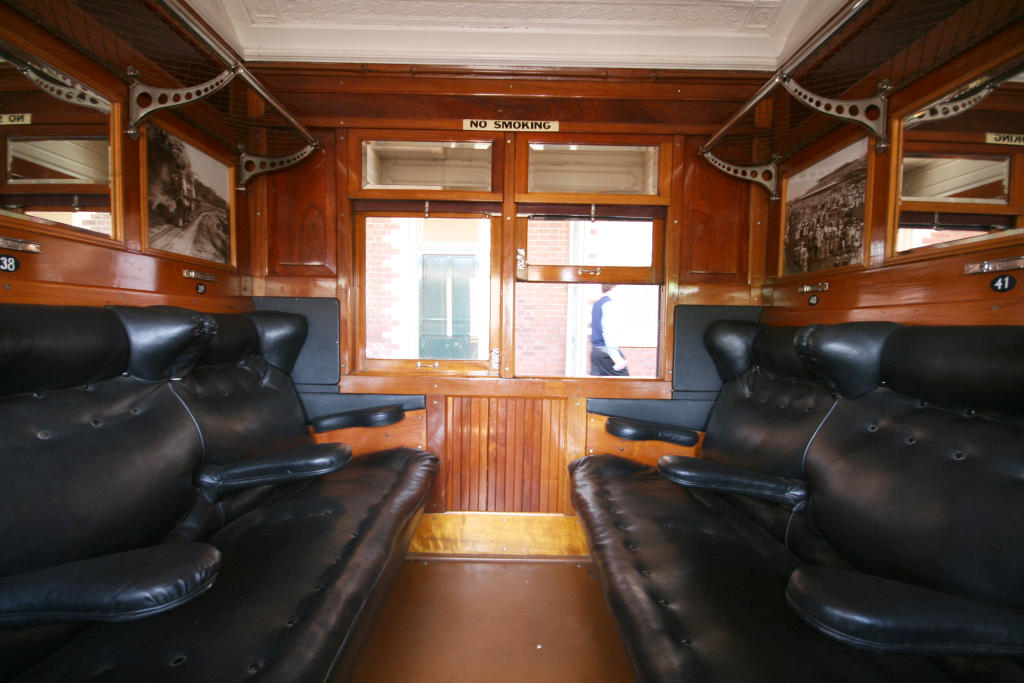
- Interior of a restored AE coded first class carriage
- Manufacturers: Victorian Railways, South Australian Railways
- Assembly: Melbourne, Australia and Adelaide, South Australia
- Built at: Newport Workshops, Islington Railway Workshops
- Operator: various heritage operators

Specifications
- Car body construction: Timber
- Car length: 71 ft 0 in (21.64 m) over body; 74 ft 1 1/4 in (22.59 m) over pulling lines; 73 ft 8 1/4 in (22.46 m) when coupled
- Width: 9 ft 6 in (2.90 m)
- Height: 13 ft 8 1/4 in (4.17 m)
- Doors: 4 swing doors at corners
- Maximum speed: 70 mph (113 km/h) in service; 50 mph (80 km/h) in preservation
- Power supply: Axle-mounted generators
- HVAC: Some cars fitted with Stone's Air Conditioning units.
- Bogies: 53 ft 10 in (16.41 m) centres; 10 ft (3.05 m) wheelbase each; 63 ft 10 in (19.46 m) total wheelbase 8 ft 9 in (2.67 m) wheelbase each; 61 ft 10 in (18.85 m) total wheelbase
- Braking system: Westinghouse air brakes
- Coupling system: Screw couplers, later automatic couplers
- Seating: Compartments
- Track gauge: 5 ft 3 in (1,600 mm)

Notes/references
- This table is the generic layout; tables further down the page cover specific sub-types

The E type carriages were wooden express passenger carriages used on the railways of Victoria, Australia. Originally introduced by Victorian Railways Chairman of Commissioners Thomas James Tait for the interstate service between Melbourne, Sydney and Adelaide, these Canadian-inspired carriages remained in regular service for 85 years over the entire Victorian network.

== Design ==
Carriages on Victorian long-distance express services at the start of the 20th century were, in comparison to the Pullman cars operated by the New South Wales Government Railways, relatively cramped and austere. Chairman of Commissioners Thomas Tait, previously the Transportation Manager of the Canadian Pacific Railway, introduced a carriage design that was 71 feet (21.64 m) long, and as wide as the loading gauge allowed. Much of their external appearance was based on typical Canadian carriage design, with a clerestory roof curved at the ends, doors only at the ends of the car, and six-wheel bogies, although their interior design retained the compartment & corridor layout typical of English railway practice. Tait was the Chairman of Commissioners from 4 May 1903 to 30 November 1910, but it is not known how involved he was personally with the design of the carriages.

The cars were built over a steel truss underframe, with wooden bodies constructed in cedar, six-wheeled bogies with eight brake blocks each (two to the outside of the outer wheels, two each per centre wheel), and clerestory roofs to give ventilation as well as daytime lighting. Night-time lighting was initially provided with Pintsch gas. Separate drop-toilets for males and females were provided in all passenger vehicles except the dining cars, along with staff toilets in the twelve mail vans.

About three decades into their lives, 15 first-class carriages had air-conditioning added, the first (36AE) being out-shopped in December 1935. The Victorian Railways claimed it was the first such car in the British Empire, but the Canadian Pacific and the New South Wales Government Railways already had air-conditioned carriages.

== Construction ==
Four and six wheeled bogies as used under the cars.

Of the joint stock carriages, the first class and sleeping carriages were constructed at Newport Workshops by the Victorian Railways; the second class carriages and most of the vans were constructed by the South Australian Railways' Islington Railway Workshops. Later carriages of the E design were constructed at Newport Workshops, either by the Victorian Railways employees directly or by Butty Gangs, who were contracted to build carriages within the workshops complex. Butty gangs had been used around the state on various projects; for example when discussing in Parliament the construction of the narrow-gauge railway from Moe to Walhalla around 1900, consideration was given to setting an average daily wage per worker on the project of £0/6/0; this was changed to the minimum figure instead, and later still to a minimum figure of £0/7/0.

The first batch of E-class carriages were built between 1906 and 1911, with 38 AVE 1st class cars, 16 ABVE 1st/2nd composite cars, 39 BVE 2nd class cars, 25 DVE guard's vans, 10 ESBV, 2 EES, and 2 EEB mail vans, 6 Sleeping cars, and 2 Parlor cars; a State Car was built in 1912, having a similar design to that of the Parlor cars. The DVE, EEB, and EES classes were 60.16 feet (18.34 m) long, the remainder 71 feet (21.64 m). All had wooden bodies, clerestory roofs and six-wheel bogies. On his website, Peter J. Vincent notes that he suspects the 'E' classification referred to 'Express'.

All cars were re-coded in 1910, without being renumbered: AVE to AE, ABVE to ABE, BVE to BE, DVE to CE, EEB to D, EES to DS, and ESBV to BDSE. All the BDSE cars were later converted to BE and BCE cars. In addition to the original 144 carriages, a further 31 were built from 1919 onwards, however, three of these were replacements so the total in service never exceeded 172 at any one time.

=== Maintenance of Joint Stock fleet ===
Notably, the Joint Stock series of carriages, primarily built for and used on The Overland, were owned by both the Victorian and South Australian railways so each side kept their own records, which did not always match. For instance, the build dates for the 1923 BE cars (numbers 40-43) diverge. The hypothesis proposed by Parsons was that the Victorian Railways' records were the dates that the cars first arrived in Melbourne, rather than their entry to service. While the 1885 agreement between the Victorian and South Australian railways for joint stock fleet maintenance originally specified three-year terms, by 1934 this had been altered to five-year terms. Therefore, the Victorian Railways took the period 1934-1939, then the South Australian Railways to 1944, and so on until 1959. This explains the VR being responsible for automatic coupler conversion in the mid-late 1930s, and the SAR had influence over liveries until 1949, when an agreement was reached that new steel carriages for the Overland would be painted red.

Parsons highlights in particular that 7BE, 3CE, 1D and 4D were red in the late 1940s, and 26CE from 1949, but 3D was red in 1944 then black in 1945, and 1D was black in 1942/43, but red in 1946; and that the Victorian Railways had no other use for dark green paint at the time, while the South Australian Railways continued to use green paint on their rolling stock, e.g. the Centenary cars, through to their retirement. Where the Victorian Railways initially used a crimson red and later tomato red, the South Australian Railways' shade of red was a "regal red" which, when applied to wooden carriage bodies, gave a distinct brown tinge, with 27CE being a noted candidate for this scheme. South Australia also tried short-lived a polyurethane paint formulation which ended up with a purple hue.

== Details ==
=== First Class sitting cars ===
First Class sitting cars
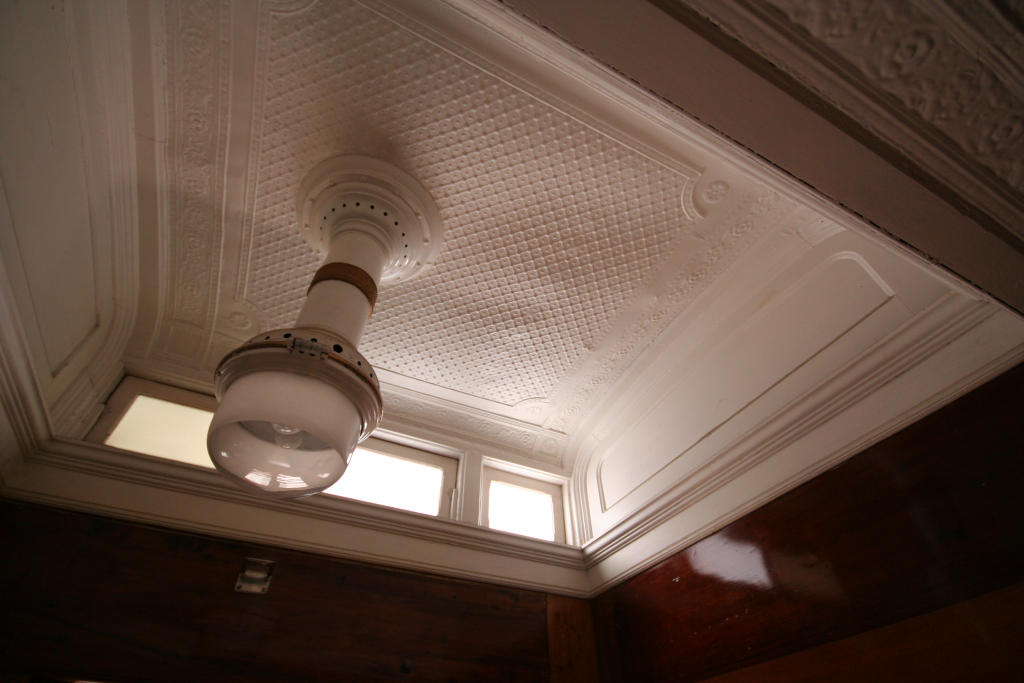
- Roof detail inside a compartment of a similar W type carriage
- Constructed: 1906–1923
- Entered service: 1906
- Retired: 1992
- Number built: 42
- Number preserved: 5 (1, 2, 12, 18 & 30)
- Number scrapped: 37
- Design code: AVE, AE
- Fleet numbers: 1 to 16AVE; 1 to 42AE; 51 & 52AE
- Capacity: 48 1st class passengers

Specifications
- Weight: 34 LT 19 cwt 0 qtr (35.51 t) (non-airconditioned)
- Axle load: 8 LT 14 cwt 3 qtr (8.88 t) (non-airconditioned)
- Track gauge: OWB144 in preservation only: 3 ft 6 in (1,067 mm)

These carriages were built from 1906 with eight compartments, each seating 6 first-class passengers for a total of 48 along with a lavatory/wash basin arrangement at either end of each carriage. In the first four carriages, two compartments at the Gentlemen's end were reserved for Smoking travellers, while another two compartments adjacent to the Ladies lavatory were reserved for ladies only; this was later reduced to one Ladies compartment, with the Non-Smoking compartment count increased from four to five.

26 cars were built and numbered 1AV^{E} to 26AV^{E}. In the 1910 re-coding the class was re-lettered to AE, with the original numbers retained. Construction continued with a further twelve cars released to traffic until 1910 (Nos. 27 to 38), and a final four cars added in 1923 (Nos. 39 to 42). Cars 5 to 10, & 39 to 42 were in Joint Stock service (shared) between Adelaide and Melbourne, on trains such as the Overland. Although all construction was at Newport, only around 25 of the carriages were constructed by the Victorian Railways; the remainder (spread fairly randomly throughout the class) were constructed at least partially by contractors in the Newport area.

Car 36AE was notable as this car was the prototype car for air conditioning carriages in VR service, the test for the "Spirit of Progress" cars. 36AE entered service 13 December 1935, after air conditioning modifications, which took seven months to complete. In 1961, it was renumbered 49BE. The car was destroyed in a derailment at Laverton during 1978.

Some cars were leased to the South Australian Railways following World War II; as of 1950 they included 4AE, 11AE, 13AE, & 14AE. In 1952 cars 7 & 8AE were sold to the South Australian Railways to become their 550 & 551. The cars were later forwarded to the Commonwealth Railways, with 550 being written off in 1993, and 551 (after other incarnations) preserved by the Ghan Preservation Society in Alice Springs. 9AE was also leased to the SAR for a period in February 1954.

Cars 15AE, later replaced by 38AE and finally 5G were coupled between two electric swing door motor cars or parcels vans, to run around the entire suburban system while fitted with Hallade track recording equipment. The consist with an AE car was sighted on the Port Melbourne and St Kilda lines in 1952, and 2CM-38AE-1CM was seen on 4 December 1955, in that case with the leading CM powered and the trailing CM dead-attached with the pantograph lowered.

In the early 1960s, some AE cars had their bogies switched with those formerly under the Spirit of Progress carriages, as those cars were converted to standard gauge. However, while the bogie frames were transferred, it is thought that the AE cars may have retained their spoked wheelsets(?). Around the same time, AE 36, 1, 3, & 12 were re-coded as BE cars 49 to 52, with their seats removed and replaced for eight per compartment, total 64. 50BE stayed in that form, though the latter two cars were converted back to AE classification in the early 1980s as numbers 51 & 52.

In 1970 car 37AE was taken off register, but in 1971 it was converted to the second HW 1 as a crew car for the Weedex train. In this form it ran around Victorian lines, while the train sprayed weed-killer onto the tracks. It was used in this form from 1971 to 1995.

1AE (still coded 50BES), 2AE, 18AE, 30AE, & 1BG are in the custodianship of the Seymour Railway Heritage Centre, along with the frame of 39AE. 12AE is currently in the care of Steamrail Victoria, and 1HW ex 37AE is stored under their care, unserviceable, in Newport Workshops East Block yard. 18AE was with the Victorian Goldfields Railway, but it was purchased by Seymour Railway Heritage Centre and moved by rail to Seymour for restoration in late 2010. The body of 24AE was donated to a community farm in Brunswick East, and is reportedly used as an administration office. It can also be hired as an event venue, and has been redeveloped to have two separate hireable compartments and be more accessible. Coordinates are 37°45'57.8"S, 144°59'03.7"E.

28AE's body was sold privately and spent some time in Warrnambool before being moved to Codrington.

==== Buffet & Restaurant cars ====
Buffet Car, later Taggerty; Kiewa, Moyne, 1 & 2 BG
- Constructed: 1937
- Entered service: 1937
- Retired: 1992
- Number built: 3
- Number preserved: 2
- Capacity: 18 1st class passengers & 18 buffet stools (Taggerty); 62 sitting passengers (1 and 2BG)

Specifications
- Weight: Taggerty: 50 LT 4 cwt 0 qtr (51.01 t); Kiewa & Moyne: 46 LT 12 cwt 0 qtr (47.35 t)
- Axle load: Taggerty: 12 LT 11 cwt 0 qtr (12.75 t); Kiewa & Moyne: 11 LT 13 cwt 0 qtr (11.84 t)

34AE was converted to a buffet car in 1937 and named Taggerty two years later. In this form a kitchen and long counter facing eighteen seats filled most of the carriage, with three first-class compartments seating the same number of passengers in the rest of the carriage. Taggerty ran in VR long-distance services, most often on the 12 noon Melbourne to Bendigo, returning on the 5:04 pm.

It originally retained the dark red scheme of the Victorian Railways' passenger fleet (though with a silver roof), but by March 1963 it had been repainted into the blue and gold scheme. The vehicle was sold in 1983 and it now resides in a park in Donald.

21AE & 26AE were intended to follow Taggerty, but this work was held off during World War II. As work had already started the vehicles could not be pressed back into service, so they spent the war in the Newport Workshops compound. In 1955 the cars were finally finished, re-entering service as air-conditioned Restaurant cars: three compartments were retained but the rest of the car stripped out, being replaced with a buffet module with an eating area. The cars were named Kiewa and Moyne respectively. A John Buckland photo of Moyne in 1958 at Dimboola shows that it was fitted with ex-Spirit of Progress bogies.

It is possible that, had Kiewa and Moyne entered service in 1939, they would have been identified as Composite Buffet No.6 and No.7 respectively.

==== Partial-Saloon cars ====
In 1959 the restaurant cars Kiewa and Moyne were withdrawn as a failed experiment. They had their eating areas removed, being replaced with saloon-style seating, before re-entering service in 1961. The cars were listed in the Working Time Table as second-class vehicles sitting 64 (though two of those seats were unreserved adjacent to the men's lavatory), as the compartment seats had been replaced with four-across, eight per compartment. The result was three sets of eight seats in the compartment end, with the remaining 38 seats in a saloon format as 2+2, either side of a 2 ft 1 in (0.64 m) hallway. The saloon area was designated a smoking area, while the compartments were restricted to non-smoking passengers. The compartment walls that had previously supported the car roof were replaced in function by four columns along the saloon section. The 'G' in the code may have indicated Grampians, a Victorian mountain range the cars would often run past, though by the mid 1970s 1BG was exclusively allocated to services on the Yarram line. Later it was used as a radio test vehicle; it is now stored, awaiting restoration.

2BG was destroyed in a Glenorchy level crossing smash, in 1971.

=== Composite First & Second Class sitting cars ===
Composite sitting cars
- Constructed: 1906–1910
- Entered service: 1906
- Number built: 16
- Number preserved: 6 (3, 5, 7, 10, 11 & 16)
- Number scrapped: 10
- Design code: ABVE, ABE
- Fleet numbers: 1 to 10ABVE & 1 to 16ABE
- Capacity: 25 1st class & 33 2nd class passengers

Specifications
- Weight: 43 LT 6 cwt 0 qtr (43.99 t)
- Axle load: 10 LT 16 cwt 2 qtr (11.00 t)

10 cars were built between 1906 and 1909 at or near Newport Workshops, classed ABVE. The cars seated 23 first and 31 second class passengers in eight compartments. One Smoking compartment was located at each end of the carriage, adjacent to the two male lavatories, and two Ladies' compartments were in the middle, each connected directly to a centrally located Ladies lavatory (one of each class). As in the AVE and BVE cars, Ladies accessed their respective toilets from within each compartment, one seat having been omitted in lieu. Additionally, each car had a two-seat bench opposite the male toilets at each end, giving a total seating capacity of 58 passengers. In the 1910 re-coding the cars were re-lettered to ABE with original numbers retained; around this time a further 6 were built to the same design as numbers 11 to 16.

Nine of the cars were re-coded to BES in about 1960 (indicating slightly lesser capacity than a normal BE car), with a further four of the class scrapped between 1970 and 1982.

5ABE & 16ABE are preserved at Seymour Railway Heritage Centre while 3ABE & 7ABE are currently under the care of Steamrail Victoria. 12ABE was also under Steamrail's care, but everything above the frame was scrapped in 2008 after deteriorating markedly.

In preservation, 7ABE was fitted with a small kiosk at the Second Class end of the carriage and is used to sell souvenirs on trips. 5ABE has also been fitted with a kiosk in preservation towards the center of the carriage.

=== Second Class sitting cars ===
Second Class sitting cars
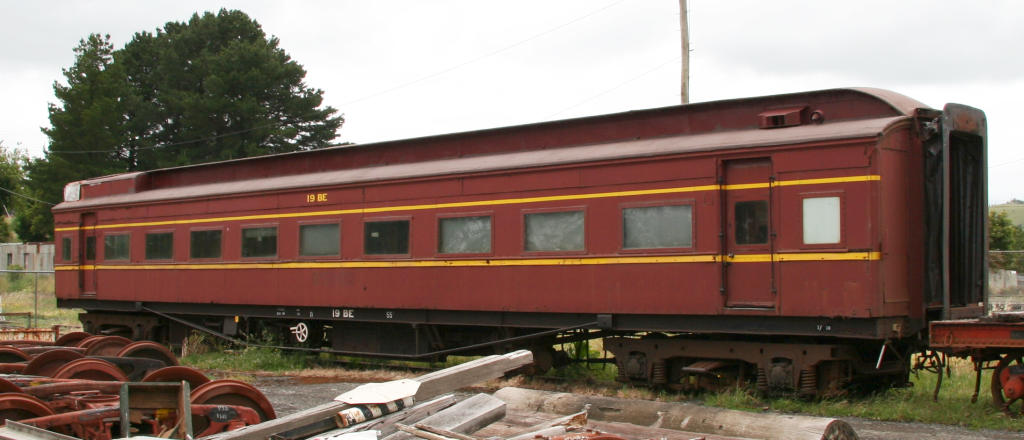
- Air conditioned 19BE as preserved by the former South Gippsland Railway; this vehicle has since been scrapped.

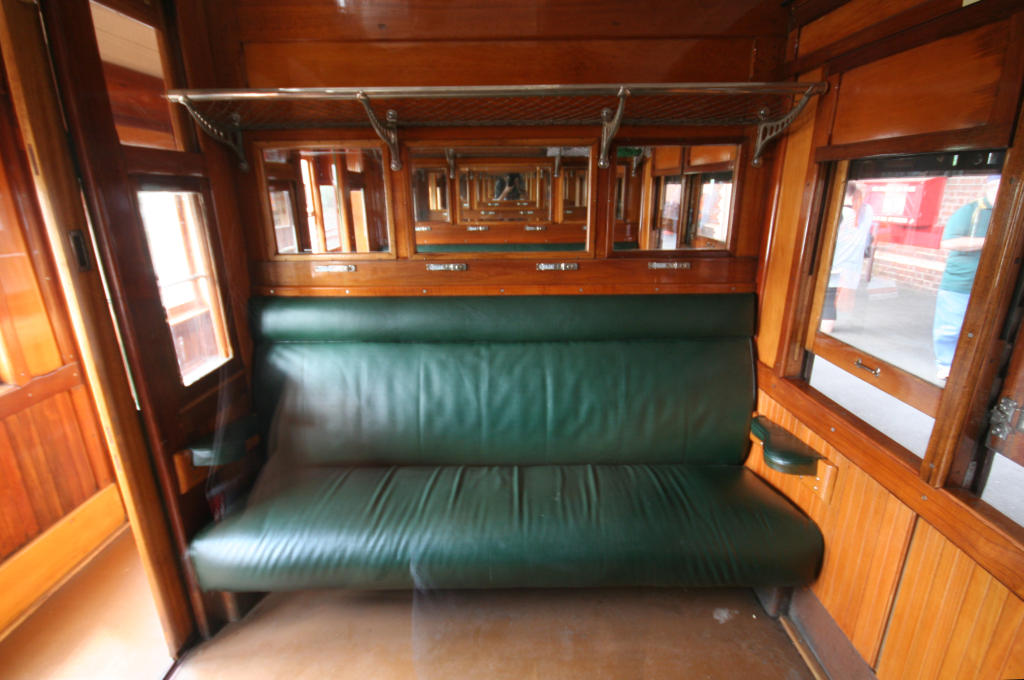
- Interior of a second class BE coded carriage
- Constructed: 1906–1923
- Entered service: 1906
- Number built: 43
- Number preserved: 22 (1, 2, 3, 4, 14, 15, 16, 17, 18, 19, 20, 24, 25, 26, 29, 30, 31, 33, 34, 36, 38, 42)
- Number scrapped: 18
- Design code: BVE, BE, BES, BEL
- Fleet numbers: 1 to 31BVE, 1 to 43BE, later 44 to 48BE(L), 49 to 52BE, 53 to 61BE(S)
- Capacity: 72 2nd class passengers (76 for BEL; 64 for BES).

Specifications
- Weight: 41 LT 10 cwt 0 qtr (42.17 t) (non-airconditioned); 44 LT 10 cwt 0 qtr (45.21 t) (airconditioned)
- Axle load: 10 LT 7 cwt 2 qtr (10.54 t) (non-airconditioned); 11 LT 2 cwt 2 qtr (11.30 t) (airconditioned)
- Bogies: 43BE post-rebuild 51 ft 10 in (15.80 m) centres

These carriages were built from 1906 with nine compartments, each seating 8 second-class passengers for a total of 72 along with a lavatory/wash basin arrangement at either end of each carriage. Like the AVE cars, the first four cars had two compartments at the Gentlemen's end were reserved for Smoking travelers, while another two compartments adjacent to the Ladies lavatory were reserved for ladies only; this was later reduced to one Ladies compartment, with the Non-Smoking compartment count increased from five to six. BVE cars numbered 5 and higher began their lives with two Smoking, 6 Non-Smoking, and 1 Ladies compartment each.

39 cars of this class were built initially; the majority were numbered 1BV^{E} to 31BV^{E}, although construction continued with cars 32 to 39 being released after the 1910 re-coding, so they started life as BE cars with the remainder of the class re-coded to join them. In 1923 a further four cars, 40BE to 43BE, were built to supplement 5BE to 10BE in the joint-stock arrangement.

The Joint Stock cars were built at the South Australian Railways' Islington Railway Workshops; the other 33 carriages were built at Newport, although about two-thirds of those were constructed by local contractors rather than Railway workers.

9BE & 43BE were involved in the 1929 derailment at Callington, SA. 9BE was destroyed, but 43BE was rebuilt with a new underframe and bogies spaced at 51 ft 10 in (15.80 m) rather than the class standard of 53 ft 10 in (16.41 m). The new underframe had been fitted by 3 August 1931 at Islington, and the car was also fitted with external South Australian Railways drop-handle handbrake equipment on one of the corners, matching the style of van 1D.

At some point, 42BE was fitted with steel sheeting over the timber sides in an attempt to preserve them.

Cars 44 to 48BE were converted from BDSE mail sorting cars between 1922 and 1929 (see details below). Cars 49, 50, 51, & 52BE were former first class air-conditioned cars, re-classed when new steel carriages were introduced. 53BE to 61BE were converted from composite ABE cars during 1981, as the start of the transition from wooden stock to all steel cars and altered rostering of carriages into small fixed sets.

8BE was scrapped on 11 April 1958 following a side-swipe at Mount Barker in the early morning of 1 January 1958. The carriage was running in a train from Victor Harbor to Adelaide, hauled by engine 525, when it collided with the second division of the Adelaide to Melbourne Overland service.

To overcome problems with different seating capacities within the BE group, two suffixes were added to the class in 1982. Using the standard BE capacity of 72 passengers, cars with a greater capacity (76 passengers) were coded BE^{L} and cars with less capacity (64 passengers) were coded BE^{S}. Cars listed as BE^{L} were 44 to 47, while 50, 53, 55 to 61BE were re-classed to BE^{S}, same numbers, during 1982; it is likely that cars 52 & 54 were also re-lettered but records have not been found to confirm this. All these cars were withdrawn during 1983/1984 thanks to the introduction of the N sets.

One BE underframe was retained by the South Australian Railways for workshops use; the bogies and frame, including floor, were used to transfer heavy beams around the workshops until the late 1980s.

1BE, 14BE, 26BE, & 33BE are currently preserved at Seymour Railway Heritage Centre, 4BE, 17BE, 25BE, & 38BE along with 46BE (ex BDSE) are currently preserved with Steamrail Victoria while 2BE, 3BE, 29BE, & 30BE are stored; 15BE & 20BE were with the Victorian Goldfields Railway but were sold to Seymour Railway Heritage Centre and moved by rail to Seymour for restoration in late 2010. 19BE, 34BE, & 36BE were allocated to the South Gippsland Railway, and 42BE (constructed at Islington Railway Workshops, South Australia) is preserved at the National Railway Museum at Port Adelaide. 45BE (ex BDSE) has been named Hastings and is currently at Moorooduc on the Mornington Tourist Railway, along with 57BE & 58BE both ex ABE. 47BE (ex BDSE) is privately owned and at Seymour.

=== Guard's Vans ===
DVE, later CE vans & 1VHE
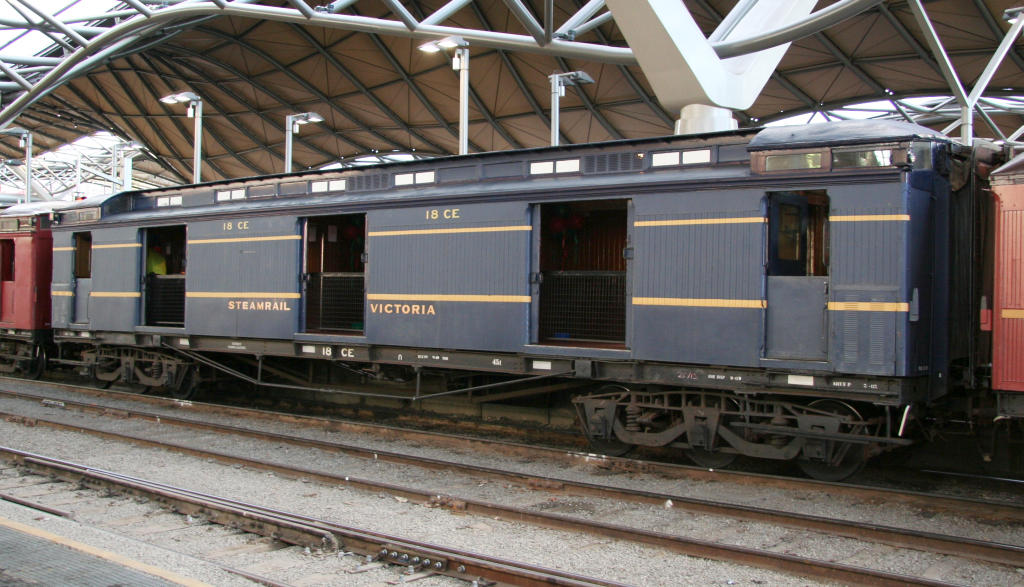
- Clerestory roofed 18CE as preserved by Steamrail Victoria
- Constructed: 1906–1930
- Entered service: 1906
- Retired: 1984
- Number built: 37
- Number preserved: 5 (5, 13, 18, 19 & 31)
- Number scrapped: 32
- Design code: DVE, CE, VHE
- Fleet numbers: 1 to 16DVE; 1 to 37CE & 1VHE
- Capacity: 12 LT 0 cwt 0 qtr (12.19 t) (1DVE-16DVE, 1CE-27CE) 20 LT 0 cwt 0 qtr (20.32 t) (15CE rebuilt & 33CE-37CE)

Specifications
- Car length: 60 ft 2 in (18.34 m) over body; 63 ft 3 1/4 in (19.28 m) over pulling lines
- Height: 13 ft 8 5/8 in (4.18 m)
- Weight: 34 LT 10 cwt 0 qtr (35.05 t) unloaded
- Axle load: 8 LT 12 cwt 2 qtr (8.76 t) unloaded
- Bogies: E type at 43 ft 0 in (13.11 m) centres
- Track gauge: 1VHE only: 4 ft 8 1/2 in (1,435 mm) standard gauge

From 1906, construction of the DVE vans started. At 60 ft 2 in (18.34 m) long, the vans were used for small amounts of freight (in some cases built with or modified to include meat, fish, or coffin areas), and incorporated guards cupolas over dog-boxes at each end of the carriages. Vans 1 & 2 were built at Newport, 3 to 6 at Islington. Originally this meant two fish-fitted vans were available for the Adelaide run and another two for the Albury run, but shortly after those services began the Newport pair were swapped for 5 and 6DVE, so that the Joint Stock (fish-fitted) series was 1 to 4; and these four were then used exclusively on Adelaide services. Construction continued at Newport until 1910, when the 17th van was classed CE, the previous 16 DVE vans being re-classed to same, through to 25CE the following year. It is not known where the fish traffic originated from, but Banger and Medlin hypothesised that it may have been caught on the Murray River and loaded at Murray Bridge and Tailem Bend for the Adelaide and Melbourne markets, or from the Adelaide area for the Melbourne Fish Markets (which were not far from Spencer Street station until 1959). This hypothesis is supported by Parsons, who further noted the smell of fish emanating from the train before departure from Adelaide. The fish traffic is believed to have continued through the mid 1960s, as the CD vans being built at the time were similarly fitted with fish compartments.

The first 25 DVE/CE vans were split into three subtypes. Vans 1 to 4 had two outer guards' compartments 7 ft 3 3/8 in (2.22 m) long, two outer baggage compartments of 15 ft 8 1/4 in (4.78 m) long, with a central fish compartment of 13 feet (3.96 m). Van 5 was similar, although the central compartment was switched to regular traffic instead of fish, and expanded to 14 ft 8 in (4.47 m) long with the outer two compartments reduced to 14 ft 8 1/4 in (4.48 m) in length. Vans 7 to 25 were altered further, with the guards' compartments reduced to 5 ft 6 1/2 in (1.69 m) wide; this was done so that the three central compartments could be expanded, with the outer two reaching 15 ft 11 1/2 in (4.86 m) across, while the centre one was 15 ft 9 1/4 in (4.81 m). Sources differ on whether van 6DVE had the original 13 feet (3.96 m) or later 5 ft 6 1/2 in (1.69 m) length guard compartments at each end, but an early photo of 6DVE shows it had the same pattern of windows in its clerestory roof as the earlier vans, rather than the later type, so it most likely had the original longer guard compartments at least initially.

The fleet was further expanded from 1923, with vans 26 to 32 built to the same design (numbers 26 & 27 were added to the Joint Stock fleet), as well as vans 33 to 37 built with an arched roof similar to the then-new W type carriage design, which were also fitted with four-wheel (two-axle), rather than six-wheel (three-axle) bogies.

Between 1926 and 1928, vans 11 to 14 had one of their guards' compartments removed at one end to make way for two transversely mounted coffin chambers. The end door was sealed as a result, although the vestibule connection remained.

In 1930, a collision at Seymour wrecked 15CE. A new van, also numbered 15CE, was built to the style of CE 33 to 37 instead of as the original 15CE.

From 1936 the Joint Stock carriages were being repainted in a green, black, and yellow scheme, but this program had to be cut short account the world war. Carriages were spotted in bright red from 1943, including 3CE & 26CE in the late 1940s.

The 1936 General Appendix specifies that CE type brake vans were absolutely banned from the Healesville line, but it does not specify why.

In 1963 35CE was modified for standard gauge service. It was reclassed to 1VHE: (V) Victoria; (H) (NSW guards van code); (E) (E-car van), although in 1969 the van was restored to its former identity and gauge.

From the late 1970s vans 35CE, 36CE and 37CE were specifically rostered on the Vinelander service to Mildura, and at least two of them had stencils on the underframe sides indicating that rostering. By 1980 35CE and 37CE had been fitted with a desk in lieu of the raised observation seats at the canopy ends. However, in January 1980 the service was worked alternately between 10CE and 37CE.

33CE was the only wooden vehicle to be painted in the VicRail orange 'Teacup' livery.

18CE, owned by Victrack, is currently serviceable thanks to the efforts of Steamrail Victoria. 31CE, also owned by Victrack, is currently under restoration by the Victorian Goldfields Railway. It is thought that both 13CE & 19CE were originally leased to Steamrail, but no record of either van has been seen since.

5CE is preserved in Bright at a museum at the former railway station, one of only two South Australian Railways-built E cars to survive. The bodies of 7 & 16CE were noted at Drouin, 8CE at Narre Warren North, 10 & 21CE at Officer, The body of 11CE at Cassilis, 20CE at Hanging Rock, 23CE at Beaconsfield, 24CE at Warrnambool, 30CE near Neilborough, 33CE at Gembrook, and 36CE at Yea.

=== Composite Second (sitting), Guard and Mail Sorting cars ===
Second Class sitting, Guard & Mail cars
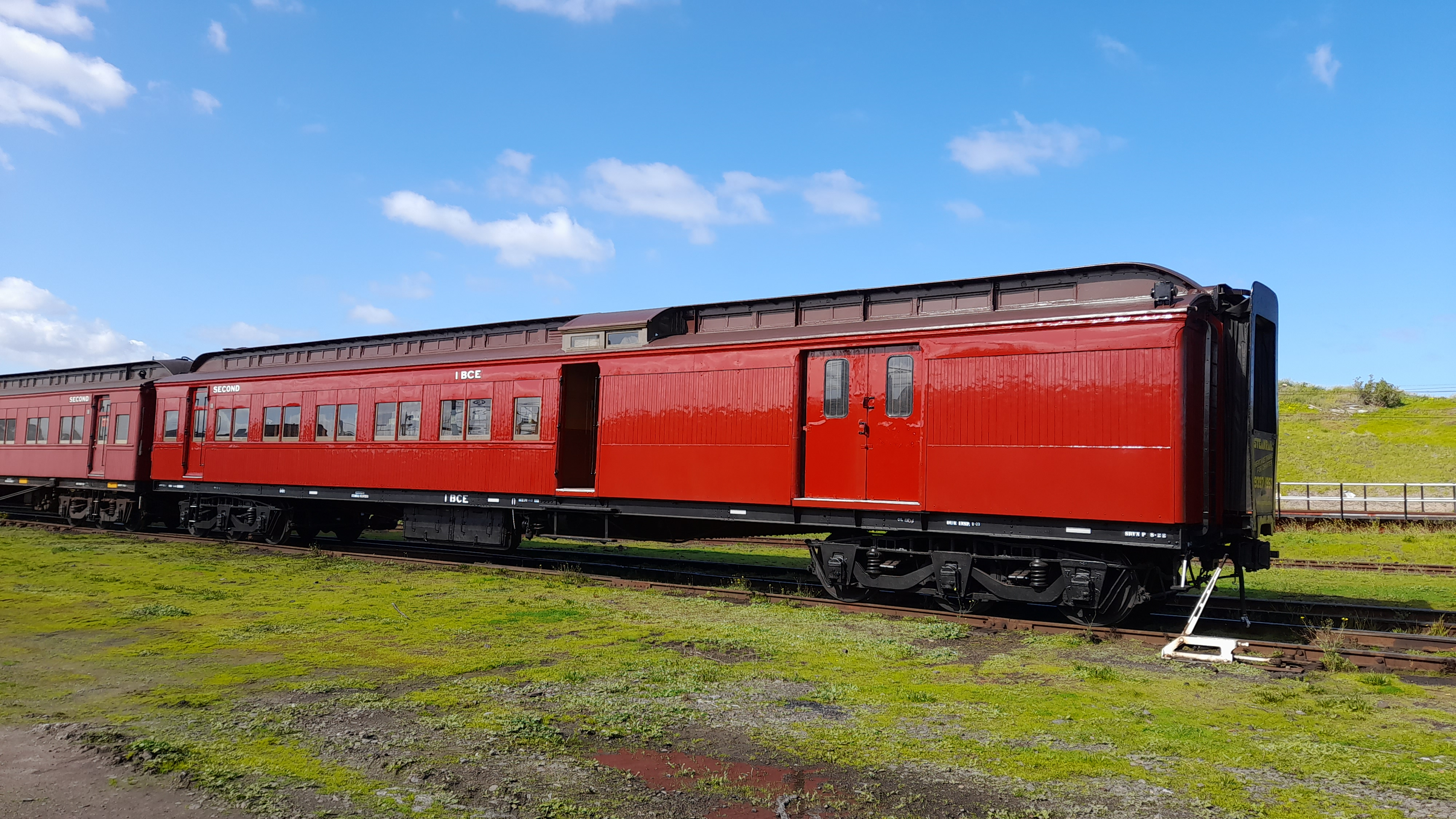
- 1BCE as preserved by Steamrail Victoria
- Constructed: 1909–1910
- Entered service: 1909
- Retired: 1986
- Number built: 10
- Number preserved: 4, 1, 2, 6, & 7 ESBV/BDSE as 1 to 5BCE; 9, 10, & 3 as 45 to 47BE
- Number scrapped: 2
- Design code: ESBV, BDSE, BCE
- Fleet numbers: 1 to 10ESBV/BDSE & 1 to 5BCE
- Capacity: 41 2nd class passengers (1 to10 ESBV/BDSE); 36 2nd class passengers (8 to 10 ESBV/BDSE post modification); 42 2nd class passengers, 9 LT 10 cwt 0 qtr (9.65 t) goods and 8 bikes (1 to 5 BCE)

Specifications
- Weight: 46 LT 10 cwt 0 qtr (47.25 t) unloaded (as BCE)
- Axle load: 11 LT 10 cwt 0 qtr (11.68 t) unloaded (as BCE)

A batch of ten ESBV carriages were built in 1909-1910, generally to the standard E design, but with about half the carriage devoted to mail sorting, for use on express trains on runs such as Melbourne to Bendigo. The cars had two seats at one end opposite the male lavatory, one smoking compartment, three standard, and one ladies' compartment, giving a total seating capacity of 41 passengers. The latter compartment had direct access to the ladies' lavatory from within the compartment, at the expense of one seat. The ladies lavatory was directly opposite a staff lavatory, which adjoined the staff-only mail sorting compartment, which was a little under 30 feet (9 m) long. The mail compartment contained a sorting desk with a pintsch-gas heated wax pot (for letter sealing), a cupboard, four seats and thirty-four pigeon holes on one side, with a framework for storage of sixty mail bags on the other. Besides the inter-carriage diaphragms, the mail sorting compartment was only accessible by a sliding door on each side of the carriage, much like those on DVE vans. 6 to 10ESBV were slightly different internally compared to 1 to 5ESBV — if looking from the mail sorting area towards the passenger area the corridor was on the right, rather than the left as in the first five cars.

After less than a year in traffic, the 1910 re-coding saw the ESBV vans re-lettered to BDSE. While Banger and Medlin express uncertainty as to which ESBVs were delivered with that code and which as BDSEs, Vincent is clear that the 1910 recoding was enacted in July that year, and all ten ESBVs had entered service before that date.

In 1913-14, the last three BDSE cars were modified internally; the ladies compartment and lavatory were removed, replaced with an expanded mail sorting area a little under 40 feet (12 m) long, but with only two seats, 21 mail bag frames, and 12 pigeon holes. In addition, three compartments were smoking and one non-smoking, a reversal of the former arrangement. Notably, all four compartments were now gentleman-exclusive. The external sliding doors near the middle of the car were not moved, but an additional pair of sliding doors were added at the non-passenger end of the carriages. The capacity of these cars was recorded as 36, but that didn't appear to count the two seats opposite the male lavatory. It is thought that these changes were made to allow for the reduced need to sort mail en route, as postal sorting capabilities increased.

Between Decembers of 1922 and 1923, BDSE cars 8, 9, & 10 had their mail sorting facilities removed, being replaced by regular passenger compartments. The cars were renumbered to 44, 45, & 46BE respectively, joined by 3 & 5BDSE in 1929; these last two became 47 & 48BE. These cars had room for 76 passengers in lieu of the normal 72, and as such in later years were classed BEL.

Travelling post office operations ceased in 1932, and three years later the remaining five BDSE carriages were converted from mail sorting use to combined passenger and baggage van use, as class BCE, renumbered 1 to 5 (from 4, 1, 2, 6, & 7 respectively). The change was in response to the spread of mail sorting facilities to country locations, in addition to reduced goods traffic on passenger trains. That meant that large guards vans such as the CE type were not as economic to run because they had no passenger capacity. The BCE cars kept their five passenger compartments, though the mail sorting section was completely stripped and the sides redesigned. The four double-windows and a sliding door were replaced by steel sides, a single door, and a sliding door. Cupolas were also added in the middle of the carriage, to allow guards to look over the roofs of the train.

All five BCE cars have been preserved:
1BCE - Steamrail Victoria
2BCE - Seymour Railway Heritage Centre, previously Victorian Goldfields Railway (not operational). Moved to Seymour for restoration in late 2010.
3BCE - Seymour Railway Heritage Centre
4BCE - Seymour Railway Heritage Centre (not operational)
5BCE - Steamrail Victoria (not operational)

Additionally, three former BDSE cars were saved as BE cars:
45BE (formerly 9BDSE) - Mornington Railway, serviceable
46BE (formerly 10BDSE) - Steamrail Victoria, owned by Victrack, serviceable
47BE (formerly 3BDSE) - Privately owned, being restored.

=== Mail sorting vans ===
In 1907/8, two 60'2" mail vans were constructed by Newport Workshops as part of the E car order. Similar to the ESBV/BDSE cars but without passenger accommodation, these were designed for sorting of the mail with an onboard ten-person crew, specifically for the Melbourne to Adelaide trains. Classed 1 & 2EES, these vans were fitted with facilities for storage for fifteen tons of mail bags, pigeon holes, and two desks each long enough for four mail sorting staff, along with a lavatory. They had only two sets of sliding doors per side, though a cupboard was provided on one side under the middle windows which can be mistaken for a third door on that side.

(A third EES car was converted from O 17 in 1908, although it was a completely different design and completely unrelated to the E series. Built in Adelaide in 1887, it became 3DS in 1910. In 1922 it was converted to a Way & Works car 4WW, but had been scrapped by 1938).

In the 1910 re-coding the EES cars became 1 & 2DS (not to be confused with the later DS van of the Spirit of Progress). Travelling post office operations ceased on the Melbourne-Adelaide corridor on 28 June 1917. In March 1928 they were converted to standard baggage cars and renumbered to 3 & 4D. Bau notes that 4D, at least, retained its end windows when initially converted from mail sorting to mail storage, but later photos show the sides including those windows plated over. As 3D and 4D the mail vans survived until 1973, when they were written off at Islington. The underframes with floors were recycled as workshop transfer vehicles, for shifting heavy loads around. They were also used at one point to transfer bridge beams, until one frame failed after being overloaded.

The ESBV and EES cars introduced the North American style of TPO fittings, with bags suspended and held open by four hooks around a frame instead of the bags just hanging on pegs.

=== Mail storage vans ===
Along with the EES cars, another two 60'2" vans were constructed. They were classed as 1 & 2EEB and were externally similar to their DVE cousins, except that they lacked the guard's cupolas and vestibules at the end of the carriage. Rather, the EEB cars were entirely empty save for two internal semi-partitions for strength, to be used for the transport of twenty tons of mail only.

In the 1910 re-coding/renumbering the EEB vans were re-coded to 1 and 2D. In 1923 van 1D was destroyed in an accident at Glenorchy, and 2D was reallocated to Joint Stock use in 1924 to cover for it. Then, in 1929, van 2D was destroyed in another accident, this time at Callington, South Australia. A few years later a new bulk mail van 1D was built at Islington, with an all-steel body with similar aesthetics to the Victorian Railways' new dining cars Avoca and Hopkins but with a different underframe arrangement.

=== Dining cars ===
Campaspe, Goulburn & Wimmera
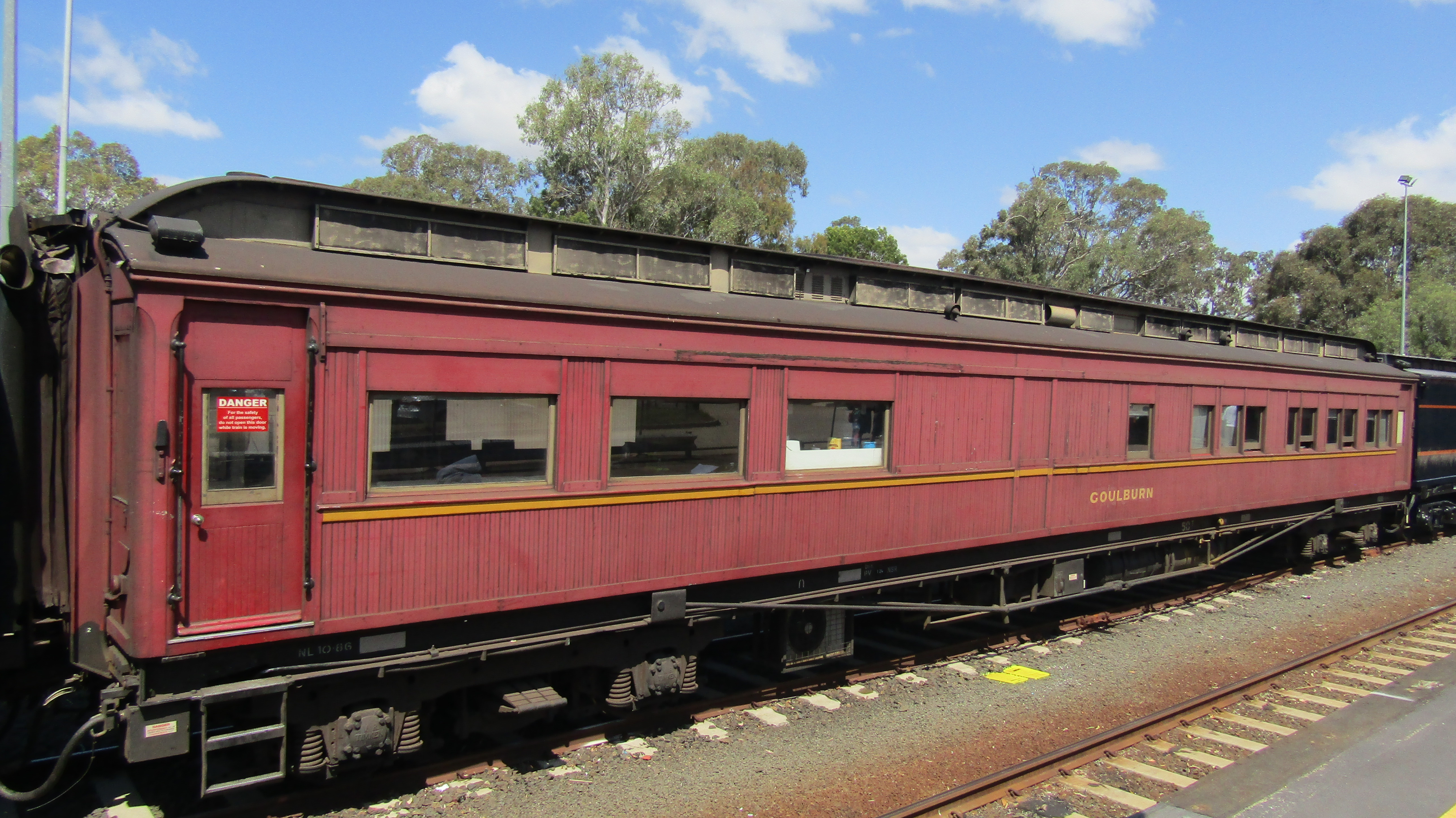
- Former Dining Car Goulburn as preserved in its post-1932 form by Steamrail Victoria
- Constructed: 1908
- Entered service: 1908
- Number built: 3
- Number preserved: All (Campaspe, Goulburn, and Wimmera)
- Capacity: 24 1st class & 18 2nd class diners; Goulburn later 8 sleepers, later 10 sleepers; Medical & Vision Test Car / Wimmera later 3 sleepers

Specifications
- Weight: 49 LT 5 cwt 0 qtr (50.04 t); Goulburn later 49 LT 8 cwt 0 qtr (50.19 t); Wimmera/Medical & Vision Test Car later 46 LT 9 cwt 0 qtr (47.20 t)

In 1908 three Dining cars entered service, Goulburn, Campaspe, and Wimmera, intended for use on the express trains to both Adelaide and Albury (Sydney). All three cars had ornate metal ceilings with high backed leather chairs. In each car the kitchen was fitted with an ice chest, a pintsch-gas stove, a sink, a workbench, and was capped with an open buffet at either end. This was centrally situated between two saloons, one seating 24 first class and the other 18 second class passengers, in a 2+1 row arrangement. A corridor on one side of the carriages allowed passengers and staff to walk between the two ends of the car, though the dining cars were generally marshalled between the first and second class portions of trains to avoid passengers of each class encountering those of the other.

All three cars had their underframes removed and replaced in 1923; the frame from Goulburn was used to build Sleeping car Acheron, the frame from Campaspe for Buchan, and the frame from Wimmera for Angas. It is not clear why this occurred.

Goulburn was altered in 1932 for use as standby Commissioners car for "Reso" and "Holiday Train" tours, with the fitting of 8 berths and two showers in old first dining saloon, and an office and dining room in 2nd class area. In 1938 a third shower was fitted, but from 1939 to 1945 the car was stored at Ballarat due to World War II. In 1953 it was overhauled for the Royal Train and painted blue & gold. It was fitted with windows at one end in 1986, and repainted in 1988 to the Corporate livery of grey & white as a staff car, until displaced by the third Mitta Mitta ex BRS228. In 1991 it was taken to Bendigo to be fitted with head-end power in lieu of axle generators, and it is currently under the control of Steamrail.

Campaspe had a similar history until 1927 when it was replaced with a steel dining car; at that time it was transferred to Albury Express as a buffet car, then a hospital car from 6 February 1942 for the length of WWII. It was stored at North Melbourne from 1945 to 1952 when it was converted to sleep 16 men in longitudinal upper and lower bunks with a centre aisle, and retaining a small kitchen with tables for those 16 people to feed. It ended up on Breakdown train at Dynon in the 1980s. Eventually it was allocated to Plan R (Seven-O-Seven Operations) Victoria before later being transferred to the Seymour Railway Heritage Centre, where it is currently awaiting restoration to operational condition.

Wimmera ran as a Dining car until 1938, when it was converted to the Medical and Vision Test Car. It was withdrawn from service in 1981, but re-entered service in August 1987 painted blue & yellow on Commonwealth bogies with the name Wimmera on side of car. It replaced the medical caravan service that V/Line had tried using in the interim, and was intended to be based in regional areas for weeks or even months at a time. It is currently at the Newport Railway Museum.

=== Parlor cars ===
Parlor Cars Yarra & Murray; State Car No.4, Tambo
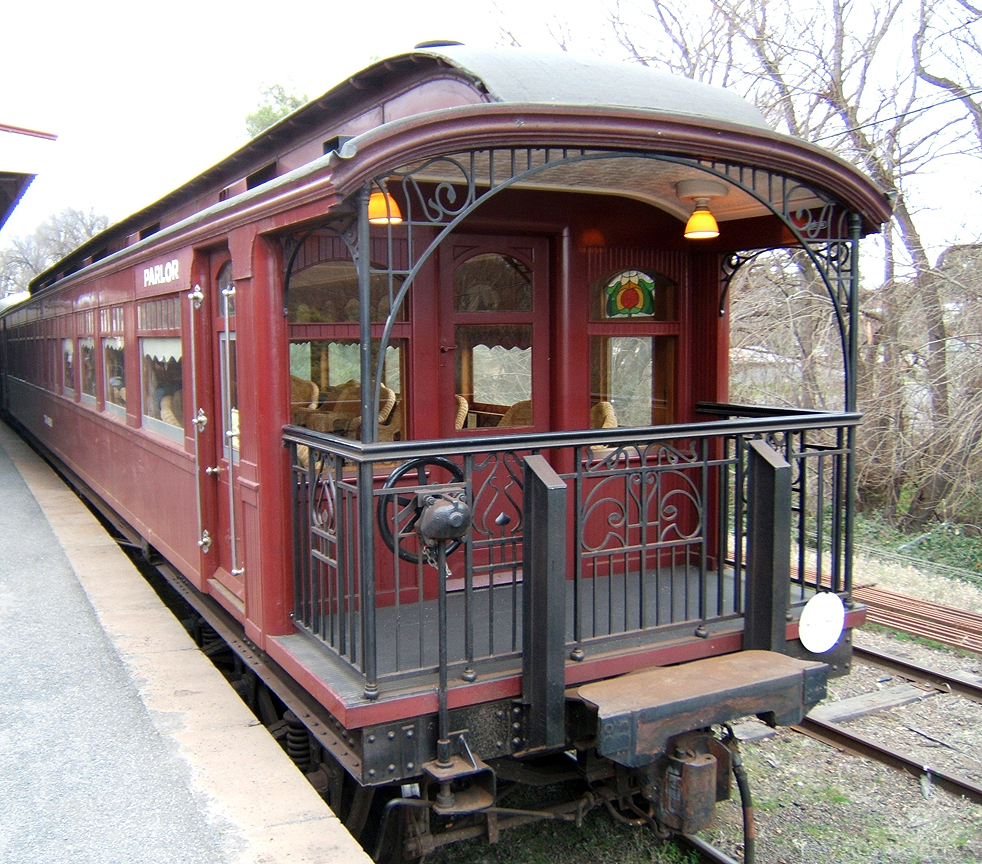
- Parlor car Tambo, a joint stock sleeping car converted by the Victorian Goldfields Railway
- Constructed: 1906
- Entered service: 1906
- Retired: 1983
- Number built: 3
- Number preserved: 2 (Yarra and State Car No.4)
- Number scrapped: 1 (Murray)
- Capacity: 33 1st class passengers (Yarra & Murray); 26 passengers (State Car No.4)

Specifications
- Weight: 34 LT 18 cwt 0 qtr (35.46 t) (Yarra & Murray); 46 LT 17 cwt 0 qtr (47.60 t) (State Car No.4)

Parlor cars Yarra and Murray were built in 1906 to the E car design, with an open observation car balcony at one end, along with a glass end window and lounge. They were used on the Sydney Limited until the introduction of the Spirit of Progress.

At the end of the train, the parlor cars had a 6 ft (1.83 m)-wide open balcony, equipped with folding chairs, surrounded with a wrought-iron fence at waist height and gates (usually kept locked) on either side. A glass pane and inward-opening door on the non-corridor side separated the balcony from the 22 ft 6 in (6.86 m)-long observation room, with three large windows on either side, twelve comfortable armchairs, and a fixed bench seating three. Over that was a bookshelf for passengers' convenience. A corridor ran along the right-hand-side of the carriage (looking from the balcony towards the rest of the train), with four compartments adjacent. Respectively, they were the special (private) compartment, a ladies' compartment with the adjacent ladies' toilet (accessed, unusually for the design, from the corridor rather than directly from the compartment), as well as the conductor's compartment, which also contained limited space for luggage and supplies. The latter compartment, and the wall opposite on the corridor side, was retrofitted shortly after entry to service with an external swinging door in place of two window panes to assist with loading of goods. Beyond the corridor was a 12 ft 6 in (3.81 m) smoking compartment with one long window on each side and five chairs identical to those of the observation compartment. The smoking compartment had a door on each side opening to the platform, although one of the chairs had to be moved if the platform was on the compartment side rather than the corridor side. A short central corridor led to the inter-carriage vestibule, with a gentlemen's lavatory split over both sides: the toilet on the corridor side and the wash basin on the compartment side.

All 33 passengers paid an additional parlor car fare on top of the fare for a reserved, first-class seat. Seat reservations were introduced in 1917, so it is not clear how seat reservations in Yarra and Murray were managed until then.

Murray was operational until the 1950s, when it was removed from bogies and placed in the North Melbourne yards as a classroom for staff. In the early 1960s, the body was demolished and burned.

Yarra was restored by the Australian Railway Historical Society in the 1960s and remains in service today.

State Car No.4 was built in 1912 to a similar exterior design, although the internal fitments were replaced to effectively make the carriage a travelling hotel, with some sleeping compartments.

Yarra and State Car No.4 are both held at the Seymour Railway Heritage Centre.

=== Sleeping cars ===
Sleeping Cars
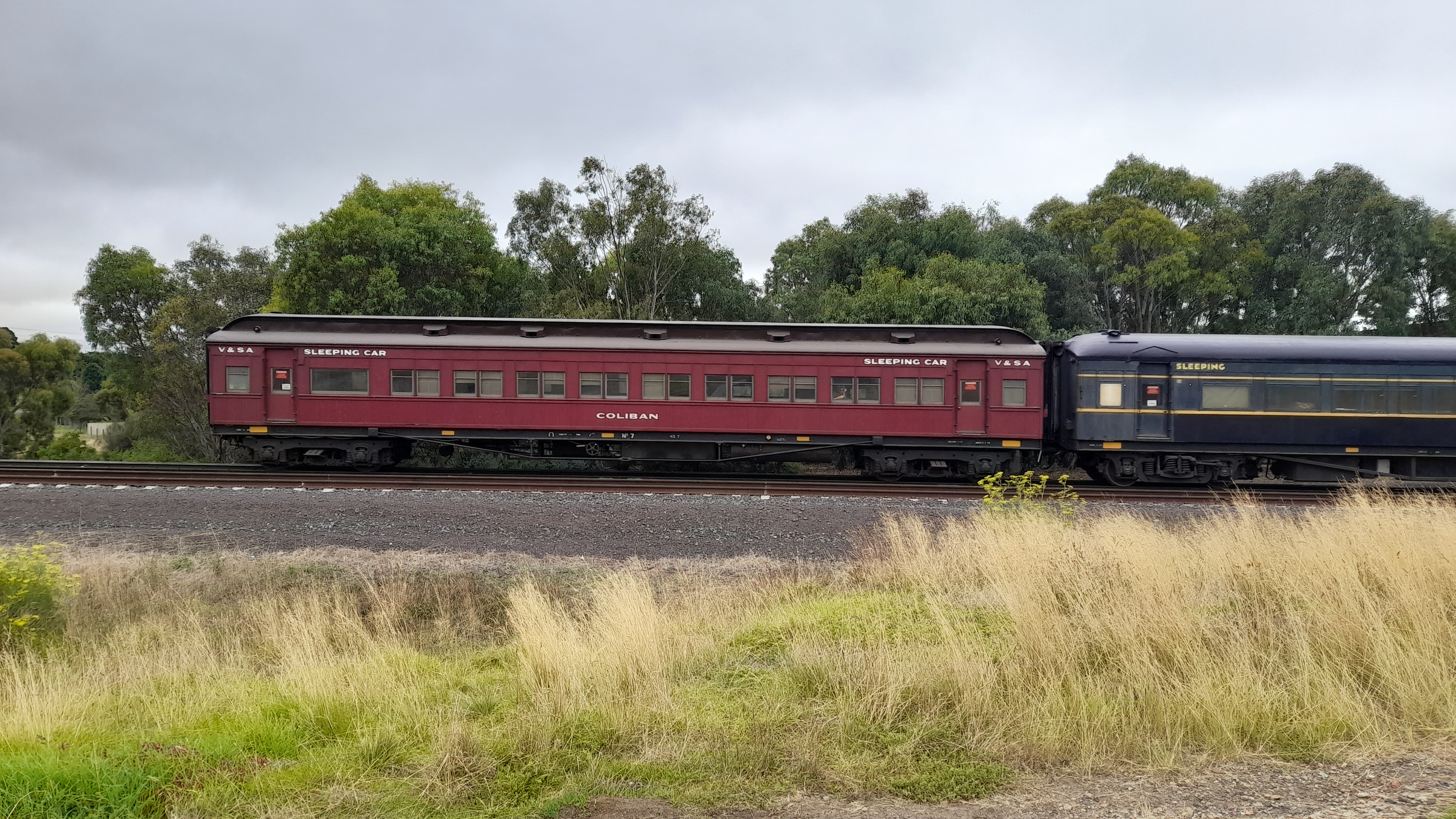
- Sleeping Car Coliban as preserved by Steamrail Victoria

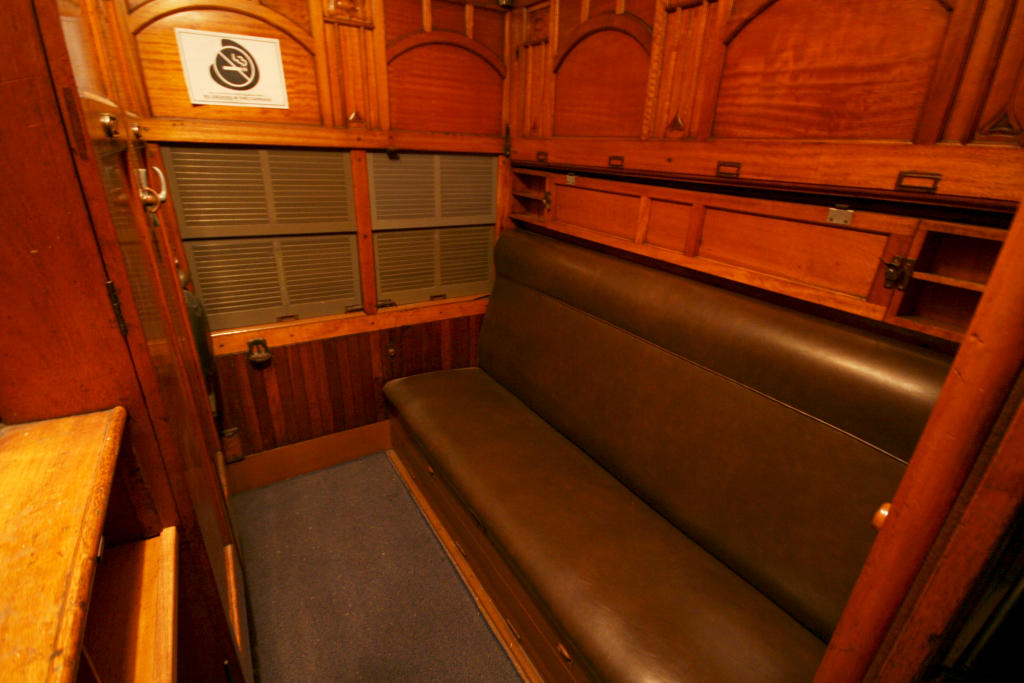
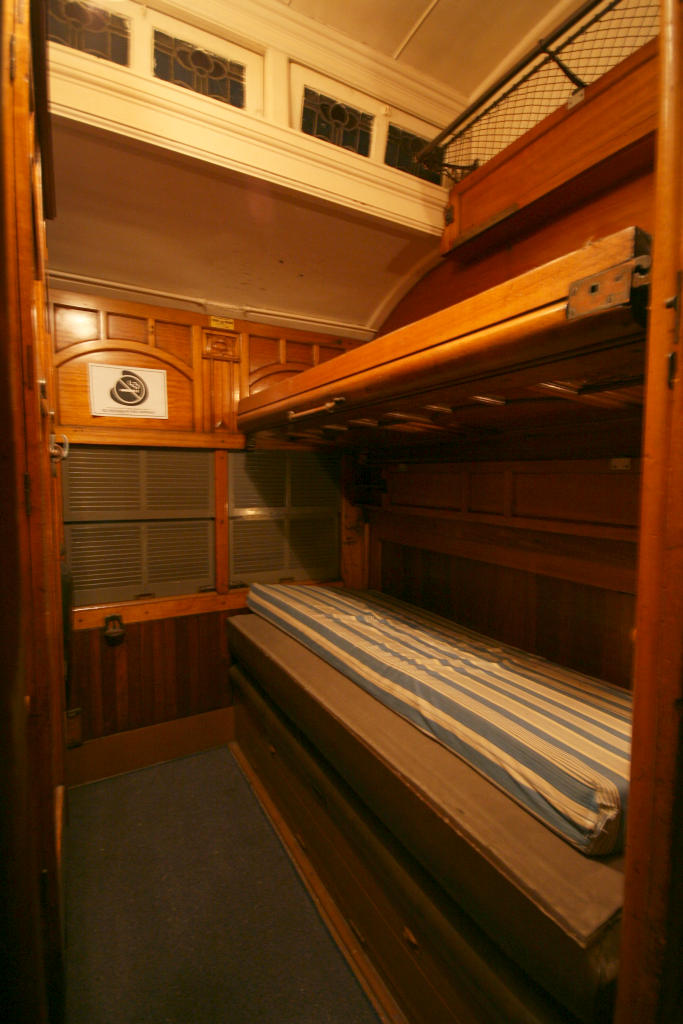
- Sleeping car compartment in day and night configurations
- Constructed: 1907–1923
- Entered service: 1907
- Number built: 16
- Number preserved: 14 - Acheron, Angas, Baderloo, Buchan, Coliban, Dargo, Finnis, Inman, Loddon, Onnkaparinga, Pekina, Tambo, Torrens, Wando
- Number scrapped: 2 - Barwon, Glenelg
- Capacity: 18 sleeping (20 in Buchan & Wando); 24 sitting

Specifications
- Weight: 37 LT 7 cwt 0 qtr (37.95 t) - Melbourne, Ballarat, Wolsely, Adelaide, as built 39 LT 11 cwt 0 qtr (40.18 t) - Loddon, Glenelg, Finniss and Torrens, as upgraded; Barwon, Onkaparinga, as built 41 long tons (41.66 t) - Angas, Acheron, Baderloo, Buchan, Coliban, Dargo, Inman, Pekina, Tambo, Wando, as built 49 long tons (49.79 t) - Buchan, Wando, without air conditioning 52 long tons (52.83 t) - Buchan, with air conditioning

Sixteen E-type sleeping cars were built at Newport Workshops, primarily for the Adelaide - Melbourne service. The first four cars had been built by 1908, and were originally named Melbourne, Ballarat, Wolseley, and Adelaide. In 1910, those cars were renamed Loddon, Glenelg, Finnis, and Torrens respectively, after rivers in the two states.

In 1911, Onkaparinga and Barwon were built, followed by Baderloo, Dargo, Pekina, and Tambo in 1919. In 1923, four more cars were introduced, named Angas, Coliban, Acheron, and Inman, and a further two cars, Buchan and Wando, were constructed to a modified internal design, with the smoking/saloon area replaced with a tenth sleeping compartment, which was slightly longer than the others. Later, three more sleeping cars were built with a similar internal layout, and named Werribee, Indi, and Ovens.

As far as can be ascertained, only the first fourteen cars were built as shared vehicles. The last two, Buchan and Wando, appear to have been solely Victorian Railways rolling stock, built for running on the Mildura line. That is reflected in the 1939 decision by the Victorian Railways, with no input from the South Australian Railways, to remove the names of those sleeping carriages and replace them with numbers 4 & 5, following on from Werribee, Indi, and Ovens having been re-classified as Sleepers 1, 2, & 3 respectively. At the same time Buchan/No.4 was fitted with an air conditioning unit, powered by axle-driven generators.

Notably, Buchan, Acheron, and Angas were built on the underframes originally used under E-type dining cars Campaspe, Goulburn and Wimmera respectively.

With the exception of the last two, the cars were designed with nine, two-berth sleeping compartments, each provided with cupboards and a folding wash basin. In day form, each compartment would be able to sit two passengers. At night, the seat folded down to provide the first bed, and the second was lowered from the wall panels above that seat to provide an upper bunk. A saloon, called the "Gentleman's Smoking Lounge", was provided at one end of the car, and was reserved for smoking passengers. That area was identified by its longer external window on either side, and was supplied with four leather chairs. By the 1950s, they were replaced with two chairs in a different style.

When traffic required it, the lounge area could be converted to a further two berths but, due to lack of privacy, that section was charged at normal first-class rates instead of the higher first-class sleeper rates applied to the compartments. At the non-smoking end, two of the compartments were reserved for ladies, separated from the rest of the car by swinging doors in the side corridor, identical to the one separating the lounge from the corridor at the other end. Each compartment was accessed by sliding doors fitted with coloured leadlight windows, rather than plain glass. There was an attendant's room at both ends of each car, one of which had tea-making facilities and a lavatory.

Like the other E cars, the sleepers initially had a strong Edwardian style, with features including carved paneling, pressed metal ceilings, frosted glass, and ornately decorated lamp pendants. A row of beveled mirrors, with an engraved starburst pattern, was installed on the outside of the cars, above the windows on either side. Three mirrored panels were provided above each compartment window, and seven over the saloon windows. The panels were painted over in later years, due to the deterioration of the silvering on the mirrors.

The first run of the cars in service was on a parliamentary special to Echuca on 17 October 1907, using sleepers Melbourne, Adelaide, Ballarat, and parlor car Murray, which left Melbourne at 5:30pm. From 31 October, the cars were regularly scheduled on the Intercolonial Express from Melbourne to Adelaide.

Tambo, Angas, Coliban, Acheron, and Inman were provided with electric lighting from new and, as noted above, Buchan and Wando featured a tenth compartment instead of a lounge area, thereby providing 20 berths.

==== The Overland ====
From 1936, to introduce the new name for the Melbourne to Adelaide express, the named joint-stock cars were externally painted dark green, with The Overland in chrome plated letters on the fascia panel above the windows. From 1943, the green scheme was replaced by the standard Victorian Railways bright red passenger-car livery.

==== Split fleet ====
As steel cars were introduced to the Overland from late 1949, the timber cars were split among the two systems. In 1950, the South Australian Railways purchased Victoria's share in Angas, Dargo, Finnis (ex Wolseley), Onkaparinga, and Tambo, leaving nine cars in joint stock service. Angas had been purchased in March and Finnis in April. At time of sale, both were painted in the green and yellow scheme and, from the late 1950s, were fitted with half-drop windows and steel side-sheets. By the 1960s, both had been repainted into red with silver stripes, in something of a facsimile of the new Overland scheme. It seems likely that Dargo and Onkaparinga experienced the same changes, given that Onkaparinga had the steel sides in place when it was finally withdrawn. However, Tambo did not have steel sides fitted below the windows in 1985.

A further four Joint Stock cars, Baderloo, Barwon, Glenelg (ex Ballarat), and Torrens (ex Adelaide), were condemned in 1967. It is likely that Barwon and Glenelg were scrapped Baderloo was sold without bogies and moved to Junction Road, Littlehampton, South Australia, and Torrens was transferred to the then-new Australian Railway Historical Society museum in Newport, Victoria, where it became a static exhibit.

==== South Australian cars ====
The South Australian cars were allocated to the Mount Gambier overnight service, with Finnis and Angas being externally rebuilt in 1953 to provide a better quality of travel. Tambo, Onkaparinga, and Dargo were not refurbished, though, at some point, Onkaparinga was fitted with steel sheeting over the sides in an attempt to preserve the timber. In 1972, the South Australian Railways sold Onkaparinga to the Marbury School in Aldgate, with bogies. In 1988, it was donated to the Port Dock Station Railway Museum.

In 1974, Dargo was condemned and sold without bogies to a private property in Lameroo, South Australia, where it was stored undercover. Tambo followed in 1975. On 24 September 1976, while on the Mount Gambier run, Angas caught fire due to a worn brake block generating sparks and heat. There were no injuries and passengers were transferred to an adjacent carriage, but most of the car was damaged and the repair cost was estimated to be "in excess of $30,000". As a result, the car was withdrawn from service. At the same time the other cars were withdrawn and placed into storage.

Finnis and Angas were passed to the Australian Railway Historical Society's South Australian division, operating as SteamRanger. Finnis stayed at SteamRanger, where it still operates, while Angas was sold to the Yorke Peninsula Railway, due to the high cost of repairing it. Angas eventually ended up in New South Wales, where it was repaired and turned into B&B accommodation. It was planned that Tambo would go to the Pichi Richi Railway but, after being stored for several years at Peterborough, it was transferred to SteamRanger in 1980, then awaiting restoration at their Dry Creek depot.

==== Victorian cars ====
In 1965, the Victorian Railways introduced the Train of Knowledge, essentially a mobile school camp for week-long tours. The train made use of the E-type sleeping cars for students and teachers, because they were increasingly being displaced by newer steel cars.

The remaining five Joint Stock sleepers, Acheron, Coliban, Inman, Pekina, and Loddon (ex Melbourne) became part of the Victorian Railways fleet on 27 June 1969. They had their names removed and replaced with numbers, becoming Sleeping cars No.6 to 10, following on from No.5 ex Wando.

Between November 1983 and May 1984, those carriages were upgraded. Restoration work included repainting, re-varnishing, replacing the upholstery and carpets, the fitting of retention toilets, and the reinstatement of the pre-1969 names.

==== Current status ====
As noted above, Barwon and Glenelg were most likely scrapped in 1967.

SteamRanger in South Australia initially had Angas, Coliban, Finnis, Inman, and Tambo. Of those, Finnis has always been in operational condition, both before and after the move from Dry Creek to the Victor Harbor line. However, in 1995, Angas was sold for use on the Yorke Peninsula Tourist Railway. When that operation closed in 2009, the car was sold to Australian Train Movers, and transferred to Londonderry, New South Wales. In 2011, it was delivered to Little Forest Country Cottages in the Southern Highlands of New South Wales and, by the end of 2012, it had been restored as bed and breakfast accommodation.

Tambo was sold to West Coast Railway in the mid-1990s, and delivered to their Ballarat East depot in 1996. When West Coast Railway closed in 2004, the car was sold privately and it has since been restored to operational condition, though half-converted to a parlor car style, similar to Yarra and Murray. It runs on the Victorian Goldfields Railway (VGR). Acheron was allocated to the VGR in August 2017 and returned to service following restoration in 2022.Coliban and Inman were sold in 1997-98 and transferred by road to Steamrail Victoria, operating out of the West Block of the Newport Workshops. There, they joined Werribee and Indi. Most of the cars are now serviceable. Also at Newport, 707 Operations has Buchan under restoration, and it was joined by Wando in 2017. Torrens is in the Newport Railway Museum and, as of 2021, its internal and external restoration was progressing. As of 2026, Wando is now with Steamrail Victoria, used as a crew car.

In the early 1990s, the majority of the Train of Knowledge consist, including sleeping carriages Wando, Acheron, Pekina, and Loddon, was allocated to the Seymour Railway Heritage Centre. The first three were deemed surplus to requirements in 2017, with Acheron transferred to the Victorian Goldfields Railway, Pekina to the Overland Museum in Nhill, and Wando to 707 Operations.

In 2010, Onkaparinga was restored to early its 1950s condition at the Port Dock Rail Museum.

In 1986, Baderloo was noted as being in poor condition and, in 2003, it was sold to Jim Emmett of the Mount Lofty railway station. The carriage was to be stabilised and transferred to the gardens of station, for restoration as a static exhibit. The move was called off because of difficulties in arranging transport, so the vehicle remained in Littlehampton, wrapped in tarps.

Dargo is currently undercover on private property.

== In service ==
=== First delivery phase (1906-1912) ===
==== Melbourne to Albury (NSW) ====
From the beginning, the E cars were organised into fairly fixed consists, as demonstrated by their delivery dates. 28 August and 30 October 1906 each had the release of an AVE-AVE-AVBE-BVE-BVE-DVE consist, with the accompanying Parlor cars entering service a few months later; Yarra on 31 October and Murray on 19 December 1906. These trains ran from Melbourne to Albury, connecting to the New South Wales express trains to Sydney at Albury station. All of these cars save for Murray had been released to service by the 1906 Melbourne Cup.

Originally, these trains were intended to run with the DVE van adjacent to the locomotive tender, followed by the second class, first class and Parlor car portions; however, for the first few years the DVE ran between the last First Class and the Parlor car. It has been speculated that this may have been due to management and unions being uncomfortable with the concept of the guard being so far from the end of the train (which he was supposed to protect). Within a year or two the DVE vans had been repositioned behind the locomotive, possibly in conjunction with the introduction of the Dining Cars.

==== Melbourne to Adelaide (SA) ====
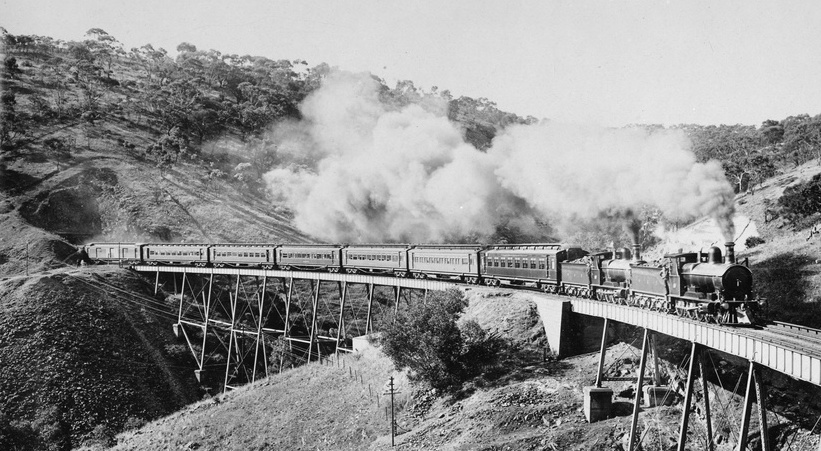
Melbourne Express in 1918, with seven E Type carriages visible in the consist.

The second batch of E cars consisted of twenty-four vehicles; six AVE and BVE cars (numbered 6-10 each), four each Sleeping cars and DVE vans, one EEB and two EES vans, which entered service across October 1907 to March 1908, plus another EEB as part of Victoria's intrastate fleet. The SAR built 9 of the cars plus one underframe at Islington Workshops to cover 40% of the construction cost (as agreed between the SAR and VR commissioners), though the body of this tenth car was constructed at Newport. Newsrail (1995) does not record the typical consist for these trains, but a 1918 photo of the Melbourne Express in South Australia shows a consist that appears, based on the window arrangements, to be an AE (8 windows), three sleeping cars (10 windows), then two BE cars (9 windows) and a CE van; though none of the mail vans are visible in the photo. Another photo, from 1920, shows a similar arrangement of an AE car then sleeping cars, though the rest of the train is obscured. Other, later photos generally indicate a consist of about seven carriages.

The first run of the interstate batch of E carriages was on 17 October 1907, when cars Melbourne, Adelaide and Ballarat were included as part of a Parliamentary special tour from Melbourne to Echuca for the Murray River. The cars were regularly scheduled on the Melbourne/Adelaide Express services from 31 October 1907.

In 1908 the majority of the prior joint-stock V&SAR fleet was divided up between the Victorian and South Australian Railways; this consisted of 12 sitting cars, four guards vans, three post office vans, two mail baggage vans, and four sleeping carriages, and was replaced by the 24 new vehicles almost on a one-for-one basis. As noted above, 3EES was taken from joint stock and became the third Victorian Railways post office sorting van, so it still could have been used on the interstate train if either 1EES or 2EES was unavailable. This left only two non-E Type joint stock carriages in use, the fifth and sixth Mann Boudoir sleeping carriages which had been introduced to the service in 1899.

==== Victorian country services ====
After construction of the Melbourne/Adelaide Express fleet there was a brief pause in E Type carriage construction, then Newport Workshops and its subcontracting Butty Gangs started construction on a fleet for use in Victoria. In August 1908, 21 carriages - 3-6ABVE, 11-17AVE, 11-178VE and 7-9DVE - entered service, followed by 10-16CE and the three dining cars between October 1908 and March 1909. June and July 1909 saw the addition of enough carriages to make two sets of AVE-AVE-ABVE-BVE-BVE, although the BVE cars in this group were 18, 21, 24 and 25 rather than the next in sequence. September 1909 added 2 ABVE, 5 AVE, 2 BVE and the first ESBV, them October through December was another eight BVE cars along with 5, 6 and 7ESBV. Four more ESBV/BDSE cars, 4, 8, 9 and 10, were delivered in early 1910, then 11 and 12ABE in July, 2 and 3BDSE in August, 29 and 32AE and 33 and 35BE in September. October 1910 added another ten cars which could be used to form a pair of AE-AE-ABE-BE-BE sets, and November and December had six AE, two BE and the final two ABE cars.

Deliveries in 1911 was nine CE vans and two more joint stock sleeping cars (Onkaparinga and Barwon). At this point there were ten each joint-stock AE and BE cars, eight vans (four CE, 2 each D and DS), and six sleeping cars. For service on Victorian trains there were three dining cars, the two Parlors and State Car No.4, ten joint mail sorting vans, and 32 AE, 16 ABE, 33 BE and 21 CE cars; though it is not clear why one additional BE car was built. Around this time production at Newport Workshops shifted over to the W cars, although in May 1912 State Car No.4 entered service with a similar external arrangement to the 1906 Parlor cars Yarra and Murray. W type cars continued to enter service at a fairly even rate until the end of June 1914, stopping about a month before World War I.

By the end of the 1912/1913 financial year, the E and W cars were being regularly rostered on trains from Melbourne on the Northern corridor through Bendigo to Korong Vale, Wycheproof, Chillingollah, Swan Hill and Echuca; on the West and South Western networks through Geelong to Port Fairy, through Ballarat to Mildura, Dimboola, Hopetoun, Portland, as well as the cross-country Geelong-Ballarat and Ballarat-Castlemaine lines; on the North-Eastern corridor to Albury as well as branches to Yarrawonga, Bright, Tallangatta and Numurkah-Cobram; and on the south-eastern corridor to Port Albert. Having more trains scheduled with inter-carriage walkthroughs made it practical to provide conductors on more services, improving train running, ticket checking and customer service, although it would not be until the late 1960s that the last non-corridor stock would be removed from country service.

Cars 34AE and 33BE were burned down to the underframes at Lindenow in 1912, both being returned to Newport Workshops for reconstruction and re-entering service in 1914.

The ESBV and EES cars were used for sorting of mail en route as Travelling Post Offices, so as to reduce the load on smaller post offices which would not have had the staff required for such a task. The first travelling post office service in Victoria was between Melbourne, Geelong and Ballarat from 20 February 1865, but by the time of the E type carriages' introduction, the common routes were the above-mentioned Adelaide express train with its EES van (primarily for overseas mail), and the ESBV/BDSE cars on services to Albury, Bacchus Marsh-Ballarat-Stawell, Bendigo, Cobram, Port Albert, Port Fairy, and Sale-Maffra-Bairnsdale.

=== Second delivery phase (1919) ===
By 1919 the demand for sleeping cars skyrocketed on the Melbourne-Adelaide train; this was due to a lack of watercraft still in serviceable condition after World War 1, in addition to the recent opening of the then-new Trans-Australian Railway from Port Augusta to Kalgoorlie and on to Perth. After another fifteen W cars had been built between late 1918 and early 1919, four E type joint stock sleeping cars entered service - Baderloo and Pekina in August, then Dargo and Tambo in October. These four were the first E cars to be fitted with electric lighting, and featured a modified seat design which separated the seat and seat-back components from those of the berths. These cars were constructed with Australian Maple with a clear varnish, in lieu of the earlier Cedar. These cars allowed removal of the last of the pre-E type Mann Boudoir joint stock sleeping carriages, with one each to the Victorian and South Australian systems. The Victorian carriage was named Latrobe and allocated to the Mildura service.

=== Third delivery phase (1923-1931) ===
Demand steadily increased over the next few years, and by the early 1920s it had reached a point where even more carriages were required. This resulted in the 1923 construction of another six sleeping cars, four first- and four second-class passenger carriages and 2 CE vans for Joint Stock service, plus another five CE vans for regular service. Once again Islington Workshops were called upon to provide a fair share on construction and associated costs, so the BE and CE Joint Stock cars were built there, with the Sleeper and AE cars built at Newport. Parsons notes that these Joint Stock cars were probably the first to feature a pressure-water service with tanks attached to the underframe, in lieu of the prior gravity-fed system based on water tanks in the car roofs.

By the 1920s the external finish of the carriages was actively being simplified. For example, the Joint Stock cars were labelled "V&SAR" instead of "VICTORIAN & SOUTH AUSTRALIAN RAILWAYS", and carriage classes and codes were changed from elaborate gold serif fonts to white lettering on black-painted rectangles at the centre of the carriage. For reference, W type carriage 39AW was preserved in this simplified arrangement as of 2005. Around the same time, the chrome bars fitted to the window frames, and the external mirrors, were removed.

Six more W cars entered service in 1922, then August to November 1923 had sixteen additional joint stock carriages built (4 AE, 4 BE, 2 CE and 6 sleepers), along with five more Victorian CE vans. Finally, in 1924 the last five CE vans were constructed, these featuring a curved roof in lieu of the former clerestory design, which had been superseded as electric lighting meant the carriages no longer required sunlight to illuminate compartments during daytime.

As of July 1929, the Victorian Railways had installed electric lighting in 531 carriages across their fleet; this probably included the vast majority, if not all, of the pintsch gas lit carriages. Pintsch gas had been introduced with the E cars' predecessors, the V type carriages, in 1898 when they were used on the Sydney express service, with the gas produced at Spencer Street depot using oil supplied from New South Wales. The plant continued to provide pintsch gas until October 1956, then a mixture of town gas and oil refinery gas was piped to Spencer street from the West Melbourne Gas Works in lieu.

To accommodate changing traffic demand, at the end of 1922 8BDSE was rebuilt as 44BE, followed by 9 and 10BDSE to 45 and 46BE in 1923 and 3 and 5BDSE as 47 and 48BE in 1929, while March 1928 saw both DS cars reconfigured as D bulk mail vans.

Three more sleeping carriages, named Werribee, Indi and Ovens, were built in 1928 for Victorian use on the Mildura corridor to a modified design, and those are covered on the Long W cars page; although it is worth noting that the delivery of these three cars permitted the scrapping of Victoria's three ex-V&SAR Mann Boudoir sleeping cars, which had been inherited in 1908 and 1919. Lastly, a replacement for destroyed van 15CE in 1930, to the same design as 33-37CE in 1924.

Joint Stock bulk mail van 1D was destroyed in a collision at Glenorchy in 1923, and replaced by Victoria's identical van 2D in 1924, until that too was destroyed at Callington, South Australia, in 1929. Islington Workshops constructed a replacement all-steel bulk mail van 1D, which entered service in 1931.

=== Fleet upgrades, World War II and aftermath (1932-1949) ===
By the end of their second decade in service the class as a whole had undergone some modifications; most cars were fitted with electric lighting, half the BDSE fleet had been converted to BE cars and both DS cars were converted to D type vans due to the declining requirements for on-train mail sorting.

In 1932 travelling post operations were suspended, making the remaining five BDSE vans less economic to use. Vincent notes that these were stored in 1933/34. In 1935 these were all converted to composite sitting and guard's van coaches, classed 1 through 5 BCE, allowing them to be used at the rear of trains where the expected luggage load was reduced and did not require a full-size van.

From the dates below, it is clear that 4BDSE was the trial, as it was the first into the workshops and spent nearly 500 days being rebuilt while the others were much faster.

BDSE	Stored	To W/S	Ex W/S as BCE
1	22 April 1933	14 January 1935	12 April 1935 as 2BCE
2	27 February 1934	14 January 1935	12 April 1935 as 3BCE
4	n/a	17 November 1933	5 March 1935 as 1BCE
6	17 November 1933	14 January 1935	24 May 1935 as 4BCE
7	27 February 1934	14 January 1935	12 April 1935 as 5BCE

==== Automatic couplers ====
From 1935 the E fleet started to gain automatic couplers, along with strengthened underframes, anti-telescoping beams at either end, air-conditioning and rubber pads in the bogies to reduce vibration and noise. The first automatic coupled carriages were 12AE-23AE-17BE-20BE from April 1935, which worked as a fixed block on the Albury Express with screw couplers on the outer ends to ensure compatibility with other stock. The conversion reduced slack and increased strength between carriages, significantly improving the ride quality. From September that year automatic-coupled blocks of E cars were also used on the Sydney Limited, and by June 1936 both those trains and the Overland were formed entirely with automatic-coupled sets of carriages. Vincent notes that Inman spent four months at the workshops being converted to automatic couplers; this may or may not be indicative of the degree of work required. Additionally, some cars were fitted with automatic coupler draught boxes and transition hooks earlier in the year, with full conversion to automatic couplers being completed in June 1936. World War II delayed the conversion program, and by the end of 1947 only half the E Fleet had been converted, including the Joint Stock fleet, Goulburn, Campaspe, Yarra, Murray and State Car No.4. As cars were upgraded to automatic couplers the frames were strengthened and anti-telescoping beams were added at the carriage ends.

==== Air conditioning ====
Two sets of air-conditioning equipment were obtained from the UK firm J Stone and Company, and December 1935 saw 36AE re-entering service as the first all-sitting, country carriage in the British Empire to be fully air-conditioned. Four other carriages - one briefly in the London Tube, a sleeping carriage in Canada and two buffet cars on the Great Western Railway - had been fitted previously but these were all at least partial buffet or sleeping cars, and the first fully-air-conditioned train had entered service in the United States in 1931. Notably, 36AE had almost-full-length ducts for the air conditioning system on either side of its clerestory roof, significantly altering its appearance. The car was outshopped to advertise its benefits to passengers, as well as to enable staff to become accustomed to the new operating procedures. The second set of equipment was fitted to Dining car Avoca, which re-entered service in February 1936. 36AE was regularly rostered on the Sydney Limited until the Spirit of Progress entered service in late 1937; it was then briefly transferred to the Albury Express before moving to the Overland and the Mildura overnight trains in conjunction with other carriages similarly fitted.

Additional equipment was ordered and fitted a total of fifteen E type carriages, with Buffet Car (ex 34AE, later Taggerty) entering service on the Bendigo line, and two further sitting carriages 1AE and 31BE in March 1937, and the three Long W sleeping cars in July the same year. Another pair of sitting cars, 3AE-4BE, entered service in January 1938, followed by 19BE, 34BE and Sleeper No.4 (ex Buchan) in the middle of 1938, and 12AE in early 1939. This left two sets of equipment unused, which would later be provided to Restaurant Cars Kiewa (ex 21AE, not to be confused with the former Mann-Boudoir sleeping car) and Moyne (ex 26AE). By the late 1930s, the Railways' four sleeping and eight sitting air-conditioning E and Long W cars (1, 3, 12, 36AE; 4, 19, 31, 34BE; Sleepers No.1 to No.4) were allocated with one or two sitting cars on the Albury Express, Sleeper No.4 to the Overland, and two sets of Sleeper-AE-BE to the Mildura overnight consists which had a two-day turnaround. This left one sleeping and two or three air conditioned seating carriages spare for maintenance purposes, plus the buffet car Taggerty on the Bendigo corridor. When the Long W cars were outshopped with air conditioning their names were replaced with new identities as "Sleeper No.X", numbers 1, 2 and 3 in order of construction, and Buchan became Sleeper No.4 when it re-entered service in 1938. The Joint Stock sleeping cars retained their names at this stage.

The 13 air-conditioned E and Long W cars were rostered with one or two sitting cars to the Albury Express, one sleeping car (No.4, formerly Buchan) to the Overland, and three cars (Sleeper-AE-BE set) to all Mildura Overnight trains. Around this time, all the Sleepers lost their names, to be replaced with "Sleeper No.X". The three newest Sleepers became No.1 to 3, and the older sleepers occupied numbers 4 to 10; Angas, Baderloo, Barwon, Finnis, Glenelg, Onkaparinga, Tambo, and Torrens were not renumbered, with many of these sold to the SAR in the early 1950s.

==== Other changes ====
The 1935/36 Victorian Railways annual report mentioned that a number of Joint Stock sleeping cars had been provided with rubber pads on the bogies to reduce noise, but it is not known whether this was rolled out more generally.

In 1936 the Overland cars were painted in a green, black, and yellow scheme to match the express passenger engines of the South Australian Railways.

In June 1935, car 34AE was delivered to Newport Workshops for conversion to the Victorian Railways' first buffet car. It was outshopped on 10 March 1937, with an internal arrangement where three compartments at the former Ladies' end were retained, but the rest of the car was converted to an open space with a series of food preparation equipment along one side, an extended serving counter along the middle, and 18 bar stools following the contour of the counter. The car was air conditioned from the outset, and after a month or so of trials it was permanently rostered on the Bendigo corridor. The concept proved popular enough that then-spare dining car Campaspe was allocated to the Albury Express by September the same year, pending delivery of upcoming S type carriages later named Moorabool and Tanjil with similar internal arrangements, and Mitta Mitta and Wimmera with full-length buffets and no sitting passenger accommodation. On entry to service in December 1938, the new all-steel buffet carriage later known as Wimmera replaced Campaspe on the Albury Express. The E Type buffet car was named Taggerty in 1939. Two additional AE carriages were delivered to Newport Workshops for conversion to buffet cars in 1939, 21AE and 26AE, but the outbreak of World War II put that program into abeyance. The cars spent nearly 20 years in the workshops, finally re-entering service in October 1955 as Restaurant cars Kiewa and Moyne respectively, for the Warrnambool and Horsham lines.

The release of the name Wimmera to the new steel buffet car was made possible by the withdrawal of E type dining carriage Wimmera around the same time. It re-entered service in October 1938 as the Medical and Test Vision Car, acting as a mobile doctor's office to run around the state and provide medical services and testing to railway employees on a regular basis, particularly those who lived in remote areas.

With the outbreak of the second world war, the E fleet, along with the rest of the Victorian Railways, was placed under great strain. Special purpose cars, such as the Medical and Vision Test and the Parlor Cars were placed into deep storage around the state (Goulburn, for example, was stored at Ballaarat), because the entire force of the Railways was pushed into dedicated war service and there was no remaining track or locomotive capacity for frivolities. Early 1942 saw dining car Campaspe and Sleeping Car No.5 used along with eleven BPL cars and a C Van as a dedicated military ambulance train, available for quick deployment if required. Taggerty was withdrawn from the Bendigo line and placed into storage on 20 June 1942, not returning until October 1949.

To reduce the maintenance load, the Joint Stock carriages reverted from the 1936 hawthorn green scheme to the standard Victorian Railways' red from 1943. In the intervening years reduced cleaning staff had amplified the degradation of these carriages' appearance, particularly due to exhaust from hard-working locomotives through the Adelaide Hills. In the late 1940s, 7BE, 3CE, 26CE, 1D, & 4D were all spotted in red; 3D had been red in 1944 but plain black in 1945, while 1D was black between 1944-1945 then red from 1946 on.

During the War and the aftermath, the South Australian Railways hired some of the E type carriages to bolster their fleet. By 1950 the cars included were 4AE, 11AE, 13AE, & 14AE. The South Australian Railways' country train plan from 20 February 1944 shows 19AE-781-706-605-600-11AE-13AE as one consist forming a Victor Harbor run, and also includes reference to 4AE; that car was seen on Terowie services on 27 December 1951. It is possible that this arrangement continued until the SAR purchased the Victorian Railways' share in 7AE & 8AE, except that during the October 1952 long weekend they also hired 42BE, and in February 1954 they hired 9AE to replace a 500 class passenger car in one of their West-East express consists.

=== The Steel Overland, the Standard Gauge and the Blue & Gold (1949-1980) ===
As new steel carriages were introduced for The Overland from 1949, the joint-stock E Type carriage fleet was progressively split among the VR and SAR. The South Australian Railways purchased the Victorian Railways' equity in some cars and vice versa for others. By 1969 the whole fleet had been distributed, with Barwon and Glenelg scrapped, Baderloo sold, Torrens preserved, Angas, Dargo, Finnis, Onkaparinga, and Tambo going to the South Australian Railways, while Acheron, Coliban, Inman, Pekina, and Loddon went to the Victorian Railways, joining their pre-existing fleet of Long W and E type cars Sleeper No.1 through No.5.

Little changed at the end of the war as it took many years to catch up on the backlog of maintenance. In 1949 Taggerty was restored to the Bendigo train after a seven-year absence. In 1954 Queen Elizabeth II and the Duke of Edinburgh travelled around Australia, their Royal train in Victoria included E cars State Car No.4, Goulburn, and 34CE, in addition to State No.5, the Dining Car from the Spirit of Progress, Avoca, and three AS cars. This made State 4, Goulburn, and 34CE the first E cars to be painted in Victorian Railways Blue and Gold.

On 10 October 1955 Restaurant cars Kiewa and Moyne, formerly 21AE and 26AE respectively, entered service on the Warrnambool and Horsham lines, having finally been completed after being put on hold during the war. In these roles the two cars took the place of steel cars Tanjil and Moorabool, which had been introduced just before the war broke out and were withdrawn and stored thereafter.

From 5 May 1960 a pair of air-conditioned E cars, 12AE and 31BE, regularly appeared on the 6:12 pm Melbourne to Yarram train, returning by the 7:10 am trip the next day; this was the final long-distance train in Victoria to receive air-conditioned rolling stock. However, by July "weekend restrictions" forced the use of non-aircondtioned carriages on the Saturday 8:10 pm train to Yarram, which formed the 7:10 am Monday return.

From 1959 to 1963, 102 E Type carriages were provided with upgraded axle-mounted generators for better lighting - 12 of the 14 Joint Stock sleepers, 7 of 9 remaining Joint Stock AE cars and all 8 remaining Joint Stock BE cars, 21 of 29 remaining AE, and the whole of the 33 BE, 16 ABE and 5 BCE cars in the Victorian fleet. The old generators were cascaded to the PL type carriages, allowing their upgrades from Pintsch gas to electric lighting.

From the late 1950s a number of CE vans, in addition to the air conditioned sitting AE and BE cars, were painted into Blue and Gold. The program started with 17CE, 35CE, & 36CE in 1957, while the first sitting car to be treated as such was 1AE in 1959. Four years later the program was completed, with the repainting of Taggerty.

==== Impacts of the Standard Gauge ====
With the 1962 completion of the new standard gauge line from Wodonga to Melbourne, a large portion of the S and Z fleet of steel carriages were lost to the new services on that line and the VR realised that this would create a shortfall of air conditioned rolling stock on the broad gauge. In a proactive move in 1961, Kiewa and Moyne were altered to 1 & 2BG, receiving saloon-style seating where their restaurant fittings had been but retaining the three original compartments at one end. 1BG was noted exclusively on Yarram trains from 1971 until 1986, when it was withdrawn, although its traffic history before this period is not known.

As broad gauge steel cars were converted to standard gauge they received Commonwealth bogies, and their old bogies cascaded to E type carriages. Cars fitted with four-wheel bogies were 1 to 4, 11, 13, 17 to 19, 23 to 25, 28, 30, 35, 36, 38 AE; 4, 19, 31, 34 BE; in addition to Kiewa/1BG, Moyne/2BG, Taggerty, 15, & 33 to 37CE as noted above.

Also around this time, the four air conditioned AE cars (36, 1, 3, 12) were renumbered to 49 to 52BE respectively; the air-conditioned fleet of E type carriages now comprising 4, 19, 31, 34, 49-52 BE; 1-2 BG; Sleepers No.1-4, and Taggerty.

In 1962, 35CE was converted to standard gauge and re-coded to 1VHE (No.1, Victorian, Guard's Van, E type respectively), and it was used as a spare van for standard gauge services until 1969 when it was converted back to broad gauge. At this time it regained its original identity of 35CE. This is the only E type carriage to ever have served on a gauge other than broad, until the preservation era (see Commonwealth Railways' OWB144 below).

==== Post-Standard Gauge alterations ====
In 1966, 30CE among others had new windows with rubber surrounds fitted and the sliding doors to the guards' compartments at each end were replaced with outward-swinging doors. Although 30CE was not the only van to undergo this alteration, it is not known how many other vans were altered in the same way.

The July 1967 edition of Divisional Diary reported that Sleeper No.5, which was then usually reserved for the Commissioner's Special and occasionally used on the Mildura night train, was likely to be air-conditioned in the near future, although this never actually happened.

In winter of 1967, 19AE was removed from passenger service, fitted with curved, wooden hinged flaps around the body, and used to test structure clearances on the Frankston (excepting the dead-end platform at Cheltenham), Gippsland and Ringwood corridors. For these trips it was coupled between vans ZL388 and ZL739, with long-shank couplers either end of the AE and at the cupola ends of the ZL vans. The superstructure around the carriage extended about 15 inches beyond the maximum body length over the corner pillars. The wooden flaps could be actuated by cords through the windows or to the ZL vans. The tests were a precursor to later introduction of the Harris 75ft trailer cars.

From 1968 a handful of Joint Stock cars were repainted from VR passenger red to SAR red/brown. Known numbers are 42AE, 41BE, 42BE, & 27CE.

In 1970, the Victorian Railways eliminated the Second Class category, as part of a modernisation program. At this time all references to Second Class were eliminated; however passenger confusion resulted in new Economy decals being applied from 1972, starting with composite vehicles.

As steel sitting cars were introduced on The Overland, the sitting E type carriages were replaced, withdrawn from service, and condemned. Mail van 1D had been destroyed at Glenorchy in 1923, while the 1929 Callington derailment had claimed earlier Joint Stock vehicles 5AE, 9BE, & 2D. The next to go were 7AE & 8AE, given to the South Australian Railways in 1952 after steel cars 1AJ & 2AJ entered service in their place. The AE pair were renumbered 550 & 551, and painted in the South Australian Railways' livery of primrose & hawthorn. In 1963 the two were sold to the Commonwealth Railways; 550 was never used, and scrapped in 1976. Over the next few months the frame converted to a flat wagon R2604 and fitted with crew camp units S179 & S180; it was written off in 1993. 551 was converted to the Commonwealth Railways' Theaterette Car and reclassified W144. In 1985 it was further converted to OWB144 as the Community Service Car, until withdrawal in 1987. In 1988 it was purchased by the Ghan Preservation Society, and stored at Port Augusta until shifting to Alice Springs; it was sighted there on 3'6" bogies in 1996 and 2008.

In 1959, 8BE was destroyed in a crash in South Australia. The next to be withdrawn were Glenelg, Barwon, 5BE, 40BE, & 43BE from the Joint Stock fleet in 1967, and these were scrapped at Islington workshops, followed by the VR-owned E-type carriages 17AE, 11BE, & 9ABE in 1970. 2BG was destroyed in a collision at Glenorchy in February 1971. 41BE was condemned in 1972 and stored in 1974 awaiting scrapping, also at Islington. Around the same time, 1CE, 2CE, 3CE, 4CE, 26CE, 27CE, 3D, & 4D were all withdrawn, and condemned/scrapped over the following year. 3D & 4D were withdrawn from the Overland but kept in service, occasionally being used on mail trains to and from Port Pirie. When they were finally withdrawn from that service the bodies were scrapped, but the underframes and bogies were retained for movements around workshop sites of beams and other heavy loads; the frame (with floor) and bogies from an unidentified BE carriage were also used for this purpose. The frames are also thought to have been used for beam transfers during road overbridge replacements, until one of the frames was overloaded and folded. A handful of carriages were scrapped from then on to 1974.

In 1970, the Victorian Railways abolished the term "Second Class", and replaced it with "Economy". Carriages of that class were initially unmarked, but by 1972 this caused enough confusion to require marking carriages as "ECONOMY" at the relevant entrances, starting with the composite carriages.

On 12 July 1972, 31AE was scrapped at Newport Workshops. The cedar body was removed and burned, but the underframe and bogies were retained and bolsters were welded on. The frame was then used within the workshops compound, with text painted on the side “This underframe to be used to transport plates between 7 road west and boiler shop for FQX program”. As of June 1972, there was an expectation that on 21 December 1972, all six joint-stock CE vans (1-4, 26-27) would be withdrawn and scrapped after an extended period of storage at Islington.

In late 1973, the SAR restricted the use of E type carriages on regular services, so that when they were running they were limited to 80 km/h (50 mph); the VR applied the same restrictions to those Joint Stock vehicles while running on the Victorian system. This reduced the usefulness of the affected carriages, resulting in 6AE, 9AE, 10AE, 39AE, 40AE, 41AE, 42AE, 6BE, 7BE, 10BE, & 42BE being condemned in 1974. 10AE, 6BE, 7BE, & 10BE were scrapped at Newport Workshops in 1976, around the same time as 40AE & 42AE; the others at undetermined times and locations. 40AE had been sold in 1975, so its scrapping in 1976 is unusual. The frame and bogies from 39AE were eventually sold to West Coast Railway, then when that company folded in 2004 they were on-sold. 42BE was held until 1975, then placed in the Mile End Rail Museum in South Australia. In 1988 it was moved with the rest of the rollingstock to the Port Dock Station Museum, now known as the National Railway Museum.

A handful of CE vans (15 & 30 to 33) had experimental LP-gas heating installed in lieu of footwarmers, along with limited numbers of AW and BW carriages; this new system operated by heating water that was circulated around the vans' through pipes. 37CE was similarly modified in 1978, though its boiler was heated with diesel fuel rather than LP gas. The purpose of the conversion was to speed up turnaround times, supporting a newer, more efficient timetable.

By the end of the 1970s, less than 40 E type carriages were required on a daily basis. Although the figures are guides only, Albury, Cobram, Traralgon and Warrnambool each ran with BE-BE-CE (though to Warrnambool had an additional ABE); Bairnsdale with BE-CE; Ballarat with only 1 BE; Bendigo with a single CE van; Dimboola with ABE-BE-CE; Seymour with a single ABE; Swan Hill with an ABE, a CE and Taggerty; and Yarram ran with only 1BG. Only Geelong had anything more than dregs leftover, with 5 AE cars, 2 BE cars, 2 ABE cars, and 2 BCE cars in service.

=== New Deal and the abolition of wooden rollingstock (1981-1991) ===
With the 'New Deal', major reductions were made in the E type fleet as new N sets were introduced to service, along with service acceleration and closing of many stations around the Victorian network. Carriages in the poorest condition were withdrawn almost immediately, with remaining cars organised into fixed consists; some of those included air-conditioned carriages.

Around this time, changes to the BE fleet coding were undertaken, to better reflect their internal capacity. Cars converted from BDSE in the 1920s became BE^{L}, while cars converted from AE and ABE carriages became BE^{S}. Notably, only a handful of these carriages were re-lettered, although official publications recognised the new codes. However, cars 51 & 52BE were coded back to 51 & 52AE (not reclaiming their original numbers) in order to provide air-conditioned first class accommodation on all Traralgon line trains; it is not known if these cars held the BE^{S} code at all, although it is unlikely. Carriages known to be relettered in this way were 45BE^{L}, and 53, 55 and 59BE^{S}.

Furthermore, all the airconditioned cars received minor improvements. 4BE and 34BE were noted in October 1983 with re-upholstered seating and paper headrests, Pirelli floor covering provided in the vestibules and carpet through the rest of the cars. Taggerty was allowed to operate on all lines from October 1981, as a backup vehicle for when a BRS car was unavailable. It remained in service until 1984 when sufficient BRS cars had been delivered to make it redundant. 33CE was repainted into Vicrail 'teacup' orange, being the only wooden vehicle to receive the new livery.

In 1983, there was an expectation that the two standard gauge trains, the Southern Aurora and the Spirit of Progress, would be amalgamated into a single service and thus free up significant quantities of carriages for the Mildura Vinelander run. This would have released Sleeping Cars No.1-5 from that service for use on the Train of Knowledge, and thus permitted the former Joint Stock sleeping cars No.5-No.10 to be scrapped. However, no firm date was set for this chain of events, so in December 1983 sleeping cars 5, 7, 8, shower car Carey and S type carriage Moorabool were overhauled at Bendigo Workshops, while sleepers 6, 9, 10, power car Melville and dining car Avoca were split across Newport and Ballarat Workshops, for refurbishment. The train was refurbished and re-entered service in May 1984.

Three cars, 16BE, 18BE and 24BE, were sold to Steamranger in South Australia and transferred over on 19 January 1985. These three had been withdrawn, respectively, on 19 December due to a faulty generator, on 28 December the day before set SH31 entered service, and 17 January 1985 after a Sunbury service.

Crew car Goulburn, formerly a dining car, was modified with viewing windows added at one end at the end of 1986, and it was repainted to a special grey and white livery with orange and green stripes on 24 October 1988 for another Royal Train.

The final run of non-air-conditioned E sitting cars came in 1985, after the delivery of the H cars, as 14BE ran in the 7:52 am Bacchus Marsh to Spencer Street pass on Friday, 30 August 1985. This left only the air-conditioned sitting cars, the non-air-conditioned sleeping cars in the Train Of Knowledge, the air-conditioned sleeping cars kept as a backup for the Mildura overnight train, and Goulburn and the Medical and Test Vision car, formerly Wimmera. By August 1989 the count had reduced further when all sleeping cars were withdrawn, leaving only the eight E cars equipped with air conditioning (4, 19, 31, & 34BE; 50BES; 51 & 52AE; 1BG) still in service. Two years later, carriage roster CW9 showed E cars only used on a handful of trips, with 1BG running with leased Australian National K type carriages from Bacchus Marsh to Spencer Street in the morning and return the same evening; a daily run from South Geelong to Spencer Street and return for one AE and five other BE cars, with the second AE kept as a spare; and finally a 'scratch set' replacing a railmotor roster, made up as CP-BE-MTH which ran Seymour and Sunbury trips on weekdays, and Kyneton then return to Seymour on Saturdays.

By 4 September 1986, 31BE was refurbished with new cloth upholstery, carpet and given a fresh coast of blue and gold, joining 3BE, 34BE and 1BG. At the time, 31BE was mounted on bogies SOP527 and SOP528.

Carriages 51AE and 1BG were withdrawn on 18 December 1991, followed by 50BES two days later. The last regular train worked with E class cars was the 5:40 pm V/Line South Geelong service on 24 December 1991, after which 52AE-4BE-19BE-31BE-34BE were withdrawn. After this date, only the Medical and Test Vision Car and 1BG remained in use; the former only until 1992 when local doctors were used in lieu of the dedicated railway service, and 1BG was converted to be used in testing of a new safeworking system with locomotive T378 between Ballarat and Geelong. Goulburn remained on the books, being fitted with through-cabling for head-end power in April 1991 at Bendigo, but it was rarely used and allocated to Steamrail in 1994.

Code	Set No.	From	To	Car F	Car E	Car D	Car C	Car B	Car A (East end)	Capacity	Weight	Length	Changes to achieve	Notes
E	Informal	1988	1988		1BG	50BE	31BE	52AE	293CP					
E	Informal					19BE	31BE	34BE	51AE					Often ran with CD van.
E	Informal					4BE (?)	1BG (?)	50BE (?)	52AE					Order of BE/BG cars uncertain. Often ran with CD van.

The first informal E set - 19BE-31BE-34BE-51AE - was sandwiched between van 7CD and Norman for a trip to Albury on Sat 14 November 1987, celebrating the 50th anniversary of the Spirit of Progress.

=== Preservation era (1991-current) ===
1BG was retained by the Public Transport Cooperation for testing of new safe working systems. The other seven sitting cars were withdrawn and stored, along with Wimmera when it was decided to use local doctors rather than running the medical and vision test train. Goulburn was kept in service but saw little to no regular use, and in 1994 it was allocated to Steamrail. Otherwise, by the 1990s the only E type carriages still of any relevance to V/Line Passenger were of the Classic Carriage fleet; 2AE, 30AE and Yarra.

In 1989, carriages 2AE, 30AE, 1BE, 14BE, 3BCE, & Yarra were listed as restored to the dark red with yellow dots scheme by the Seymour Loco Steam Preservation Group, with 26BE a potential addition to the consist.

By the early 1990s, V/Line declared no interest whatsoever in the wooden carriages. As listed above, the E type cars have been dispersed among various preservation groups and private owners.

91 E type carriages remain, around half statically preserved and the rest either operational or undergoing restoration. Going back to the 1910 codes, 9 AE cars survive along with 5 ABE cars, 25 BE cars, 8 BDSE cars, 7 CE vans, 1 D van, 11 Sleeping cars, Wimmera, Goulburn, Campaspe, Yarra, and State Car No.4.

Additionally, 16BE has been restored as a café at Seville - www.worldisround.com/articles/376216/photo7.html.

==== Seymour Railway Heritage Centre ====
Seymour Railway Heritage Centre is responsible for the following cars: 2AE, 30AE, 5ABE, 16ABE, 1BE, 14BE, 3BCE, State Car No.4, & Parlor Car Yarra.

1BG was transferred from Ballarat to Seymour in early 1998 for storage, having previously been used for Alternative Safe Working (ASW) testing.

==== Steamrail Victoria ====
Steamrail Victoria is responsible for the following cars: 12AE, 3ABE, 7ABE, 4BE, 17BE, 25BE, 38BE, 46BE, 1BCE & 18CE.
