= Victorian Railways V type carriage =

Type of railway carriage

The V type carriages, introduced from 1897, were the first group of Victorian Railways passenger rolling stock to have their own distinct class.

Despite what some records suggest, they were never "doubled" to reflect their bogies. For example, the class AV^{AV} never existed.

== AV ==
AV type carriage
- Manufacturer: Victorian Railways
- Family name: V-series
- Constructed: 1897–1899
- Operator: Victorian Railways

Specifications
- Car length: 50 ft 2 in (15.29 m)

In the closing years of the 19th century, the Victorian Railways found itself in need of more passenger carriages.

In 1897, a design was settled upon, and carriage AV285 was constructed. The number 285 was a follow-on from the numbering of the AA class of carriages, the last of those having been 284. The "V" indicated that the carriage was of a vestibule design, with a walk-through connection to the next carriage.

The new carriage was 50 feet 2 inches (15.29 m) long, and the internal layout was similar to the later E, W and S carriages, having compartments connected by a side corridor. It was the first passenger carriage to include toilets, which were becoming more important, given the longer journeys that could be undertaken by then.

The arrangement featured six compartments with a vestibule and lavatory at each end of the carriage. The central four compartments could each take six first-class passengers in a 3+3 arrangement, and the outer compartments had a three-seat bench on the inner side and a single-seat bench on the outer side of the compartment to make room for the inset lavatory accessible from the end of the car. This gave a net capacity of 32 seated passengers, including 10 smoking and four ladies. Looking from the ladies' end to the smoking end, the corridor would be on the left.

With the trial judged a success, construction of carriages 286 and 287 was continued. However, all three cars were renumbered to the AV1-3 series prior to service. By 1898, cars AV 1-7 were all in revenue service, and they were joined by AVs 8-35 by the end of 1899.

Cars 23 and 32 AV had an altered construction, with doors 2 and 5 on each side removed, and the space replaced with wider windows. That allowed for two regular compartments in the middle of each carriage, with the outer ends being used as saloons. The saloon compartments featured a single-seat bench at the end, four movable chairs, and a three-seat bench towards the centre of the carriage, giving a total capacity of 28 seats in 32AV. 23AV is recorded as having 30 seats, although that is not reflected in the diagram.

Some of the carriages were used as "joint stock", for running between Melbourne and Adelaide on the Intercolonial Express, and entered that service directly from the production line. The symbol O^{A} class was painted on their frames, although that was never officially recorded. O^{A}s 31, 32, 34 and 35 were AV 31, 26, 5 and 11 in that order. The cars returned to their AV designations in about 1907.

Cars AV 21 and 23 also had some role in Melbourne-Adelaide services, but it is not known whether they were ever recoded.

The carriages were kept in service until the early 1960s, being withdrawn and scrapped between 1962 and 1970. However, a handful of them were retained, with some being converted for use in the Display Train (see below), and others for heritage operations.

== BV ==
BV type carriage
- Manufacturer: Victorian Railways
- Family name: V-series
- Constructed: 1898–1899
- Operator: Victorian Railways

In parallel with the production of the AV class, second-class vehicles were also constructed. The same dimensions and general layout were used, with construction being carried out in 1898 and 1899. A total of 25 vehicles were built, numbered from BV1 to BV25.

Again, joint stock vehicles were drawn from the class. O^{B}s 33 and 36 were converted from BV's 23 and 6 respectively. However, they were never officially recorded as being O^{B} class.

The last use of the class was during the final run of R766 as a coal burner from Melbourne to Ballarat on 19 December 1999, with 18BV included in the consist.

Steamrail Ballarat intended to restore a number of the cars to active heritage status and, to that end, 7BV was fitted with a kiosk in one of the compartments.

== CV, DV ==
CV vans
- Manufacturer: Victorian Railways
- Built at: Newport Workshops
- Constructed: 1898 & 1906
- Entered service: 1898-1984
- Number built: 7
- Number preserved: 1, 5 & 7
- Number scrapped: 4
- Design code: DV, CV
- Fleet numbers: 1-7
- Capacity: 10 LT 0 cwt 0 qtr (10.16 t)
- Operator: various heritage operators

Specifications
- Car body construction: Timber
- Car length: 50 ft 2 in (15.29 m) over body; 53 ft 3 1/4 in (16.24 m) over pulling lines
- Width: 9 ft 6 in (2.90 m) (1 & 2) 9 ft 0 3/8 in (2.75 m) (3 to 7)
- Height: 12 ft 9 3/4 in (3.91 m)
- Maximum speed: 70 mph (113 km/h)
- Weight: 24 LT 7 cwt 0 qtr (24.74 t) unloaded (1 & 2) 24 LT 11 cwt 0 qtr (24.94 t) unloaded (3 to 7)
- Axle load: 6 LT 1 cwt 3 qtr (6.19 t) unloaded (1 & 2) 6 LT 2 cwt 3 qtr (6.24 t) unloaded (3 to 7)
- Bogies: W type at 35 ft 0 in (10.67 m) centres
- Braking system: Westinghouse air brakes
- Coupling system: Autocoupler
- Track gauge: 5 ft 3 in (1,600 mm)

Usually, when the Victorian Railways developed a new type of passenger car, they also produced a matching guards van. The V series was no different, with DV1 and DV2 being constructed in 1898.

The vans were fitted with guard's compartments at each end, and had a large baggage area in the centre. Vans 1 and 2 had small side projections known as "duckets", which were used by the guard to view the side of the train through narrow windows. That was in lieu of the more usual raised observation compartments, so CV 1 and 2 were unique for their era in having flat roofs.

In 1906, the class was increased, with DV3 to DV7 brought into service. None of those vans had duckets, instead being fitted with the usual raised observation areas. Those vans also had three double-doors per side rather than two.

In the 1910 recoding, the DV class was recoded to CV, but the numbers were unchanged. The class outlasted the AV and BV passenger carriages by about two decades, with all vans still in service in 1980. Over time, the class had their timber sides replaced with steel sheeting, and vans 3 to 7 had their louvres replaced with flat panels. Otherwise, they remained in as-built condition for most of their lives.

The CV vans were converted from screw to automatic couplers in or around 1960, with 1 and 3CV both altered by 8 July 1960, then 6CV by 1 August 1960.

== State Car 2 (Alexandra/Melville) & State Car 3 (Edward/Carey) ==
State Car 2 Alexandra, later Melville State Car 3 Edward, later Carey
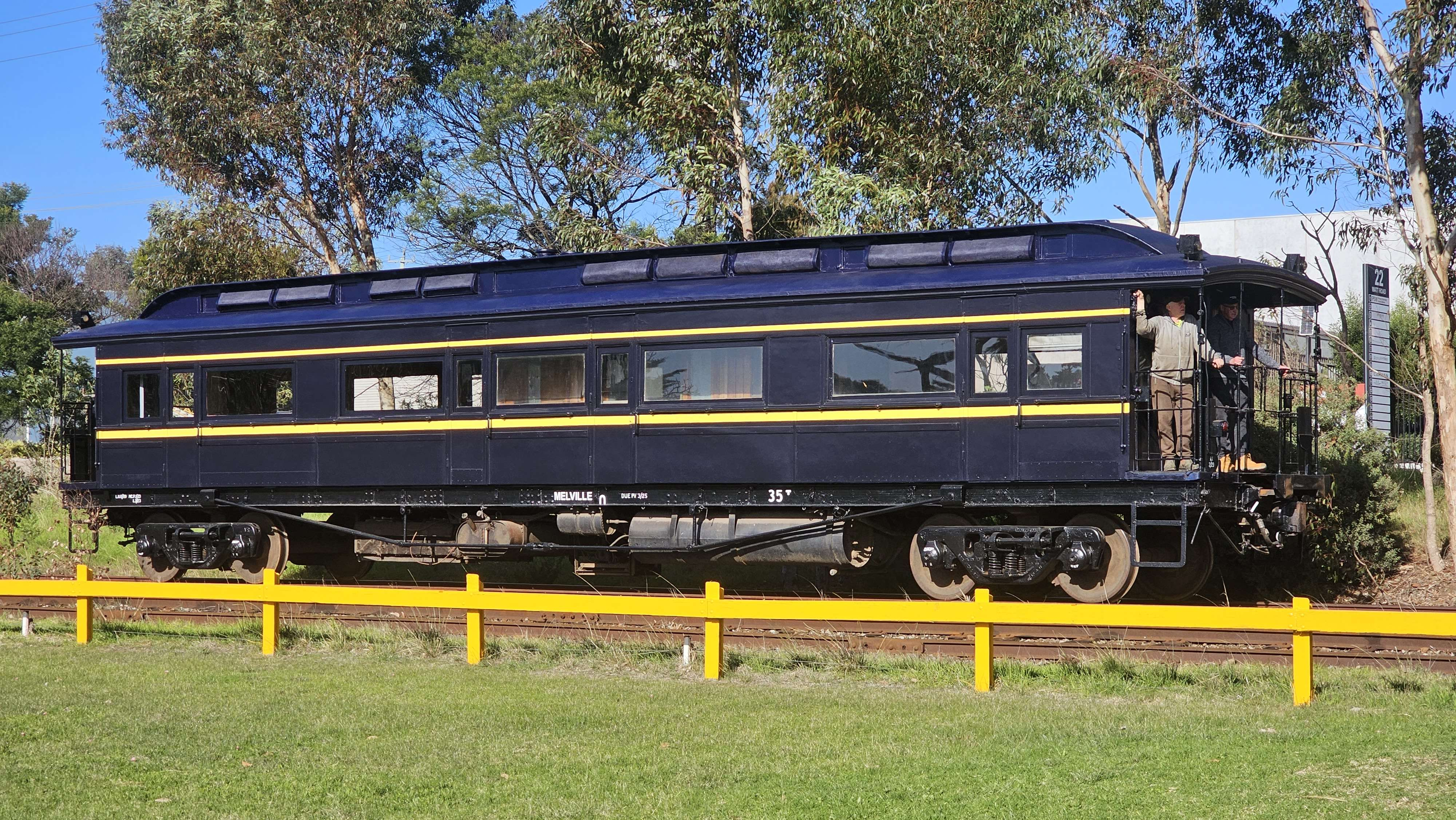
- Melville, as preserved by the Mornington Tourist Railway, 2023
- Manufacturer: Victorian Railways
- Built at: Newport Workshops
- Family name: V-series
- Constructed: 1901
- Refurbished: 1919
- Scrapped: 1961 (Carey)
- Number built: 2
- Number preserved: 1
- Number scrapped: 1
- Capacity: Alexandra 16, Melville 34, later 4, Carey 14.
- Operator: Victorian Railways

Specifications
- Car body construction: Timber panels
- Car length: 50 ft 2 in (15.29 m), 53 ft 6 1/2 in (16.32 m) over pulling lines (58 ft 6 1/2 in (17.84 m) for Melville after splice)
- Width: 9 ft 3/8 in (2.75 m)
- Height: 12 ft 10 1/2 in (3.92 m)
- Weight: State Car 2 Alexandra: 24 LT 2 cwt 0 qtr (24.49 t); Melville; State Car 3 Edward: 24 LT 8 cwt 0 qtr (24.79 t); Carey 24 LT 7 cwt 0 qtr (24.74 t)
- Bogies: 35 ft (10.67 m) centres; Melville extended to 40 ft (12.19 m) centres; bogies 8 ft (2.44 m) axle centres; total 43 ft (13.11 m) wheelbase, Melville 48 ft (14.63 m)
- Braking system: Westinghouse
- Coupling system: screw, later autocouplers
- Track gauge: 5 ft 3 in (1,600 mm)

State Cars 2 and 3 were built in 1901 at Newport Workshops, and entered service on 30 April that year. The two cars were based on the existing V type carriage design, with a 50 ft 2 in (15.29 m) body and 35 ft 0 in (10.67 m) bogie centres. The main difference was the roof style, which was clerestory but with curved ends, as would be applied to the later E type carriages. While under construction, official correspondence referred to the two vehicles as Royal carriages. After entry to service, State Car No.2 was named Alexandra and Stare Car No.3 was named Edward. The names appear on the carriage drawings, centred above the window line, but no photos exist of the cars to indicate whether they were ever applied.

The official diagrams issued in the Victorian Railways 1904 and 1908 rolling stock registers mixed up the two underframes, with Alexandra being marked as State Car No.3 and Edward as State Car No.2, and their marked tare weights were also swapped.

State Car 2 Alexandra had two 12 ft 11.375 in (3.95 m) saloons, one either end, joined by a corridor serving two lavatories, a private sitting compartment for eight, and an attendant's compartment with room for three, including a small stove. Four doors were provided on each side, to access the saloons and the compartments (or the corridor directly opposite the compartments). Because of the internal layout, the doors were not uniformly spaced.

State Car 3 Edward had two central saloons of 11 ft 11.375 in (3.64 m) with three chairs and a two-seater couch each, a small attendants' compartment with stove and a gentleman's lavatory at one end, and a four-seater private compartment adjacent to the ladies' lavatory at the other end. The car was accessed via the end diaphragms or the four doors either side, which were roughly equally spaced.

Both cars were removed from Royal Train duties in 1919, following the successful introduction of State Car No.4, based on the E type carriage design, which had sufficient facilities to cover both the earlier cars' roles in a special consist.

=== Alexandra ===
Alexandra's body was lifted in 1919. The frame was cut in half and a 5 ft 0 in (1.52 m) section was spliced into the frame. The end diaphragms were removed and replaced with 2 ft 6 in (0.76 m) platforms, and the interior was rebuilt. The modified car was renamed Melville, and had two 14 ft 0 in (4.27 m) couches with a table and one 6 ft 0 in (1.83 m) couch in the formerly ladies-end saloon, which was extended from 12 ft 11.375 in (3.95 m) to 20 ft 0.625 in (6.11 m). The ladies' lavatory was removed, and the compartments were reorganised to include a small storage closet (2 ft 3 in (0.69 m)) and a conductor's compartment (9 ft 5 in (2.87 m)). The former men's lavatory was made unisex, but split into the lavatory section and a shower section, with the latter only accessible from the former mens-end saloon. That end saloon was fitted with a single bed-chair, and two couches of 10 ft 0 in (3.05 m) and 12 ft 10 in (3.91 m). The latter had to be shifted to access the shower compartment. The four external body doors either side were all sealed but their window spacing was retained, and access to the car was exclusively via the end platforms. In its new form, the car was named Melville.

==== Melville ====
Between 1932 and 1935 the car was leased by Jack Young of Ballarat, who used it as a mobile radio station broadcasting to towns in the region for three to six days. During that period, the car had "MOBILE BROADCASTING SERVICE" above the window line, and "3YB" - the radio station's call-sign - below.

A further rebuild in 1952 saw the long saloon cleared out, with the space used instead for a four-cylinder A.E.C engine and Stones 44/29 T.E.F.C. Generator. The conductor's compartment was rebuilt as a kitchen area, and the short saloon was fitted with two bunk beds and wardrobes.

Through January 1962 Melville was utilised in Flinders Street yard as a mobile charging plant for country carriage batteries.

The car was repainted to Victorian Railways blue and yellow in 1959, and fitted with 50-ton aligned bogies in 1989. It was used on the Train of Knowledge to provide power for heating and lighting, and air conditioning for some vehicles. When that service was withdrawn, the car was allocated to the Seymour Rail Heritage Centre.

In 2018, a proposal to refurbish the carriage was floated by the Mornington Railway Preservation Society, requesting $109,000 for the restoration of Melville "as a mobile showpiece and educational experience". However, the project did not receive enough community support and, as of late 2018, remained unfunded. Despite that, the vehicle was trucked from the Newport Workshops to Moorooduc in September 2018. In August 2022, an extensive external rebuild was started by Mornington Railway volunteers, and Melville entered service with the Mornington Railway in May 2023, painted in authentic VR blue and gold livery, with a reproduction “Train of Knowledge” sign on the end platform. Because the interior has not yet been completed, Melville is only being used as a guards van.

=== Edward/Carey ===
Edward was modified in 1919 and renamed Carey. The ladies' end compartment was removed and replaced by three showers, and the attendant's compartment seat was modified to allow conversion to a sleeping berth. The vehicle was placed on a new underframe, based on the outside-channel construction of a Tait motor carriage, but the car's length was retained. In June 1955, the car was damaged at Seymour and taken off-register. It was noted as scrapped at Newport Workshops on 28 June 1961. The name Carey was reused on a guard's van that was converted to became the new shower car.

== Display Trains ==
When new steel-bodied carriages were introduced in the mid-1960s, the V-series passenger cars were rendered surplus to requirements. Rather than scrapping the fleet, cars AV 22, 4, 6 and 29 were altered to Display Car No.1, 2, 3 and 4 in 1966, without a class, and leased out as a dedicated consist for display and advertising purposes.

The first use appears to have been on the Gippsland Industries Train, comprising all four cars. Later, two were painted yellow and ran to South Australia, New South Wales and Brisbane as part of the Fashion Express and, later still, the set was joined by cars 5 and 6, converted from 9BV and 21BV, with all six sheathed in aluminium.

Early runs of the set were joined by van 32ZF, later replaced by 2CV, fitted with a generator to provide power for lighting and exhibits.

=== The Gippsland Industries Train ===
The Gippsland Industries Train

On 18 February 1966, the Gippsland Industries Train departed Spencer Street station for a tour of the eastern region of Victoria. It was sponsored by the Advance LaTrobe Valley Association, with funding from the State Government and various Gippsland region associations. The set utilised cars 1, 2, 3 and 4, with all internal fittings removed. The shells were fitted with 240vAC power for displays and lighting, along with a public address system that could also be used for background music. Exhaust fans were fitted, the roof relined with pegboard, and the floors sanded and painted a "neutral" colour.

Cars 1 and 4 were fitted with automatic couplers at the outer ends only, retaining their screw-link equipment at the other end, while the coupling arrangements for cars 2 and 3 were unaltered.

When the carriages were completed, the cars were railed to the Gippsland region for fitting-out by various exhibitors, then collected and returned to Spencer Street for the formal launch of the train. After departing from Melbourne at 9pm that day, the train ran to Drouin for display the next day, later proceeding to Warragul, Moe, Morwell, Traralgon, Sale and, finally, Bairnsdale on 26th February. On each day, the exhibition was open from 9:30am to 9:30pm. A total of 30,000 people visited the train before its return to Melbourne.

=== The Fashion Express ===
The Fashion Express

The Gippsland Industries Train returned to Melbourne for storage until August 1966, when two cars and the power van were requisitioned for the Fashion Express, commissioned from the Victorian Railways by the Men's Fashion Council. The train used two of the four ex-AV display carriages, along with the power van, and two support carriages were included, Goulburn and Norman, making the consist self-contained. The ZF guards van and two V-type carriages were painted bright yellow.

The display cars had the words "FASHION EXPRESS" in upper-case italic lettering on the two-tone yellow sides of the car. The ends of the display cars were black, while the ends of 32ZF remained wagon red.

The exhibition train started from Spencer Street station on 11 August 1966, departing at 9pm, touring western Victoria and South Australia, before travelling through the central and north-eastern regions of Victoria. When the set arrived at Wodonga, the van and two V type cars were given standard gauge bogies, and were joined by three NSW carriages: an ACS composite sleeping car (fitted with showers for the trip), an RFV buffet car (with seats adjacent to the buffet replaced by wicker armchairs) and an LHO brake van. The ACS and RFV had been repainted for the service. The train then ran via Cootamundra and Parkes to Tamworth and South Brisbane, returning to Sydney via the coastal areas of N.S.W., then to Canberra and back to Wodonga.

On return to Victoria, van 32ZF was going to be restored to its original configuration, with the generator removed and the colour changed back to Wagon Red. However, other records indicate the van retained its generator and was utilised for the Showmobile / Display Train (below), until September 1969, when it was superseded in that role by 2CV and returned to normal service.

=== The Showmobile Train ===
The Showmobile Train
Overview
- Current operator: Victorian Railways

Technical
- Track gauge: 5 ft 3 in (1,600 mm)

By 1968 a further two carriages - ex 9BV and 21BV - were stripped internally and renumbered 5 and 6, then joined the existing four Display cars as a six-carriage consist. All six cars were then externally reworked, with the outsides sheathed in aluminium cladding, essentially creating a set of billboards on wheels. However the original carriages' external structures were more-or-less retained under the shell; photos exist of some of the carriages with the shell half-removed, revealing the passenger car's original exterior. A year previous, 9BV, 13BV and 21BV were sent to Newport Workshops, and it was speculated at the time that the Display Train consist would become seven, not six cars.

The new Showmobile Train left Spencer Street on 22 April 1968, with internal displays including "children's wear, cameras, film, aluminium roofing and flywire doors, motorbikes, oil stoves, power tools, motor car tyres and other motor accessories, plumbing equipment, spanners, linoleum, radios, tape recorders, electric clocks, venetian blinds, and furniture", among others. The train first ran to Mornington, then to Box Hill, Upper Ferntree Gully, Spring Vale and Dandenong, before proceeding to regional cities and towns via Werribee, Geelong, Colac, Camperdown, Terang and Warrnambool.

The train was later used in different lengths for various displays, including four cars (1-5-2-4 with power van 2CV) to Broadford for the Council of Adult Education in about 1970s, and four cars, including No.1, with 2CV, to Elmore in 1977.

However, for most of its life, the rain was stored at Newport Workshops. By the 1980s, it was obvious the train had limited value and it was withdrawn from service. Display Car 1 was sold privately in Rosebud on 20 July 1982, and Display Car 2 to the Blue Lake Model Railway Society at Mount Gambier on 24 January 1983. The remaining vehicles, 3, 4, 5 and 6, were sold to St George Metal Co., a metal recycling company in Coburg, on 2 February 1983.

== The Vintage Train ==
The Vintage Train
Overview
- Current operator: Victorian Railways

Technical
- Track gauge: 5 ft 3 in (1,600 mm)

Most of the carriages pre-dating the V subtype had been withdrawn by the late 1960s and scrapped, so they were the only carriages remaining that could serve as a "vintage train" for leasing. Remaining V type carriages were not required for daily service and were put aside, intended to be used on specials. The Vintage Train ran from 1967 to 1983, after which the remaining carriages were formally entered into the state heritage register.

As of 1 March 1973, a speed limit of 50 mph to 80 km/h was imposed on the Vintage Train cars and the Yarra Parlor car.

First-class accommodation on the train was provided with AV cars in the group 1, 12, 16, 23 (Parlor), 30, 32 (Parlor) and 35, along with 45ABL, 12BL/Pioneer and 13BL/Enterprise. 12AV only lasted to 1970 and 16AV for only a few months more, but the rest of the cars ran right through to 1983 and all were preserved, except for 35AV, which was written off.

Second-class carriages included most of the BV fleet - cars 1, 3–8, 10–11, 15–20 and 24. They were run until in need of maintenance, then withdrawn and scrapped. The first to go was 20BV in 1967, only a few months after the train had started running. In 1968, class members 10BV, 16BV, 17BV and 24BV followed and, in 1970, cars 4BV, 5BV, 11BV and 15BV were scrapped, as was 6BV in 1973. The remainder — 1, 3, 7, 8, 18 and 19 — were retained until 1981 when 1BV was scrapped. The rest entered formal preservation sometime between 1981 and 1983.

Other cars known to have been included were some BC vans, with one end fitted with dual couplings, because the R Class locomotives — then the most popular choice for heritage steam specials — could not link to carriages with screw couplings. When the BC cars were removed from service, the function of conversion cars was taken up by ABU carriages, about half of which had screw-couplings or dual couplings on at least one end.

== Disposal and Preservation ==
The vast majority of carriages listed on this page were destroyed and burnt as a quick and easy form of disposal. Some were sold as sheds or for cheap housing, and a handful were retained for preservation.

The known remnants of the fleet are:

- 1AV, 32AV; 3BV, 7BV, 8BV, 18BV, 19BV, 12BL (Enterprise) and 13BL (Pioneer) are at Newport Workshops, East Block.
- 4AV near Codrington used for private accommodation along with AE 28.
- 30AV formerly at Trentham.
- 1CV at Ballarat East
- 2CV at Acacia Gardens Caravan Park until late 2023.
- 5CV at Moorooduc
- 6CV was sold privately and, as of February 2019, was listed on Facebook for purchase.
- 7CV was held by the Seymour Railway Heritage Centre for a number of years. On 20 September 2015, it was transferred to Moorooduc for restoration, so that it can replace 5CV on tourist train duties, allowing that vehicle to be overhauled.
