= Train of Knowledge =

- Manufacturer: Victorian Railways

Specifications
- Track gauge: 5 ft 3 in (1,600 mm)

The Train of Knowledge was an Australian school camp on wheels, allowing students and teachers to visit multiple locations around Victoria without having to organise accommodation or transport.

The first run was organised by Macleod High School, which chartered a train in March 1958, taking 200 students from Melbourne to Warrnambool, Hamilton, Portland, Stawell, Bendigo, Echuca, Kyabram and back.

The Victorian Railways operated the train through to 1976. Its successors, VicRail and the Public Transport Corporation, operated the service until 1989, when the service was withdrawn. All the carriages were preserved, and most ended up with the Seymour Railway Heritage Centre, which continued to run tours on occasion until 2004.

== Rollingstock ==
=== Original ===
The train was formed originally with whatever rolling stock was available, but within a few years it had settled to a standard consist, made up to carry between 80 and 90 school children, six teachers and four railway staff members.

As of 1976, the consist used up to five of the six available E type sleeping cars, each with 20 berths, plus the shower car Carey, formerly a horsebox, Melville, a former royal carriage used to provide power for lighting, heating and cooking, 43BPL (a former sitting carriage) used as a classroom; and Avoca as the dining car for the train, with 48 seats allowing serving the whole train meals in two sittings.

=== Refurbished ===
During the early 1980s, the Victorian and New South Wales railway authorities were looking at merging the two overnight standard gauge trains, the Spirit of Progress and Southern Aurora, which would have freed some sleeping carriages for The Vinelander service to Mildura. Its sleeping carriages 1–4 and 11–14 could then be cascaded to the Train of Knowledge, replacing the older sleeping carriages 5 to 10. In expectation of that switch, maintenance of the older carriages was allowed to run down. However, by the end of 1983, the carriage cascade had not started, while schools around Victoria still wanted to lease the train. Consequently, VicRail started a refurbishment program, with cars 5, 7, 8 and Carey sent to Bendigo for refurbishment and 6, 9, 10, Melville and Avoca to either Ballarat or Newport. At the same time, the former buffet car allocated to The Gippslander train, Moorabool, was superseded by new BRN and refurbished BRS cars with buffet modules fitted, so it was used to replace the worn-out 43BPL.

The scope of the refurbishment was to ensure a further three years of operation. Dining car Avoca had its old, reportedly dangerous, gas-fired cooking equipment replaced, ventilation was added to the roof of the car, the deep fryer was removed, a freezer added at the saloon end of the kitchen (in lieu of a small freezer fitted to Melville), and the floor was replaced. The power supply in Melville was upgraded to better cater for both Avoca and Moorabool. Shower car Carey had its bank safe removed, and each shower cubicle had the hot and cold pipes recessed behind cover plates instead of being exposed.

Moorabool was stripped internally at Ballarat Workshops from November 1983, and the former kitchen door was sealed as part of the works, as had been done to sister car Tanjil when it was converted to standard gauge. The car was fitted out as an open-plan classroom, with whiteboards for lessons and a non-slip floor fitted, at a total cost of $200,000. At the time, investigations were made into fitting the car with a diesel alternator as a backup or alternative source of power to Melville. 43BPL was retained as a standby carriage in case the work on Moorabool took longer than intended, but it was finally withdrawn in November 1984 and allocated to the Australian Railway Historical Society for preservation. Moorabool was first used in the consist on 15 October 1984, with a stripped Murray substituting in the intervening period.

The six sleeping carriages were all upgraded. Each had the upholstery and taps fixed or replaced as required, and cars 7, 8, 9 and 10 had tail lamp brackets and tail discs fitted, to permit them to mark the end of the train, matching 5 and 6. Fly-wire screens were not fitted, to make cleaning of the windows easier, but clear glass was installed in the vestibule doors. The gas heaters were removed from each conductors' compartment, except that in No.6 (nominally reserved for train crews), and re-designated as storage areas. Cars 9 and 10 were fitted with pressurised water systems, in lieu of the original rooftop water filling points. Lastly, all six sleepers had their original names restored - No.5 through No.10 respectively returning to Wando, Acheron, Coliban, Inman, Pekina and Loddon.

In addition to the restored names, all vehicles were repainted into a bright red livery, with black underframes and tan roofs. Previously, Carey, Melville, Avoca and Sleeping Car No.5 had been painted blue with yellow stripes, while the rest of the train was in a faded red. The cars entered their respective workshops in December 1983, and the train was reassembled for new bookings from May 1984. The first sighting of the train back in service was Friday 25 May 1984, at Spencer Street Station and hauled by locomotive T407.

A photo, dated 28 September 1985, shows the train with three sleepers either side of the shower car, followed by Moorabool, Avoca and Melville at the west end.

Circa 1988-89, it is known that at least Coliban had been fitted with end-of-train marker lights and a lamp bracket.

== Tour descriptions ==
Students and school staff members were expected to supply their own bedding for fitting to the carriage berths, but much of the rest of the requirements were provided as part of the service. In around the late 1970s, VicRail (as it then was) provided an insurance cover of $1,000,000 against personal injury, included in the cost of the trip.

Post-1976, four Monday to Friday tour options were offered:

=== Tour 1, South West ===
The first tour covered Victoria's western and south western districts, with stops at Maldon and Castlemaine, the Great Western winery, Tower Hill reserve, Port Campbell coastline, Warrnambool, the Grampians, Port Fairy and various Geelong industries. Students were charged $107 each.

=== Tour 2, Central North ===
The second tour covered Victoria's central northern region, with stops at Maldon and Castlemaine, Ballarat with the Eureka Stockade, Sovereign Hill and the Mine tour, Bendigo with the Epsom pottery, the "talking tram", Sandhurst town and Lake Weroona, Swan Hill including the Pioneer Settlement (with the Sound & Light tour), a paddlesteamer cruise, the Clock Museum, the Tyntyndyer Homestead and The Big Grape.

=== Tour 3, Gippsland ===
The third tour explored Victoria's eastern region, running to Sale RAAF base, Bairnsdale, the Buchan caves, a timber mill at Nowa Nowa and the town of Lakes Entrance, along with a cruise to Metung, the Morwell open cut mine, Gippstown folk museum and the Glenmaggie Weir.

=== Tour 4, Central North ===
The fourth tour covered Victoria's upper northern region, with stops at Maldon and Castlemaine, Bendigo's talking tram, Dai Gum San wax museum and Epsom pottery, Swan Hill's Pioneer Settlement (with the Sound & Light tour), a paddlesteamer cruise, the Fairfield Winery and the Clock Museum, the Tyntyndyer Homestead and the Military Museum, and Kerang's Mohair goat farm, Korina bird park and Oakway Quarterhorse Stud.

== Other trips ==
In mid-1987, the train ran at least once into South Australian territory.

== Preservation ==
When V/Line stopped operating the Train Of Knowledge, most of the cars were allocated to the Seymour Railway Heritage Centre. In 2017 the group declared some of the cars in their custody (Sleeping Cars Wando, Acheron and Pekina as well as power car Melville) surplus to their requirements and were transferred to other groups with Wando going to 707 Operations, Acheron to the Victorian Goldfields Railway, Pekina to The Overland Museum in Nhill and Melville to the Mornington Railway. Seymour still has sleeping car Loddon and dining car Avoca under their care as of 2022.

Moorabool was allocated to Steamrail Victoria, Inman and Coliban were purchased by Steamrail in 1997–98 and in 2014 also received shower car Carey from Seymour after it was deemed surplus to their requirements.

The Victorian Goldfields Railway has former classroom car 43BPL as well as Acheron which is undergoing restoration as of 2022.
