= Mornington =

Mornington may refer to:

== Places ==
=== Australia ===
==== New South Wales ====
- Mornington was a name used for Clandulla, in the years from 1900 to 1903.

==== Queensland ====
- Mornington, Queensland, a suburb of Mount Isa
- Mornington Island, an island in the Gulf of Carpentaria
  - Mornington Island Airport
  - Shire of Mornington (Queensland)

==== Tasmania ====
- Mornington, Tasmania

==== Victoria ====
- Mornington, Victoria
  - Electoral district of Mornington
  - Electoral district of Evelyn and Mornington
  - Electoral district of South Bourke, Evelyn and Mornington
  - County of Mornington
  - Shire of Mornington (Victoria)
- Mornington Peninsula
  - Shire of Mornington Peninsula
  - Mornington Peninsula National Park
  - Mornington Peninsula Freeway
  - Mornington Peninsula Nepean Football League
- Mornington railway line, in Melbourne
  - Mornington railway station
  - Mornington Tourist railway station

==== Western Australia ====
- Mornington, Western Australia, the site of former timber saw mills
- Mornington Sanctuary, nature reserve in the Kimberley region
- Mornington Station

=== Chile ===
- Mornington Island (Chile)

=== Ireland ===
- Mornington House, residence of the Earls of Mornington, Merrion Street, Dublin
- Mornington, County Meath
  - Laytown–Bettystown–Mornington–Donacarney

=== New Zealand ===
- Mornington, Dunedin, a suburb
- Mornington (New Zealand electorate), a former parliamentary electorate
- Mornington, Wellington, a suburb of Wellington

=== United Kingdom ===
- Mornington Crescent, a street in London
- Mornington Crescent tube station, London
- Mornington Terrace, a street in London
- Mornington Meadows, Wales

== People ==
- Earl of Mornington, title in the Peerage of Ireland
  - Garret Wesley, 1st Earl of Mornington (1735–1781), Anglo-Irish politician and composer
  - Richard Wellesley, 1st Marquess Wellesley (1760–1842), 2nd Earl of Mornington
  - William Wellesley-Pole, 3rd Earl of Mornington (1763–1845)
  - William Pole-Tylney-Long-Wellesley, 4th Earl of Mornington (1788–1857)
  - William Pole-Tylney-Long-Wellesley, 5th Earl of Mornington (1813–1863), British nobleman
  - Arthur Wellesley, Earl of Mornington (born 1978), son of Charles Wellesley, 9th Duke of Wellington
  - Jemma Wellesley, Countess of Mornington
- Mornington Cannon (1873–1962), known as Morny, English champion jockey

== Other uses ==
- Mornington (ship), a list of ships

== See also ==
- Mornington Crescent (disambiguation)
- Morningtown Ride, a lullaby
