= Narambi railway station =

Former railway station in Victoria, Australia

Narambi
- Looking towards former station site in 2026

General information
- Coordinates: 38.22914°S 145.05842°E
- Owner: Victorian Railways
- Line: Mornington
- Platforms: 1
- Tracks: 1

Other information
- Status: Closed

History
- Opened: 17 June 1980
- Closed: 15 June 1981

Services
Preceding station	VicRail	Following station
Tanti Park towards Frankston	Mornington line	RMSP 16 towards Mornington
Tanti Park towards Frankston	Mornington line	Mornington Terminus
List of closed railway stations in Melbourne
Location

Narambi railway station was a short side platform located near the intersection of Narambi Road and Richardson Drive, Mornington, Victoria, Australia. It was about 800 metres further down the line from Tanti Park Railway Station. The station had opened by June 1980, and served developing housing estates in the area.

Having existed for little more than a year, Narambi station was closed on 15 June 1981, along with the whole Mornington line. Some of the platform materials were later reused in the construction of Mornington railway station at its new site.

For a brief period in 1999, before the new Mornington station was opened, Narambi was the terminus of services run by the Mornington Railway Preservation Society (now the Mornington Tourist Railway), on a reopened section of the line from Moorooduc.
