= Mornington (Yuilles Road) railway station =

Mornington (Yuilles Road)
- Westbound view at the station, January 2014

General information
- Location: Cnr Yuilles Road/Watt Road, Mornington, Victoria
- Coordinates: 38°13′47″S 145°03′01″E
- Operator: Mornington Railway Preservation Society
- Line: Mornington
- Platforms: 1
- Tracks: 1 (with runaround loop)

History
- Opened: 18 April 1999; 27 years ago

Services
Preceding station	Mornington Tourist Railway	Following station
Tanti Park towards Moorooduc	Mornington line	Terminus
Location

Mornington is a railway station operated by the Mornington Railway Preservation Society, which serves as the terminus of the Mornington Tourist Railway. Often referred to as Mornington (Yuilles Road) or Mornington East to distinguish it from the original Mornington station, it opened in 1999 and is located in the Melbourne suburb of Mornington. It is a ground level station, featuring one side platform.

The station is located near the former site of Rail Motor Stopping Place No. 16 (RMSP 16), which was one of five stations that operated on the original Mornington line until it closed to passengers in 1981.

== History ==
A rail motor stopping place on the Mornington railway line between Mornington and Moorooduc, known as Rail Motor Stopping Place No. 20 (RMSP 20), was opened around 5 June 1928. It featured two small passenger platforms on both sides of a level crossing at Point Nepean Road (Nepean Highway). The level crossing was fitted with flashing light signals in 1939, replacing the previous wig wag signal. RMSP 20 closed by 14 November 1939.

The station reopened as Rail Motor Stopping Place No. 16 (RMSP 16) on 12 September 1966 at the same location; it was now situated between Mornington station and Mornington Racecourse Platform (later renamed to Tanti Park station). RMSP 16 remained open until the closure of passenger services on the Mornington line on 15 June 1981.

In 1984, the Mornington Railway Preservation Society (MRPS) was formed with the objective of securing access to the now-closed line in order to reopen it as a heritage railway. It was granted access and operating rights to the line in 1991, but the line between RMSP 16 and Mornington – which was considered to have significant commercial value – was sold to private investors by the Victorian state government. The track and infrastructure at RMSP 16 was removed, with no trace of the platform remaining.

On 18 April 1999, the new Mornington station opened for services on the Mornington Tourist Railway with one platform for push–pull trains. It is located 350 metres (1,150 ft) east of the former RMSP 16 site on the corner of Yuilles Road and Watt Road, near the former Yuilles Road level crossing, which is approximately 1.5 kilometres (0.93 mi) from the original Mornington station. A runaround loop was added at the station at a later stage. Sections of the platform at the former Narambi station were removed to be used as materials for extensions to the new Mornington platform.

== Platforms and services ==
Mornington (Yuilles Road) platform arrangement
Platform	Line	Destination	Notes
1	Mornington	Moorooduc	Operates for tourist services only
