= Langwarrin railway station =

Former railway station in Victoria, Australia

Langwarrin
- Southbound view at former station site in 2026

General information
- Coordinates: 38°10′12″S 145°10′04″E
- System: Closed commuter rail station
- Line: Stony Point Mornington Frankston (proposed)
- Distance: 49.11 kilometres from Southern Cross
- Platforms: 1
- Tracks: 1

Other information
- Status: Demolished
- Station code: LGW

History
- Opened: 1 October 1888; 138 years ago
- Closed: 22 June 1981; 45 years ago

Former services
Preceding station	VicRail	Following station
Leawarra towards Frankston	Stony Point line	Baxter towards Stony Point
Leawarra towards Frankston	Mornington line	Baxter towards Mornington
List of closed railway stations in Melbourne
Proposed services
Preceding station	Metro Trains	Following station
Leawarra towards Flinders Street via City Loop	Frankston line	Baxter towards Frankston
Track layout
Location

Langwarrin was a railway station on the Stony Point line, which is part of the Melbourne rail network. It was located between Leawarra and Baxter, serving the suburb of Langwarrin.

== History ==
Langwarrin station opened in 1888, serving the newly established Langwarrin Military Reserve.

In June 1981, the station was closed after the passenger service to Stony Point was withdrawn. However, three years later in 1984, passenger services were reinstated, although the station at Langwarrin wasn't reinstated.

By 1988, most traces of the station had been removed removed. As of 2026, the only remains of the station is the platform mound, which is located off McClelland Drive in between Tea-Tree Track and the Centre Break track.

Public Transport Victoria announced in 2014 that it was investigating the possibility of reinstating a station at Langwarrin and sought community feedback on three possible station sites, including the location of the former station.

In 2018, the Morrison federal government committed to $228 million in funding towards electrifying and duplicating the line between Frankston and Baxter. The project would incorporate extending the Metro rail from Frankston to Langwarrin, building a new Langwarrin station, and building a park and ride next to the station.

== See also ==
- List of closed railway stations in Melbourne
