= Moorooduc Quarry Flora and Fauna Reserve =

Nature reserve in Victoria, Australia

Coordinates: 38°12′16.73″S 145°06′34.75″E

The Moorooduc Quarry Flora and Fauna Reserve is located in Mount Eliza, Victoria, Australia and occupies approximately 27 hectares of land. There are entrances to the reserve located on Allison Road, Canadian Bay Road, Two Bays Road and Station Street near the Moorooduc Railway Station.

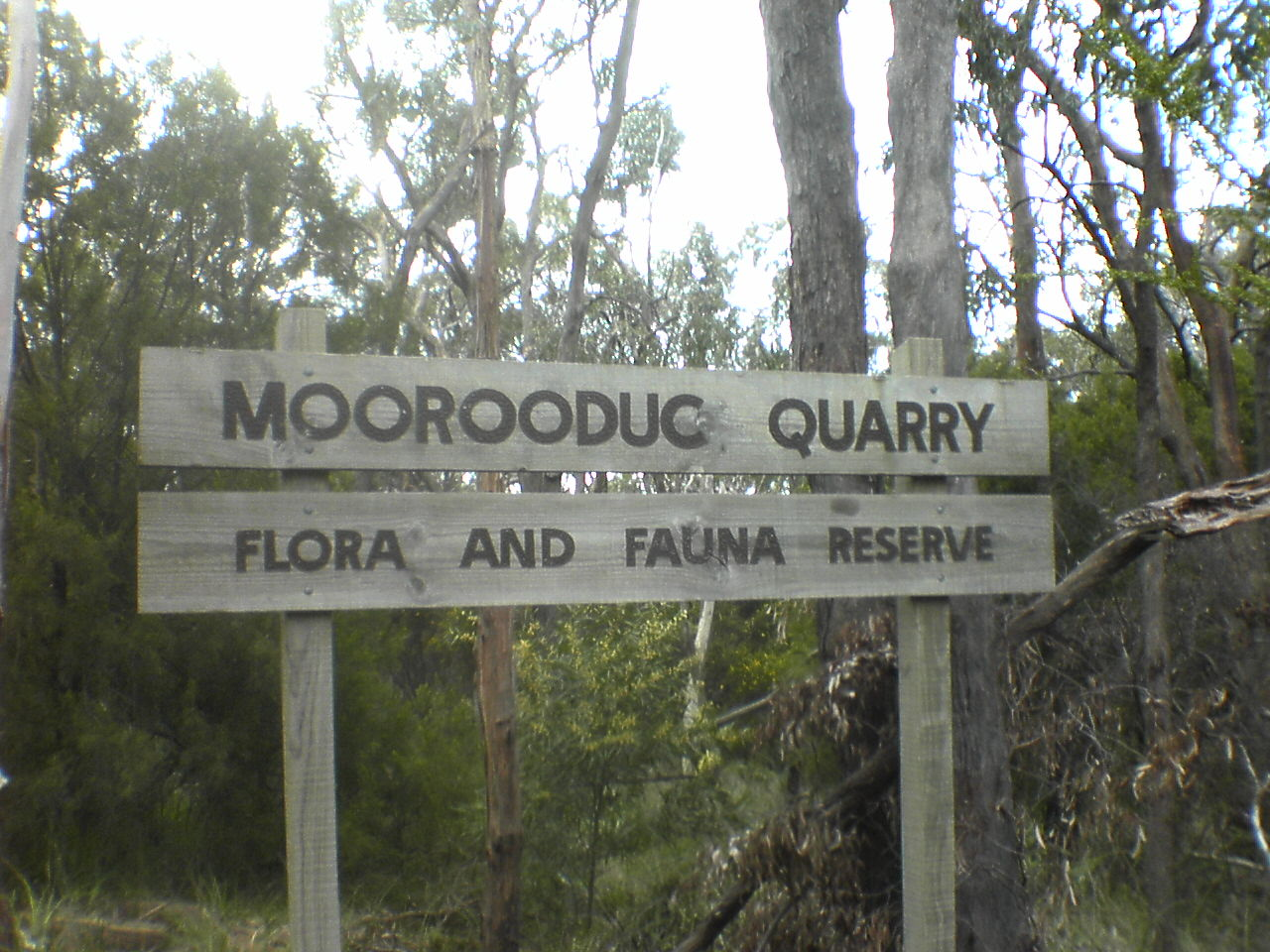
Sign for Moorooduc Quarry in 2005.

== History ==
Rock was quarried using explosives, loaded into dobbin carts and taken to a steam powered crusher. The resulting crushed stone was loaded into larger carts and transported to the Mornington railway line via a spur-line.

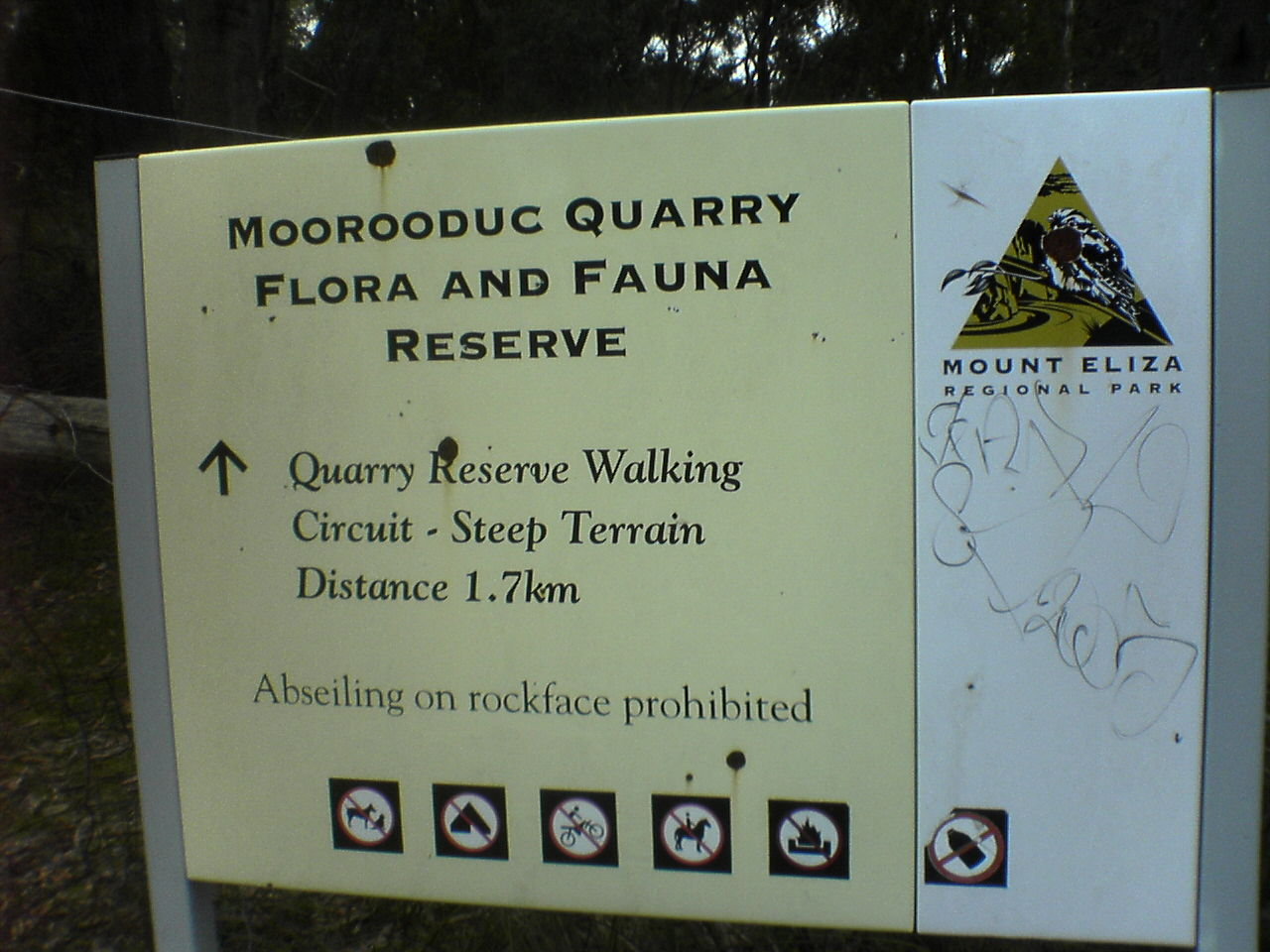
Mt Eliza Regional Park sign for Moorooduc Quarry in 2005.

- 1887 - The Moorooduc quarry was established by David Munro.
- 1888 - A spur-line was built from the quarry to the site which is now Moorooduc station to transport stone and ballast for the construction of a branch line between Baxter and Mornington.
- 1923 - The Frankston - Hastings Shire Council purchased the site. Stone from the quarry continued to be used for ballasting railway lines and other uses including building, road construction and repairs to the Mornington Reservoir.
- 1927 - Electricity was introduced and the steam powered crusher which used local timber for fuel was superseded by an electrical crusher.
- 1932 - Stone from the quarry was used in the construction of stables and garden walls at Cruden Farm owned by Keith Murdoch, father of Rupert Murdoch.
- 1935 - The cartage of stone by rail was replaced with trucks.
- 1950s - Stone from Moorooduc quarry featured in houses built in Gulls Way, designed by David Chancellor and W. Rex Patrick.
- 1961 - The quarry was closed due to flooding. Continuing to fill with water the quarry became a popular swimming spot.
- 1973 - Frankston Council designated the area a flora and fauna reserve.
- 1981 - Some scenes for the television mini-series I Can Jump Puddles were filmed at the site of the quarry.
- 1986 - The movie Frog Dreaming was filmed at the site of the quarry.

After a period of neglect community interest transformed the site into a nature reserve, one of the best on the Mornington Peninsula.

== Current status ==
The Moorooduc Quarry Flora and Fauna Reserve is located within the boundaries of the Mornington Peninsula and Western Port Biosphere Reserve.

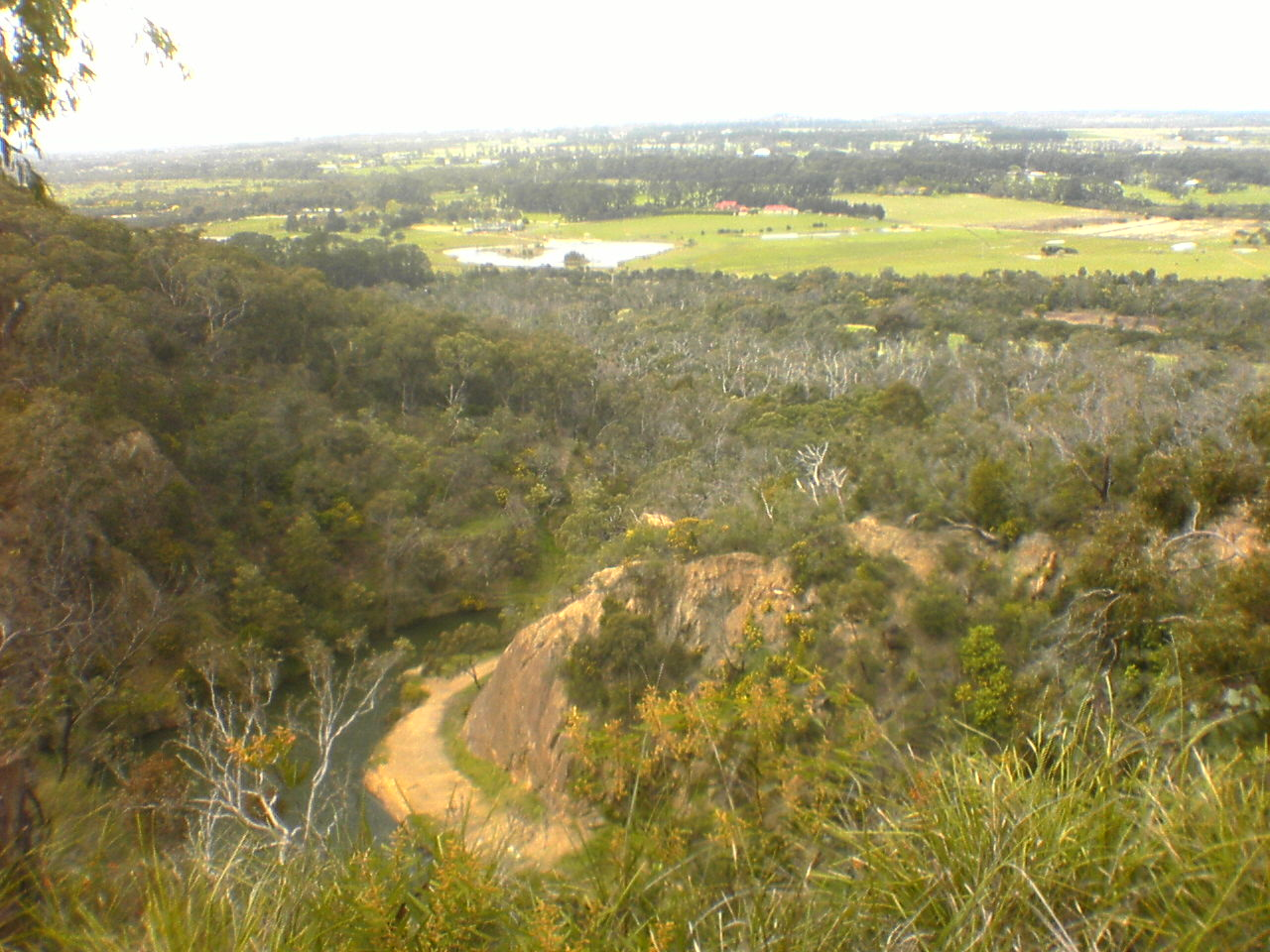
View from top of quarry in 2005.

There are several walking tracks throughout the reserve. One track encircles the high cliffs of the quarry and another the lake at the base of the cliffs. Following the path from Station Street will take you past ruins of an explosives store. Rock climbing and abseiling were quite popular in the reserve but is now strictly prohibited.

The Moorooduc Quarry Flora and Fauna Reserve was submitted for listing on the Register of the National Estate prior to the closure of the register in 2007 but was rejected because it was "not of sufficient significance to warrant entry in the Register."

== Flora ==
Four species of eucalyptus and four species of acacia dominate the reserve. Most botanically significant is the diversity and abundance of indigenous native grasses and wildflowers. More than thirty species of orchids have been documented in the reserve. Several of these are classified as of state or regional significance.

Flora found in the reserve:

- Acacia
- Australian indigo (Indigofera australis)
- Bracken
- Eucalyptus
- Maidenhair fern
- Orchids
- Manna gum
- Cherry ballart
- She-oak

== Fauna ==
At least 45 native species of birds have been recorded as breeding in the reserve and many other species visit to feed or rest. Waterbirds are often seen on the quarry lake. Several bat species have been recorded and infrequent sightings of koalas. The quarry lake and surrounding ponds and dams are home to small to microscopic aquatic creatures and various frogs.

Birds found in the reserve:

- Australasian grebe Tachybaptus novaehollandiae
- Australian magpie Gymnorhina tibicen
- Australian pelican Pelecanus conspicillatus
- Australian white ibis Threskiornis molucca
- Australian wood duck Chenonetta jubata
- Bell miner Manorina melanophrys
- Black-faced cuckooshrike Coracina novaehollandiae
- Brown falcon Falco berigora
- Brown goshawk Accipter fasciatus
- Brown thornbill Acanthiza pusilla
- Clamorous reed warbler Acrocephalus stentoreus
- Common blackbird Turdus merula
- Common bronzewing Phaps chalcoptera
- Common myna Acridotheres tristis
- Common starling Sturnus vulgaris
- Crested pigeon Ocyphaps lophotes
- Crested shrike-tit Falcunculus frontatus
- Crimson rosella Platycercus elegans
- Dusky moorhen Gallinula tenebrosa
- Dusky woodswallow Artamus cyanopterus
- Eastern rosella Platycercus eximius
- Eastern spinebill Acanthorhynchus tenuirostris
- Eastern yellow robin Eopsaltria australis
- Eurasian coot Fulica atra
- European goldfinch Carduelis carduelis
- Fan-tailed cuckoo Cacomantis pyrrhophanus
- Galah Cacatua roseicapilla
- Golden whistler Pachycephala pectoralis
- Grey butcherbird Craticus torquatus
- Grey currawong Strepera versicolor
- Grey fantail Rhipidura fuliginosa
- Grey shrike-thrush Colluricincla harmonica
- Hardhead Aythya australis
- Hoary-headed grebe Poliocephalus poliocephalus
- Horsfield's bronze cuckoo Chrysococcyx basalis
- House sparrow Passer domesticus
- Laughing kookaburra Dacelo novaeguineae
- Little pied cormorant Phalacrocorax melanoleucos
- Little raven Corvus mellori
- Little wattlebird Anthochaera chrysoptera
- Magpie-lark Grallina cyanoleuca
- Mallard Anas platyrhynchos
- Mistletoebird Dicaeum hirundinaceum
- New Holland honeyeater Phylidonyris novaehollandiae
- Noisy miner Manorina melanocephala
- Olive-backed oriole Oriolus sagittatus
- Pacific black duck Anas superciliosa
- Pacific gull Larus pacificus
- Pallid cuckoo Culculus pallidus
- Peregrine falcon Falco peregrinus
- Purple swamphen Porphyrio porphyrio
- Rainbow lorikeet Trichoglossus haematodus
- Red wattlebird Anthochaera carunculata
- Red-browed finch Neochmia temporalis
- Richard's pipit Anthus novaeseelandiae
- Rock dove Columba livia
- Rufous fantail Rhipidura rufifrons
- Rufous whistler Pachycephala rufiventris
- Satin flycatcher Myiagra cyanoleuca
- Shining bronze cuckoo Chrysococcyx lucidus
- Silver gull Larus novaehollandiae
- Silvereye Zosterops lateralis
- Skylark Alauda arvensis
- Spotted pardalote Pardalotus punctatus
- Spotted turtle dove Streptopelia chinensis
- Straw-necked ibis Threskiornis spinicollis
- Striated pardalote Pardalotus striatus
- Striated thornbill Acanthiza lineata
- Sulphur-crested cockatoo Cacatua galerita
- Superb fairywren Malurus cyaneus
- Tawny frogmouth Podargus strigoides
- Varied sittella Daphoenositta chrysoptera
- Welcome swallow Hirundo neoxena
- Whistling kite Haliastur sphenurus
- White-browed scrubwren Sericornis frontalis
- White-eared honeyeater Lichenostomus leucotis
- White-faced heron Egretta novaehollandiae
- White-naped honeyeater Melithreptus lunatus
- White-plumed honeyeater Lichenostomus penicillatus
- Willie wagtail Rhipidura leucophrys
- Yellow-faced honeyeater Lichenostomus chrysops

Mammals found in the reserve:

- Brushtail possum
- Echidna
- Ringtail possum

Reptiles found in the reserve:

- Blue-tongued lizard
- Eastern snake-necked turtle Chelodina longicollis

== Environmental issues ==
Environmental weeds pose a serious threat to the survival of native flora and fauna in the reserve. Erosion is another issue of concern. Regeneration and revegetation works are slowly overcoming this problem.

Pest plants found in the reserve:

- Boneseed Chrysanthemoides monilifera
- Blackberries
- Dandelions

== See also ==
- Frog Dreaming
- Moorooduc
- Moorooduc Station
- Mornington
- Mornington Peninsula
- Mornington Railway
- Mount Eliza
