= Leawarra railway station =

Railway station in Melbourne, Australia

Leawarra
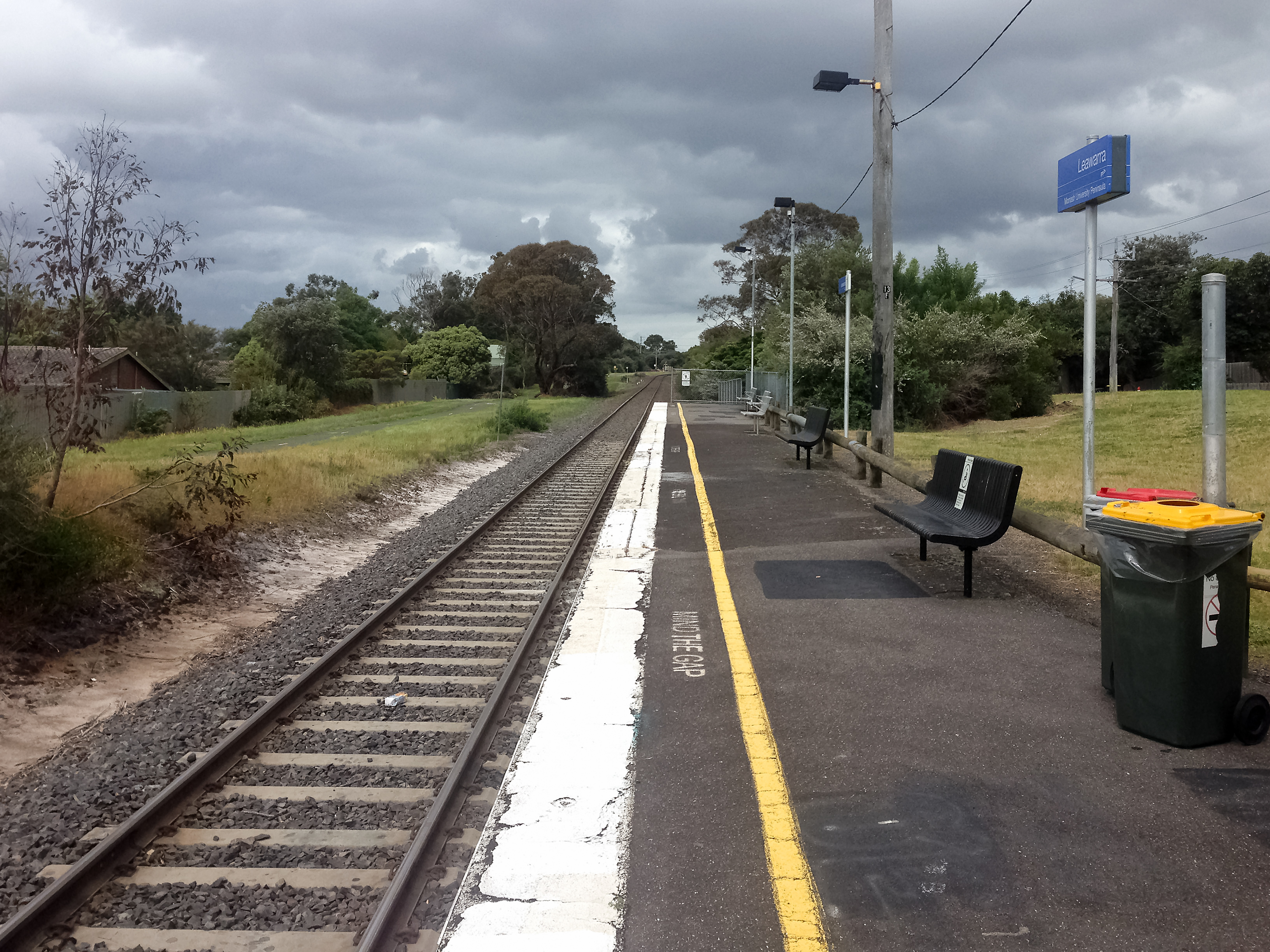
- Eastbound view from the single station plaftorm, October 2018

General information
- Location: Bloom Street, Frankston, Victoria 3199; City of Frankston; Australia
- Coordinates: 38°09′07″S 145°08′22″E
- System: PTV commuter rail station
- Owner: VicTrack
- Operator: Metro Trains
- Lines: Stony Point (currently); Frankston (proposed)
- Distance: 45.77 kilometres from Southern Cross
- Platforms: 1
- Tracks: 1

Construction
- Structure type: Ground
- Accessible: Yes—step free access

Other information
- Status: Operational, unstaffed
- Station code: LWA
- Fare zone: Myki zone 2
- Website: Public Transport Victoria

History
- Opened: 30 November 1959; 66 years ago
- Closed: 22 June 1981
- Rebuilt: 24 April 1961; 27 September 1984; 1988; 2008
- Former names: Railway Stopping Place No. 16 (1959-1962)

Passengers
- 2015–2016: 10,437
- 2016–2017: 11,075 ▲6.11%
- 2017–2018: 10,591 ▼4.37%
- 2018–2019: 10,242 ▼3.29%
- 2019–2020: 6,750 ▼34.09%
- 2020–2021: 4,250 ▼37.03%
- 2021–2022: 4,150 ▼2.35%
- 2022–2023: 5,550 ▲33.73%

Services
Preceding station	Metro Trains	Following station
Frankston Terminus	Stony Point line	Baxter towards Stony Point
Track layout
Location

Leawarra station is a railway station operated by Metro Trains Melbourne on the Stony Point line, part of the Melbourne rail network. It serves the south-eastern suburb of Frankston in Melbourne, Victoria, Australia. Leawarra station is a ground level unstaffed station, featuring one side platform. It opened on 30 November 1959, with the current station provided in 2008. It initially closed on 22 June 1981, then reopened on 27 September 1984.

Initially opened as Rail Motor Stopping Place No. 16, the station was given its current name of Leawarra in 1962.

The station serves the nearby Peninsula Campus of Monash University.

Langwarrin, a closed station on the Stony Point line, was located between Leawarra and Baxter.

== History ==
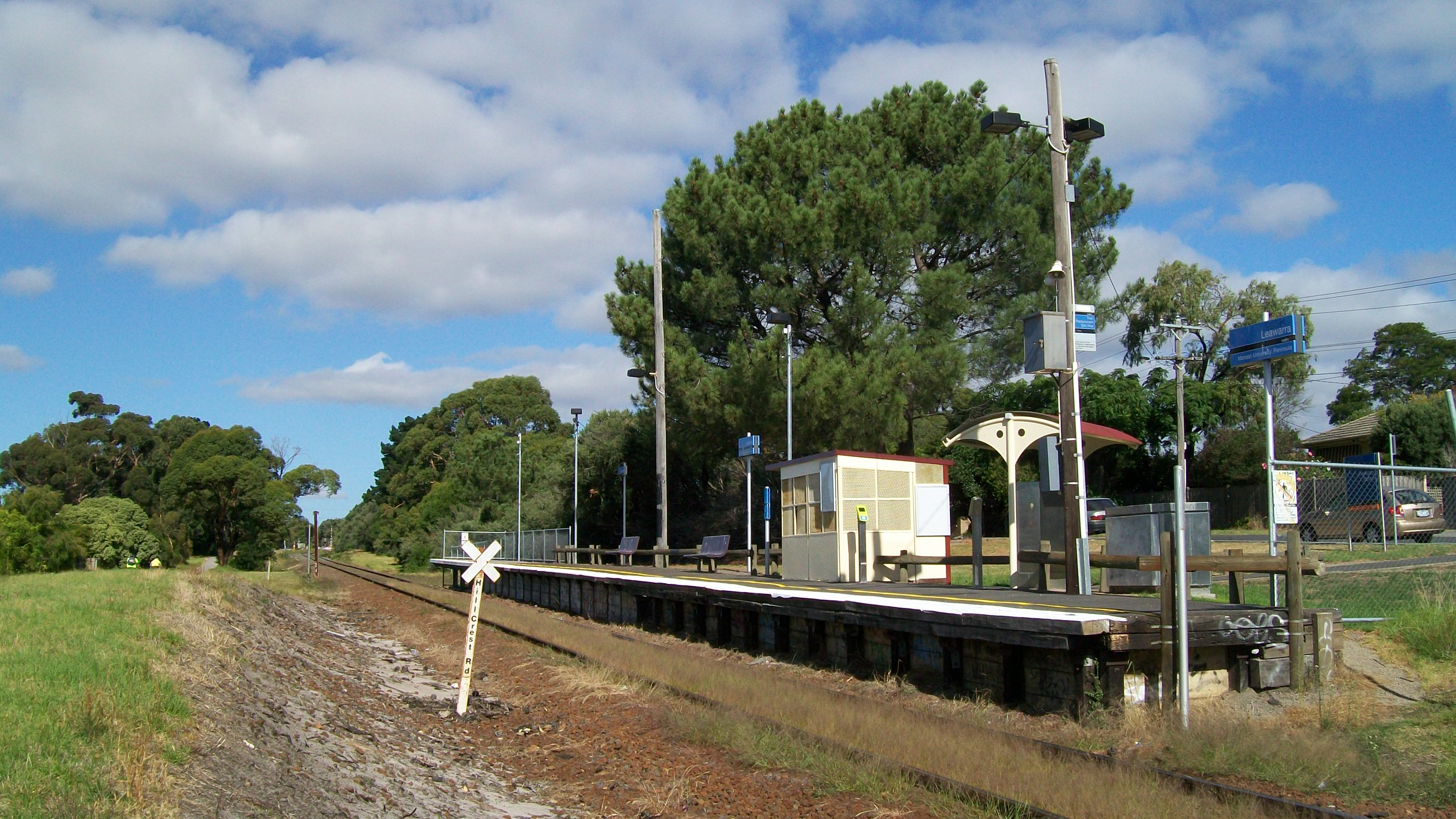
Eastbound view of the whole single station platform, March 2010

Leawarra station opened on 30 November 1959 as Rail Motor Stopping Place No. 16. On 24 April 1961, a 60 ft (18 m) platform was provided to replace the stopping place. The following year, it was renamed Leawarra.

On 22 June 1981, the passenger service between Frankston and Stony Point was withdrawn and replaced with a bus service. On 16 September 1984, promotional trips for the reopening of the line began and, on 27 September of that year, the passenger service was reinstated.

In 1988, the platform was extended to accommodate a DRC railcar with an MTH carriage. Even then, at 44 m (144 ft), it was the shortest platform in Victoria with a regular rail passenger service. In 1989, boom barriers were provided at the nearby McMahons Road and Hillcrest Road level crossings, located in the up and down directions of the station respectively.

In 2008, when Sprinter trains were introduced on the Stony Point line, the platform was again extended, and is now 60 m (200 ft) long.

== Platforms, facilities and services ==
Leawarra has one platform, and is located on Bloom Street, which provides access. It has a small passenger shelter, and a myki ticket machine under another shelter. It is served by Stony Point line trains.

Leawarra platform arrangement
Platform	Line	Destination	Service Type	Source
1	Stony Point line	Frankston, Stony Point	All stations	

== Transport links ==
Cranbourne Transit operates three bus routes via Leawarra station, under contract to Public Transport Victoria:

- 789 : Frankston station – Langwarrin
- 790 : Frankston station – Langwarrin
- 791 : Frankston station – Cranbourne station
