= Tait (train) =

Melbourne suburban electric multiple unit train

Tait carriages
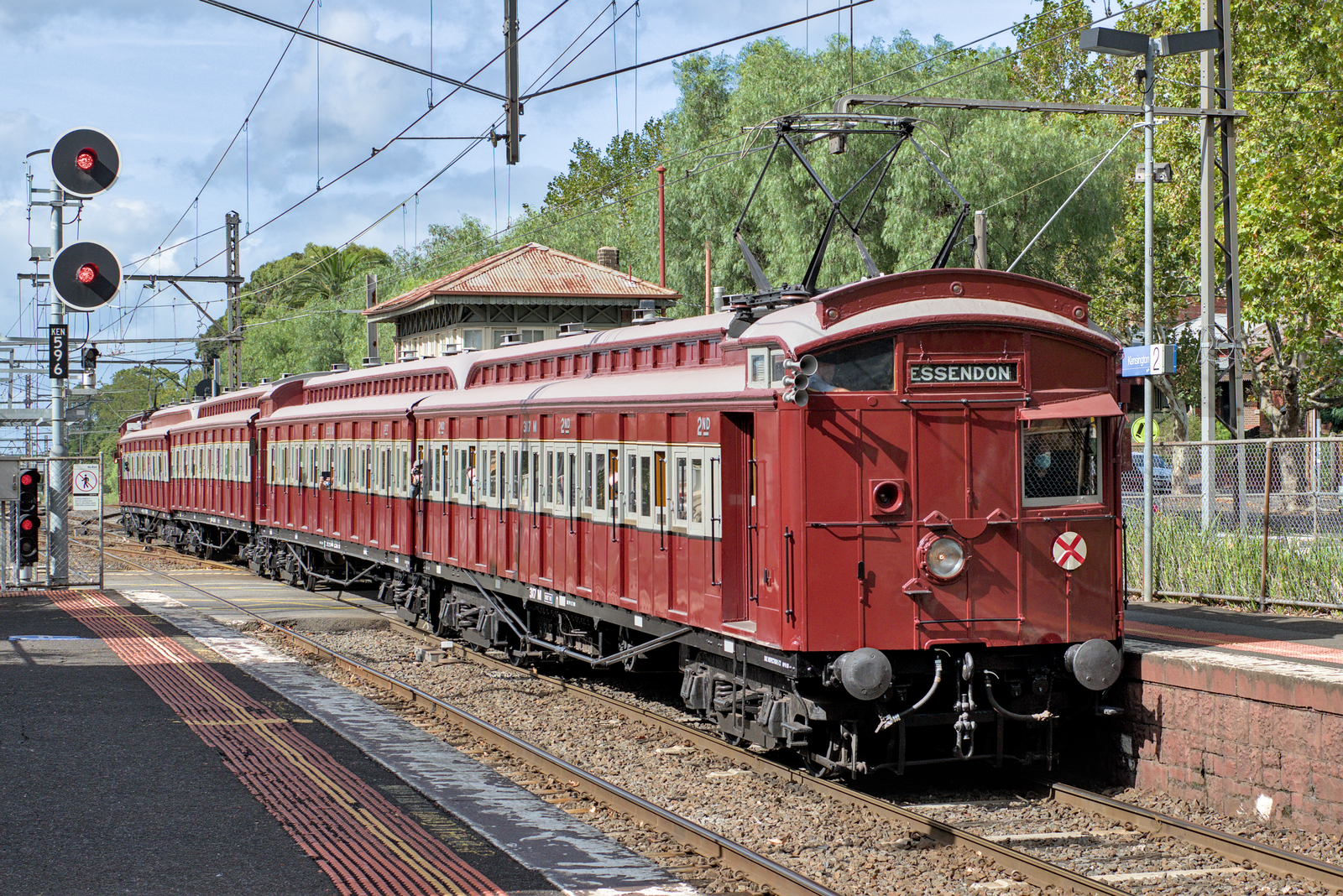
- Restored Tait train passing Kensington station, March 2022

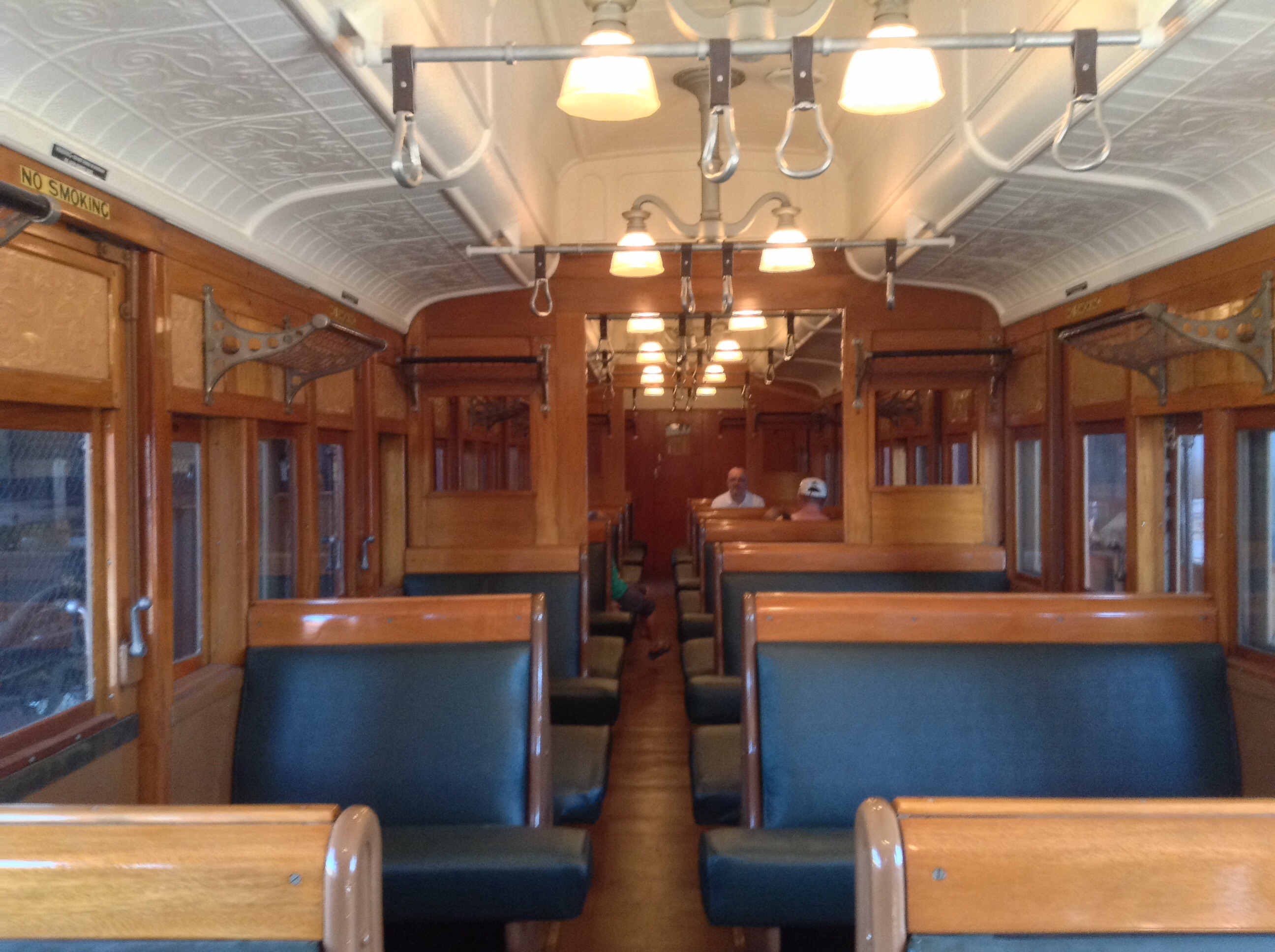
- Interior of a Tait car restored by ElecRail, 2014
- Designer: Victorian Railways
- Assembly: Victorian Railways
- Built at: Newport Workshops
- Replaced: Steam-hauled carriages
- Constructed: 1910–1953
- Entered service: 1910 (as locomotive-hauled carriages); 1919 (as EMU cars)
- Scrapped: 1975-1984
- Number built: 623
- Fleet numbers: 201-461M (Motor cars), 470-473M (double ended Motor cars); 201-265D (Driving trailers), 201-372T & 380-442T (Trailer cars); 1-103G (dual lighting trailers – Gas + electric)
- Operators: Victorian Railways (1910–1983); Metropolitan Transit Authority (1983–1984)
- Depot: Jolimont Workshops
- Line served: All Melbourne Suburban

Specifications
- Car body construction: 59 ft 9 in (18.21 m)
- Car length: 61 ft 8 1/2 in (18.81 m)
- Width: 9 ft 6 in (2.90 m)
- Height: 11 ft 8 7/8 in (3.58 m)
- Wheel diameter: 42 inch (1067mm)
- Wheelbase: 50 ft (15.24 m); 8 ft (2.44 m) (bogie)
- Maximum speed: 70 mph (110 km/h)
- Weight: M cars: 47 LT 16 cwt 0 qtr (48.57 t) (clerestory roof) M cars: 50 LT 4 cwt 0 qtr (51.01 t) (curved roof); CM cars: 49 LT 8 cwt 0 qtr (50.19 t) (clerestory roof); D cars: 27 LT 10 cwt 0 qtr (27.94 t); T & G cars: 26 LT 10 cwt 0 qtr (26.93 t) 201BT: 26 LT 19 cwt 0 qtr (27.38 t)
- Traction motors: Four GE239
- Power output: 105 kW (141 hp)
- Transmission: straight cut gears, gear ratio 73:23
- Acceleration: 0.9m/s
- Deceleration: 0.95m/s
- Electric system: 1500 V DC overhead lines
- Wheels driven: All on Motor carriages (ACPM, BCPM, M & CM)
- Braking system: Westinghouse Air Brake Company
- Coupling system: Screw
- Track gauge: 5 ft 3 in (1,600 mm)

The Tait trains are wooden bodied electric multiple unit (EMU) trains that operated on the suburban railway network of Melbourne, Victoria, Australia. They were introduced in 1910 by the Victorian Railways as steam locomotive hauled cars, and converted to electric traction from 1919 when the Melbourne electrification project was underway. The trains derived their name from Sir Thomas James Tait, the chairman of commissioners of the Victorian Railways from 1903 to 1910. The first cars were built during 1909 with the last entering service in 1952.

Tait trains are initially referred to as "Sliding Door" trains, as opposed to the "Swing Door" trains then in service. From the 1950s, following the introduction of the blue-painted Harris trains, they became known as Reds or Red Rattlers, the latter epithet later being applied to various types of red-painted rolling stock in Sydney.

== Layout ==
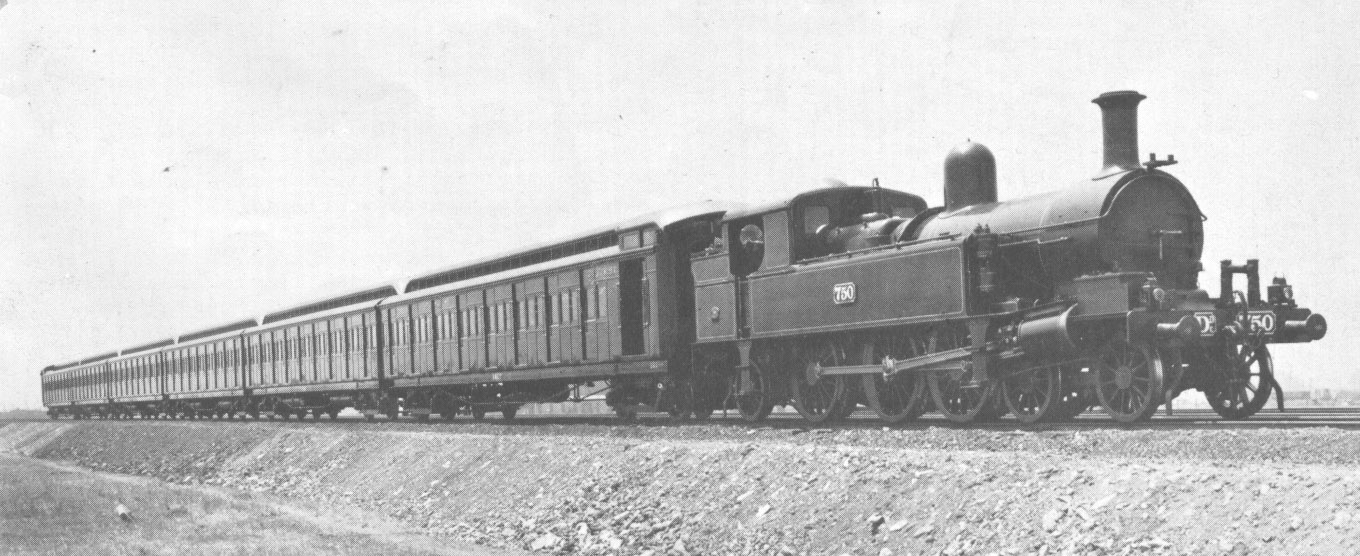
First set of Tait suburban passenger carriages hauled by steam locomotive Dde 750, c. 1910

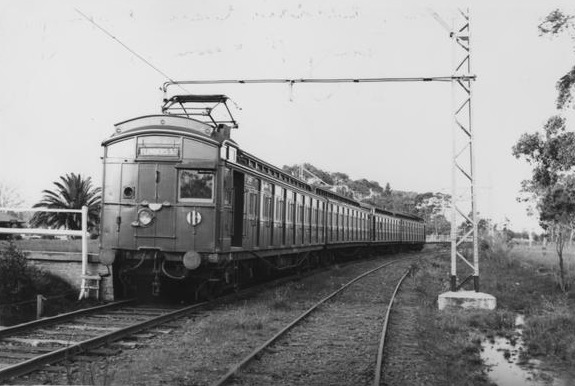
Four-car Tait train at the Spring Vale Cemetery platform, 1938

Tait trains had a partly open saloon layout with transverse bench seats. The saloon was divided by partitions into a number of smaller areas. Each seating aisle was provided with its own exterior sliding door.

Incandescent lighting, a pressed-metal ceiling, luggage racks above head height, and varnished wood-grain walls were fitted inside each compartment. Interiors were split into smoking and no-smoking compartments until late 1978, after which smoking was banned on trains. Carriages were designated as first or second class until 1958, after which one-class suburban travel was introduced.

The exterior of the trains were in two main styles: the original cars had a clerestory roof, and those built from the late 1920s onward had a simpler arched roof.

From 1971, the interior was simplified to cut maintenance costs, with some doorway windows being replaced by metal and plywood, and the wooden louvred sun blinds being removed. The motor bogies on the trains were originally of pressed steel construction, being changed for a new design in cast steel in the 1930s.

== In service ==
=== Pre-electrification ===
The production of Tait carriages began before electrification, with the necessary electrical equipment to be retrofitted when required.

The carriages were grouped as the P type, with codes like AC^{P} indicating that there was a passageway connecting most of the compartments, rather than the older carriage style with each compartment isolated from its neighbours. In the 1910 recoding project, the ^{P} was changed to a normal-size, normal-font letter, i.e. ACP. However, most diagrams show the raised letter with the newer code, perhaps because they were drawn during the construction phase, around the same time as the recoding was being planned.

All carriages were roughly 62 ft (19 m) long over the buffers, 9 ft (2.7 m) high, and 9 ft 6 in (2.90 m) wide, although there was some variation. All compartments were linked with a through-corridor, though internal sliding doors were placed three compartments from one end. The carriages were not initially marked "Smoking" or "Non-Smoking".

==== AC^{P}, A^{P}, BC^{P}, B^{P} ====
Initial construction saw 48 AC^{P} cars, 62 A^{P}, 18 BC^{P} and 62 B^{P} carriages built in the period 1910 to 1913. The A^{P} and B^{P} carriages were of identical design, with capacity for 92 passengers each across nine compartments, except that the second-class B^{P} carriages had lower-quality seating. Similarly, the AC^{P} and BC^{P} cars shared a design in every way other than the seating. Those carriages were fitted with eight compartments for 82 passengers, and the ninth compartment was re-purposed for a train guard, and fitted with a raised cupola for the sighting of signals.

From 1915, more carriages were constructed as the electrification project gathered pace and requirements were locked in. Further ACP carriages 49–106, and BCP carriages 19–80 were constructed in 1915–1916. However, they did not have the standard carriage bogies, but were fitted with plate-framed bogies intended for the later fitting of traction motors. The cars also varied in having a well in the roof designed to accommodate a pantograph. That gives a rough indication of when the decision was made to proceed with a 1500V DC overhead wiring system for Melbourne's electrification, as opposed to earlier proposals to use a third rail.

=== Conversion for electrification ===
Conversion of Tait cars for electrification started in 1917, in preparation for trials and driver training on the Flemington Racecourse line, and later on the Sandringham line.

Some carriages were stored after conversion, awaiting traffic requirements. It is thought that those vehicles were held until around 1919/1920.

The converted carriages kept their existing codes, but with D, M or T appended, indicating Driver's compartment, Motor car (with the driver's compartment) or Trailer. However, in 1921, the system was regarded as too complex, and coding was simplified, with all motored and driving carriages becoming second class, and all trailers becoming first class.

The conversion program was completed in 1922.

==== Driving motors—ACPM, BCPM, M ====
From 1917 through to 1921, ACP and BCP carriages were withdrawn from steam service in preparation for electrification. The carriages which were fitted with traction motors had been built with that in mind, having heavier underframes, bogies designed to support the motors, and a well in the roof to allow a pantograph to be fitted.

Seventeen of the ACP 49–106 range were recoded to ACPM. From 1916 on, a further 26 ACPM cars were built, bringing the fleet to 45. However, the entire class was recoded M in 1921, being given numbers 201M to 284M.

Similarly, 28 of the BCP cars in the range 19–80 were recoded to BCPM and, in 1916, the class grew by 30 units. In the 1921 renumbering, the ex-BC^{P}/BCPM class became 294M-385M.

Additional M cars, 285–293 and 386–411, were built new in 1922. Further cars, with curved roofs, were built in 1925 and 1926, taking numbers 412M–441M. 442M and 443M were rebuilt from 18M and 44M, former Swing-door motors. Those cars ended up having the thinner Swing-door underframe with the larger Tait body, giving them a rather unbalanced look. The carriages entered service in 1936. Following that, 444M through 461M were built in the period 1944–1949, and the last of them entered service in 1951.

In 1968, four motors, 300M, 398M, 244M and 397M were modified to include driving cab at both ends, taking on new numbers 470M–473M. They were mainly used on the Eltham to Hurstbridge and the Alamein lines, where even a two-car set could not be justified at off-peak times.

In 1979, the deliveries of the new Hitachi fleet were catching up with the Tait numbering block, so some carriages were renumbered, using numbers that were not in use. That started with the gap 462M–469M and 474M–499M, and later cars took numbers of Tait motor cars previously scrapped. By 1983, deliveries of the Comeng fleet made even that measure insufficient, so the 19x remaining Motors had the prefix "1" added to their numbers: e.g. 383M became 1383M.

==== Parcel motors CM ====
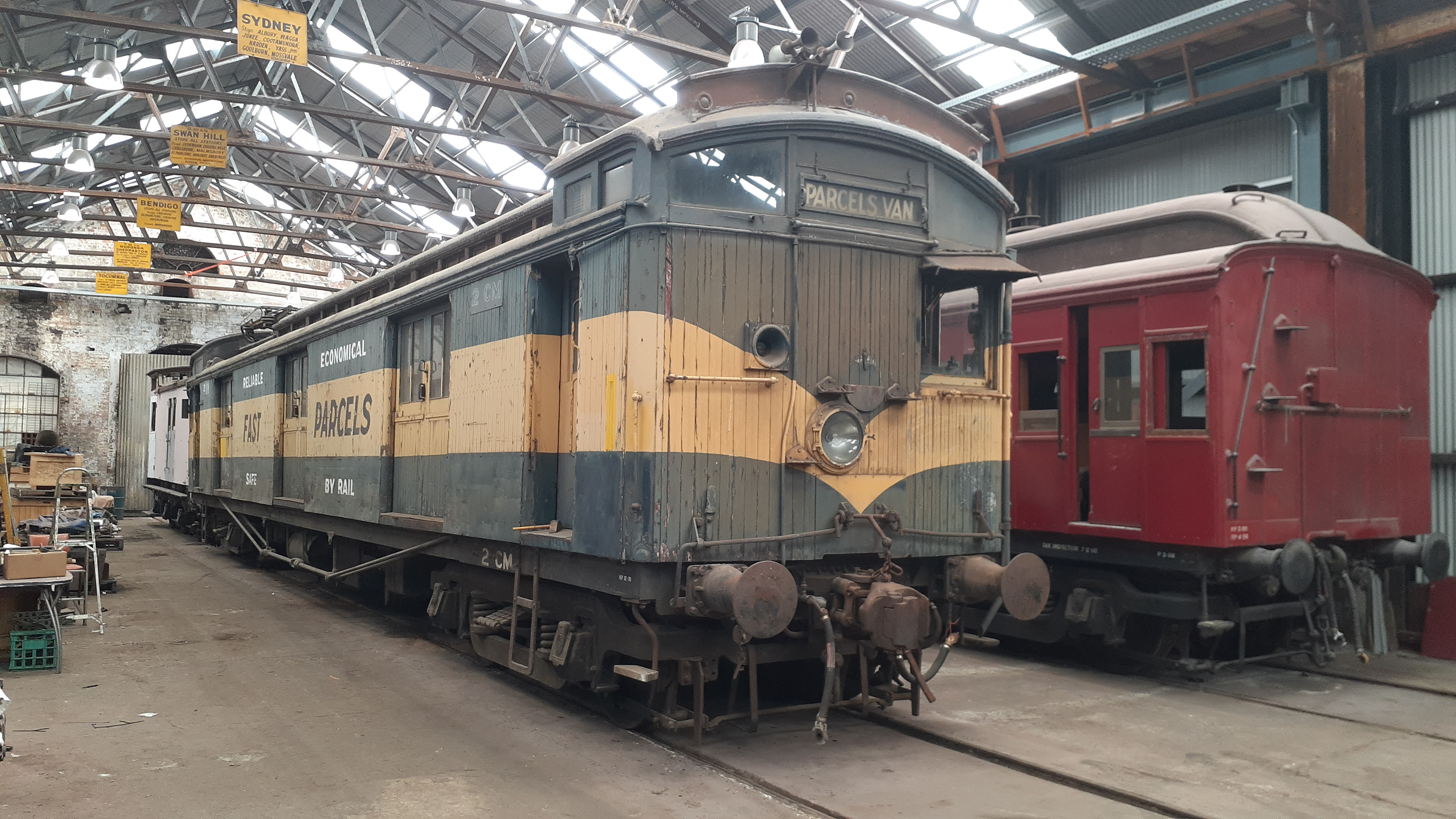
Parcel motor 2CM stored at Newport Workshops, 2022

In 1921, a decision was made to supplement the mail/newspaper distribution fleet with double-ended motor cars, having the interior of a typical bogie guards' van of the CE/CW/CV types.

Coaches 1CM and 2CM entered service in 1921, with a capacity of 25 tons each. In 1923, they were joined by a third vehicle, 3CM. That was partially paid for by the Electrical Engineering Branch, with a modified design featuring a centre cupola for viewing of the overhead wires. 3CM was run with the normal fleet, but was made available for overhead wire inspection if and when required. CMs 4 and 5 entered service in 1925 and 1926 respectively, both using the new arch/curved roof style between their two cupolas. This roof style was derived from the then-recently built vans 16-20CW.

The fleet was used for cash transport, and as a staff-only taxi service for the use of crew members scheduled to start work between 3 am and 5 am (before the regular services started operating).

Extra coaches were built from the mid-1950s using former Swing Door carriages.

The parcels coach traffic dried up in 1988 when a railways' policy change saw a switch to road transport. Correspondence to stations is now delivered on a few select trains per week, noted in advance.

The last seven parcels vans were withdrawn as a group on 7 January 1986. This followed Australia Post abandoning the railways and introducing a fleet of four prime-movers and six pantechnicon semi-trailers to cover the Melbourne-Sydney route, in lieu of the rail service. That change was expected to save Australia Post about A$500,000 and cost V/Line about A$350,000 per year. The Australian Railways Union were not happy with the cancellation, but V/Line reported that the parcel coaches were "too expensive to replace and the service was too slow" compared to what was being achieved with V/Line's own fleet of road vans.

As at September 1987, 1CM was shortly due to be scrapped at Newport Workshops, while 2CM and 5CM had been set aside for preservation and were stored in the Collingwood Sidings just east of Flinders Street station. 3CM was believed to have been the first withdrawn due to poor condition, but was intact sans pantograph. 4CM was stabled with swingdoor parcels vans 12CM, 13CM and 10CM at Spencer Street station.

==== Driving trailers—ACPD, BCPD, D ====
When planning the initial electrification project, it was expected that some lines could be operated with single-carriage or two-carriage trains instead of requiring a full consist. The single-carriage, double-ended motors were sourced from the Swing Door fleet, although some Driving Trailer carriages were sourced from the Tait fleet. While it was initially thought that around twenty of those carriages would be needed for service, only eleven were converted in the early stages of the electrification project.

In the first half of 1921, six AC^{P} carriages (16–17, 23, 92–93 and 52) and five BC^{P} carriages (2–3, 8–9 and 18) were rewired and recoded with a "D" appended. New identities for the ACPD series were 1–2, 8, 10–12, while the BCPD cars kept their old numbers of 2–3, 8–9 and 18.

In 1922, following the simplification of the classification system, the last of the three ACPD cars were converted to M motorised carriages 244, 245 and 204 in 1922. They had previously been heavier-underframe carriages. The remaining eight driving trailers were recoded to D 201–202 and 208 (ex ACPD) and 211, 204–207 (ex BCPD) respectively. Further conversions direct from AC^{P} and BC^{P} carriages saw the class rise to eighteen D carriages, numbered 201–218.

In 1940, carriage 244T, originally 44A^{P}, was converted to driving trailer 225D. Following World War II, both 202D and 225D underwent further rebuilding, fitted with semi-elliptical roofs, larger torpedo ventilators, and reconfigured first-class seating.

==== "Ringer" Trailers, T ====
The 48 lighter-framed AC^{P} and BC^{P} carriages not converted to driving trailers were known as "Ringer" trailer cars. The guard's compartment equipment was removed and the larger area was made available to passengers, often being used by those with prams or extra luggage. The compartment was identifiable by the lack of the word "GUARD", and a white circle painted on the door. The circle indicated to crew members that the vans were not fitted with a handbrake or emergency brake taps, normally found in carriages with the raised-profile roof of the guards' compartment.

The Ringer trailers had formerly been AC^{P} 15, 19–22, 24–48 and BC^{P} 1, 4–7 and 121–133 (ex. AC^{P} 1–13). They took the number range 263T to 286T (ex AC^{P} 25–48), 349T to 361T (ex AC^{P} 1–13, later BC^{P} 121–143), 362T to 367T (ex AC^{P} 15, 19–22, 24) and 368T–372T (ex BC^{P} 1 and 4–7).

From 1926 to 1927, the first batch of Ringer Trailer to Driving Trailer conversions were made, with trailers 365 and 368–372 converted to 224D, 219D, 220D, 221D, 222D and 223D.

From 1965 to 1972, all bar two of the remaining Ringer trailers (349T and 350T) were converted to full Driving Trailers and coded randomly into the range 226D–265D.

==== Trailers—APT, BPT, T ====
The plain trailer carriages were converted for electric traction between 1919 and 1922. That involved removal of the then-standard gas lighting and refitting with electric lighting, as well as through jumper cable connections for the driving and motor cars operating at each end.

The T fleet comprised the original 124 A^{P} and B^{P} carriages.

The A^{P} fleet was initially relettered to APT, and the B^{P} fleet to BPT. When the classes were simplified in 1921, only 39 APT and 28 BPT cars had been refitted with the required electrical equipment. Further conversions were straight from A^{P}/B^{P} to T. From 1922 on, ex-A^{P} cars had 200 added to their numbers to indicate the Tait/Sliding door fleet; for example 37A^{P} became 37APT then 237T. The ex-B^{P} cars were renumbered into the range 287–348, keeping the sequence i.e. 1B^{P} became 287T and 62B^{P} became 348T.

Additional carriages were built, numbers T380 to T400 in 1922, T401–424 in 1926, and T427–T442 between 1944 and 1952, with all trailer carriages from T401 onwards were built with semi-elliptical roofs.

As noted above, trailer 244T was converted to driving trailer 225D. This happened in 1940.

288T was temporarily recoded to second class, with a G car's shunting/braking equipment, in 1954.

==== Experimental Trailer 201BT ====
As a testbed for the new Harris cars then being developed, the body of incomplete 441T was reworked to a more modern design and released into service in 1950, with three sets of doors per side. The car was coded 201BT, and lasted in service until 1984.Film 368 – 6/1975Film 490 – 1/1976

Internally, the car was divided into three second-class compartments; the outer two at a little under 17 ft across and the middle compartment at a little under 23 ft. One compartment was reserved for smokers until 1976, when smoking was abolished on the suburban network.

The car went through a number of changes in seating arrangements and door types (and post-76, internal partitions), with seated capacity ranging from 70 to 90 (73 being the most commonly quoted figure) and 164–175 standing passengers in crush load conditions. Initially the vehicle featured three sets of double-leaf sliding doors per side, with 2 windows either end and 6 windows between each set of doors. Later, the outer sliding doors were singled, and an additional window was added to the centre section for a 2-D-7-DD-7-D-2 configuration. Externally, the roof featured a mix of Flettner and torpedo ventilators, with torpedo vents outnumbering the Flettner units, reflecting experimentation by the Victorian Railways with carriage ventilation at the time.

The car was preserved pending restoration as a display at the Newport railway museum, although some believed it to have been scrapped in 1994. It is now stored in West Block at Newport Workshops, for future restoration by Elecrail.

A replacement 441T to the regular design was built and entered service in 1952.

==== Gas-lit trailers—G ====
In addition to standard suburban trailer cars, a project was undertaken to construct gas-lit intermediate trailers (coded G) to supplement suburban transport while providing capacity for steam-hauled country excursions during peak holiday periods such as Easter and Christmas. Built starting as part of the 1923 construction programme following the curtailment of the Swing Door conversion scheme, the first 55 carriages (1G–55G) featured plain side panels, plain ceilings without pressed metal art nouveau details, and traditional clerestory roofs. From the exterior, these clerestory G cars could be distinguished from standard clerestory T cars by their Flettner ventilators. While standard clerestory Tait cars had ventilators alternating from side to side along the roofline, the clerestory G cars had all ventilators fitted on a single side to accommodate the gas supply pipe running along the opposite side, a configuration that remained until the gas lighting systems were removed in the 1970s. Select cars in this initial batch, including 5G through 12G and 14G, but excluding 13G, were constructed utilizing motor car underframes originally built for uncompleted Swing Door conversions. Subsequent construction from 56G through 97G transitioned from clerestory roofs to modern semi-elliptical roofs, although one early clerestory carriage, 47G, was later rebuilt with a semi-elliptical roof. The final batch of G carriages, 98G through 103G, entered service in pairs between 1944 and 1950. Despite being constructed in the late 1940s, these final cars were still fitted with provision for gas lighting to maintain operational compatibility with the rest of the fleet during regional holiday operations.

The G series cars shared a nine-compartment layout seating 94 passengers, similar to the T series trailers (400–424). However, unlike the T cars, which featured three smoking and six non-smoking compartments. The G cars were designated entirely for smoking passengers, configured with four first-class and five second-class compartments. The first-class seating was arranged at the east end and second-class at the west end to align smoothly between second-class Motor and first-class Trailer cars when marshalled into seven-car suburban sets.

During peak travel periods, including Christmas and Easter, the G cars were detached from suburban electric block sets and marshalled into steam-hauled country trains to boost regional capacity, taking advantage of their dual gas-lighting equipment. An example of this operational flexibility was recorded in the Newsrail magazine of March 1988 (p. 78), which during Easter 1941, when an additional Bendigo service was hauled by double-headed A2 locomotives A^{2}965 and A^{2}837 hauling 51G-40G-57G-41G-145B-28AV-35G-8AW-7CW.

=== Set configuration ===
Tait trains originally entered service as six-car sets, the majority made up of three "M" cars and three trailers. From the 1920s, sets were increased to a seven-car configuration, with the introduction of the "G" trailer cars. Those sets were made up of a four-car "block" and a three-car "unit", usually operating as an M-T-T-M+G-T-M set during peak hours. During the off-peak period, the three-car "unit" would be uncoupled and stored at Jolimont sidings.

As noted above, in peak traffic periods such as the Easter and the Christmas holiday seasons, the G type carriages were withdrawn from suburban service and used to boost the capacity of country trains.

The "D" type cars were the least common of the car types. By 1923, only 18 cars were fitted with driving equipment and coded "D". The rest became so-called "Ringer" trailers, with a white ring on the door indicating the compartment was available for the use of passengers. D cars were paired with M cars and run either in pairs, i.e. M-D-M-D, replacing an M-T-T-M set. However, in some cases, M-T-D sets ran on particularly flat, short-distance lines where late running, although annoying to the passengers, would not disrupt the entire system. One such example was the Altona Beach to Newport shuttle service, which ran hourly as of 1939.

The M-D+M-D sets became much more common when the suburban train fleet ballooned in 1964, with a "block" of cars made up M-D-M-D that could be split as required.

Motor cars were sometimes paired back-to-back for what was known as "E" trains. They were formed with two M cars acting as locomotives, hauling a train of typical outer-suburban or country stock. They ran to Frankston, where the train would split and steam engines would take the non-electrified carriages on to Mornington and Stony Point, and to Lilydale, where the train would split, and steam engines would take the non-electrified portion on to Healesville and Warburton. Those runs were abolished in 1958, following the arrival of the Walker railmotors, and operational practice changed to using connecting trains at the end of the electrified system, instead of running through carriages. A number of swing-door motor cars had been specially altered for E train use, but in practice they weren't always available, so Tait motors may have been required as a substitute.

One-car operation commenced in 1968, after the conversion of 470M the previous year and the end of union disputes over their introduction.

From 1960, some of the earlier Swing Door carriages were withdrawn and scrapped. Tait G cars that had been allocated to those sets were grouped together and, in conjunction with other carriages, were used on peak-hour services to and from Werribee. Those sets were later replaced by PL sets.

In May 1968, an eight-car Tait train was tested on the Frankston line, made up of three motor cars and five trailers, and entered service under the new timetable in August 1968. After 1973, the eight-car sets were reconfigured with a 50:50 motor–trailer mix to avoid special rosters restricting the three-motor-car sets to flatter lines.

From 1973, three-car sets were also reintroduced, using M-T-D consists, or occasionally M-T-M sets. Six-car M-T-T-T-T-M consists were also formed for peak hour use. Both of those were restricted to the flatter lines, where the lack of power would not be a major problem.

In 1975, a 14-car Tait train ran between the North Melbourne and Royal Park substations, to test a new protective relay device.

==== The Boat Train ====
The Boat Train
Overview
- Status: Ceased
- First service: March 1936
- Last service: October 1939
- Current operator: Victorian Railways

Route
- Termini: Flinders Street; Port Melbourne

In 1936, a short-lived experiment involved the exclusive use of six Tait carriages on a special train running from Flinders Street to Port Melbourne, to meet passengers off international ships. Called The Boat Train, the train was assembled using three M motor cars (242, 268, 380) and three T trailer cars (226, 321 and 330), in an M-T-M-T-T-M formation, likely as 242M-226T-268M-321T-330T-380M.

They were painted mid-blue, with silver roofs and black undergear. Red capital lettering was affixed to the roofs of the three M cars, above the middle compartments, with the name of the train. Floodlighting with incandescent globes was run along the sides of the carriage roofs, such that the entire train body was illuminated.

After final inspections by the three Railway Commissioners, H. W. Clapp, N. C. Harris and M. J. Canny, and the architect A. V. Stephenson and the workshops manager H. V. James, the first run was scheduled for 7 March 1936. The consist departed Flinders Street station at 9:10 am for Station Pier, to meet the Italian liner Esquilino. The return trip departed Station Pier at 10:15 am. Following this, the train ran three return trips on the following Sunday night, to meet the SS Oronsay. These trains left Flinders Street at 10:30 pm, 11:09 pm and 11:32 pm.

Shipping companies would publish in newspapers their six-monthly planned departures from Port Melbourne (P&O, Orient, Shaw Savill, Aberdeen & Commonwealth to England and Matson to the United States); ships to be met by The Boat Train would have an additional comment that the train was to leave Flinders St Platform 10, about 90 minutes prior to the vessel's departure time.

The train ran as required until October 1939, when disappointing patronage and the outbreak of World War II caused the service to be withdrawn. The six carriages were restored to normal service, and continued until the general withdrawal of the Tait fleet.

Photos of the train are noted as PTC collection H 1792 and 1793. A copy of the train is available in Microsoft Train Simulator.

== Equipment ==
General Electric traction equipment was fitted to the trains, of the same type as that in the Swing Door trains and enabling the trains to be operated in mixed sets using multiple-unit train control.

Internal carriage lighting in the Tait and Swing-door sets was provided as three rows of six light globes, wired in series; if one globe in a set failed, the other five on that circuit would also lose power. However, identifying the failed globe was usually straightforward as the glass tended to fog up.

== Conversions and alterations ==
Incomplete trailer car 441T was converted to experimental trailer car 201BT in 1950 with double width sliding doors to test design features for the Harris train. Later, a new 441T was constructed.

In 1958 class designation on the suburban network was abolished, with all painted indications of former First- and Second-class ticketing requirements painted over within two days; it took a little while longer to standardise all seating, and until that happened there were stories of passengers rushing to the former first-class trailer cars for the more comfortable seating.

Four motor cars were converted to double ended motors in 1968–1970 and renumbered 470M to 473M. These were mainly used on the Hurstbridge and Alamein routes.

From the mid-1970s the cost of replacing damaged glass windows was becoming prohibitive, and so one in three windows was sheeted over, with plywood on the inside and painted steel on the outside. Some carriages were also fitted with communication doors and/or diaphragms allowing staff and passengers to walk between carriages, particularly on two-carriage trains.

"Smoking" carriages were abolished in 1978.

==== Overhead Inspection Train ====
On 6 October 1980, 447M was modified into a Greasing Car, combining rail greasing, overhead lubrication, and overhead inspection duties before being renumbered 1447M in 1983 and later repainted all-over yellow in 1995 after a graffiti attack. It was Initially hauled by Tait motor cars 456M and 461M and later by double-ended Tait motors 1470M and 1471M, it subsequently operated with the Harris Greaser unit following coupler modifications and trials in February 1987, usually marshalled between two D type louvre vans to transition between couplings. As newer rolling stock featuring graphite pantograph strips eliminated the need for overhead lubrication and track lubrication was converted to manual oiling, 1447M gradually became redundant. It remained stored at Newport Workshops until 2008, when it was scrapped along with other rolling stock during the clean out of the Newport Rotten Road.

== Typical use ==
As of 1956, 584 Tait carriages were rostered for regular use (in conjunction with 218 Swing Door carriages).

76 seven-car sets of Tait cars were assembled as M-T-T-M-G-T-M, for use on the Broadmeadows to Sandringham (20), Williamstown Pier to Dandenong and Frankston (34), Glen Waverley to Fawkner and St Albans (19), Lilydale and Upper Ferntree Gully (1) and Thomastown and Hurstbridge (2) lines.

14x G cars were included in otherwise Swing-Door sets on the Box Hill lines, and a further four on the Thomastown and Hurstbridge group; two driving trailers were allocated to the Newport to Altona shuttle, and one M, two T and one G to the E Trains running towards Stony Point and Healesville.

This roster requires 229 of 261 M, 2 of 25 D and 95 of 103 G, but 230 T cars despite only 227 (plus 201BT) in service at the time. It is likely that G cars were used as substitutes for T cars, most likely in the E train sets. Alternatively some blocks could have been M-D-M-D, allowing for division of blocks for even shorter trains to save on operating costs late at night or on weekends.

=== Example roster (1981) ===
Roster as at 19.10.1981:

For 7-car sets, the first four (typically at the west end) are the Block, while the last three (typically at the east end) are the Unit.

The table totals 228 cars, with an additional 61 spare or undergoing painting, repair or scrapping.

Lowercase w and e indicate whether the car's driving compartment is facing west or east respectively, where applicable.

7-car sets were typically used on the Epping and Hurstbridge lines, with 19 sets required in a typical morning peak hour. On weekends, the four-car blocks were used, with the three-car units stabled to save on operating costs. Anything spare was used on the North Melbourne (or occasionally Camberwell) group of lines, which at the time did not have a connection to the City Loop, where wooden trains had been banned account fire risk. 6-car sets would be used on the Sandringham route, split offpeak and shared with the St Kilda and Port Melbourne lines, and if a path could be found across the junction, Epping and Hurstbridge. A single 2-car set was used on the Eltham-Hurstbridge shuttle weeknights, and on weekends the double-ended Motor car was used, with the driving trailer stabled. Two 2-car sets were used on the Saturday Camberwell-Alamein shuttle, with one pair on Sundays. From 4 October the Altona shuttle was discontinued, so the spare 2-car sets were coupled into a 6-car set and absorbed into that roster.

If being painted, Motors would be at Bendigo and all other types at Ballarat.

Cars renumbered have their previous identities noted.

7 w	6	5	4 e	3	2	1 e	Notes
241M	91G	237T	259M^{212M}	93G	409T	240M	
242M^{304M}	294T	62G	498M^{382M}	341T	394T	247M	
243M^{202M}	415T	253T	275M	84G	214D w	256M^{210M}	
246M^{204M}	418T	100G	288M^{229M}	230D w	431T	265M	
250M^{206M}	246T	385T	485M^{349M}	225D w	97G	266M	
261M	327T	212T	262M	2G	37G	285M^{228M}	
270M	428T	204D w	293M^{233M}	401T	216D w	292M	
278M	220T	249T	399M	6G	417T	294M^{235M}	
279M	232T	380T	244M^{203M}	424T	429T	296M^{236M}	380T fitted with 60W globes
280M^{224M}	440T	48G	291M^{301M}	210D w	204T	297M^{306M}	280M fitted with fluorescent lighting
287M	290T	18G	264M^{305M}	75G	298T	387M	
362M	243D e	257D e	448M	226T	85G	423M	257D fitted with 60W globes
403M	439T	249D w	255M	338T	92G	431M	
405M	414T	235T	455M	222D w	46G	432M	
414M	407T	239T	499M^{314M}	382T	28G	451M	
427M	403T	426T	257M	76G	203T	460M	
434M	254D e	35G	282M	36G	307T	469M^{327M}	
435M	241T	381T	416M	81G	343T	478M^{320M}	
443M	63G	260D w	449M	262D W	326T	480M^{356M}	449M with fluorescent lighting
453M	213T	398T	457M^{372M}	229D w	248T	486M	
454M	405T	245D w	392M	435T	433T	490M^{343M}	
	248M	346T	290M^{232M}	425M	47G	438M	248M & 438M with fluorescent lighting
	249M^{205M}	383T	492M^{340M}	433M	437T	479M^{347M}	
	253M	61G	488M^{365M}	436M	103G	439M	
	254M^{209M}	30G	411M	450M^{374M}	228T	299M^{361M}	30G fitted with 60W globes; table says 229M in place of 299M but that can't be true, and 299M is missing from table.
	258M^{211M}	32G	273M	467M^{351M}	208T	466M^{336M}	
	263M^{213M}	334T	272M	474M^{308M}	441T	464M^{319M}	
	271M	421T	276M	476M^{325M}	222T	298M	
	286M	344T	252M^{207M}	482M^{354M}	293T	481M^{360M}	
	366M	225T	475M^{312M}	494M^{375M}	64G	495M	
	373M	94G	300M^{309M}	381M	315T	367M	
				274M^{218M}	218T	491M^{363M}	Port Melbourne / St Kilda shuttles; 274M radio test unit
				383M	4G	239M	Port Melbourne / St Kilda shuttles
					468M^{350M}	202D e	
					470M^{300M}	253D e	470M double-ended
					471M^{398M}	241D e	471M double-ended
					472M^{244M}	248D e	472M double-ended
					473M^{397M}	265D e	473M double-ended
				461M w	447M ?	456M e	Overhead Greasing Train

Other cars not listed in sets:

Off Register / scrapping underway:

- 235D w, 236D w both at Spotswood
- 51G, 66G both at Spotswood, 78G at Newport
- 242M^{201M} at Newport, 283M, 310M, 329M, 346M, 407M, 412M, 496M^{353M}, 497M^{352M} at Spotswood, 400M, 493M^{379M}* at Jolimont, 487M^{328M} at Bendigo
- 254T, 427T both at Spotswood, 350T

Spare:

- 15G, 56G, 98G
- 238M, 251M, 260M, 269M^{217M}, 277M^{223M}, 289M, 388M, 408M, 452M, 483M^{321M}, 484M^{359M}, 489M^{386M}
- 205T, 224T, 230T, 236T, 251T, 292T, 301T, 302T, 306T, 419T, 423T, 425T, 436T
- 201BT held for preservation

Repairs:

- 245M (wired for 60W globes), 284M, 295M, 364M, 380M, 384M, 417M, 445M^{376M}, 459M, 465M^{313M}
- 389T, 396T

Painting:

- 89G, 102G
- 267M, 268M^{216M}, 281M^{227M}, 477M^{316M}
- 406T, 430T, 442T

== Retirement ==
The Tait trains were replaced from 1974 by the Hitachi trains sets, and later, the Comeng trains.

From 1981, the last 37 of them began to be replaced by 50 Comeng trains. Tait trains were not allowed in the City Loop after 1982, due to fire hazard presented by their wooden bodies, so they spent most of their final years on the Port Melbourne, St Kilda and Sandringham lines.

The longest-lived carriages of each class (lasting to 1984 or 1985) were:

- M: 240, 243, 246, 248, 252, 254, 256, 267, 269, 273, 281, 284, 296 and 299
- T: 203, 298, 346, 382, 383 and 394
- G: 2, 6, 28, 35, 37, 48 and 51

A large number of carriages were burned for scrap at Kingston. However, the large number of complaints from local residents ended the practice, and a program of public sales followed.

Due to asbestos found in the brakeblocks, amongst other industrial problems, the last of the 7 Tait trains were withdrawn from service by 27 December 1984.

On Friday 15 February 1985, the "great carriage auction" was held at Newport Workshops with large quantities of vehicle bodies sold and proceeds donated to the Australian Railway Historical Society's museum. The first carriage listed sold for $540, and prices rose through the day to as much as $3,000. Pairs of bogies, if required, were an additional $600, and cranes and road haulage were around $1,000 each. A total of 49xM, 24xT, 9xG and 2xD vehicles were sold, including a number that had not been transferred from either Jolimont Workshops or the Spotswood Reclamation Depot. However, a small contingent of ten carriages, comprising motors 256M, 269M, 279M, and 1468M alongside trailers 394T, 28G and 48G remained unsold and were stored at Newport Workshops, where several would linger for nearly two decades until being sold in the early 2000's.

As at July 1987, only nine Tait cars were still listed in the MetRail working timetable. These were preserved cars 317M-230D-208T-381M, out of use motors 1456M-1461M and the greaser set 1470M-1447 (Note: 1447 was unclassed by July 1987.)-1471M.

== Preservation ==
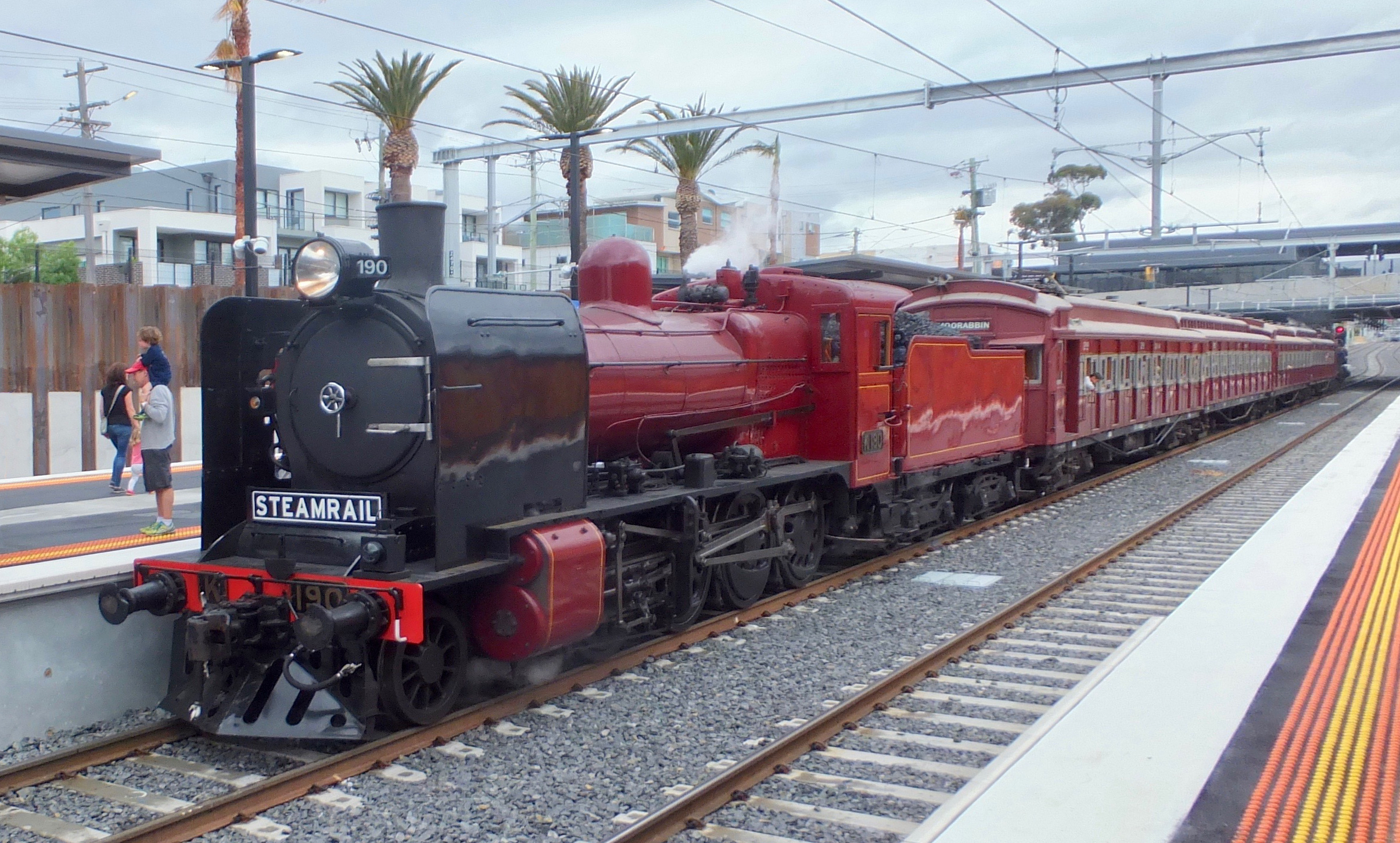
The restored Tait set hauled by K190 at McKinnon station on their first tour since 2004, November 2016

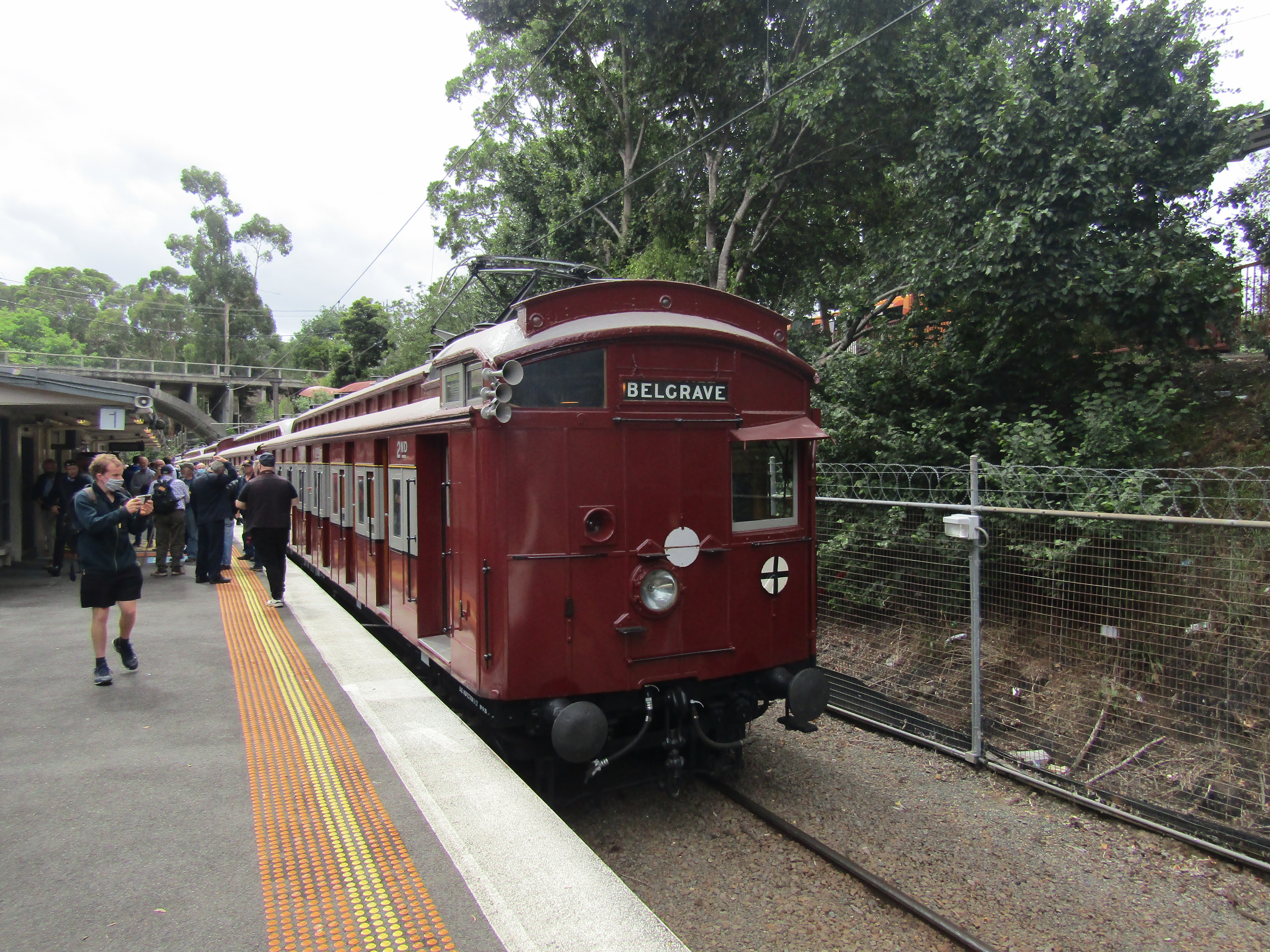
Restored Tait set at Belgrave Station on its re-launch run, 8 March 2022

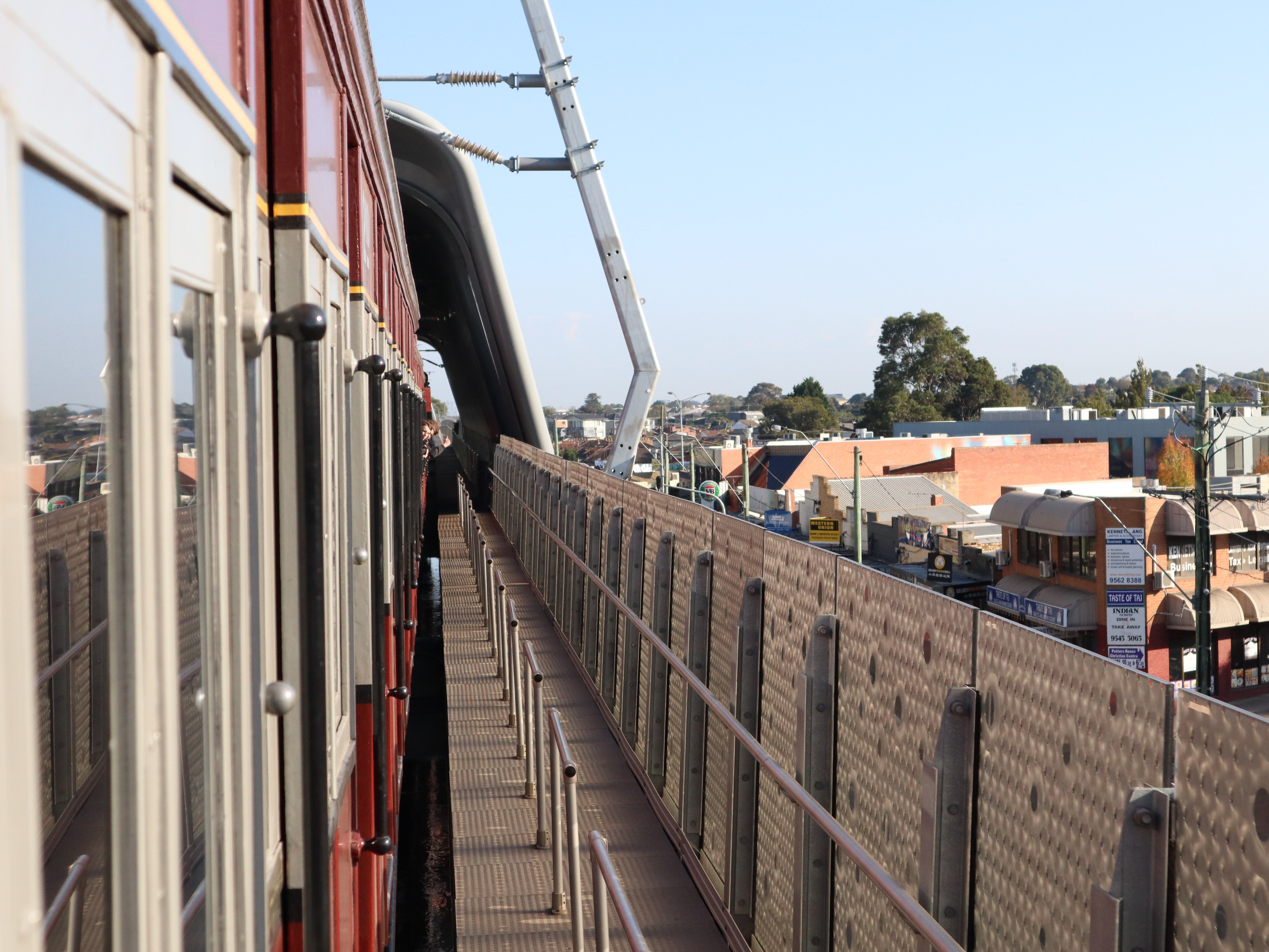
Elecrail's Tait set on "skyrail", 23 April 2022. The first public run of the Tait set after its re-launch and the first time a Tait set took passengers over the new elevated tracks

=== Elecrail ===
Carriages 486M^{317M}, 381M, 208T and 230D were retained by the then Public Transport Corporation as an operational heritage set, 486M was restored to its original number 317M. The heritage set is owned by VicTrack and in the care of Elecrail, a division of Steamrail Victoria. Elecrail also restored 470M, 327M and 341T to working order, along with 201BT, 267M, 284M, 427M, 257D, 48G, 1471M (double ended, formerly 471M) and 2CM (stored).

Due to the lack of door locks and other safety issues, the Tait cars had been banned from operating on the Melbourne rail network between 2004 and 2016. Their first run post-ban was on 12 November 2016 between two steam locomotives to provide motive power and air brakes, but with pantographs lowered and no internal lighting provided. The special was organised, from the West end, as D^{3}639, 317M, 230D, 208T, 381M and K190, and operated by Steamrail Victoria and V/Line on behalf of the Level Crossing Removal Authority's festivals at Ormond, McKinnon and Bentleigh stations. Since then they have been used on a number of suburban trips in the same configuration. In April 2019, Steamrail announced that federal funding had been granted to restore the set to electric service by early 2020. The funding will be used to reinstate the automatic stopping trip system, provide radios and speedometers for the first time, and restore and upgrade the mechanical and electrical components to modern standards as required.

The set began testing and driver training in May 2021. Car 341T was also used on some of these tests. The set had its official re-launch on 8 March 2022, running from Steamrail's depot in Newport to Belgrave via Essendon.

=== Other ===
The Mornington Railway has restored 98G to operational condition, being used for children's birthday parties and other private charters.

Many Tait car bodies were sold privately. Several have been converted to railway-themed restaurants, and many others are on private properties.

1364M^{364M}, 265D, 246T & 301T were used as café at the former Melaleuca Station, NSW (a steam hauled tourist tramway) until it closed in 2007, 1364M^{364M} was then sold to Yarra Valley Railway, the body was later scrapped in 2014.

- 243M^{202M}, 1388M^{388M} & 203T (along with van TP3) were part of the Bass Station Restaurant (removed in 2005).
- 249M^{205M} & 293T were near the Spion Kop Junction until about October 2002 (assumed scrapped on site).
- 285M & 428M were used by the Blind Institute, Mitcham from 1977.
- 1387M^{387M}, 1485M^{349M, 485M} & 268M^{216M} are at Bay Park Scout Park, Mt Martha.
- 1445M^{376M, 445M}, 241T & 248T are part of the former Choo Choo's Restaurant, Emerald (still on site as of 2022).
- 266M is located at Melbourne 4x4 Proving Ground at Mount Cottrell, the body was for auction in 2025 (still on site as of 2026).
- Unknown Trailer Carriage was split in half and scrapped (presumed 222T)
- Unknown Motor Carriage is located on a property in Tarrawingee
- Unknown Motor Carriage is located at a house in Heyfield.
- Half of an Mordialloc Motor is on a property in St Andrews.

=== Preserved Tait Carriages & History ===
Built		Last Renumbered	Final ID	Roof Type	Current Status
8 Dec 1915	88 ACP	05 Apr 1922	240M	Clerestory	Used as private residence along with a ZL van in Ferny Creek.
5 Mar 1915	50 ACP	30 Jan 1980	243M (2nd)	Clerestory	243M^{202M} 's location is unknown, last known location was Bass Station Restaurant.
5 Mar 1915	51 ACP	20 Dec 1979	244M (2nd)	—	Unknown, last location in Everton
11 Jun 1915	58 ACP	13 Dec 1979	256M (2nd)	Clerestory	256M^{210M} is located at Benton Rise Farm, Moorooduc.
11 Jun 1915	60 ACP	1 Feb 1980	259M (2nd)	Clerestory	Unknown
17 Nov 1916	61 ACPM	27 Feb 1972	261M	Clerestory	261M is located in Stradbroke.
27 Mar 1917	66 ACPM	13 Sep 1921	266M	Clerestory	266M is located at the Melbourne 4X4 Proving Ground in Mount Cottrell
9 Mar 1917	67 ACPM	27 Feb 1922	267M	Clerestory	Stored Lot 100
23 Jul 1917	64 ACP	12 Mar 1980	268M (2nd)	Clerestory	268M^{216M} is at Bay Park Scout Park, Mt Martha.
23 Jul 1915	65 ACP	29 Feb 1980	269M (2nd)	Clerestory	269M is located in Macclesfield.
27 Mar 1917	70 ACPM	27 Feb 1922	270M	Clerestory	270M is located near Bendigo, It's being for sale on Facebook.
5 April 1922	71 ACP	24 Mar 1980	277M	—	277M^{223M} was last sighted in Ringwood North, car dug into hill
6 Feb 1918	79 ACPM	27 Feb 1922	279M	Clerestory	Static
8 May 1922	72 ACP	1 Feb 1980	280M	—	280M^{224M} was last sighted in Hoppers Crossing, near a car yard
28 Aug 1915	75 ACPM	1 Feb 1980	281M (2nd)	Clerestory	Unknown, privately owned in eastern Melbourne.
22 Mar 1918	82 ACPM	27 Feb 1922	282M	Clerestory	282M is at Red Rattler Retreat, Boorhaman and used for accommodation.
22 Mar 1918	84 ACPM	27 Feb 1922	284M	Clerestory	Stored Lot 100
24 May 1922	285 M	—	285M (1st)	Clerestory	Was used by the Blind Institute, Mitcham from 1977.
17 Sep 1915	76 ACP	—	285M (2nd)	Clerestory	Unknown
9 Jun 1922	287 M	—	287M	Clerestory	287M is used as private residence at Crystal Waters Eco Village.
7 Oct 1915	84 ACP	12 March 1980	296M (2nd)	—	Unknown
6 Sep 1915	42 BCP	Oct 1984	317M	Clerestory	Operational Elecrail
19 Oct 1915	52 BCP	xx.xx.1988	327M	Clerestory	Restoration by Elecrail.
6 Feb 1918	88 BCPM	27 Feb 1922	381M	Clerestory	Operational Elecrail
17 Dec 1925	427 M	—	427M	Clerestory	Stored East Block.
18 Nov 1926	428 M	—	428M	Clerestory	Was used by the Blind Institute, Mitcham from 1977.
7 May 1926	433 M	—	433M	Semi-elliptical	Derelict condition in Myrniong.
3 Mar 1926	435 M	—	435M	Semi-elliptical	Derelict condition in Myrniong.
31 Mar 1915	25 BCP	circa 1999	470M	Clerestory	Restoration by Elecrail
20 Sep 1922	397 M	9 Oct 1970	473M	Clerestory	473M is privately owned in north western Victoria.
12 Jul 1922	356 M	5 Jun 1981	480M	Clerestory	Static Exford
28 Jun 1916	79 BCP	15 Jun 1981	482M	Clerestory	482M was located on a property in Cockatoo, which was for sale in early 2025.
20 Aug 1915	43 BCP	1 Jun 1981	495M	Clerestory	495M^{318M} is located in Diggers Rest
31 Jul 1915	39 BCP	28 May 1981	499M	Clerestory	499M was at Red Rattler Bricks & Pavers, Hoppers Crossing from around 1999 until it was redeveloped in 2012. It was then on sold to private buyers
6 Feb 1918	87 BCPM	8 Mar 1983	1380M	Clerestory	1380M is privately owned in Hoddles Creek.
22 Mar 1918	90 BCPM	27 Feb 1922	1383M	Clerestory	1383M is located in a property at Little River, which is viewable from the train.
12 Jul 1922	387 M	17 Mar 1983	1387M	Clerestory	Located at Bay Park Scout Park, Mt Martha.
14 Aug 1922	388 M	8 Mar 1983	1388M	Clerestory	388M is located behind Grace Chapel Archies Creek alongside a South Australian Railways Redhen. Formerly located at Bass Station Restaurant.
21 Aug 1922	392 M	4 Mar 1983	1392M	Clerestory	1392M is/was owned by a couple in central Victoria, which had uploaded photos to their blog of them restoring the Motor Car.
3 Oct 1922	403M	c.1983	1403M	Clerestory	1403M was plinthed at St Kilda station prior to 1999, was to be incorporated into the Metropol as a bar or café, but was badly vandalised and scrapped on site before construction started
23 Oct 1925	423M	27 Jul 1983	1423M	Semi-elliptical	1423M was last sighted in Monegeetta North
5 Feb 1926	436 M	—	1436M	Semi-elliptical	436M & 97G are located at Rain Hayne & Shine Farmyard in Balnarring, Victoria.
7 Sep 1917	82 BCPM	10 Aug 1983	1445M	Clerestory	Apart of the former Choo Choo's Restaurant, Emerald (still on site as of 2022).
19 Apr 1944	446M	27 Mar 1983	1446M	Semi-elliptical	1446M was last seen in Trentham split in half, as of July 2026 the body was moved off the property and scrapped.
26 Jul 1946	455 M	10 Aug 1984	1455M	Semi-elliptical	Located on a property in Barwon Heads along with 1477M.
17 Jun 1949	458 M	26 Jul 1984	1458M	Semi-elliptical	1458M is in an unknown condition.
24 Jun 1949	460M	26 Jul 1984	1460M	—	Unknown, Body last sighted in Ballarat
12 Jun 1916	75 BCP	10 Aug 1984	1468M	Clerestory	Unknown condition
4 Sep 1922	398 M	21 Aug 1984	1471M	Clerestory	Stored East Block
31 Jul 1915	41 BCP	26 Jul 1984	1477M	Clerestory	Located on a property in Barwon Heads along with 1455M.
24 Sep 1915	45 BCP	circa 01.2024	1478M	Clerestory	320M^{1478M} is at a private home in Warranwood, Victoria since around 1990, and has been restored to become an artist studio. There is a video of the restoration.
13 Apr 1916	74 BCP	2 Aug 1984	1485M	Clerestory	Located at Bay Park Scout Park, Mt Martha.
26 Feb 1916	68 BCP	5 June 1981	1490M	Clerestory	1490M is located at Sunshine Roofing Holdings in Albion.
23 Jun 1921	1 CM	—	1CM	Clerestory	Unknown
23 Jun 1921	2 CM	—	2CM	Clerestory	Stored Lot 100
9 Oct 1925	4 CM	—	4CM	Clerestory	Located at property in Cowra.
9 Nov 1923	2 G	—	2G	Clerestory	2G is located at Grampians Station near Pomonal and used for accommodation.
2 Nov 1923	4 G	—	4G	Clerestory	Privately owned in Yarra Valley region.
27 Nov 1923	5 G	—	5G	—	5 G is in a unknown condition
20 Dec 1923	28 G	—	28G	Clerestory	28G is located near Lethbridge.
18 Dec 1923	32 G	—	32G	—	32G was last sighted at Macedon, could've been seen from Bendigo rail line
4 Mar 1924	33 G	—	33G	—	33G is in a unknown condition.
8 Apr 1924	35 G	—	35G	—	35G was last sighted at Yelta
15 May 1924	47 G	—	47G	—	47G was last sighted at Guildford
17 Apr 1924	48 G	—	48G	Clerestory	Stored East Block
25 Nov 1924	56 G	—	56G	Semi-elliptical	56G (the first built elliptical roof G carriage) is located in Lara along with an unknown Motor Carriage.
9 Dec 1924	75 G	—	75G	Semi-elliptical	Static Barnawartha
21 Dec 1926	94 G	—	94G	—	94G is in a unknown condition
21 Dec 1926	97 G	—	97G	Semi-elliptical	436M & 97G are located at Rain Hayne & Shine Farmyard in Balnarring, Victoria.
12 Jul 1944	98 G	—	98G	Semi-elliptical	Operational with Mornington Tourist Railway.
14 Jul 1950	441 T	14 Jul 1950	201BT	Semi-elliptical	Originally built as 441 T, was never finished then converted into the Harris EMU Prototype trailer. Preserved by Elecrail, and stored at Lot 100.
19 Nov 1910	3 APT	13 Sep 1921	203T	Clerestory	203T is now on display at State Coal Mine, Wonthaggi. This was one of the original cars from the first Tait set.
19 Nov 1910	4 APT	27 Feb 1922	204T	Clerestory	204T is located near Exford. This was one of the original cars from the first Tait set.
26 Nov 1910	8 APT	13 Sep 1921	208T	Clerestory	Operational Elecrail
30 Nov 1911	20 APT	13 Sep 1921	220T	Clerestory	Privately owned in Gippsland area.
30 Aug 1912	22 APT	30 Jun 1922	222T	Clerestory	222T was last sighted in Parwan
30 Sep 1912	25 APT	27 Feb 1922	225T	Clerestory	225T was last sighted in Mathoura.
19 Dec 1912	36 AP	7 Mar 1922	236T	Clerestory	Was at a farm in the Geelong Area but was sold in 2023 on Yarra Valley Auctions, moved to Moorabool.
18 Mar 1913	41 APT	27 Feb 1922	241T	Clerestory	Apart of the former Choo Choo's Restaurant, Emerald (still on site as of 2022).
20 May 1913	46 APT	27 Feb 1922	246T	Clerestory	Static, unknown location.
13 Sep 1921	47 AP	—	247T	—	247T was last sighted in Bulla
7 Jun 1913	48 AP	13 Sep 1921	248T	Clerestory	Apart of the former Choo Choo's Restaurant, Emerald (still on site as of 2022).
22 May 1911	15 BP	27 Feb 1922	301T	Clerestory	Used as private residence. Formerly located at Melaleuca Station.
25 Nov 1912	31 BP	27 Feb 1922	317T	Clerestory	317T was at the old Sandhurst Town, Bendigo from around 1994 (still on site as of 2026 in a dilapidated state).
7 Jun 1913	48 BP	27 Feb 1922	334T	Clerestory	Converted to accommodate people in Scotchman's Lead.
3 Oct 1922	52 BP	12 Jun 1922	338T	Clerestory	338T was used at Melton McDonalds from around 1993 (has since been removed).
8 Sep 1913	55 BP	5 Oct 1922	341T	Clerestory	Operational Elecrail
14 Aug 1922	380 T	14 Aug 1922	380T	Clerestory	380T is at Griffith Caravan Village, NSW and used for accommodation.
21 Aug 1922	382 T	21 Aug 1922	382T	—	382T was last seen stored at Steamrail's Ballarat East Depot
21 Aug 1922	383 T	21 Aug 1922	383T	—	383T was located at a property in Menzies Creek, It was sold in 2000. Location unknown now
16 Oct 1922	394 T	16 Oct 1922	394T	Clerestory	394T is at Gemco Players Community Theatre, 19 Kilvington Drive, Emerald (restored on site in 2025 and being used as a pop-up wine-bar).
21 May 1926	401 T	21 May 1926	401T	Semi-elliptical	401T is located in Bacchus Marsh, along with an unknown D Carriage located nearby. Was the first elliptical roof trailer carriage built.
23 Apr 1926	403 T	23 Apr 1926	403T	Semi-elliptical	403T was last seen in Frankston
2 Jul 1926	409 T	2 Jul 1926	409T	Semi-elliptical	409T is located in Noorat East
18 Nov 1926	418 T	18 Nov 1926	418T	Semi-elliptical	418T is in a unknown condition, featured in The Age, December 29th 1995 page 2 with the owner
27 Jan 1927	423 T	—	423T	—	423 T is in a unknown condition.
5 Jan 1926	433 T	—	433T	Semi-elliptical	433T is in a unknown condition, last seen at North Melbourne
30 Aug 1946	435 T	—	435T	Semi-elliptical	435T was last seen at Oaklands Junction
6 Sep 1946	436 T	—	436T	Semi-elliptical	436T is located at a property in Sunbury.
22 Jul 1949	438 T	—	438T	Semi-elliptical	438T is plinthed near Barnawartha along with 75 G.
21 Jun 1960	442 T	—	442T	Semi-elliptical	Stored East Block
30 Nov 1911	17 ACP	27 Feb 1922	202D	Clerestory	Plinthed in Bayswater, Victoria. One of two rebuilt elliptical roof drivers trailer with first class seating and larger torpedo ventilators.
17 Feb 1913	12 BCP	3 Jul 1922	209D	Clerestory	209D is located in Wallington (still on site as of 2026)
17 Feb 1913	13 BCP	3 Jul 1922	210D	Clerestory	210D is located in Mailors Flat, outside of Warrnambool as part of an Antique Shop. Advertised for sale in 2025.
6 Nov 1911	14 ACP	7 Aug 1922	218D	Clerestory	218D & 220D are part of a former restaurant at Swan Hill (still on site as of 2026).
30 Sep 1912	6 BCP	3 Oct 1926	220D	Clerestory	As listed above.
19 Nov 1910	3 ACP	12 May 1965	230D	Clerestory	Operational Elecrail
20 May 1913	30 ACP	19 Dec 1969	257D	Clerestory	Stored at Lot 100.
28 Jun 1913	35 ACP	5 May 1971	262D	Clerestory	262D is located in Daisy Hill.
27 Aug 1913	38 ACP	3 Mar 1972	265D	Clerestory	Moved to Biarra

== Miniature railways ==
=== 7.25" Gauge ===
At Diamond Valley Railway, there is a four car passenger carrying TAIT unit running on occasional open days. It is 1/6th full size and can carry 15 passengers. This re-creates original carriages 437M+442M(Painted as 67ACPM)+438T+221D. It runs on batteries as people get in the way of the overhead wire.

A 5” gauge 4 car M T T M Tait set appeared in 2024. It is very popular amongst miniature train fans.
