= Tanti Park railway station =

Railway station in Victoria, Australia

Tanti Park
- View of the platform looking east in 2026

General information
- Coordinates: 38°13′25″S 145°04′01″E
- Line: Mornington
- Platforms: 1
- Tracks: 1

History
- Opened: 18 June 1936; 1999 (re-opened)
- Closed: 15 June 1981
- Former names: Mornington Racecourse Platform (1936-1969)

Services
Preceding station	Mornington Tourist Railway	Following station
Moorooduc Terminus	Mornington line	Mornington Terminus

Former services
Preceding station	VicRail	Following station
Moorooduc towards Frankston	Mornington line	Narambi towards Mornington
List of closed railway stations in Melbourne
Location

Tanti Park is a railway station operated by the Mornington Railway Preservation Society on the Mornington Tourist Railway. It opened in 1936 as Mornington Racecourse Platform and is located in the Melbourne suburb of Mornington. It is a ground level station, featuring one side platform.

== History ==
Tanti Park opened on 18 June 1936 as Mornington Racecourse Platform. It was opened for general traffic on 12 April 1969, and was renamed Tanti Park on 19 December of that year.

In 1977, flashing lights and bells were provided at the Bungower Road level crossing, located at the up end of the platform.

In the same year, a short subsidiary platform was constructed on the other side of the Bungower Road level crossing. That allowed passengers to board and alight from up rail motor services after they had passed the level crossing, so that the crossing warning lights did not operate unnecessarily while up trains were stopped at the main platform.

On 15 June 1981, Tanti Park station was closed, along with the whole Mornington railway line. The station was reactivated in 1999 when the Mornington Railway Preservation Society began its heritage operation, running trains on part of the former Mornington line, from Moorooduc to its new Mornington station. Since mid-2009, the station has been unstaffed, but remains a pick-up and drop-off point for passengers travelling on the tourist railway.

== Platforms and services ==
Tanti Park platform arrangement
Platform	Line	Destination	Notes
1	Mornington	Moorooduc	Operates for tourist services only
1	Mornington	Mornington	Operates for tourist services only
