= Moorooduc railway station =

Railway station in Victoria, Australia

Moorooduc
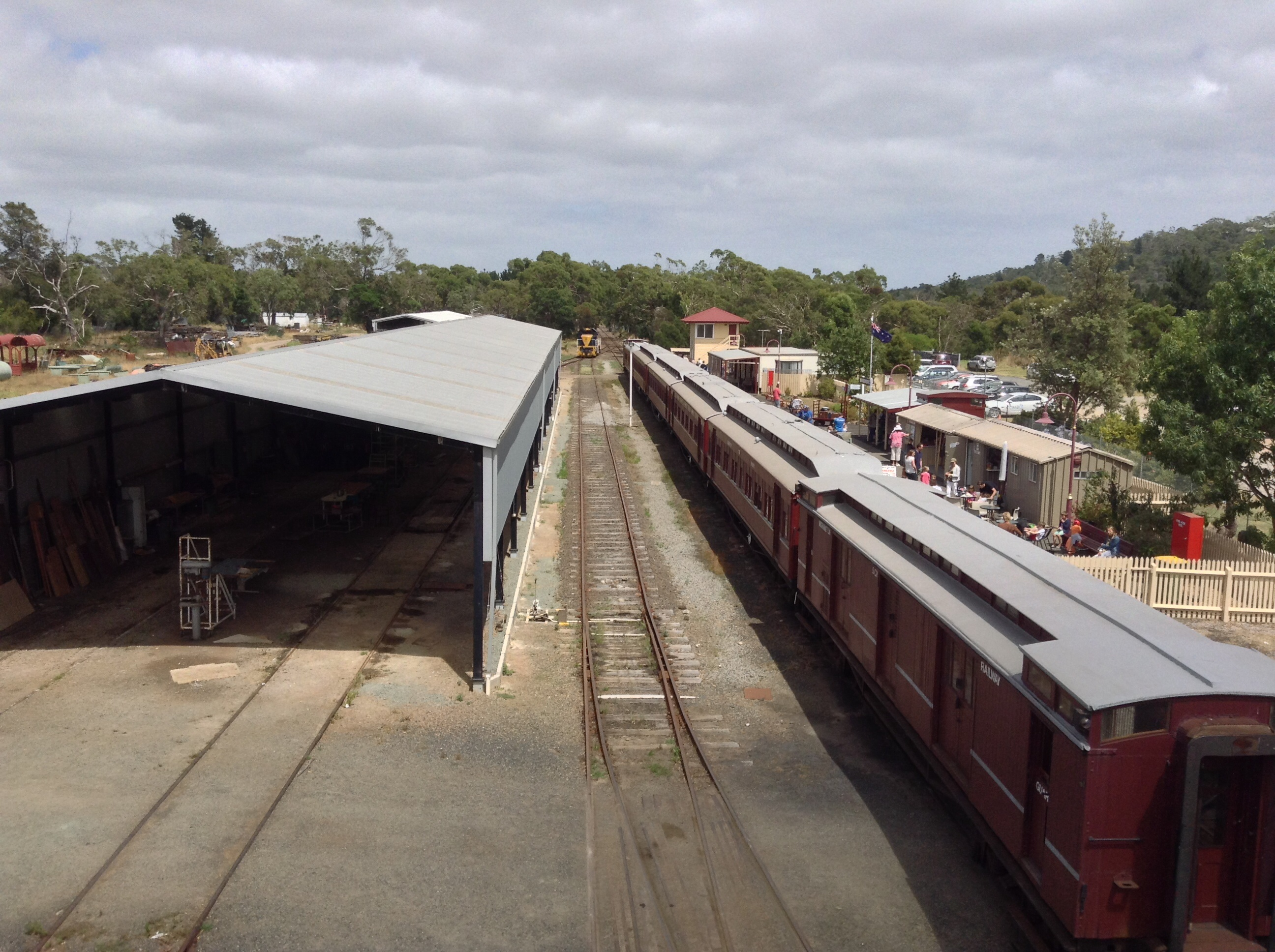
- Platform and rail yard, January 2014

General information
- Coordinates: 38°12′50.28″S 145°06′26.43″E
- Line: Mornington
- Platforms: 1 (with dock)
- Tracks: 7 (4 in use)

Other information
- Status: Staffed

History
- Opened: 10 September 1889
- Closed: 15 June 1981

Services
Preceding station	Mornington Tourist Railway	Following station
Terminus	Mornington line	Tanti Park towards Mornington

Former services
Preceding station	VicRail	Following station
Baxter towards Frankston	Mornington line	Tanti Park towards Mornington
List of closed railway stations in Melbourne
Location

Moorooduc railway station is located on Two Bays Road, Mount Eliza, Victoria, Australia. It was originally a stop on the Mornington railway line and was opened in September 1889. It was closed with the line in June 1981.

The station has one side platform and is now the base for the Mornington Tourist Railway. It is the eastern terminus of the railway's heritage train services. There are five other tracks, used for locomotives to run-around trains, maintenance, storage and repairs.

== Facilities ==
Moorooduc station has a heritage signal box moved from the defunct Somerton Station. Although it is not used, it is open for free inspection.

The footbridge from the now-closed Fitzroy Station has been re-erected at the station.

A toilet block was installed in 2013. There is a carriage dock which is mainly used for renovations and maintenance.

Adjacent to the station is the Mount Eliza Regional Park which incorporates the Moorooduc Quarry Flora and Fauna Reserve.

== Future plans ==
The Mornington Railway Preservation Society, operators of the Mornington Tourist Railway, has plans to restore the former line that continues over the Moorooduc Highway to Baxter station on the Stony Point railway line. A few kilometres down the line is the proposed Sumner Road station, but the future of the project depends on obtaining the necessary funding.
