= Mornington Crescent (disambiguation) =

Mornington Crescent is a street in the London Borough of Camden.

Mornington Crescent may also refer to:

- Mornington Crescent tube station, situated at the northern end of the street
- Mornington Crescent (game), a spoof game named after the station, as played on the BBC Radio 4 show I'm Sorry, I Haven't a Clue
- "Mornington Crescent", a track on the Belle and Sebastian album The Life Pursuit
- "Mornington Crescent", a track on the Bonzo Dog Doo-Dah Band album Pour l'Amour des Chiens
- Mornington Crescent, a 1995 album by the British band My Life Story
