= Mornington railway station =

Former railway station in Melbourne, Victoria, Australia

Mornington
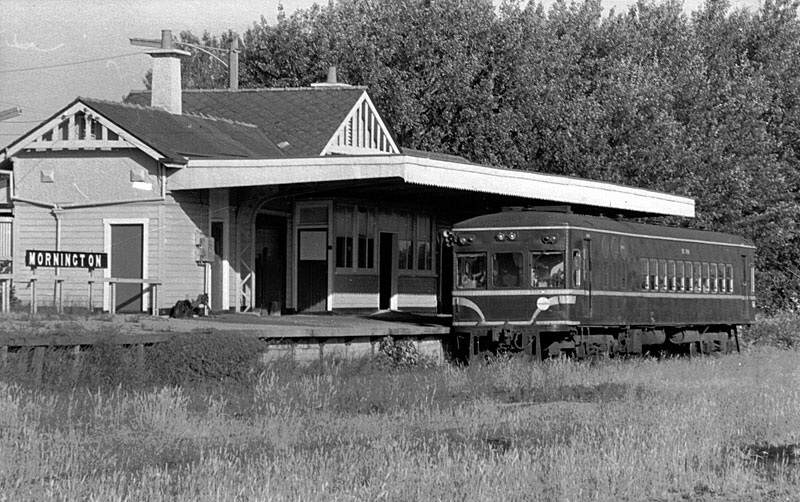
- A DERM at Mornington station, 1950s

General information
- Location: Railway Grove, Mornington, Victoria
- Coordinates: 38°13′05″S 145°02′19″E
- Operator: Victorian Railways
- Line: Mornington
- Platforms: 1
- Tracks: 1

Other information
- Status: Demolished

History
- Opened: 10 September 1889; 137 years ago
- Closed: 22 June 1981; 45 years ago

Services
Preceding station	VicRail	Following station
Narambi towards Frankston	Mornington line	Terminus
List of closed railway stations in Melbourne
Location

Mornington was a railway station operated by Victorian Railways, which served as the terminus of the Mornington line. It opened in 1889 and served the Melbourne suburb of Mornington until the line closed to passengers in 1981. It was a ground level station, featuring one side platform.

Since 1999, a new Mornington railway station – located approximately 1.5 kilometres (0.93 mi) east of the original – has operated for tourist services on the Mornington Tourist Railway.

== History ==
The Mornington railway line opened on 10 September 1889, branching from Mornington Junction (later renamed Baxter station) on the Stony Point line to Mornington. The line only included two stations (Moorooduc and Mornington) at the time of its opening, but several stations – including RMSP 20/RMSP 16, Mornington Racecourse/Tanti Park and Narambi – were later built to the east of Mornington. The station remained open until the closure of passenger services on the Mornington line on 15 June 1981.

In 1984, the Mornington Railway Preservation Society (MRPS) was formed with the objective of securing access to the now-closed line in order to reopen it as a heritage railway. It was granted access and operating rights to the line in 1991, but the line between RMSP 16 and Mornington – which was considered to have significant commercial value – was sold to private investors by the Victorian state government. A shopping centre was built on the site of the former station, with no trace of the platform or building remaining.

The Mornington Tourist Railway opened for passenger services in 1999, which saw a new Mornington railway station] constructed near the former Yuilles Road level crossing, approximately 1.5 kilometres (0.93 mi) from the original Mornington station. On 19 September 2004, a plaque was unveiled adjacent to the former station site to commemorate 150 years of rail in Victoria.

== Platforms and services ==
Mornington platform arrangement
Platform	Line	Destination	Notes
1	Mornington	Frankston	
