= Mornington Tourist Railway =

Heritage Railway in Victoria, Australia

Coordinates: 38°13′47″S 145°03′01″E

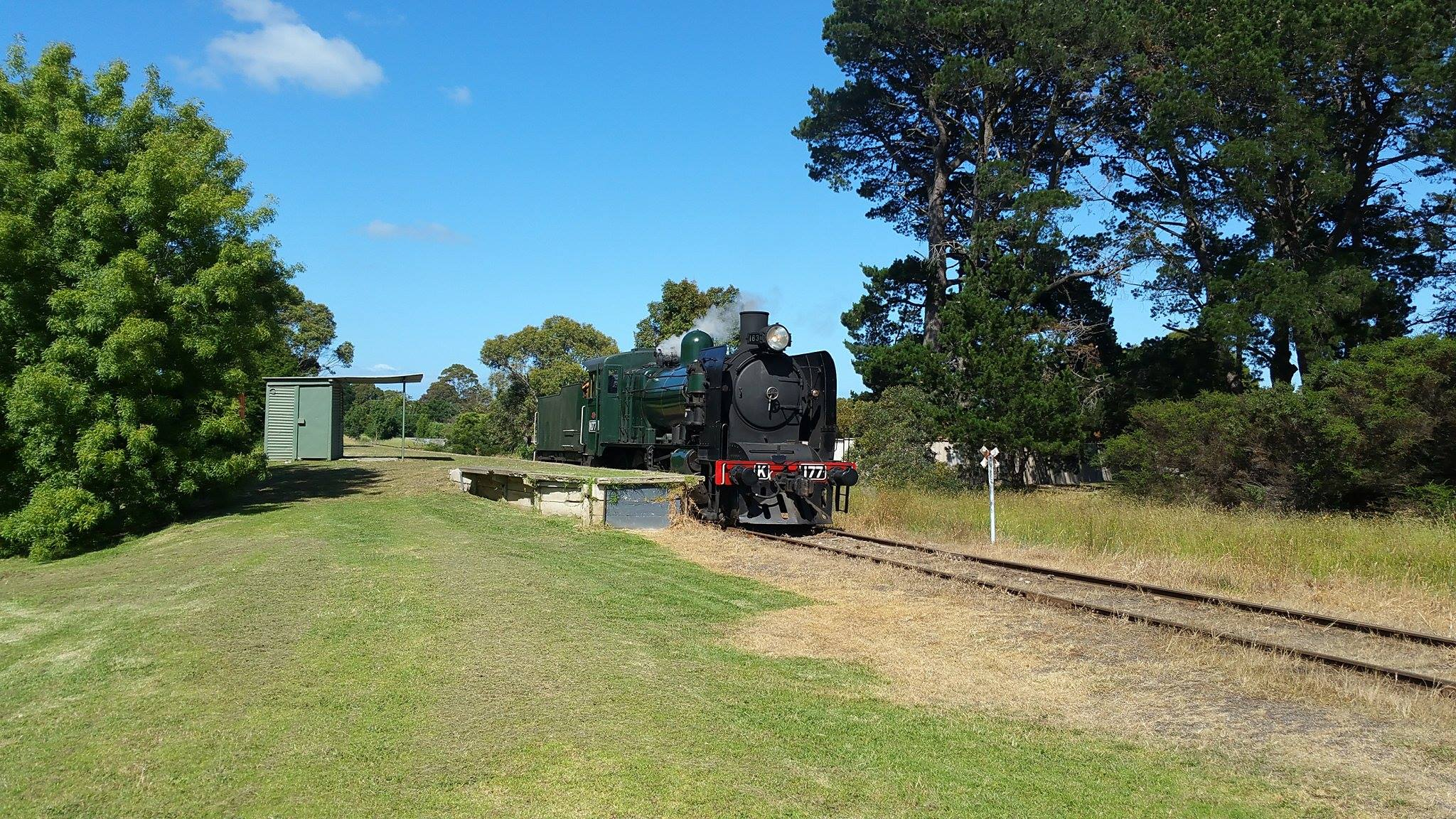
- K163 masquerading as K177 at Tanti Railway Station

Overview
- Status: Heritage railway
- Website: morningtonrailway.org.au

Service
- Type: Tourist railway

History
- Completed: 1889
- Reopened: 1999
- Closed: 1981

The Mornington Tourist Railway is a heritage railway near Mornington, a town on the Mornington Peninsula, south-west of Melbourne, Victoria. The line is managed by the Mornington Railway Preservation Society and operates on part of the former Victorian Railways branch line which ran from Baxter to Mornington.

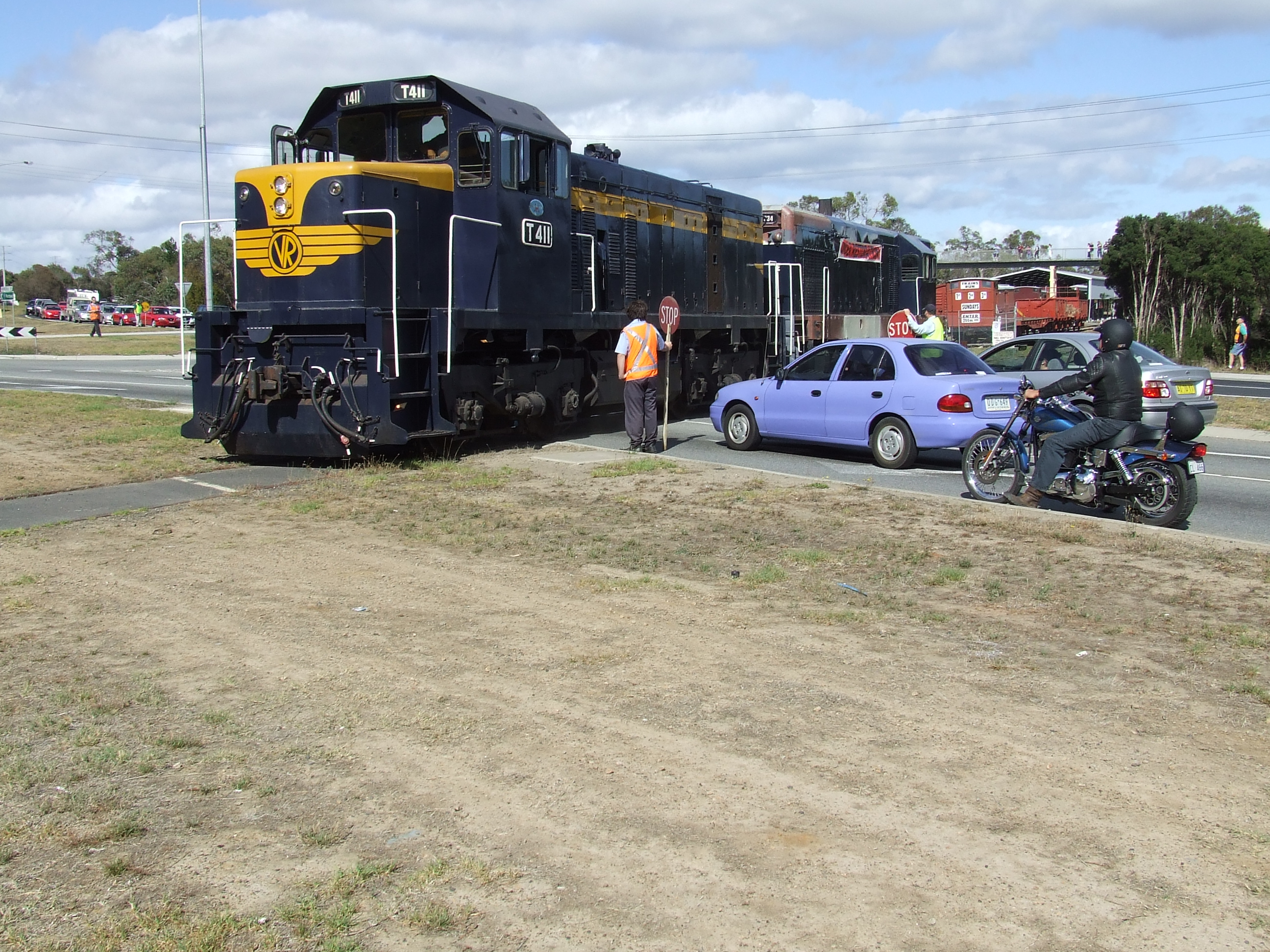
Two diesel locomotives cross Moorooduc Highway in February 2007

== History ==
The Mornington railway line was a rural railway branching from the Stony Point railway line at Baxter. The line operated for 92 years before closing. Ten years later, the line was reopened as a heritage railway.

- 1888—In August the contract for building the line was given to David Munro for £25,000. A short branch line was built to Moorooduc quarry to transport stone for ballasting the line.
- 1889—Baxter to Mornington railway line opened on 10 September.
- 1942—Passenger service ceased.
- 1966— Passenger service reinstated.
- 1981—The line was closed.
- 1984—The Mornington Railway Preservation Society (MRPS) was formed.
- 1988—Locomotive K163, restored and began running on the mainline network.
- 1991—The MRPS negotiated the lease of the Mornington Line from the junction at Baxter to Nepean Highway level crossing, Mornington.
- 1999—The line was reopened as a heritage railway from Moorooduc to Mornington.
- 2014—The Mornington railway celebrated 30 years of operation and 125 years of the Mornington line
- 2015—The Mornington railway received W241 from 707 Operations and 7CV from Seymour Railway Heritage Centre (SRHC). 59RM was sent to DERMPAV for eventual restoration
- 2017— The group obtained Melville for the SRHC, and was transferred from Newport Workshops to Moorooduc Yard in 2019.
- 2020— On 13 February, K163 was transferred from Moorooduc to Steamrail Victoria for maintenance work. In March, 34BE was transferred from the former South Gippsland Tourist Railway to Moorooduc, for eventual restoration.
- 2021— The former city-bound station building from Cheltenham station, arrived at railway to be rebuilt at Moorooduc Station

== Mornington Railway Preservation Society ==
The Mornington Railway Preservation Society (MRPS) was formed out of a public meeting in 1984, with the objective of securing access to the then-closed Mornington railway line. The vision was to reopen it as a heritage railway, focusing on the operation of steam-hauled passenger trains.

On 9 October 1986 a train operated from Tottenham Yard to the Lysaght's Siding, where the society was then based. The train consist was locomotive B65, 471ZD, 85WW, an HD van (Note: The HD van delivered in 1986 did not have an external number displayed on delivery, but as of August 2026 the only HD van on the Mornington Railway is HD73, so it may have been this one.), 278W, 152W, 257W, 469ZD, 98G, 611ZD, and NOBX81U. After arriving and shunting the locomotive, NOBX and three guard vans departed, leaving the Society with four workmens sleepers and a storage truck, plus its first passenger carriage, Tait dual electric/gas lighting carriage 98G. A community employment grant provided funding to restore two of the vehicles, and about two weeks later they were shunted along new track laid by the Society into a dedicated shed using nearly completely restored engine K163.

In 1991, the MRPS was granted a State Government Order in Council, giving access and operating rights to the line, so it could be operated as a heritage railway.

Prior to the granting of the Order in Council to the MRPS, the final section of the line between Rail Motor Stopping Place (RMSP) 16 and the former Mornington terminus, which was considered to have significant commercial value, was sold to private investors by the State Government. The track and infrastructure at the station was removed and some parcels of the land were subsequently developed, including an extension to the Mornington Bush Nursing Hospital and a new shopping complex erected on the site of the former Mornington station itself. A commemorative plaque and replica station name board, erected by Mornington Historical Society adjacent to the shopping centre, is now the only visible evidence of the original terminus.

The 70-foot (21 m) turntable from Mornington Station was removed by SteamRail Victoria, which had been the custodians of it by arrangement with the State Government up until the time the site was sold. The turntable was later overhauled by SteamRail and re-installed at Warrnambool, where it is still in use, being required there to enable R class steam locomotives to be turned at that location. SteamRail offered the MRPS a 53-foot (16 m) turntable, formerly at Yea, as a substitute, which is suitable for turning K, J, D3 and Y class locomotives. They are the only steam locomotive classes considered likely to operate on the line in the foreseeable future.

The station building at Mornington was made available to the MRPS for re-use, but was found to be infested with termites and largely unusable. The MRPS was able to recover most of the points, and some track, from the station yard. They will eventually be used to provide additional sidings at Moorooduc station, the main operating centre of the railway. Two palm trees, which graced the garden in front of the original station building for many years, were relocated to the new station site, but did not survive the transplanting in their new location.

At present, the heritage railway runs between Moorooduc station and the new Mornington station, which is sited at Yuilles Road in Mornington, 100m from the site of RMSP 16. The new station was opened formally on Sunday 18 April 1999, as a platform requiring pull-push working. A run-around loop was added later. There is an intermediate stop at Tanti Park station. There are plans for the remaining section of line, between Moorooduc station and Baxter station, to be restored. The Peninsula Link freeway has been constructed with an overpass across the line to allow for continued operation, and might even assist future operations to Baxter by removing significant traffic from the Moorooduc Highway level crossing.

== Operations ==
The MRPS is in possession of four former Victorian Railways K class steam locomotives, K 163 (formerly plinthed in Frankston), K 177 (donated by Langi Morgala Museum in Ararat), K 159 (formerly plinthed in Hamilton) and K 191 (formerly plinthed in Wangaratta). K 163 is the only one currently in service. K 177 is under heavy restoration, and K 191 has been disassembled for inspection and long term restoration. The MRPS also has two T class diesel locomotives (T334 and T411).

Tourist trains run on each Sunday of each month between Moorooduc and Mornington railway stations, although the current Mornington station is displaced somewhat due to the original alignment having been built over.

=== Steam locomotives ===
Number	Image	Year built	Builder	Status	Notes
K 159		1940	Victorian Railways Newport Workshops	Stored	Previously plinthed in a park in Hamilton in country Victoria. Stored for possible future restoration. A locomotive was reassembled as a composite of unrestorable parts from K159, K174 and K177; this unnumbered locomotive is now displayed at K159's previous home in the park at Hamilton.
K 163		1941	Victorian Railways Newport Workshops	Operational	Was plinthed in a park in Frankston after withdrawal from service by the Victorian Railways. Restored to steam by the MRPS in 1985, it saw mainline service until early to mid‑1990s. It was then booked for its 25-year overhaul in 2005 and returned to service 2010. In 2016 it wore K177 plates for the 75th birthday of K177. On 23 February 2020, the locomotive was transferred by road to Newport for an overhaul. On 8 January 2023, the locomotive relaunched at Moorooduc following the overhaul.
K 174		1941	Victorian Railways Newport Workshops	Disassembled/Scrapped	Salvaged from static display in Edinburgh Gardens, Fitzroy North by the MRPS in 1997. The locomotive as a whole was in very poor condition and unrestorable, however numerous components have been used in the restoration of K177 (including the frames).
K 177		1941	Victorian Railways Newport Workshops	Under restoration	Donated to the Mornington Railway by Langi Morgala Museum in Ararat. Under heavy restoration, using parts from other locomotives (including K174). As the restored locomotive uses the frames from K174, it would normally have been known by that number; however the Mornington Railway wished to honour their agreement with the Langi Morgala Museum to restore a locomotive with the number K177.
K 191		1946	Victorian Railways Newport Workshops	Stored dismantled	Formerly plinthed in a park in Wangaratta. Brought to Mooorooduc in 2001 for eventual restoration, its boiler is now in use in K163.

=== Diesel locomotives ===
Number	Image	Year built	Builder	Status	Notes
T 334		1956	EMD/clyde NSW	Operational	Was painted pink in 1986, painted pink again in 2026
T 411		1968	EMD/clyde NSW	Operational	has a 567C motor and was formerly painted in MTR Blue yellow and grey
W 241		1959	Tulloch Limited	Operational	Class leader
TC 1		Unknown	Unknown	Stored	Track Chief. Ex-BHP, is named Bob Parnell
TC 2		Unknown	Unknown	Stored	Track Chief. Spare parts for TC 1

=== Passenger carriages ===
Number	Image	Year built	Builder	Status	Notes
3 ABL		12 April 1900	Victorian Railways Newport Workshops, Mower & Party	Stored	
10 ABE		2 September 1909	Victorian Railways Newport Workshops	Under Overhaul	
34 BE		7 October 1910	Victorian Railways Newport Workshops	Stored Pending Restoration	Fitted with air conditioning
45 BE		23 March 1910	Victorian Railways Newport Workshops	Stored Pending Overhaul	
58 BES		28 July 1910	Victorian Railways Newport Workshops, Bell & Party	Stored	
86 BPL		18 June 1921	Victorian Railways Newport Workshops	Stored	
6 BCPL		7 April 1922	Victorian Railways Newport Workshops	Stored	Formerly was at McDonalds in Southland
24 AW		5 July 1918	Victorian Railways Newport Workshops, Scott & Party	Operational	
27 BU		27 February 1914	Victorian Railways Newport Workshops, Fowles & Party	Operational	
63 ABW		13 August 1926	Victorian Railways Newport Workshops, Scott & Party	Stored Pending Restoration	
65 AW		22 October 1926	Victorian Railways Newport Workshops, Gaulton & Party	Operational	
152 W		1883	Johnson & Co., Melbourne	Stored	Workmen's Sleeper
257 W		1883	Bevan, P	Stored	Workmen's Sleeper
278 W		16 April 1886	Pickles	Stored	Workmen's Sleeper
98 G		12 July 1944	Victorian Railways Newport Workshops	Operational	Tait dual lighting trailer. Used for birthday parties
ACN33		16 September 1982	VicRail Newport Workshops	Operational	
BRN49		2 July 1983	VicRail Newport Workshops	Operational	
BN25		July 2 1982	VicRail Newport Workshops	Operational	
BZN275		1962	VicRail Newport Workshops	Operational	
1946T		6 May 1976	Victorian Railways Newport Workshops	Operational	Hitachi trailer
Melville		30 April 1901	Victorian Railways Newport Workshops	Operational	State Car No.2

=== Vans ===
Number	Image	Year built	Builder	Status	Notes
5 CV		26 June 1906	Victorian Railways Newport Workshops, Herbert & Party	Stored Pending Restoration	
7 CV		26 June 1906	Victorian Railways Newport Workshops, Herbert & Party	Under Restoration	
2 CW		28 November 1913	Victorian Railways Newport Workshops	Stored	
17 CW		25 June 1935	Victorian Railways Newport Workshops	Stored Pending Overhaul	
35 C		1 January 1892	Australian Rolling Stock Co. Spotswood	Stored	
604 ZD		19 December 1928	Victorian Railways Newport Workshops	Stored Pending Overhaul	
364 ZL		21 October 1912	Victorian Railways Newport Workshops	Out of Service	Stationary vehicle for Ticket Office at Moorooduc Station
457 ZL		20 June 1914	Victorian Railways Newport Workshops, Rankin & Party	Operational	
586 ZL		30 March 1928	Victorian Railways Newport Workshops, Grigg & Party	Scrapped	

== See also ==
- Tourist and Heritage Railways Act
