= Mornington railway line =

Railway line in Melbourne, Australia

Mornington

Overview
- Status: Tourist railway operated by the Mornington Railway Preservation Society
- Connecting lines: Stony Point line

Service
- Type: Tourist railway

History
- Opened: 10 September 1889
- Reopened: 1991
- Closed: 15 June 1981

Technical
- Number of tracks: Single track

The Mornington railway line, in Melbourne, Australia, was a rural railway branching off from the Stony Point railway line at Baxter. The line had a life of 92 years, opening in 1889, and closing in 1981.

== History ==
=== Early history ===
In 1881, a line branching from the Gippsland railway line at Caulfield was opened to Mordialloc. It was extended to Frankston in 1882 and Baxter in 1888. From there branches were constructed to Hastings and Mornington. The Baxter to Mornington line was officially opened on 10 September 1889. In 1922, the Frankston line was electrified in two stages: first to Mordialloc in June and thence to Frankston by August.

When opened, the Mornington line had two stations: the terminus at Mornington and an intermediate station Moorooduc. In 1925, there was local agitation to extend electrification from Frankston railway station to Mornington, which was rejected as being unprofitable

Between 1920 and 1930, Rail Motor Stopping Place (RMSP) 16 was situated at the level crossing over the Nepean Highway (known as the Point Nepean Road at the time) in Mornington, but had been closed by 1940. Between 1930 and 1940, Mornington Racecourse station was opened on the Melbourne side of RMSP 16, approximately halfway to Moorooduc. Between 1960 and 1970, Mornington Racecourse was renamed to Tanti Park and, between 1970 and 1980, RMSP 16 was reopened, consisting of two small passenger platforms, one on each side of the Nepean Highway. The Nepean Highway level crossing was fitted with flashing light signals in 1939, replacing the previous wig wag signal.

Periodic agitation for the electrification of both the Mornington and Stony Point lines continued throughout the 1930s, and the post war period, often associated with a counter proposal for a more direct second line to be constructed between Frankston and Mornington via Mount Eliza. In 1948, the Victorian Parliamentary Public Works Committee held an inquiry into the electrification of the Mornington line, and there was local advocacy for the extension of the line to Dromana.

=== Closure ===
The passenger service was cancelled during World War II, being reinstated between Frankston and Mornington in September 1966. There were a number of proposals to end the passenger service in the late 1970s. In 1978, people protested against repairs along the line and a replacement bus service was established. The diesel-electric railmotor used on the line was replaced with a Walker railmotor RM22 in November that year. On 10 December 1978, RM22 left Mornington at 7:20pm and returned to Melbourne. However, the transport minister acceded to local demand, and a rail service, using RM55, was reinstated on 9 April 1979, running the passenger service for more than two years.

On 29 February 1979, a special race train was introduced, hauled by T388. That was to be the last special train allowed to operate along the line by VicRail. 300 protesters prevented the train from departing, forcing it to remain in Mornington until the following afternoon.

In the wake of the Lonie Report in 1981, VicRail prepared to abandon many passenger services and close many stations, including the Mornington line. The last summer Sunday service to Mornington ran on 19 April 1981. On 16 March, the Association of Railway Enthusiasts (ARE) ran a steam tour to Mornington and Stony Point, hauled by K190, which was the last steam train to travel to the original Mornington railway station terminus. On 20 May, RM55 ran the last rail service to Mornington, driven by Brian Higgins. The train departed from Mornington at 1:23 pm that day, but suffered engine problems, requiring the use of a replacement bus service. RM55 was taken to Melbourne after arriving at Frankston.

On 6 June 1981, a railway enthusiast group ran a special service from Crib Point to HMAS Cerberus, Mornington and Stony Point, using RM59. On 12 June 1981 a Hastings Primary School train ran a return trip from Hastings to Mornington. This was the last train to run between Baxter and the original Mornington station site. Three days later, the Mornington line was officially declared out of service and a new bus timetable was established. The line remained disused until 1989 when the termite infested Mornington station building was abruptly demolished. The line between Nepean Highway and Mornington was removed in 1991 and, in 1999, the infrastructure at Mornington station was demolished, with a shopping centre being erected on the site.

=== Restoration ===
The remainder of the line lay idle until 1984 when the Mornington Railway Preservation Society was formed with the long-term ambition of restoring a tourist railway service along the line. They restored a Victorian Railways K class steam locomotive and, in 1991, leased the line between Baxter and Nepean Highway. In 1997, their rolling stock was transferred to the current base at Moorooduc, with tourist trains operating along the line between Moorooduc and a new Mornington station, located south-west of the original Mornington station.
