= V & SAR Pullman Carriages =

Railway carriages from Australia

Macedon and Mount Lofty
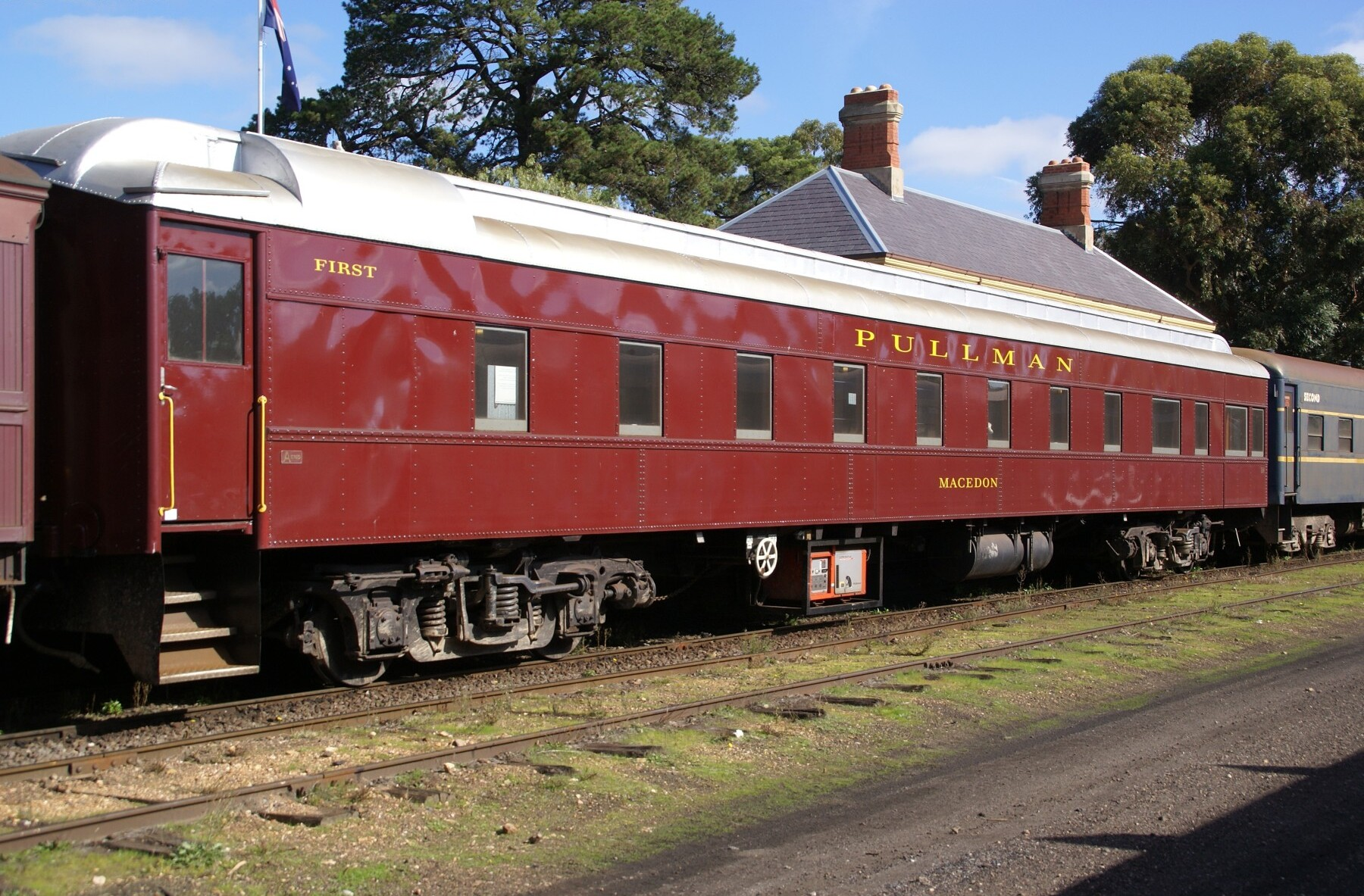
- Pullman car Macedon as a first class sitting carriage at Maldon on the VGR in 2014
- Manufacturer: Pullman Company
- Constructed: 1928
- Operators: Victorian Railways and South Australian Railways

Specifications
- Car body construction: Steel
- Car length: 81 ft 11 3/4 in (24.99 m) over diaphragms 80 ft 1 1/2 in (24.42 m) over buffer beams 55 ft 0 in (16.76 m) over bogie centres
- Width: 9 ft 10 1/8 in (3.00 m) over roof 9 ft 7 1/2 in (2.93 m) over body
- Height: 13 ft 8 3/16 in (4.17 m)
- Weight: 75 LT 11 cwt 2 qtr (76.79 t); 10 LT 16 cwt 0 qtr (10.97 t) per bogie 1 LT 5 cwt 2 qtr (1.30 t) per wheelset
- Track gauge: 5 ft 3 in (1,600 mm)

Notes/references
- Dimensions above are sourced from Stewien (2011).

Three Pullman carriages - two sleeping and one dining car - were purchased by the Victorian and South Australian Railways in 1928, for use on The Overland in conjunction with the E type carriages.

== History ==
In 1927 the South Australian Railways' Commissioner Webb organised the purchase of three carriages from the Pullman Car & Manufacturing Company of America. There was one dining car, with a landed cost of £22000 including £9500 of import fees, and two sleeping cars, for a cost of £19,378 each. Webb had intended for these cars to be used as pattern vehicles for an extensive locally-built fleet, which required one dining and one sleeping carriage. At the same time and as part of the same order, the Victorian Railways was induced to purchase Macedon. However, the locally-built carriages never eventuated. Paperwork from the time notes that the cars were purchased from overseas "to meet urgent demands for increased sleeping car accommodation." It is not known whether the South Australian Railways ever received the full collection of engineering tracings for the Pullman cars; by 27 March 1929 only about three-quarters of the documents had been delivered, and both Railways held off on making their final payments until April 1929, despite a steadily increasing interest bill. This caused the Victorian Railways' expense to increase to £20096 14s 10d, and presumably the South Australian portion increased at a similar rate.

The two sleeping cars were Lot 6111, Plan 7143, (Note: The 7000-series plan number means the cars were never operated by the Pullman Company.) with 10 compartments and a side corridor each; the first such cars that the company had built since 1914, making an unusual order. The dining car was Lot 6112, Plan 7144.

In both cases the layout and fittings were to the latest standards of the time.

The cars were constructed with steel and had a concrete floor to lower the centre of gravity and improve stability, giving a total weight of 76.7 long tons (77.9 t) spread across six axles.

Each car was individually railed from the Pullman Company's factory in Chicago to New York on standard gauge bogies, accompanied by their broad gauge bogies loaded on flat wagons, then sailed over to Australia as deck cargo. Mount Lofty and Adelaide left New York on 14 March 1928 aboard the Port Nicholson, arriving on 30 April 1928, followed by Macedon departing on 4 April 1928 and arriving at Port Adelaide in mid-May 1928. Both ships had travelled via the Panama Canal. Along for the journey was the Pullman Company's Assistant Mechanical Superintendent of the Chicago plant, whose role was to demonstrate the features and maintenance requirements of the new cars to local Railways' staff.

Macedon cost £19,377 15s 9d, Mount Lofty £19,497 18s 4d, and Adelaide had a cost at landing of £20,215 9s 1d. The difference in cost was due to shipping charges, and the cost of the two sleeping cars was split equally between the Victorian and South Australian railways, at £19437 17s 0d each; therefore the cost to the South Australian Railways, including Adelaide, was £39653 6s 1d. The contract was managed by the SAR, who collected Victoria's portion of the cost upfront.

The sleeping cars, Macedon and Mount Lofty, ran the whole length The Overland from Melbourne to Adelaide and return, and were jointly owned by both the Victorian and South Australian railways. The Dining car was named Adelaide and only ran on the South Australian portion of The Overland, being attached and detached to alternate trains mid-trip, while the Victorian side's dining requirements were handled by Victoria's dining cars such as Avoca and Hopkins.

Adelaide and Mount Lofty were both owned fully by the South Australian Railways, while the Victorian Railways owned Macedon. Both would eventually proceed to the Australian National-operated Tea and Sugar Train, remaining in service until 1997.

=== Sleeping cars ===
Marketing Van
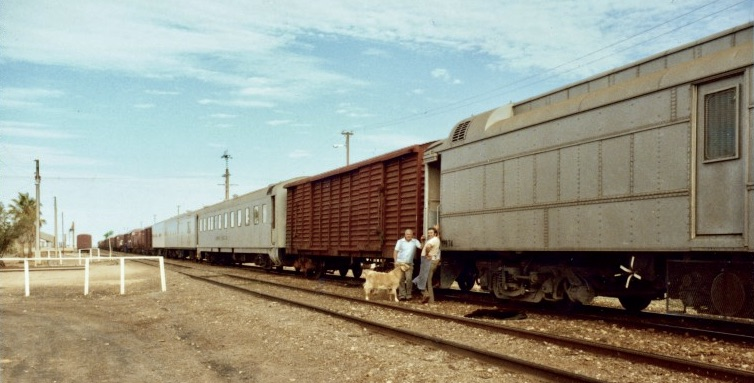
- VPB74 on the Tea and Sugar Train at Rawlinna in 1982
- Manufacturer: Pullman Company
- Refurbished: 1979
- Number built: 2
- Number preserved: 2
- Fleet numbers: 74, 328
- Capacity: 830 L (182.57 imp gal; 219.26 US gal) fuel tank 300 L (65.99 imp gal; 79.25 US gal) engine stand
- Operator: Australian National

Specifications
- Car body construction: Steel
- Car length: 24,358 mm (958.98 in) over coupling points 24,766 mm (975.04 in) over coupling points
- Width: 2,970 mm (116.93 in) over steps 3,126 mm (123.07 in) over handrails
- Height: 4,200 mm (165.35 in)
- Floor height: 1,292 mm (50.87 in)
- Entry: Steps
- Weight: 76 LT 0 cwt 0 qtr (77.22 t)
- Power supply: Onboard alternator
- HVAC: Yes
- Coupling system: Janney coupler
- Track gauge: 1,435 mm (4 ft 8 1/2 in)

Notes/references
- Dimensions above are sourced from Comrails.

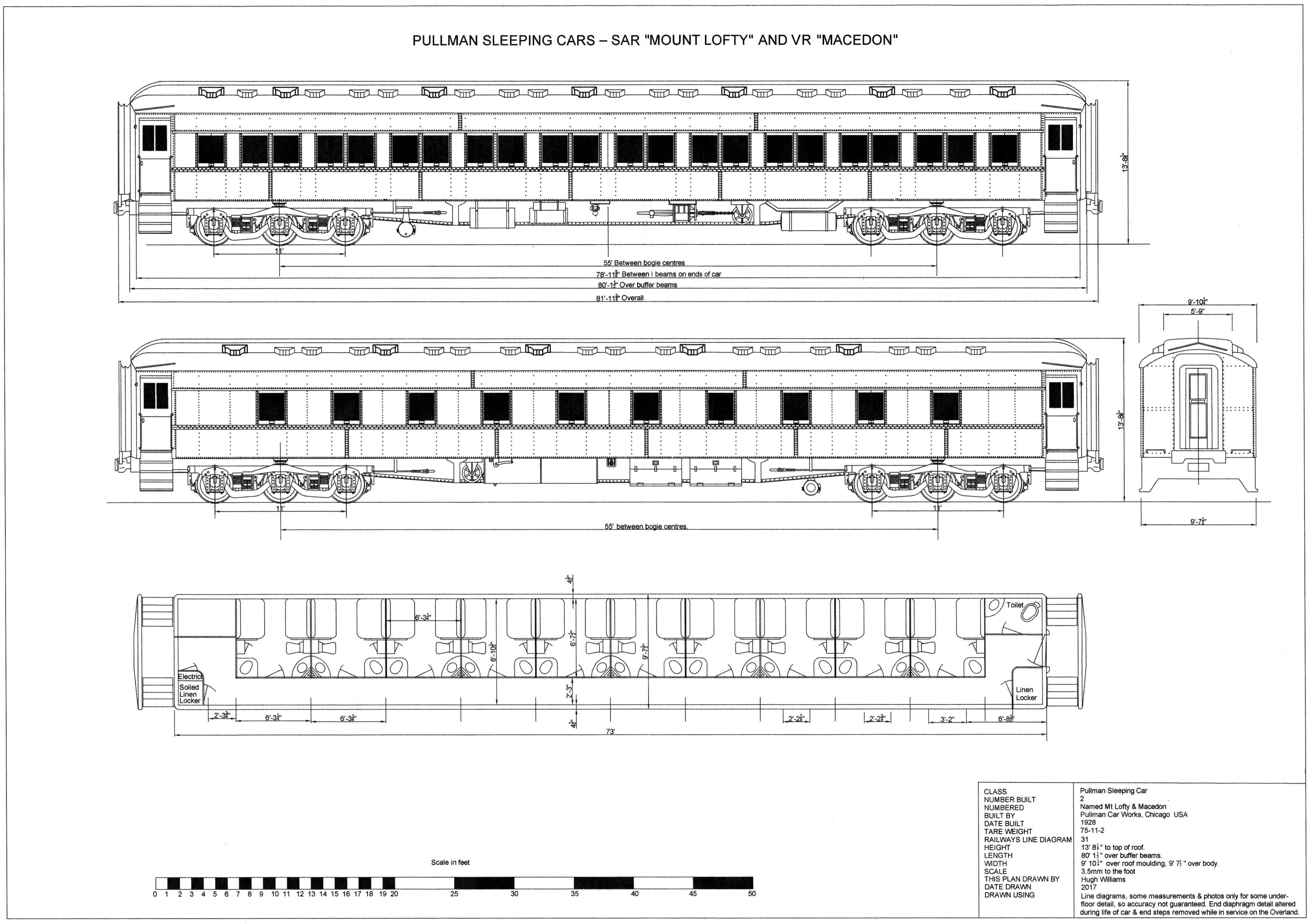
Diagram of sleeping cars Macedon and Mount Lofty

The two sleeping cars were each fitted with twin-berth cabins, individually equipped with washrooms, wall bracket lamps, wardrobes, hot and cold water, a fan, chair, steam heating and a shoe locker that was accessible from the corridor. To account for the excessive weight of the carriages, passengers were charged an additional £5s for overnight accommodation. Each compartment had two windows, matched to a single window on the corridor side. The bogies were of a double-bolster equalising type with disc wheels, contemporary to American designs at the time; though the disc wheels may have been a first for Australia. Stewien says the cars arrived in Adelaide with both automatic couplers and buffers, but that the couplers were temporarily swapped out for screw couplers pending conversion of the rest of the fleet; Banger (2007) mentions photos of Mount Lofty at the Chicago plant with the screw couplers already fitted.

The Pullman company had standard designs for its sleeping cars, and at the time of construction most sleeping cars were at least partially open-plan rather than compartments for cheaper construction costs. The construction of Macedon and Mount Lofty was unusual in having ten complete compartments.

On delivery from Pullman the cars were fitted with steps down to ground level and pipes for steam heating from adjacent vehicles, but this equipment was removed before they entered service. It has been hypothesised that the cars were only piped for "through" steam heating, but a photo taken at the Pullman works on 7 February 1928 apparently did show a steam exhaust grill in a compartment, below the central window pillar. The steps, at least, were absent when the cars were lifted from the Port Nicholson at Port Adelaide, but were either refitted or replaced at a later date.

The cars were used on alternate services (one each way) between Melbourne and Adelaide, but their excessive weight of over 4 LT (4.1 t) per passenger meant an operating cost more than 60% higher than older E type sleeping cars. The cars proved popular in service and were often booked out nearly two weeks in advance of each trip. Both factors were partially managed by increasing the charge for Pullman berths on 1 February 1929 by £0 5s, on top of the £1 charged for a sleeping berth and the regular ticket price. Any berths still available on departure from Serviceton towards Melbourne could be allocated to Victorian passengers from Kaniva, Nhill, Dimboola, Horsham, Murtoa or Stawell for a fee of £12s; a similar arrangement existed for westbound services, where the charge for stations from Wolseley to Adelaide was £10. From the same date, and in line with international practice, two people aged 14 or over could share the same berth by mutual agreement with for an additional fare of £12s 6d; children under that age did not have to pay when sharing.

The two sleeping cars were used from introduction until the Great Depression, then stored from 1 September 1930 to 14 October 1935. As with Adelaide, it is hypothesised that the excessive weight of the cars meant that their removal would allow twice as many, higher capacity, timber-bodied sitting cars to be attached to the train and thus remove the need for a second division (Note: "Second Division" of a train means a second departure carrying overflow passengers and luggage that could not be conveyed by the normal train due to power or length constraints.) of the express service.

When the cars re-entered service they were then repainted hawthorn green to match The Overland stock, but Banger (2007) notes that each car represented 15% of the tonnage the new Overland service while carrying only 5% of the passenger accommodation. (Note: The Victorian Railways had started using the term Overland from June 1926, but the South Australian Railways did not introduce the title of The Overland until 4 November 1935.) The Overland was restored to seven weekly trips each waty from 4 July 1936. It is not known whether the cars were, until that point, still painted in the standard Pennsylvania Railroad red livery. New carpets and upholstery were ordered from Pullman in mid-1937, despatched on 22 October that year, and probably fitted to the cars in 1938. The order was for 170 yd (155.45 m) of 50 in (1.27 m) of upholstery fabric.

Both cars were fitted with automatic couplers c. 1936.

From 1 April 1940, wartime conditions required that both cars be withdrawn from service due to their excessive weight to capacity ratio; luxuries like comfort had to be disposed of and capacity maximised. Mount Lofty was stored at Islington Railway Workshops, and Macedon may have been stored at North Melbourne Workshops, though the latter is not clear and Stewien (2011) implies but does not state that it, too, was stored at Islington. Both cars remained in storage through and after the war.

==== Macedon ====
Macedon departed New York on 4 April 1928, and entered service on The Overland on 10 June the same year. After final withdrawal as a sleeping car in 1940 it was kept in storage, until it was sold to the Commonwealth Railways on 27 May 1950 for £8000, at the same time as Victorian Railways' dining car Hopkins.

On 21 July 1950 it entered service as AR^{C}74, painted the standard Commonwealth Railways' chocolate and cream, and running with its original six-wheel bogies converted to standard gauge. It was used to maintain capacity while releasing timber sleeping carriages for fitting of air conditioning equipment; the plan had been to fit ARC74 with the same facility, but time pressures made that impractical. It did, however, have one vestibule enclosed and fitted with a shower and toilet, and in this form its tare weight decreased to 73 LT 5 cwt 0 qtr (74.43 t).

It was originally used as a first class, non-airconditioned sleeping carriage, then when the standard gauge line opened to Marree on 27 July 1957 it was used on the opening standard gauge train. After that sighting it probably remained in service on the Trans-Australian Railway, for up to a decade, being transferred to the Marree line by September 1967 and possibly as early as 1964. In 1964 the car was repainted maroon and silver, with a large "CR" emblem on each side. On this train AR^{C}74 was particularly useful as it could be converted from sleeping to sitting accommodation during school holidays, unlike most passenger cars worked by the Commonwealth Railways which were sleeping only.

It is understood that it was used for some time as a dormitory car for drivers of road trucks being piggy-backed across the Nullarbor.

In 1973 AR^{C}74 was withdrawn from service for conversion, but delays due to lack of funding left the car in a partially stripped condition. It eventually re-entered service on 29 October 1979 as VPB74, joining classmate VPB328 on the Tea and Sugar Train as a travelling store, using new Commonwealth-type four-wheel bogies. The original Pullman bogies were re-used as transfer bogies for locomotives undergoing maintenance, and were last sighted at Peterborough in December 1987.> On 23 November 1984 it was reclassed to OPB, and continued operating until it was damaged by fire at some point in the mid-1990s.> The Tea and Sugar was cancelled in 1997. On 8 November 1997 it was sold, with the freight side of the Australian National business, to the Australian Southern Railroad, and in June 1999 it was apparently either planned to be, or moved, to Parkeston. It was expected to be removed from its bogies (those being re-used on some other project), while the body would be grounded and used as a delivery base.

==== Mount Lofty ====
Mount Lofty first carried passengers on 19 May 1928. After its second withdrawal in 1940 it was held for a year or so, then transferred to Islington Railway Workshops. In January 1950, Victoria's share in the car was sold to the South Australian Railways, at the same time that Maceedon was sold to the Commonwealth Railways. At some point consideration was given to converting it to an all-sitting car, with one compartment partially converted and another stripped out before the idea was dropped, partially due to the weight of the car. It was stored in the open at the south end of Islington Railway Workshops, initially with classmate Adelaide until 1954.

Commonwealth Railways had already purchased Macedon and Hopkins from the Victorian Railways in 1950 and numbered those two carriages 74 and 75, reserving the number 73 in case they later acquired Mount Lofty, but the sale had apparently fallen through at the time.

On 25 September 1964 Mount Lofty was sold to the Commonwealth Railways, being forwarded to Port Pirie on 30 September then to Port Augusta railway station. It was still painted in The Overland hawthorn green livery with The Overland emblazoned on the sides and Sleeper at each door, though much faded due to decades of storage. Unlike Macedon and the E type cars, it was not marked "V&SA".

When delivered, the Commonwealth Railways kept Mount Lofty in storage at the Port Augusta workshops for an extended period. It was sighted in May 1977 still painted in Overland green livery, generally in original condition externally except mounted on freight bogies, and with the interior stripped.

In May 1977 it was moved from storage for a complete internal rebuild, with all compartments stripped out. The car was then converted to a "Marketing Van" for use on the Tea and Sugar Train and it re-entered service on 1 June 1979 as VBP328, painted grey, fitted with air conditioning and mounted on Commonwealth four-wheel bogies. On 23 November 1984 it was reclassed to OPB328, and continued operating until the Tea and Sugar was cancelled in August 1996, and transferred to Australian Southern Railroad on 8 November 1997. In 2004 it was sold to the Australian Loco and Railway Carriage Company; as of September 2006 it was stored at the Tailem Bend turntable, and in August 2010 expressions of interest were called for its sale.

=== Dining car Adelaide ===
Adelaide
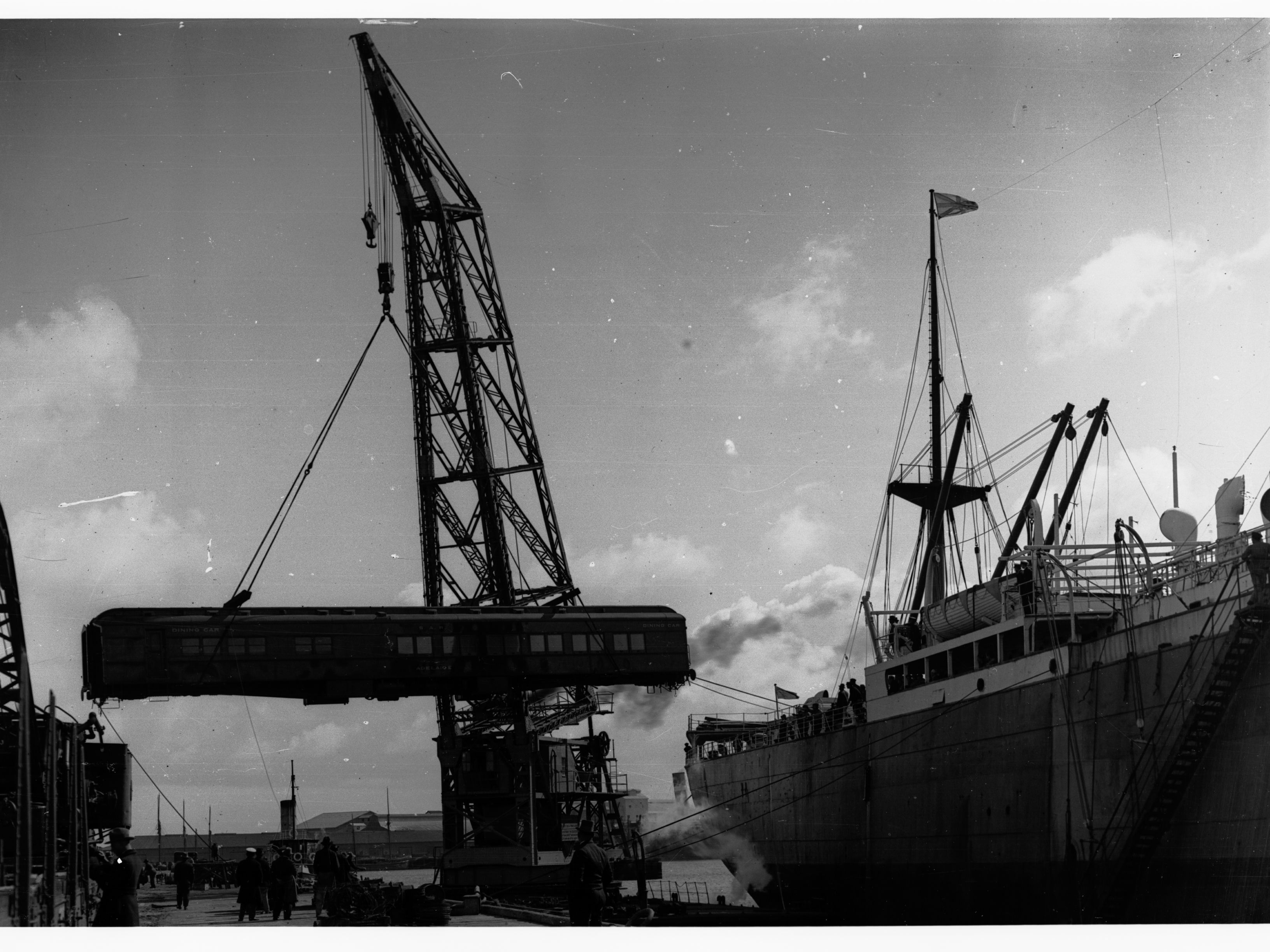
- Dining car Adelaide being unloaded from the Port Nicholson at Port Adelaide in 1928
- Manufacturer: Pullman Company
- Constructed: 1928
- Operator: South Australian Railways

Specifications
- Car body construction: Steel
- Car length: 82 ft 11 3/4 in (25.29 m) over diaphragms 81 ft 1 1/2 in (24.73 m) over buffer beams 56 ft 0 in (17.07 m) over bogie centres
- Width: 9 ft 10 1/8 in (3.00 m) over roof 9 ft 7 1/2 in (2.93 m) over body
- Height: 13 ft 8 3/16 in (4.17 m)
- Weight: 76 LT 6 cwt 3 qtr (77.56 t); 10 LT 17 cwt 0 qtr (11.02 t) per bogie 1 LT 5 cwt 2 qtr (1.30 t) per wheelset
- Track gauge: 5 ft 3 in (1,600 mm)

Notes/references
- Dimensions above are sourced from Stewien (2011).

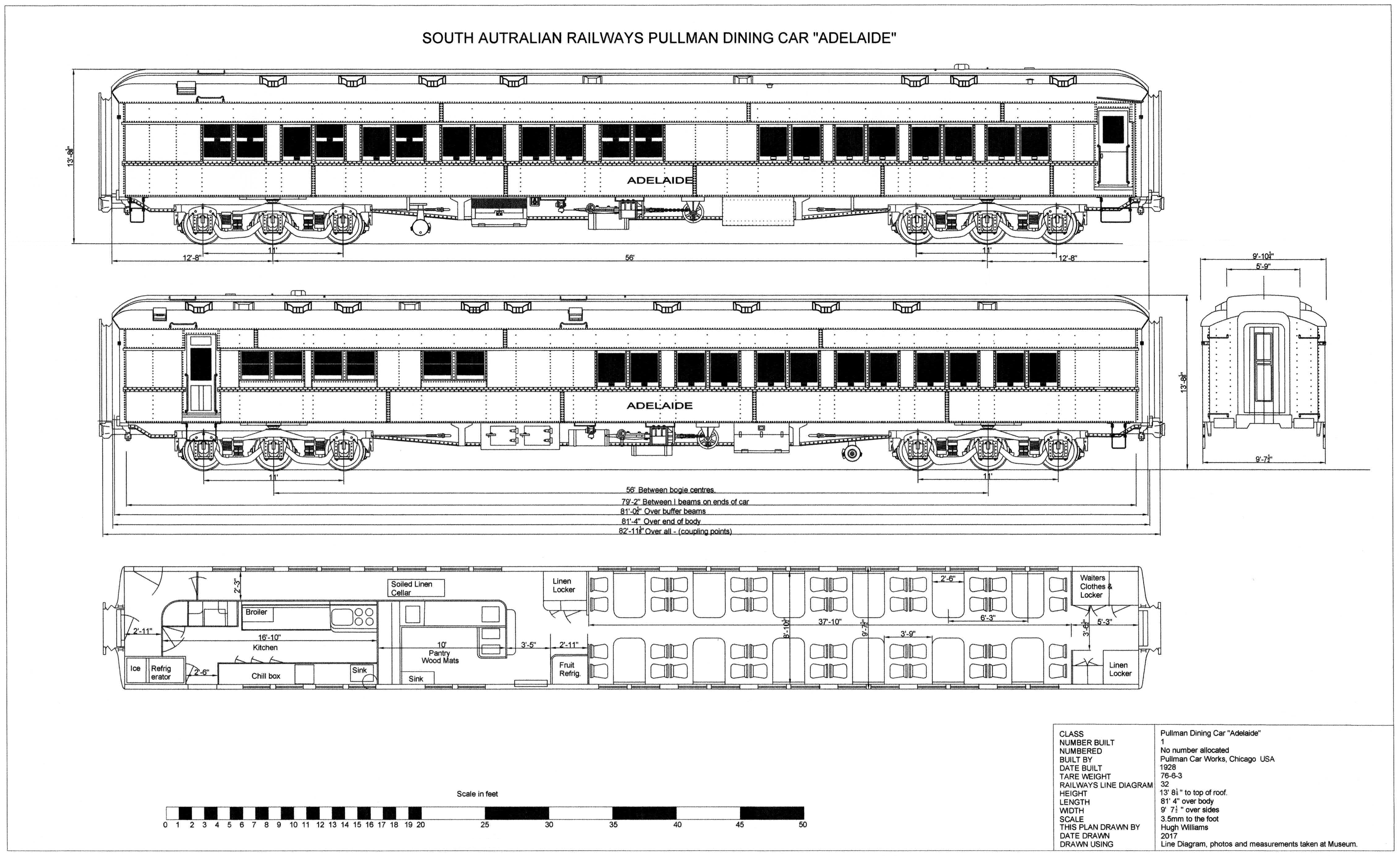
Diagram of dining car Adelaide

Unlike the two sleeping cars, Adelaide was delivered in a not-quite-complete fashion. Perhaps to save on shipping costs, the concrete floor was mixed at Islington Railway Workshops under the supervision of a Pullman Company agent, who insisted that the whole slab be cast in a single shift to avoid any joints or possible fracture points. In the days before mechanised concrete mixing this required a team of workers to get the whole slab laid in one day; they started early and finished the work by moonlight at 10 pm.

Unlike the two sleeping cars, with the exception of the broad gauge bogies Adelaide was a standard Pullman dining car with no special features added or removed.

The dining car Adelaide was first tested between Adelaide and Murray Bridge on 16 May 1928, on a trip organised by Commissioner Webb for his 50th birthday and also celebrating 50 years of the South Australian Railways, and it was accepted onto the rolling stock register on 19 May. It first appeared on the Melbourne Express two days later, running from Adelaide at 4:30 pm. For the first week the carriage ran through to Melbourne, to permit inspection by the Victorian Railways representatives. After that, it was regularly rostered on the 4:30 pm departure from Adelaide only to Serviceton on the border, where it was detached for transplant to the opposing Adelaide Express train from Melbourne. The initial service to diners was priced at £5s for an eastbound dinner service, or £3s for a westbound breakfast service. The dinner price is noted as being twice that of the previously-offered three-course meal at Murray Bridge railway station, which led to "a storm of protest".

The dining car compartment was 38 ft (12 m) long, and could seat 48 diners at twelve tables, six either side of the central corridor. The tables were made of walnut and the chairs from mahogany. The initial menu featured:

- Potage ecossaise
- Fried whiting au citron
- Lamb cutlets milannaise
- Roast sirloin beef and horseradish sauce
- Roast chicken and bacon (all above with vegetables)
- Apple pie and cream
- Wine jelly
- Cheese and salad
- Assorted fruits and cakes

Each month, 700 lb (320 kg) of meat (including 170 lb (80 kg) of bacon and 55 lb (20 kg) of ham), 660 loaves of bread, 214 dozen eggs, 230 lb (100 kg) of butter, 235 lb (110 kg) of sugar, 155 imp gal (700 L; 190 US gal) of milk, 6 long hundredweight (670 lb) potatoes, 45 lb (20 kg) of tea and 54 lb (20 kg) coffee had to be supplied, along with vast quantities of fish, polutry and vegetables. Two crews were required to operate each trip, one working the outbound and the other working the inbound trip.

The car remained in service on the Melbourne Express until arrival of service no.240, Up Melbourne Express, in Adelaide on the morning of 1 August 1930. From that date the dining car facility was discontinued due to the downturn of passenger traffic, a consequence of the Great Depression, saving £3,000 annually. The car was then kept in storage for a few years.

From 13 May 1935 the timings of the Melbourne-Adelaide express service, shortly thereafter renamed The Overland, were adjusted to make use of Webb's "Big Power" 500 class and 600 class steam locomotives. The dining car was used from Adelaide to Murray Bridge on the down journey, and for breakfast on the Up journey, being detached and attached at Tailem Bend when the locomotives were swapped over.

In 1937 the line between Port Pirie and Port Augusta was converted from 3 ft 6 in (1,067 mm) to 5 ft 3 in (1,600 mm), and the necessary timetable changes had a downstream impact that required rescheduling of The Overland, from 6 June 1938. The new train from Adelaide towards Melbourne departed at 7:30 pm instead of 6:35 pm, and the new train from Melbourne to Adelaide arrived at 8:25 am instead of 9 am. These changes made use of the dining car impractical in both directions, so that portion of the service was discontinued. Additionally, the weight of Adelaide precluded the use of two passenger-carrying cars, so its removal increased the potential revenue per train-mile.

From 1938 the car was stored outside at the south end of the Islington Railway Workshops, where it was joined by Mount Lofty when the Pullman sleeping cars were removed from The Overland due to their low passengers per ton capacity.

Adelaide was only used sporadically for the next 25 years, on special services such as Departmental and Parliamentary special services towards the south-east of South Australia, or to Terowie and Port Pirie. It was apparently moved from Islington to storage in Adelaide around 1954. After a three-year period without turning a wheel, it made an appearance on an Australian Railway Historical Society excursion train to Gladstone on 21 May 1961, and it was then used frequently on similar trips both for that and other organisations. It also appeared on the train between Adelaide and Port Pirie on 23 July 1963, when the Cafeteria Car was temporarily out of service. Outside of those events the car was generally stored in the North Car Shed of Adelaide rail yard. In 1975 Adelaide remained the property of the STA when most other assets were transferred to Australian National Railways. In 1978 it was noted as having been used for forty different events. As of early 1985, Adelaide was still used on special dinner trains.

== Disposal and preservation ==
On 6 September 1988, Adelaide was leased and transferred to the Port Dock Museum, where it is now preserved. It is considered to be unique, as probably the only remaining example in the world of a Pullman dining car that retains its original wood stoves, ice-chests, interior paint work and fittings. The only notable changes have been the replacement of the original Royal Wilton carpet in the 1960s, and some of the linoleum in the kitchen area.

In 2004 Macedon was sold to a private consortium of Victorians, and it left Port Augusta on 15 September 2004, being transported by Westcombes Heavy Haulage to Steamrail Victoria's depot in Newport Workshops where it arrived three days later. By 2 November 2004 it was undergoing restoration. The external restoration was completed by March 2012, and it has since been moved to the Victorian Goldfields Railway.
