= Victorian Railways Long W type carriage =

Long sitting cars
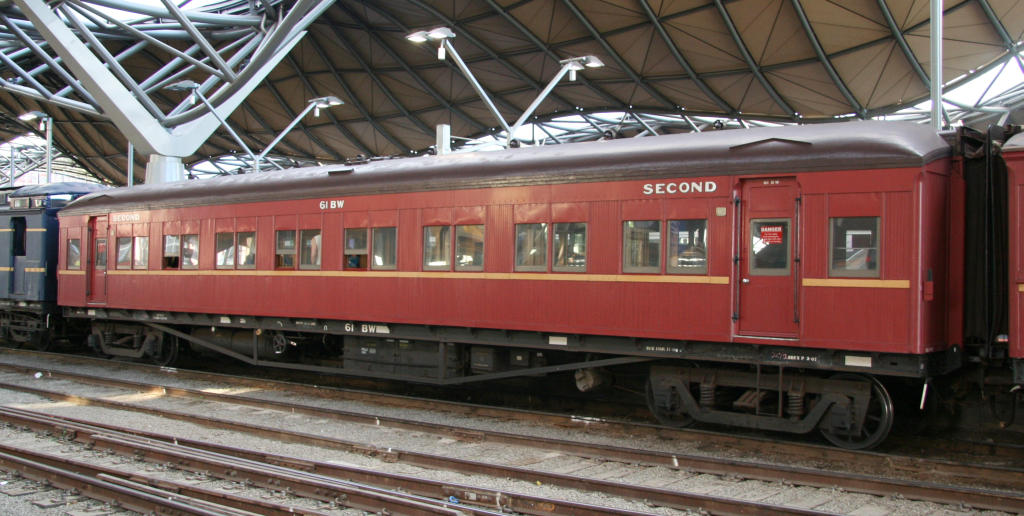
- Elliptical roofed 61BW as preserved by Steamrail Victoria
- Manufacturer: Victorian Railways
- Built at: Newport Workshops
- Constructed: 1926–1927
- Entered service: 1926–1986
- Number built: 9x AW, 5x ABW, 11x BW
- Number preserved: 60, 64 & 65AW 61 & 63ABW 60–61, 63–64, 66–68 & 70BW
- Number scrapped: 12
- Fleet numbers: 60-68AW, 60-63ABW, 65ABW & 60-70BW; later 71-79BW, 80-82BW, 1-9VFW & 31-34MT
- Capacity: 60 1st class passengers (AW) 26 1st class & 34 2nd class passengers (ABW) 68 2nd class passengers (BW)
- Operator: various heritage operators

Specifications
- Car body construction: Timber
- Car length: 64 ft 0 3/4 in (19.53 m) over body; 67 ft 2 in (20.47 m) over pulling lines
- Width: 10 ft 0 in (3.05 m)
- Height: 13 ft 0 7/8 in (3.98 m)
- Maximum speed: 70 mph (113 km/h)
- Weight: 32 LT 10 cwt 0 qtr (33.02 t) (AW) 33 LT 5 cwt 0 qtr (33.78 t) (ABW) 32 LT 7 cwt 0 qtr (32.87 t) (BW)
- Axle load: 8 LT 2 cwt 2 qtr (8.26 t) (AW) 8 LT 6 cwt 1 qtr (8.45 t) (ABW) 8 LT 1 cwt 3 qtr (8.22 t) (BW)
- Bogies: W type at 49 ft 3 1/4 in (15.02 m) centres
- Braking system: Westinghouse air brakes
- Coupling system: Autocoupler
- Track gauge: 5 ft 3 in (1,600 mm) & 4 ft 8 1/2 in (1,435 mm) standard gauge

The W type carriages were wooden passenger carriages used on the railways of Victoria, Australia.

== History ==
Following World War I patronage on the Victorian Railways increased significantly, and there were insufficient high capacity carriages for the busiest routes. To overcome the problem, the W design was adjusted, with a longer and wider body, to produce the Long W series. The vehicles entered service from 1926.

== Design and construction ==
The 1926 cars were 64 feet 0 3/4 inch (19.53 m) long over couplers and 10 ft (3.05 m) wide. They retained the curved (arched) style of roof, as previously employed on the last fifteen short W cars.

The single-class passenger vehicles had one compartment reserved for ladies and two compartments reserved for smoking. They were also fitted with single-gender lavatories at each end, and vestibules (with lock-able doors) for walking through to other cars in a given train. There was a water fountain located about halfway down the corridor in each car.

== Details ==
=== AW cars ===
The final batch of AW cars was constructed in 1926 and 1927, again fitted with curved roofs, and numbered 60AW to 68AW. Cars 69AW and 70AW were ordered but not built. These new cars were capable of seating 70 people across 7 compartments, again one reserved for ladies and two for smoking.

In December 1937, the newest carriages, 60AW to 68AW, were converted to add 2nd-class capacity to the system.

AW number	Newport Butty Gang	Entered service	BW number	Conversion date	AW number	Conversion date	VFW number	Conversion date	Final number	Conversion date	Off Register	Disposal
60 AW	Stubbins & Party	1926-06-18	71 BW	1938-02-11	60 AW	1956-03-31	1 VFW	1972-12-07	71 BW	1979-07-31	1984-08-22	Steamrail Victoria
61 AW	Tobitt & Party	1926-08-27	72 BW	1937-12-22	61 AW	1956-08-27	2 VFW	1972-11-30	72 BW	1980-02-xx	1983-05-16	Body sold privately to Frankston; subsequently sold to Forrest and converted to luxury accommodation.
62 AW	Stubbins & Party	1926-06-18	73 BW	1938-02-04	62 AW	1954-04-xx	3 VFW	1972-12-07	32 MT	1981-09-18	1984-11-21	Steamrail Victoria; stored at Tarp Shop until scrapped in October 2008.
63 AW	Gaulton & Party	1926-08-06	74 BW	1938-04-07	63 AW	1954-12-xx	4 VFW	1972-11-30	34 MT	1981-11-09	1984-08-22	Allocated to the Yarra Valley Railway, 19 July 1988. Awaiting restoration.
64 AW	McCann & Party	1927-04-08	75 BW	1938-04-06	64 AW	1956-06-29	5 VFW	1972-11-30	75 BW	1980-12-xx	1984-08-22	Steamrail Victoria, as 64AW.
65 AW	Gaulton & Party	1926-10-22	76 BW	1938-03-22	65 AW	1956-07-21	6 VFW	1972-11-30	33 MT	1981-09-16	1986-08-xx	Mornington Tourist Railway; restored as 65AW in 1990's.
66 AW	McCann & Party	1927-05-06	77 BW	1938-02-21	66 AW	1957-03-28	7 VFW	1972-11-23	n/a	n/a	1983-06-28	Sold to ARHS (ACT) in Canberra; used on tour trains 1983–1990, then static exhibit. Transferred to Junee in June 2004 for restoration.
67 AW	Stubbins & Party	1927-04-11	78 BW	1938-03-30	67 AW	1955-03-17	8 VFW	1972-12-07	78 BW	1979-12-xx	1983-12-15	Body transferred to Ferny Creek in 1996.
68 AW	Owen & Party	1927-04-13	79 BW	1938-04-02	68 AW	1957-03-06	9 VFW	1972-11-30	79 BW	1980-07-01	1985-03-15	Historical Register from 1 July 1983, allocated to Steamrail Victoria after March 1985 then reallocated to Yarra Valley Tourist Railway. Sold to Black Spur Caravan Park at Narbethong in 1993, and onsold to Woori Yallock circa 2005.

Note that 60AW-63AW and 65AW were built in 1926, while 64AW and 66AW-68AW were built in 1927.

They were converted from AW to BW in December 1937, then returned to AW in 1955–56, and to VFW in 1972. The VFW's that were reconverted back to BW's were converted in 1979, while VFW's 3, 4 & 6 were converted to MT's in 1983. 7VFW was sold in 1983 as well.

The VFW cars were painted in VR Blue and Gold, and were on 4 ft 8 1/2 in (1,435 mm) standard gauge. The cars were used for special excursion trips, generally scouting or defence 'specials' that required one train.

When the VFW cars were returned to broad gauge in the 1980s, bogies were sourced from scrapped Tait carriages.

=== ABW cars ===
From 1926, new curved roof, longer and wider stock was constructed and numbered 60ABW to 63ABW and 65ABW.

Although diagrams are not available, photos appear to indicate that the long version of the ABW design, with the curved roof, was set out internally in much the same way as the shorter carriages. A side-on view on the site indicates that three first-class compartments were included, much the same as the design of the short carriages, while four second-class compartments are provided in place of three. Therefore, it is likely that again, the outer two compartments were for smoking passengers, the inner two compartments were for ladies with a seat cut-out in each to make way for the door to the ladies' lavatory.

About 1981, cars 61ABW-63ABW were converted to 80BW-82BW and 65ABW was converted to 31MT. 60ABW had been sold to private owners in 1974.

The cars ran until the late 1980s when replaced by the then-new 'N' sets.

=== BW cars ===
In 1926 and 1927, cars 60BW to 70BW were added to the fleet. The additional width and length allowed them to seat 68 people; 64 across eight compartments, plus two in each vestibule.

In 1937/1938, nine were converted from AW cars, to the 71BW–79BW range. This was a result of an increase in second-class passengers. These were converted back to AW cars by the late 1950s. in 1980, the cars were again renumbered back to 71BW to 79BW, after spending some time as Standard Gauge 'second division' cars (the VFW class).

In 1981, BW 80–82 were converted from ABW 61–63, though it is not clear what the capacity of those vehicles was.

As a trial it was decided in 1982 to re-letter 67BW and 70BW to BWL, indicating the larger seating capacity. However, the trial was terminated and no more were re-lettered.

In the preservation era, 62BW and 80BW were retrofitted with small kiosks replacing a single compartment. It is thought that the kiosk in 62BW may have been taken from 7BV or a guards van.

62BW appeared in the season one episode "The Copy" of Round the Twist, and were used for filming of scenes between Healesville and Yarra Glen.

BW 72 & BW 79 exist in private ownership, BW 72 is used as accommodation in the town of Forrest in eastern Victoria.

=== 64AW, 64BW & 64ABW ===
An interesting note is that 64ABW was never built, and never entered service. Peter J. Vincent's theory is that 64ABW was not built in the 1926 batch because of confusion between the 64-foot length of the new cars, and carriage number 64.

Also, 64AW and 64BW each entered service a year after their batch-counterparts, in 1927 instead of 1926. This was supposedly to reduce confusion. However, an extra ABW was not needed, and so instead of building 64ABW, the VR probably used its parts to construct one of 65AW to 68AW. This cannot be substantiated, but is the most likely explanation.

== Sleeping cars ==
Long W Type Sleeping Cars
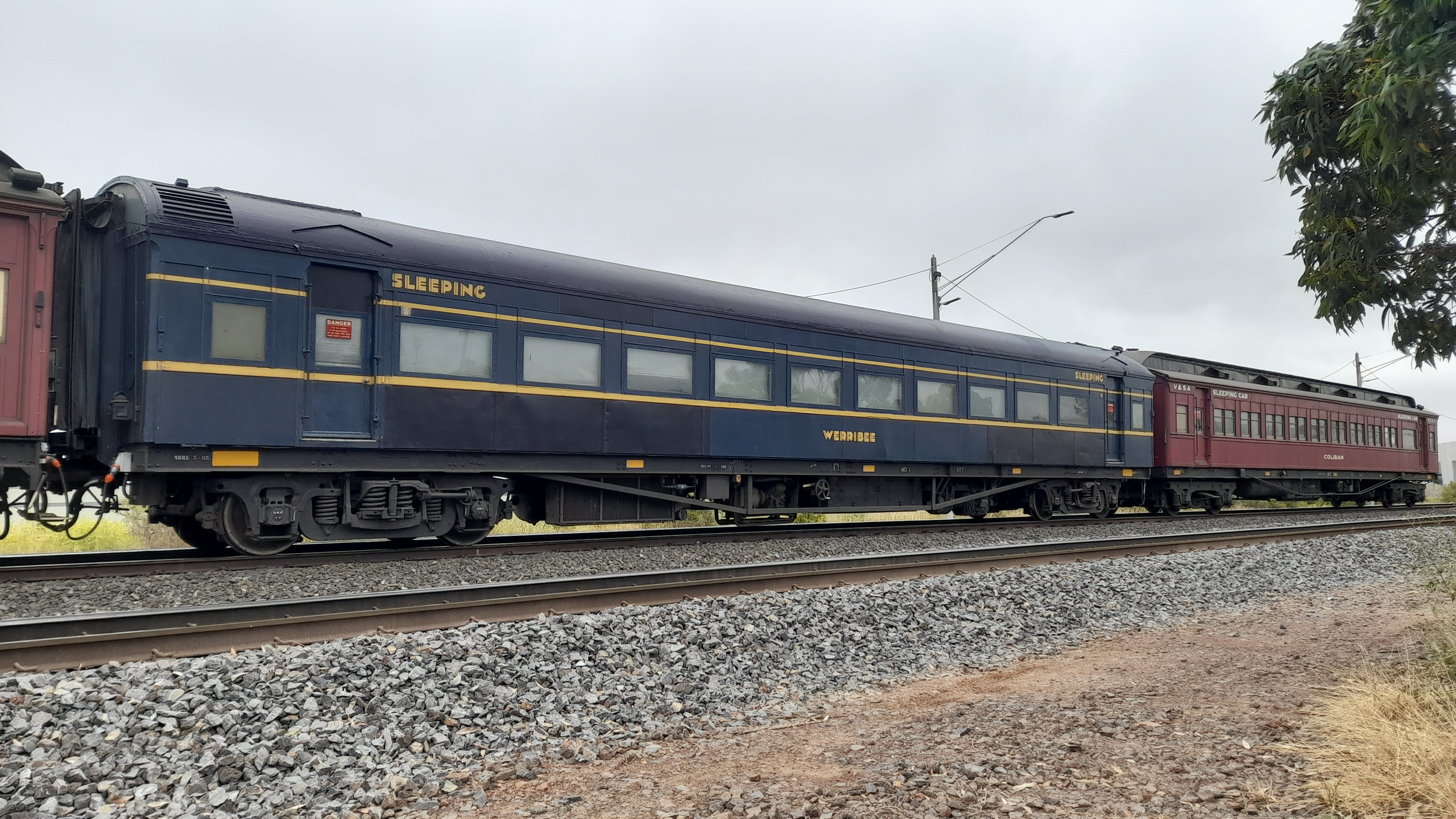
- Sleeping Car Werribee as preserved by Steamrail Victoria
- Manufacturers: Victorian Railways & South Australian Railways
- Built at: Newport Workshops & Islington Railway Workshops
- Constructed: 1928
- Entered service: 1928–1987
- Number built: 3
- Number preserved: All
- Capacity: 20 sleeping (Indi, Ovens and Werribee); 40 sitting (Indi, Ovens and Werribee)
- Operators: Victorian Railways, VicRail

Specifications
- Car body construction: 71 ft (21.64 m)
- Car length: 73 ft 8 1/4 in (22.46 m)
- Width: 9 ft 9 in (2.97 m)
- Height: 13 ft 3 in (4.04 m)
- Weight: 49 long tons (49.79 t) (without air conditioning); 52 long tons (52.83 t) (with air conditioning)

Three sleeping cars were constructed by the Victorian Railways in 1928, replacing former Joint Stock Mann Boudoir sleeping carriages that had been cascaded to the Mildura overnight services. Six of those cars had been built in 1886-1889 and used on the Intercolonial Express between Melbourne and Adelaide until the E type sleeping cars entered service, with four being divided between the South Australian and Victorian Railways in 1908 and the final two in 1920. Victoria acquired the cars formerly classed O2 and O3 (letter 'O' not numeral zero), and later O6, named Sleeper No.6, Mildura, and Latrobe. In 1911 No.6 and Mildura were renamed Avon and Kiewa respectively and converted to mixed sleeping and dining carriages, then joined by O6 as Latrobe in 1920; and in 1924 Kiewa reverted to a full sleeping car configuration. Sleeping cars Kiewa and Latrobe were withdrawn in 1929, and combined sleeping/dining car Avon followed in 1932.

The three replacement sleeping cars used a similar internal arrangement to the last two E type sleepers, Buchan and Wando, but were slightly wider with steel panels used in lieu of timber slats for the sides, and a curved roof matching the other Long W carriages. Ten compartments were fitted, each capable of seating four second-class sitting passengers, or two sleeping passengers along one wall, for a day capacity of 40 passengers or 20 at night. While the cars were generally similar to the earlier joint-stock sleeping cars, they were exclusively built for use on the Victorian Railways system. All three Long W sleeping carriages were out-shopped fitted with air conditioning on 5 July 1937, (Note: Both Drymalik and Vincent record Ovens as being fitted with air conditioning and/or renumbered as Sleeper No.3 on 13 May 1938, but this is incompatible with the Newsrail mention that air conditioned sleeping carriages were allocated to both the Mildura and Overland services by September 1937.) at which point the names were removed and the carriage identities swapped to Sleeper No.1, No.2 and No.3 in build order. On Friday, 9 July 1937 the first fully-air conditioned train in Australia left Spencer Street for Mildura, and by April 1938 the standard Mildura overnight consist was one each airconditioned AE, BE and sleeping car, with additional non-airconditioned stock used if required. One air-conditioned sleeping carriage was allocated to The Overland by September 1937, and in July 1938 the three existing cars were joined by Sleeper No.4, formerly Buchan, to allow a spare vehicle for maintenance purposes. The Overland lost its air conditioned carriage with the coal strikes in 1940. The air conditioning upgrades included upgraded bogie designs, to carry the weight of the axle-mounted generators.

The cars were initially painted in standard VR dark red, but were repainted to blue with yellow stripes sometime between 1954 and 1963. As with their predecessors, the Long W sleepers were themselves replaced by cascaded Joint Stock sleeping cars, this time with four steel cars, Allambi, Tantini, Dorai and Weroni, being taken from the Overland fleet in the early 1970s. From this point on the air-conditioned Long W sleepers were kept in reserve. The steel cars were repainted dark blue and renumbered No.11 through No.14 (later SJ281-284). Additional air-conditioned sleeping cars No.15 and No.16 were transferred from the standard gauge Spirit of Progress service in 1978 (becoming SS285-286 about a decade later), occasionally joined by VAM1 (later SZ2877) when that car was not required on standard gauge Sydney and Canberra or broad gauge Overland services.

The Long W, SS and SZ cars were all withdrawn in 1989 (the two SS cars reverting to sitting format), with Nos 1 and 2 stored at Newport and No.3 at Seymour. No.1 was delivered to Steamrail Victoria on 30 August 1990, followed by No.2 on 19 April 1991, while No.3 was allocated to SLSPG, now the Seymour Rail Heritage Centre.

=== Current status ===
Steamrail Victoria maintains Werribee and Indi in the West Block of Newport Workshops.

Ovens is with the Seymour Rail Heritage Centre, stabled under cover at their depot in Seymour, Victoria.

== Dining cars ==
Avoca & Hopkins
- In service: 1927–1984
- Capacity: 48 diners

Specifications
- Weight: 59 LT 8 cwt 0 qtr (60.35 t); Avoca later 69 LT 10 cwt 0 qtr (70.62 t) and with concrete sub-floor, 75 LT 0 cwt 0 qtr (76.20 t)

Two new dining cars were built in 1927, named respectively Avoca and Hopkins. These were the first all-steel passenger carriages built for the Victorian Railways. They had a similar underframe to the standard E type carriage, but the body design was vastly different, using steel plates rivetted to the frame and a curved roof style, the latter paralleling the Long W type carriages, and the overall aesthetic above the floor-line resembling bulk steel van 1D built at Islington in 1930 (although that had a different underframe design). The new dining cars were so heavy, at well over 70 tons, that they had to be placed on modified Tait Motor-car bogies, as the only type that could support the load. Aside from the three Pullman cars, these were the heaviest items (by axle load) of rollingstock to run in Victoria at the time. Shortly thereafter they were roughly matched by the X Class 2-8-2 steam locomotives, and eclipsed in 1941 by Heavy Harry, with its 23-ton maximum axle load.

Couplings were an oddity; the two were fitted with standard screw couplings when new, but by late 1935 they were both converted to autocouplers. A few months later they went to transition couplings, then back to proper autocouplers in 1936. Inside, the cars were partitioned at about the half-way mark, with 48 seats arranged in a 2+2 with 12 tables saloon configuration. Beyond this was a counter/buffet area facing the dining area; a corridor then ran along one side of the kitchen area, with the rest of the car devoted to a kitchen and food preparation area. This was a distinct change from the layout of the E type dining cars, which had a central kitchen area with the first class dining facilities at one end, and second class at the other.

The cars quickly became known as Iron Tanks by most rail workers, or nicknamed "Hell" by crew members who had to work in the kitchen section with its huge wooden fuel stove, which was not airconditioned. Crew members could regularly be seen gasping for fresh air at open windows.

Bau notes that the 1927 Victorian Railways Annual Report outlines the dining cars' initial use, with Avoca being first used on the Royal train for the Duke & Duchess of York and then commenced running on Albury line trains and that the second car, Hopkins, was put into service on the Adelaide Express between Melbourne and Ararat. Later, both cars were used on The Overland interchangeably, replacing E type dining cars Goulburn, Campaspe and Wimmera which were then converted for other uses.

Avoca was air-conditioned in February 1936, as the second carriage on the VR network to have this modification following 36AE. This was so it could be the standby dining car for the then-new Spirit of Progress. It was painted into blue/gold in December 1953 for the royal train. The old briquette stove was replaced in April 1969 with a Porta-gas model.

Roller bearings were added in the late 1960s. The bogies were completely replaced in 1973 with a then-modern fabricated design, reclaimed from Spirit of Progress carriages and modified to support the tremendous weight of Avoca which tended to sway about on rough track. In May 1984, as part of the New Deal rollingstock renumbering, Avoca was given a new identity of RS235, the first time it had been considered as part of the S fleet. Around this time the car was repainted into a "heritage" livery, reminiscent of the dark maroon with yellow lining applied to the first E cars when they were built. Today, Avoca is owned by Victrack and under the care of the Seymour Rail Heritage Centre.

Hopkins had a similar history and use case to Avoca except that it was not airconditioned by the Victorian Railways. In 1950 it was deemed surplus and sold to the Commonwealth Railways, who reclassed it as DB75, provided air conditioning and converted it to standard gauge so that it could enter service in November that year. On 19 February 1952 it had been repainted into the Commonwealth Railways colour scheme, and by December 1954 new bogies of the BK type were fitted. It was used mainly on the Trans-Australian Express, and later on The Ghan. It was written off on 29 March 1968.

== Bulk mail van 1D ==
Bulk Mail Van 1D
- Manufacturer: South Australian Railways
- Built at: Islington Railway Workshops
- Constructed: 1931
- Entered service: 1931–1980s
- Number built: 1
- Capacity: 25 long tons (25.40 t)
- Operators: Victorian Railways, South Australian Railways

Specifications
- Car body construction: 60 ft 1.5 in (18.33 m)
- Width: 10 ft (3.05 m)
- Height: 13 ft 2 in (4.01 m)
- Weight: 37.5 long tons (38.10 t)
- Bogies: Four-wheel, cast-steel equalised at 40 ft (12.19 m) centres

Van 1D is not strictly speaking part of the Long W fleet, but it has aesthetic similarities to the two dining cars Avoca and Hopkins mentioned above and was built around the same time. Like those two, it was built as an all-mild-steel vehicle (but with a centre-truss type underframe), and replaced E type carriages; for the dining cars this allowed them to be reallocated to other purposes, but for 1D it was to replace van 2D destroyed at Callington, in South Australia, at the end of 1929.

This new van was built at Islington Workshops and entered service on 28 June 1931, but was not formally entered into the Victorian Railways' register until 13 May 1933. It had a large open floorplan internally, with internal bulkheads dividing the area into three linked compartments which each had a pair of external sliding doors on either side. The ends of the car were designed with vertical posts resembling the attachment points for inter-carriage diaphragms, but these were never fitted. The whole structure was of mild steel, rivetted together, and with an induroleum cement floor provided. Capacity (in the metric era) was 25.5 t (25.1 LT) or 110.4 m^{3} (3,900 ft^{3}).

In 1935 it was painted Hawthorn Green to match the repainted Overland carriages being pulled by South Australian Railways' new "Big Power" locomotives, then in dark blue with gold lining to permit use on the Spirit of Progress between Melbourne and Albury pending delivery of the dedicated mail van for that train. In 1942-43 it was painted black, then from 1946 it returned to red before passing from Australian National to Steamranger.

McLean reported in 1983 that the van had been renumbered D101, but that is not reflected in any other sources so may have been a proposal or an internal administrative reference only.

=== Current status ===
Van 1D is preserved at Steamranger in Victor Harbor, South Australia.

== In service ==
=== First delivery phase, 1926 ===
60AW-63AW, 65AW, 60ABW-63ABW, 65ABW, 60BW-63BW & 65BW

=== Second delivery phase, 1927 ===
64AW, 66AW-68AW, 64BW & 66BW-70BW

=== Standard Gauge service – VFW ===
VFW 7 is at Junee Roundhouse Museum

=== New Deal, the abolition of wooden rollingstock and preservation ===
The W type carriages were slowly phased out of service from 1981 as part of the 'New Deal' reforms of passenger rail operations, with a number going into preservation. They are now shared by Steamrail Victoria and other rail preservation groups. Being a mainstay on the Victorian Railways network for so long, the W-series has a large number of representatives still in service today. However, when the time for preservation rolled around the longer, wider cars were preferred due to their higher seating capacity and as a result, most of these are higher-numbered.

At Healesville's Yarra Valley Railway, car 63AW (as 34MT) is stored pending restoration. 62BW were recently reduced to underframe only, as the timber in the carriages had rotted beyond repair.

The Mornington Railway has 65AW in service and has 63ABW stored pending overhaul from the former South Gippsland Tourist Railway.

As of 2013, Steamrail's business plan recorded 64AW, 63ABW, 60BW, 61BW, 63BW, 67BW and 68BW as serviceable; carriages 65BW (underframe only), 66BW, 70BW, 71BW (ex 60AW) and 80BW (ex 61ABW) were marked as stored; 80BW has since been transferred to Maldon. Until late 2008, 62AW was also stored on-hand, see below.

The Victorian Goldfields Railway borrowed 80BW (ex 61ABW) from Steamrail, from 23 June 2012. This car was swapped for 67BW, which returned to the Steamrail depot on the same day.

68AW is privately owned and currently numbered 79BW.

Around 2008–2012 a number of stored carriages had to be moved around Newport to make way for new suburban stabling. When this was attempted it was found that a number of carriages had been left in the open for too long, and were beyond repair. As a result, 62AW (as 32MT), 64BW and 69BW, which had been in storage at the "Tarp Shop" yard, was scrapped sometime between 28-Sept-2008 and 01-Oct-2008. At the same time other yards were being sorted through, and it was found that Healesville's 62BW was beyond repair. Both of these have been reduced to underframes.
