= Victorian Railways Short W type carriage =

Wooden carriages of the Victorian Railways

The W type carriages were wooden passenger carriages used on the railways of Victoria, Australia. There were two variants, short- and long-body vehicles, and this article deals with the former. Details on the latter can be found here.

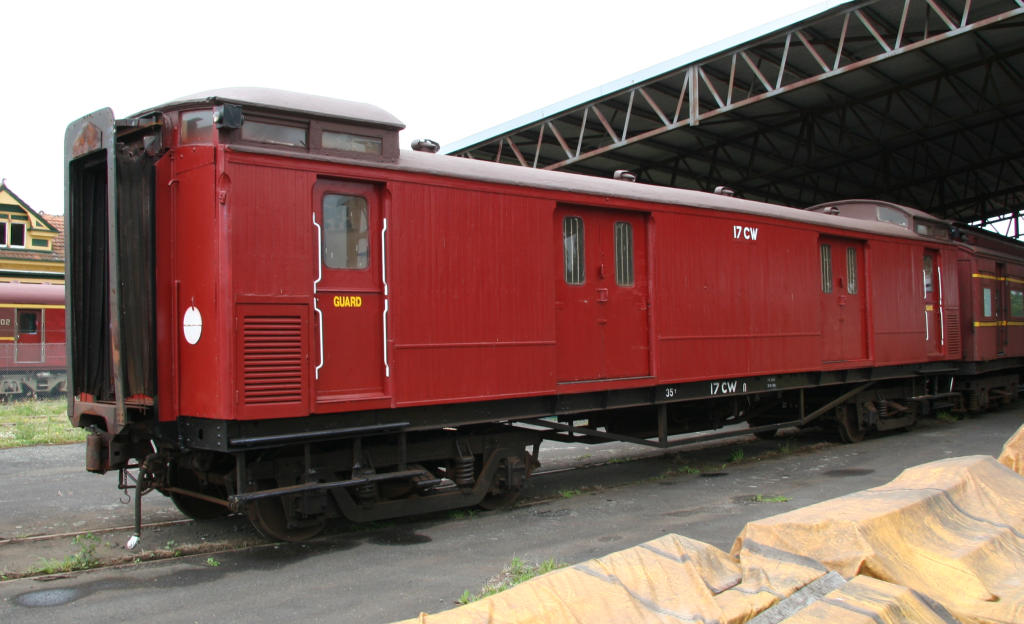
Elliptical-roofed 17CW as preserved at the former South Gippsland Railway

== History ==
Short sitting cars
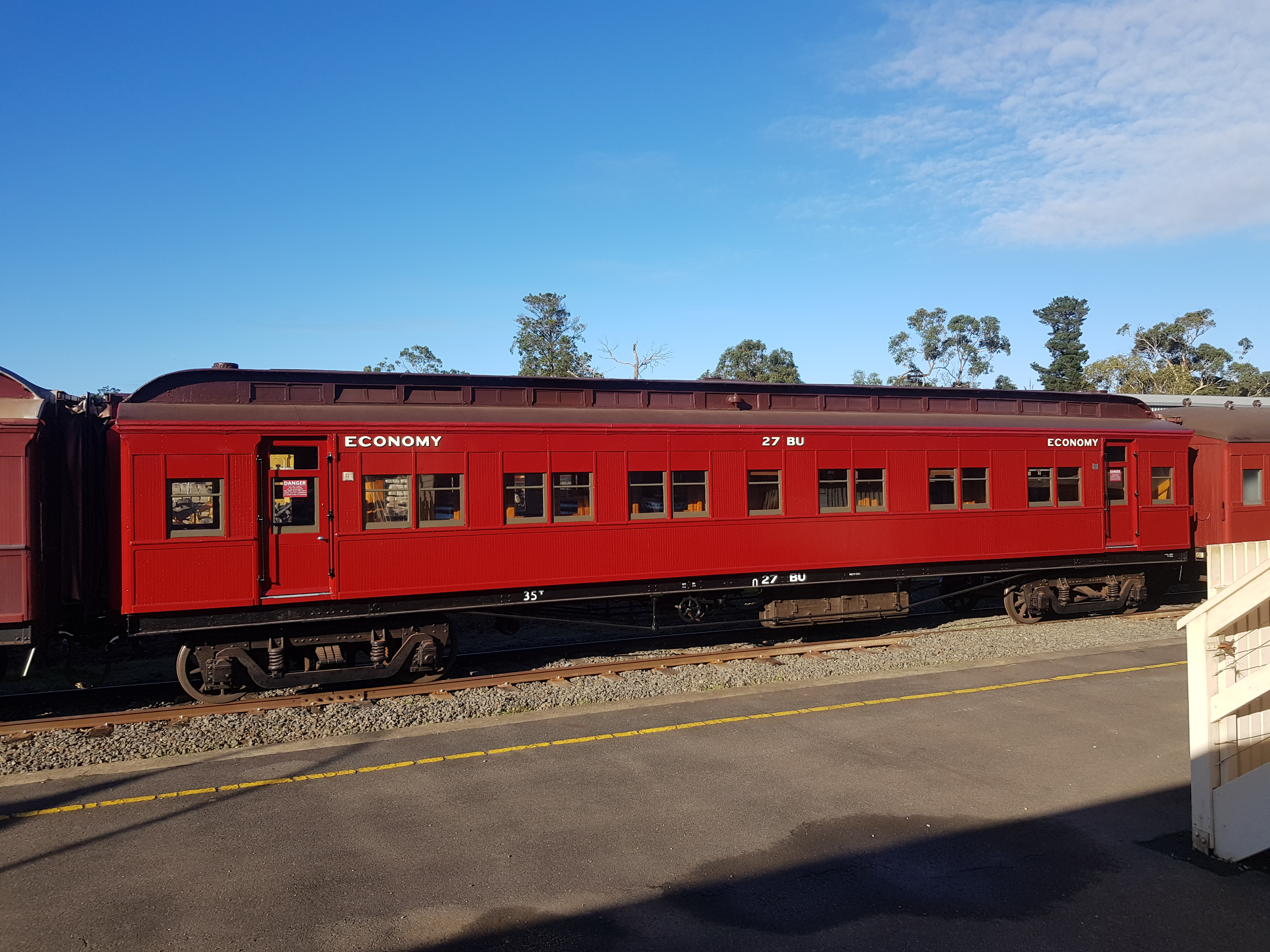
- Clerestory-roofed 27BU preserved at the Mornington Railway
- Manufacturer: Victorian Railways
- Built at: Newport Workshops
- Constructed: 1911–1914; 1918–1919, 1922 & 1925
- Entered service: 1911–1984
- Number built: 40x AW, 52x ABW, 44x BW
- Number preserved: 23, 24, 25, 35 & 39AW 25, 32 & 40ABW/ABU; 27, 41 & 42BU 1, 2, 32 & 35BW
- Number scrapped: 124
- Fleet numbers: 1-40AW, 1-52ABW (later 2-52ABU), 1-44BW, later 1VBW
- Capacity: 40 1st class passengers (AW) 20 1st class & 26 2nd class passengers (ABW/ABU); 48 2nd class passengers (BU) 60 2nd class passengers (BW)
- Operator: various heritage operators

Specifications
- Car body construction: Timber
- Car length: 58 ft 1 1/2 in (17.72 m) over body; 61 ft 2 3/4 in (18.66 m) over pulling lines
- Width: 9 ft 6 in (2.90 m)
- Height: 13 ft 7 in (4.14 m) (clerestory-roofed cars); 13 ft 0 7/8 in (3.98 m) (curved roof cars)
- Maximum speed: 70 mph (113 km/h)
- Weight: 27 LT 12 cwt 0 qtr (28.04 t) (AW) 28 LT 6 cwt 0 qtr (28.75 t) (ABW/ABU); 28 LT 6 cwt 0 qtr (28.75 t) (BU) 27 LT 15 cwt 0 qtr (28.20 t) (BW)
- Axle load: 6 LT 18 cwt 0 qtr (7.01 t) (AW) 7 LT 1 cwt 2 qtr (7.19 t) (ABW/ABU); 7 LT 1 cwt 2 qtr (7.19 t) (BU) 6 LT 18 cwt 3 qtr (7.05 t) (BW)
- Bogies: W type at 43 ft 4 in (13.21 m) centres
- Braking system: Westinghouse air brakes
- Coupling system: Autocoupler
- Track gauge: 5 ft 3 in (1,600 mm); one on 4 ft 8 1/2 in (1,435 mm) standard gauge

In the early 20th century, the Victorian Railways decided to convert the metropolitan part of the network to electric traction. As part of that project, a large number of "Swing Door" ("dog box") cars were converted to electric traction, which left a gaping hole in the carriage fleet. As a result, the 'W' series of passenger cars was built. Four variations were constructed from 1911 onwards: AW, ABW, BW and CW.

The origin of the 'W' designation is unclear. In most other cases the class letter was derived from a basic feature of the car type, or its use. In the 1900s, new express passenger cars, designated 'E', were being built to replace ageing equipment. The W-class cars were of a similar design but modified for general stopping trains. Peter J. Vincent believes the 'W' may represent 'Wayside' or non-express passenger type.

== Design and construction ==
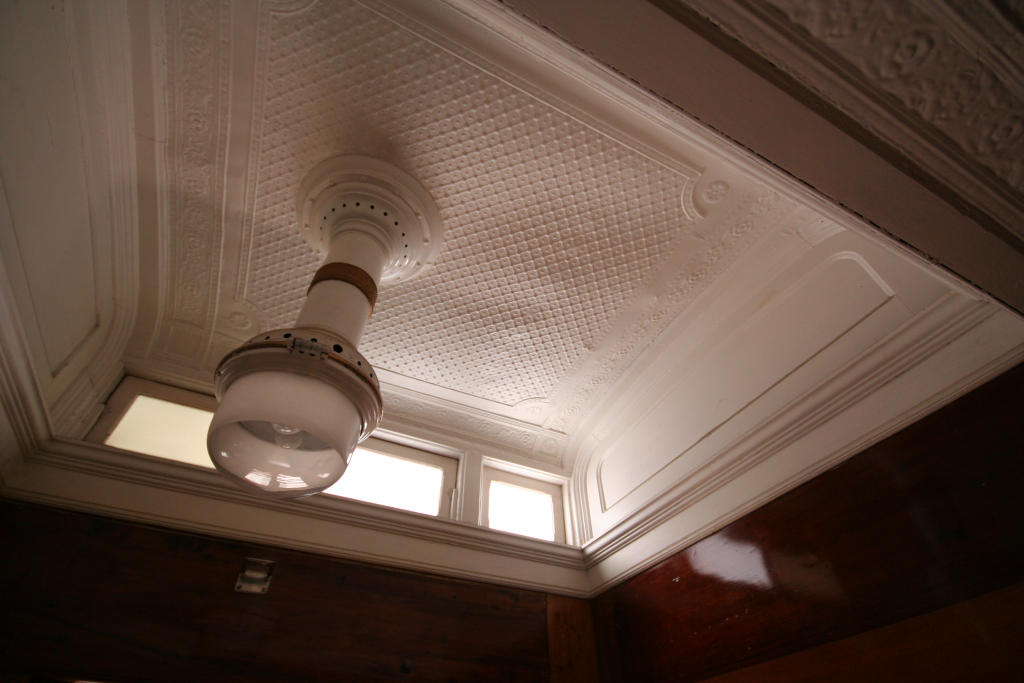
Roof detail inside a compartment

All the original passenger carriages (built 1911–1922) were about 58 feet (17.68 m) long, 9 feet 6 inches (2.90 m) wide and fitted with clerestory roofs. The fifteen 1925 cars were the same dimensions but with curved roofs.

The single-class passenger vehicles had one compartment reserved for ladies and two compartments reserved for smoking. They were also fitted with single-gender lavatories at each end, and vestibules (with lock-able doors) for walking through to other cars in a given train. There was a water fountain located about halfway down the corridor in each car.

The guards vans were built at 50 feet (15.24 m) long over body, 9 feet 6 inches (2.90 m) wide. The first fifteen were built with the standard clerestory roof and entered service between 1913 and 1914. Vans 16-20 were constructed in 1935 and shared the dimensions of the predecessors (rather than taking the wider body of the new-built passenger cars of the time), but had curved roofs fitted.

== Details ==
=== AW cars ===
Built from 1911, 29 AW cars were built. They were numbered 1AW to 29AW, and had the then-standard clerestory roofs. Over the years these were found to be insufficient for the traffic, and so numbers 30AW–35AW were built in 1922, the last to have the clerestory roof style. They seated six people in each of the 6 compartments (one reserved for ladies and two reserved for Smoking), plus two more people at each end for a total of 40 passengers. As patronage grew and older cars were retired, construction resumed in 1925. This batch consisted of 36AW to 40AW, but these cars were fitted with the new style of curved roofs.

Of the first 23 cars, when looking from the Ladies end towards the Smoking end, the corridor was on the right-hand side for cars with even numbers, but on the left-hand side for cars with odd numbers. It is not known whether this pattern extended across the rest of the shorter carriage fleet.

On 18 September 1975, 30AW re-entered service following a stint at Newport Workshops, having been selected for a trial of in-carriage heating. It used two gas cylinders supplied by Gilbarco and fitted to the undercarriage to heat water running through radiators under each seat, in lieu of foot-warmers. This was done because a new timetable, then recently introduced, did not permit enough time to equip each carriage with foot-warmers at regular intervals. The carriage was trialled primarily on Geelong and Bacchus Marsh commuter trips. Later, cars 31AW, 30-34BW and 15, 30-33CE were similarly upgraded.

==== Standard gauge service ====
In 1972 the Victorian Railways converted ten of their AW carriages to provide extra capacity for special trains on the standard gauge between Melbourne and Sydney. The first converted was curved-roof, short 36AW, which exited Ballarat North Workshops on 3 November 1972 for transfer to Newport and further modifications. While at Ballarat it was recoded 1VBW, repainted blue and gold, fitted with roller-bearing axle boxes, and had a second water tank fitted. It was joined by long AW cars 60-68, reclassed 1-9VFW. The entire consist was painted in blue and gold, and used primarily on special excursion trips such as scouting or defence 'specials' that required one train. The consist provided for up to 652 seats across the ten carriages.

=== ABW cars ===
52 58 ft-body ABW cars were built between 1911 and 1925. The earlier Clerestory-roof stock was initially numbered 1ABW to 42ABW and released to service between 1911 and 1914. In 1918–19, cars 43-47ABW were added to the fleet. Then, in early 1925 cars 48ABW to 52ABW were constructed, with the new design of a curved roof, but still retaining all other dimensions of the earlier group.

The carriages were able to seat 44 passengers across six compartments; 19 in First Class and 25 in Second. This breakup was achieved by the two seats at either end, two full and one partial-compartment provided for each class. The two outer-end compartments were classed as Smoking, while the centre two part-compartments (seven seats each) were for Ladies. The fourth seat against the centre-side wall was removed to make way for a door to the ladies' lavatory, while the gentlemen's lavatories were held at either end of the carriage, opposite to the two spare seats and adjacent to the interconnecting diaphragm. The Smoking sections of each car were segregated from the middle by way of a hinged door, and each class section had its own drinking fountain inset into the corridor wall.

Odd-numbered cars from 1 to 42 had the corridor on the left when looking from the first-class end, while the even-numbered cars in this range were built reversed. It is unknown what style was adopted for cars 43–52; however photographs indicate that 44ABW matched the even-number style while 50, 51 and 52ABW matched the odd-number style. Taking into account batch build dates, it is likely that 43 to 47ABW matched the odd/even alterations, while 48–52, the curved-roof batch, were built to the even-number style. Externally, this could be determined by the length of timber panels between windows; the first-class seats were 0 feet 6 inches (0.15 m) deeper, thus the first class compartments were 6 feet 10 inches (2.08 m) each versus 5 feet 10 inches (1.78 m) for the second class compartments; and this is reflected in the window spacing, on both the compartment and corridor side.

From 1961 to 1970, the original, clerestory ABW cars were recoded to ABU to separate them from the larger capacity 64-foot cars. 1ABW was scrapped in 1951 and thus was not converted. Many of the cars that still remained in the 1970s were converted to BU classification, thus becoming second class only. 32ABU and 40ABU often ran with the Vintage Train consist as they retained screw couplings on one end each; and they were occasionally sighted in service as part of a normal train, always coupled together with other stock on either side. Alongside the recoding, the two central toilets accessible from the adjacent compartments were merged into a single toilet compartment accessed from the corridor.

The cars ran until the late 1980s when replaced by the then-new N sets, and many were sold privately. While 37BU was purchased by the Bright museum, 20BU was substituted with both vehicles renumbered after the former was found to have been damaged in a minor collision with a crane.

=== BW cars ===
Built from 1911 to 1918 were cars 1BW to 39BW. They were designed to match the AW cars, but were second class and seated 56 people across 7 compartments, plus two at each end. They were almost exactly the same as the AW cars in every other way.

In 1925, cars 40BW to 44BW were built, with the new style of curved roofing. They were otherwise identical to the previous batch.

As noted above, two AW cars and 31-34BW were fitted with LP gas-fired boilers to circulate heated water around the carriage from 1975.

1BW and 35BW (along with 62BW) appeared in the season one episode "The Copy" of Round the Twist, and were used for filming of scenes between Healesville and Yarra Glen.

10BW and 27BW were destroyed in a collision at Seymour in 1935, 24BW and 29BW was destroyed by fire at Ballarat Car Sheds, 1977 and BW 30 was scrapped in 1970.

=== CW cars ===
CW cars
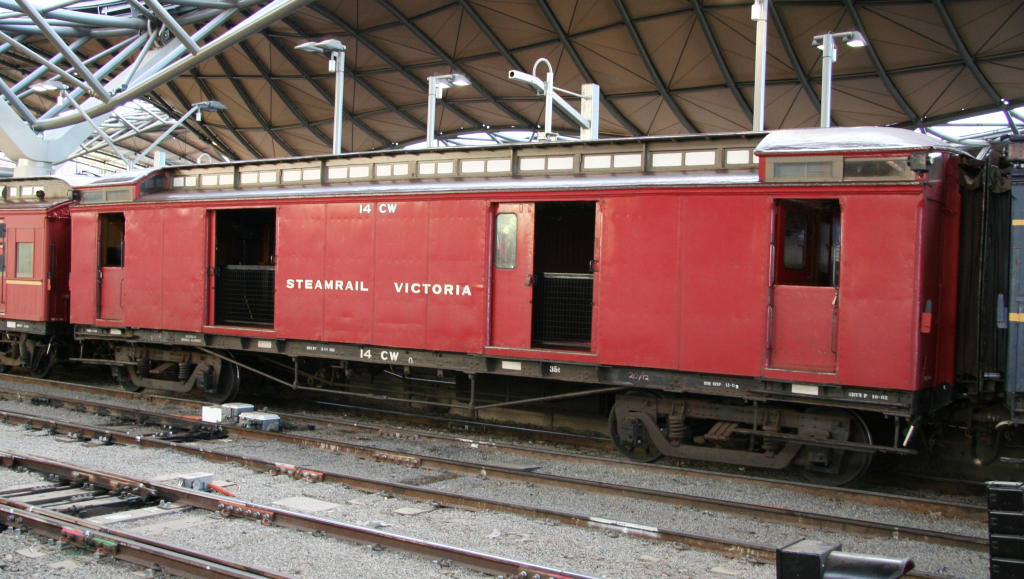
- Clerestory-roofed 14CW as preserved by Steamrail Victoria
- Manufacturer: Victorian Railways
- Built at: Newport Workshops
- Constructed: 1913–1935
- Entered service: 1913–1984
- Number built: 20
- Number preserved: 1, 2, 9, 10, 13, 14, 15 & 17
- Number scrapped: 12
- Design code: CW
- Fleet numbers: 1-20
- Capacity: 10 LT 0 cwt 0 qtr (10.16 t)
- Operator: various heritage operators

Specifications
- Car body construction: Timber
- Car length: 50 ft 2 in (15.29 m) over body; 53 ft 3 1/4 in (16.24 m) over pulling lines
- Width: 9 ft 6 in (2.90 m)
- Height: 13 ft 8 5/8 in (4.18 m)
- Maximum speed: 70 mph (113 km/h)
- Weight: 25 LT 2 cwt 0 qtr (25.50 t) unloaded (1-15) 28 LT 19 cwt 0 qtr (29.41 t) unloaded (16-20)
- Axle load: 6 LT 5 cwt 2 qtr (6.38 t) unloaded (1-15) 7 LT 4 cwt 3 qtr (7.35 t) unloaded (16-20)
- Bogies: W type at 35 ft 0 in (10.67 m) centres
- Braking system: Westinghouse air brakes
- Coupling system: Autocoupler
- Track gauge: 5 ft 3 in (1,600 mm)

To supplement the W-series passenger cars, fifteen vans were built in 1913–1914 with clerestory roof outlines and numbered CW 1–15. The vans were nearly identical to the earlier CV vans numbered 3 to 7, with a slightly wider body to take advantage of the E type design advances but the same capacity and length.

An additional five vans were built in 1935, numbered 16–20. These vans were built with the arched roof style introduced from 1925.

On 19 May 1958 vans 18CW and 19CW were sighted fitted with Tait bogies instead of the normal W car type, the difference being the additional clasp brakes. The same change was noted on 20CW on 17 November 1958.

Over time these vans had their wooden sides replaced with steel.

=== Dynamometer Car ===
Dynamometer car
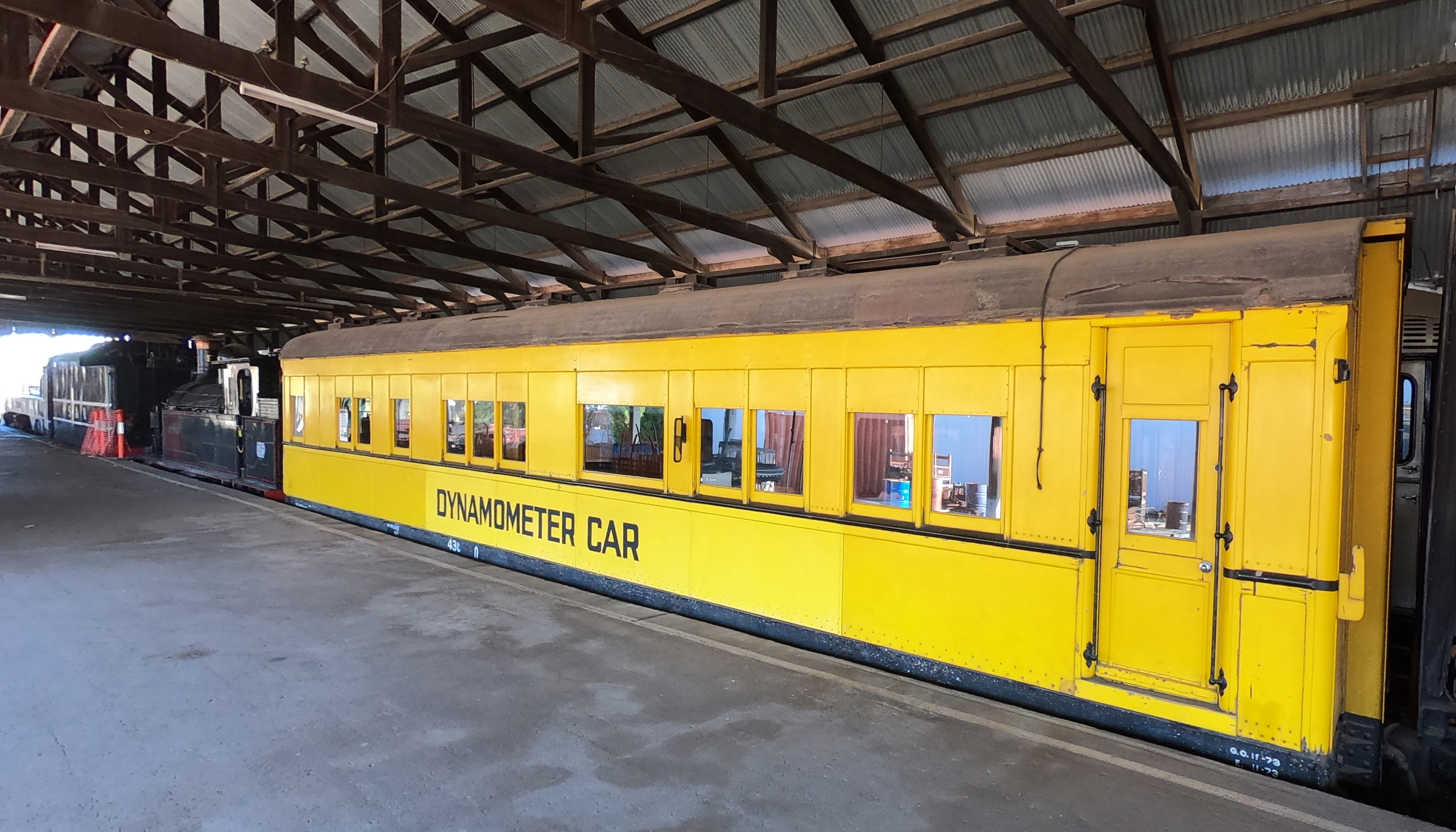
- The V&SAR joint stock dynamometer car at the National Railway Museum
- Constructed: 1932
- Number built: 1
- Number preserved: 1
- Capacity: 6
- Operator: Victorian Railways

Specifications
- Car body construction: 50 ft 0 in (15.24 m) over haadstocks
- Car length: 53 ft 9 1/4 in (16.39 m) over buffers
- Width: 9 ft 10 in (3.00 m)
- Height: 13 ft 7 3/4 in (4.16 m)
- Weight: 40 long tons (40.64 t)
- Bogies: 33 ft 7 1/8 in (10.24 m) between bogie centres, 8 ft (2.44 m) between axle centres
- Braking system: Westinghouse
- Coupling system: Autocouplers
- Track gauge: 5 ft 3 in (1,600 mm)

A crash at Callington SA in 1929 claimed three E type carriages, 5AE, 9BE and 2D. The surviving parts from those cars were recycled in the construction of the shared V&SAR Dynamometer car, for the purpose of evaluating modern, more powerful locomotive performance, combined with the need for more accurate data than could be generated with the previous Dynagraph car. Details of the vehicle are covered here instead of on the E type page because the new car reflected more modern construction techniques and styles, such as the provision of the rounded roof.

The new car entered service in 1932 for use on both the Victorian and South Australian Railways, and was initially used to generate baseline figures for tractive effort and to test rolling resistance differences between four-wheeled wagons and bogie wagons. Its first use was on 16 January 1933, testing the tractive effort generated by South Australian Railways' 500B class engine 505B from Adelaide to Tailem Bend. The thousandth test was sometime between 1937 and 1941; the two-thousandth sometime between 1951 and 1953.

Following that, the car was used to test the strength of the S Class locomotives, particularly with loaded freight trains between Wallan and Seymour, and the efficiency of pulverised brown coal (PBC) with engines X32 and later R707. It was also used in tests comparing the performance of Tait and Harris electric trains. Over the life of the vehicle, well over two thousand test runs were performed.

The end of the carriage which was intended for testing purposes was called the Leading end. From there, the car had a specially designed coupler connected to various instruments within the carriage for testing purposes. From that testing end, there was a 4 ft 4 in (1.32 m) vestibule with a wash basin, followed by an 18 ft 8 1/4 in (5.70 m) measurements room with instruments mounted on a central table, then a six-seater compartment with dining table (10 ft (3.05 m)), a 4 ft 1 1/2 in (1.26 m) wash room, and a 6 ft (1.83 m) kitchen. From there the corridor shifted to the centre of the carriage, with a 6 ft (1.83 m) bathroom on one side and a 4 ft 4 in (1.32 m) lavatory on the other. The trailing end of the carriage was fitted with a diaphragm allowing staff to walk through to adjacent carriages.

Mechanically, the primary function of the car was fulfilled by a hydraulic ram connected to the drawbar (coupler) gear at the Leading end, and the data from that system was compared to speeds derived from an axle-driven drive system and a constant speed electric motor with a mechanical integrator. Inertia was tested by a damped pendulum system, and the air brake system was tested via hydraulic cylinders connected to the brake rigging to generate data for the coefficient of friction. All data was recorded on a continuous paper roll (which could be delivered at variable speed for different data resolution); this paper would be replaced at the end of each test, having been extracted for further desktop analysis.

In late 1986 the car was involved in testing the power of heritage steam locomotive R761. On 4 October 1986, that engine, hauling the Dynamometer car, 3BKL-1BK-2BK and Goulburn, with 220 passengers (plus three staff members working the Dynamometer Car's equipment) and a total load including the engine of 393 t (387 LT), ran from Spencer Street to Bendigo and return. At Bendigo both the engine and Dynamometer car were turned, being reattached to the south end of the train for the return trip. Running back to Melbourne had been scheduled as a 100 km/h (62 mph) run, but authorisation was granted while at Bendigo to run at 115 km/h (71 mph) both to improve the data recording and account for late running. While three photo-stops had been provided on the outbound trip, none were scheduled for the return, and the train had covered the section Bendigo to North Melbourne about half an hour faster than planned, though nearly all that time was spent waiting for clear track on the approach to Spencer Street. Values recorded on the trip included the speed, locomotive cut-off, boiler pressure, drawbar horsepower, equivalent drawbar horsepower (adjusting for gradient), and the rail horsepower.

The last use of the vehicle was to test radio reception for the "train to base" system, necessary in the operation of a new "alternative safe working" method of train operation where train drivers were given operational authority by radio.

== In service ==
=== First delivery phase, 1911–1914 ===
1AW-29AW, 1ABW-42ABW, 1BW-35BW

=== Second delivery phase, 1918–1919 ===
30AW-35AW, 43ABW-47ABW, 36BW-39BW

=== Third delivery phase, 1925 ===
36AW-40AW, 48ABW-52ABW, 40BW-44BW

=== Fourth delivery phase, 1935 ===
16CW-20CW

=== Standard Gauge service – VBW/VFW ===
VBW 1 is at Dorrigo Steam Railway.

VFW 7 is at the Junee Roundhouse Railway Museum.

=== New Deal, the abolition of wooden rollingstock and preservation ===
The W type carriages were slowly phased out of service from 1981 as part of the 'New Deal' reforms of passenger rail operations, with twenty going into preservation.

The last CW vans, nos 4 and 15 were withdrawn on 18 September 1985 as they were replaced in parcels traffic by the converted D type boxvans.

At Healesville's Yarra Valley Railway, cars 1BW, 32BW, 35BW are currently either stored or being restored. 43BW's underframe is stored on site; the timber body had rotted beyond repair and required demolition in recent years.

The Mornington Railway looks after 24AW, 27BU and 17CW, all currently in service.

As of 2013, Steamrail's business plan recorded 32ABU, 40ABU and 14CW as serviceable along with 25AW and 15CW stored. The two ABU cars, formerly utilised as transition-carriages for coupling to the V type carriages because of the screw-couplings fitted, were transferred to the South Gippsland Railway. 14CW is occasionally used in heritage trains not as a guards van, but with fencing installed over the sliding doors as a sort of enthusiasts' observation carriage.

Korumburra's South Gippsland Railway had possession of the operational 17CW, and had leased 32ABU and 40ABU from Steamrail. When the railway folded in 2016, van 17CW was reallocated the Mornington Railway. On 8 December 2018, 32ABU and 40ABU were returned to Newport Workshops by truck.

The Victorian Goldfields Railway controls 23AW, 39AW, 41BU, 42BU and 25ABU, all kept at Maldon station. 23AW, 41BU and 42BU are operational, while 39AW is stored pending restoration and 25ABU is used as a volunteer accommodation carriage.

31BW was also sold, and it now functions as a restaurant in Tyabb's antique village, near Tyabb Station on the Stony Point Line. 16BW and 38BW have been sold for housing and are now situated north of Ballan. 1CW is stationary at Coal Creek along with 35 AW & 2 BW. On Peter J. Vincent's site it is noted that 9CW was sold to what is now 707 Operations, but it does not appear on their website and was last seen in the late 1990s near Trentham. 13CW now resides at Turton's Creek in South Gippsland Victoria alongside Tait carriage 220T.

9 CW and 10 CW are on private property near Trentham. Other carriages that are privately owned include 9 AW, 14 AW at the former Campbelltown Miniature Railway, 17 AW, 28 AW, 32 AW, 13 BW, 16 BW, 25 BW and 26 BW.

Around 2008–2012 a number of stored carriages had to be moved around Newport to make way for new suburban stabling. When this was attempted it was found that a number of carriages had been left in the open for too long, and were beyond repair. As a result, 4CW, which had been in storage at the "Tarp Shop" yard, was scrapped sometime between 28-Sept-2008 and 01 Oct 2008.
