= Tea and Sugar Train =

Former rail service in Australia

Tea & Sugar
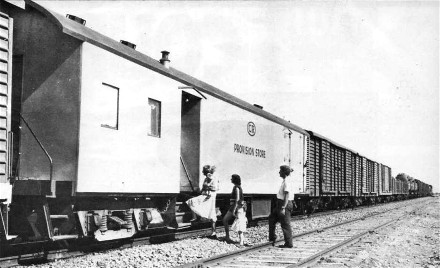
- Residents of trackside camps along the Trans-Australian Railway enter the Provision Store wagon on the Tea & Sugar train

Overview
- Status: Ceased
- First service: 1917
- Last service: 30 August 1996
- Former operator: Australian National

Route
- Termini: Port Augusta; Kalgoorlie
- Distance travelled: 1,692 kilometres
- Train number: 4205/4280
- Line used: Trans-Australian Railway

The Tea and Sugar was the nickname for one of two dedicated Commonwealth Railways trains that were the sole source of provisions for the isolated settlements of the 1691-kilometre (1051-mile) Trans-Australian Railway between Port Augusta and Kalgoorlie.

== History ==
The Tea and Sugar began in 1915 as a provision train for workers constructing the Trans-Australian Railway. They and their families depended on the train for every necessity since the rail link was the only form of transport into the region. When the railway was completed in 1917, settlements had been established along the route at which many railway operational, locomotive maintenance and track repair employees lived with their families, and there was a need to transport food, water and goods to them. This was achieved by two single-purpose weekly trains, the eastbound counterpart being known as The Bomber. Sheep were brought on the train, which had its own butcher. There was a car that allowed railway families to view the latest films (or at least, at the smaller stations, part of them) while the train was in the siding, and a welfare car staffed by a nurse.

Each time the train crossed the Nullarbor Plain, it included carriages to suit the different needs of residents throughout the year. On some trains there was a bank car, which allowed residents to make financial transactions, and a post office car; and in December there was a Christmas car, with a much-anticipated Santa who brought presents.

Former railways commissioner Dr Ron Fitch, who was the engineer for the Trans-Australian Railway early in his career, observed that the Tea and Sugar was the "most over-glamorised train in Australia ... whose real claim to fame was that its start-to-stop average speed must have made it the slowest train in the world".

The train originally operated on a 1692 kilometres (1051 miles) journey from Port Augusta to Kalgoorlie. A 1985 timetable showed the westbound service leaving Port Augusta at 12:00 on Wednesday and arriving at Kalgoorlie at 14:15 on Saturday, with the eastbound service departing at 15:00 on Wednesday arriving at 18:55 on Friday. The schedule was later cut back to an 822 km (511 mi) journey from Port Augusta to Cook.

The Tea and Sugar was withdrawn in August 1996; the last train operated from Port Augusta on 28 April 1996, and the return trip left from Parkeston on 30 April. Some carriages have been preserved at the National Railway Museum, Port Adelaide.
