= Victorian Railways X class (diesel) =

Class of diesel locomotives in Australia

- X31 on a Seymour Railway Heritage Centre Charter as Southern Cross Station
Type and origin
- Power type: Diesel-electric
- Builder: Clyde Engineering, Granville (Series 1 & 2); Rosewater (Series 3)
- Order number: 62902, 63420, 64002
- Serial number: 66-484 to 66-489; 70-700 to 70-707; 75-792 to 75-801
- Model: EMD G16C (Series 1); EMD G26C (Series 2 & 3)
- Build date: 1966, 1970, 1975–1976
- Total produced: 24
- Rebuilder: South Dynon Locomotive Depot
- Rebuild date: 2002–2004
- Number rebuilt: 6
Specifications
- Configuration
  - UIC: Co'Co'
- Gauge: 1,435 mm (4 ft 8 1/2 in), 1,600 mm (5 ft 3 in)
- Length: 18.53 m (60 ft 10 in)
- Loco weight: 114 t (112 long tons; 126 short tons) (1); 116 t (114 long tons; 128 short tons) (2&3)
- Fuel type: Diesel
- Prime mover: EMD 16-567C (Series 1); EMD 16-645E (Series 2 & 3)
- Engine type: V16
- Aspiration: Roots Blower
- Generator: EMD D32B-D14 (S. 1 & 2); EMD AR10-E1-D14 (S. 3)
- Traction motors: EMD D77
- Cylinders: 16
Performance figures
- Maximum speed: 133 km/h (83 mph)
Career
- Operators: Victorian Railways; State Transport Authority; Public Transport Corporation; Freight Australia; Pacific National; East Coast Heritage Rail; SCT Logistics
- Number in class: 24
- Numbers: X31–X54
- Delivered: 1966
- First run: 15 August 1966
- Last run: 10 June 1976
- Preserved: X31, X54
- Current owner: East Coast Heritage Rail; Watco Australia; Pacific National; SCT Logistics; Seymour Railway Heritage Centre; VicTrack
- Disposition: 4 in service, 2 preserved, 5 stored, 6 rebuilt, 7 scrapped

The X class are a class of mainline diesel locomotives built by Clyde Engineering, Granville and Rosewater for the Victorian Railways between 1966 and 1976.

== History ==
In preparation for the opening of the standard gauge line between Melbourne and Albury, the Victorian Railways had purchased a further eight S class locomotives, with the last of these entering service in 1961. But from that date traffic had increased, with a 20% increase in train miles being run by the end of the financial year by the middle of 1965, so the fleet was being stretched beyond reasonable capabilities.

Standard gauge trains at the time were typically rostered for a single S class locomotive, which could deliver approximately 1,800 hp. When one was not available, two T class locomotives (each delivering approximately 950 hp) could be and were used in lieu. This strategy could not, however, be a long-term solution as the T class had been designed for branch-line work and were restricted to 60 mph (96.6 km/h) rather than the 70 mph (112.6 km/h) top-speed of the S class, and the two T class units weighed roughly 24 tonnes (26.5 short tons) more than the single S unit - both major detriments to efficiency. On 23 July 1965, the Chief Mechanical Engineer, Mr Galletly, wrote that there was a need for an additional six 1,800 hp engines, which would allow the T class to be shifted back to their originally-intended duties. The plan at the time was to allocate two of the new engines to Standard Gauge operations, and the other four to Broad Gauge.

Tenders for contract 62902 were closed on 1 September 1965, with reviews completed nine days later. Three offers had been received; from English Electric, Goninan and Clyde Engineering. Clyde's proposal was viewed most favourably by the VR, as they offered the fastest delivery timeframe and a lower total cost of ownership by designing the new units to share many components not only with the S class but also (though to a lesser extent) the B class, both of which had also been designed and built by Clyde.

=== First Series - X31 to X36 ===
Clyde's draft design was in general terms for an extended version of a fourth-order "low-nose" T class body (deliveries of which had commenced in early 1964), but based on the mechanical platform of the S class. After the tender had been won, three revisions were made (the major changes being the placement of the battery box) before the final design was approved as general arrangement drawing 2409983C.

As had been specified in the original tender documents, and despite external appearances, the driver's cabin was configured with a single set of controls positioned facing the long end of the hood (which was referred to as the Number 1 end). Driving with the Number 2 (short) end leading would technically be possible, though strongly discouraged as the driver would be sitting on the opposite side of the cabin to that expected by the positioning of trackside signals and signage while also having his back to the brake controls and speedometer.

The first batch of six were built in 1966 by Clyde at Granville in New South Wales with the model designation G16C and using GM EMD 16-567C engines, which would produce 1,810 hp for traction. The choice of the hood-style body made inspection and maintenance access to the engine and many of the other power-train components much easier compared to "streamline" units like the B and S classes, which could be inspected from within the body but required almost-complete disassembly to remove or exchange larger parts. After assembly and initial testing, each unit ran at least one trial trip on the Main North line to Broadmeadow, near Newcastle, before being marshalled into freight trains for delivery to and hand-over at Albury. All six units entered service by the end of 1966.

In keeping with the original plan, four of the six were to be converted to broad gauge operation on a rotating basis. Locomotive X31, however, was continually affected by a manufacturing issue with its pneumatically operated Automatic Staff Exchanging equipment (which was of a new design) and so was excluded from the broad gauge rotation until the problem was finally resolved in the mid-1980s at Newport Workshops - though by this time the use of automatic-exchange equipment in Victoria was rapidly declining. It was first moved over to standard gauge on 16 August 1966, using bogies swapped from S309, and was regularly sighted on standard gauge services reported in Divisional Diary and Newsrail through to the early 1980s.

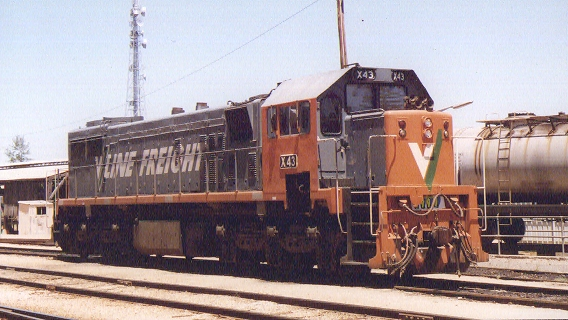
X43 in V/Line Freight livery stabled at Mildura.

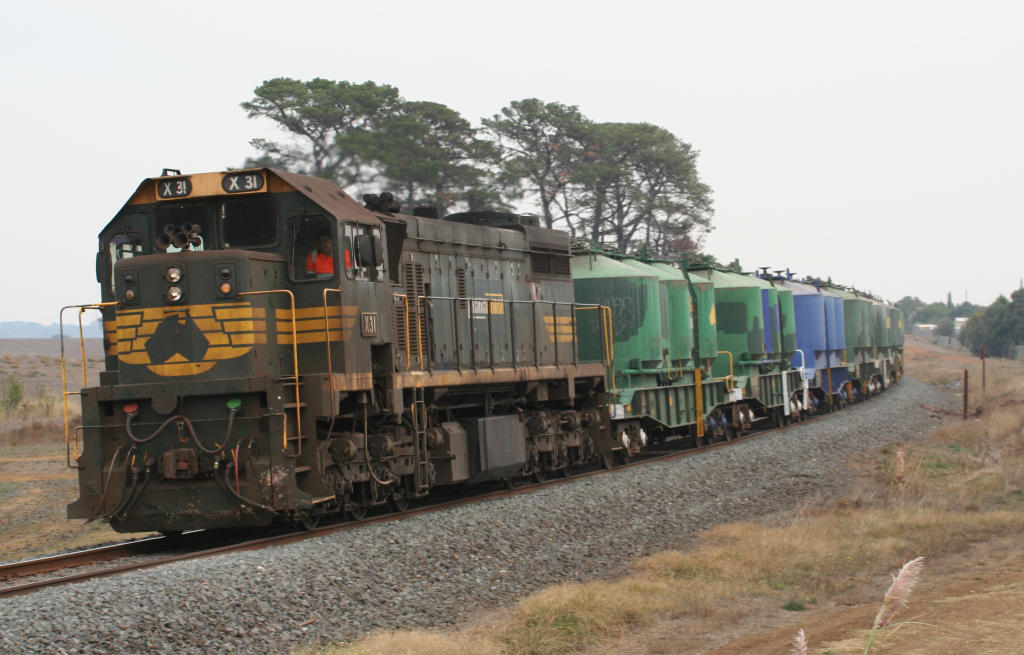
Freight Australia liveried X31 at Grovedale in April 2007.

Otherwise, they hauled passenger and freight services throughout Victoria. On the broad gauge, they operated with the ten broad gauge S Class locomotives, with typical assignments being freight service to Adelaide, and associated passenger workings like The Overland and The Vinelander. However, it was rare for them to venture out to Gippsland until the late 1970s, and the Bendigo line was near-exclusively run with B class locomotives for sake of operational simplicity.

X33 was involved in a very serious head-on collision near Broadford loop only a few months after delivery, on 5 January 1967. It returned to Sydney for rebuilding by Clyde Engineering. However, X35 suffered much further when it fell off a bridge near Glenorchy in 1971, following a high-speed crash with a loaded gravel truck. The frame was permanently warped, making it "almost impossible" to properly align the engine and generator units. Not much later it was involved in a side-swipe that gouged a side of the body.

On 14 August 2017 Seymour Railway Heritage Centre acquired class leader X31.

=== Second Series - X37 to X44 ===
Only a few years after the delivery of X36, a further traffic increase meant additional engines were needed. Clyde Engineering was the only company to submit a tender for the contract (63420) by the closing date of 30 April 1969.

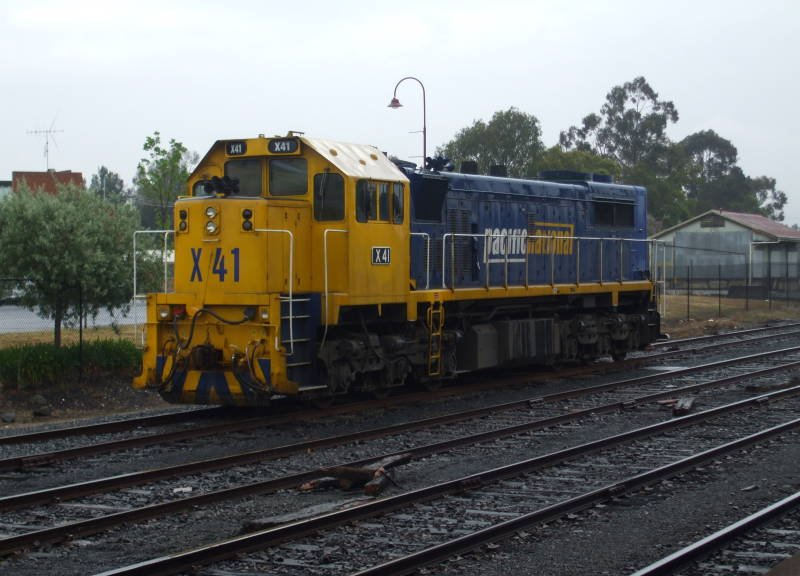
Pacific National liveried X41 at Seymour in November 2007.

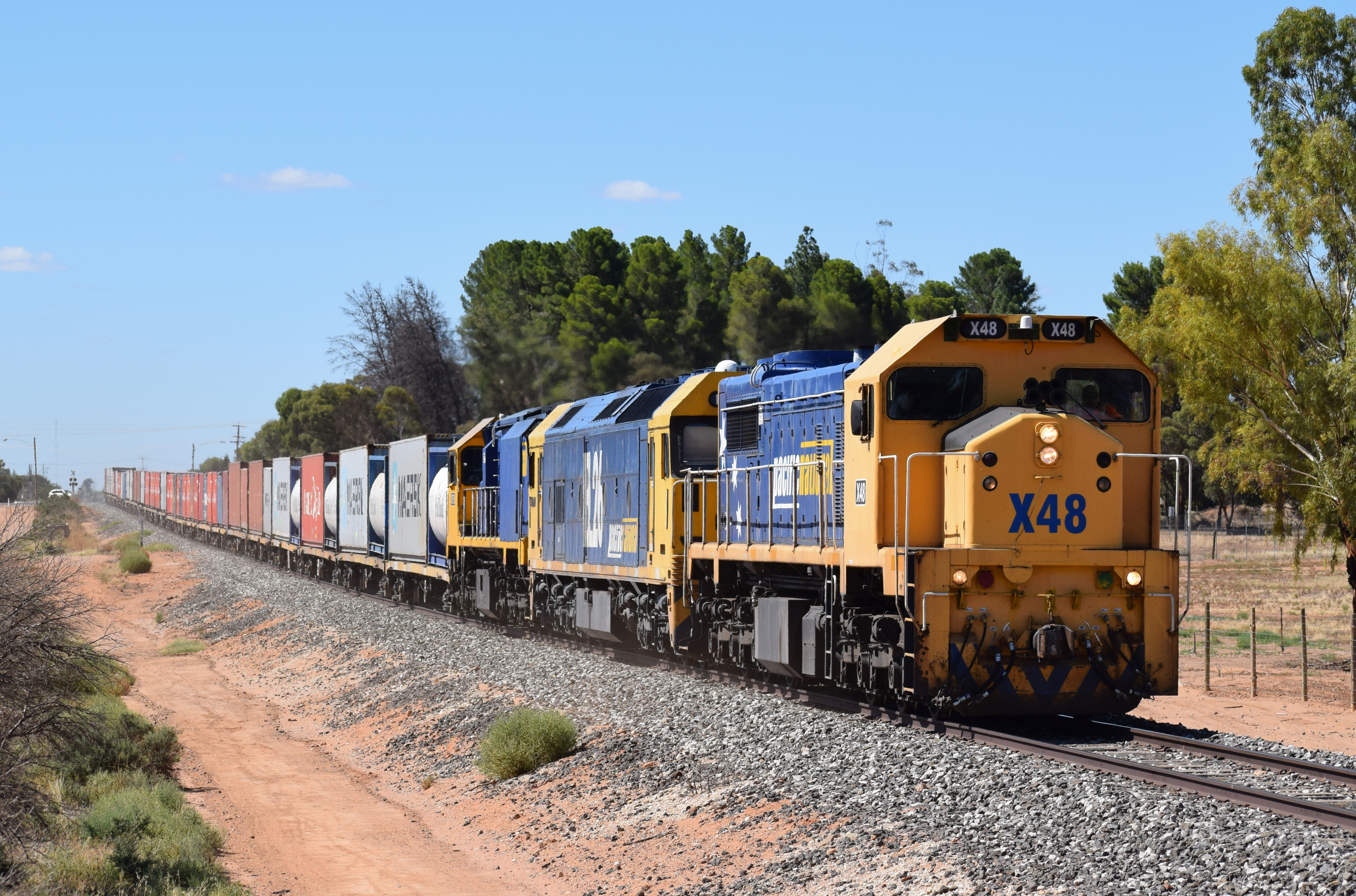
X48, BL26 and XR558 lead the Merbein freight 9702V to Melbourne at Irymple.

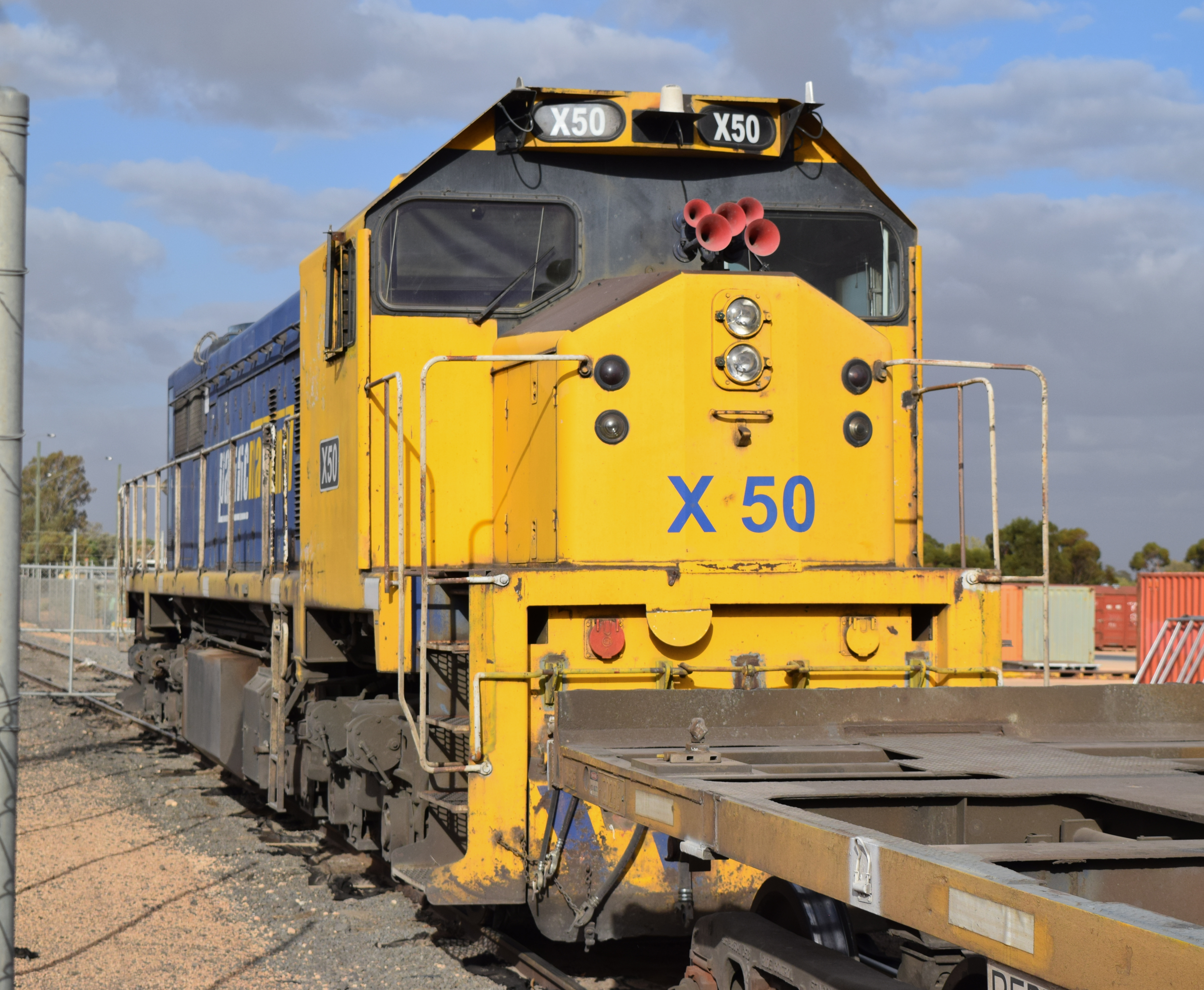
X50 shutdown in the Merbein sidings.

The tender was essentially for an upgraded version of the X Class, this time with at least 2,000 hp and, for the first time, crew comfort was taken into consideration with a maximum noise specification applied to the new design. The new engines were priced at a little under $300,000.

Shortly before the contract closed, two of the S class fleet were destroyed in the Violet Town rail accident. Victorian Railways spoke to Clyde about rebuilding those two engines from scratch, and the cost for rebuilding each would have been around $377,000 each - considerably more than the new order for X engines. So the contract for six additional engines was extended to eight instead. Paperwork shows X37 and X38 as rebuilds, but this was only for accounting purposes and no recycled components were included in those or other engines when first delivered.

The final production engine was fitted with the newly developed EMD 16-645E engine in place of the 16-567 (same shell but with larger pistons and other components), called the G26C design and rated at 2,200 hp. Externally the engines were similar to their predecessors but the larger engine spun at a higher rate (900 rpm versus the original 835 rpm), so larger radiator grilles were provided for heat dissipation. However, the radiator elements themselves were identical to the first order. The eight new engines were delivered across 1969–1970, and as before, the class was built in Clyde, tested around Sydney then delivered to Melbourne.

=== Third Series - X45 to X54 ===
A third tender closed on 20 February 1974, for an additional eight or ten locomotives, this time rated for 2,200 hp. The specifications were similar to the as-delivered X37-X44, but with upgraded braking equipment. The reasoning for the order was that, as well as traffic increases (now up to 13.5 million train miles per year), the earlier diesel-electric locomotives were coming due for major overhauls, with no spare motive power to fill the gaps in the rosters (with all steam long-since gone).

Two offers were received for contract 64002 - one from Comeng, offering the standard ALCO locomotive constructed in with the engine block imported from the US, and Clyde Engineering offered more-or-less a repeat of the previous order for X locomotives, but this time constructed at the then-under-construction Rosewater, South Australia plant. The offers were designed for an order of either eight or ten locomotives.

Aside from the standard purchase order, the tendering companies were requested to offer alternative payment plans, including the rather novel option of leasing the locomotives for 25 years from the manufacturer, rather than outright purchase. This and other options ended up being more expensive than the traditional model (with payments during construction).

ALCO's offer totalled about $3.75 million against Clyde's $3.95 million, but this offer was rejected on grounds of much higher maintenance and running costs (based on NSW and SA experiences with ALCO engines), expecting between double and triple the cost per locomotive mile, as well as the need to purchase a separate set of spares for a new ALCO fleet at around $400,000.

The final agreement with Clyde was made out at a little under $4 million for ten locomotives, plus another $50,000 for spare parts.

During the contract negotiation stage, the VR was pushed by the AFULE to develop a new locomotive cab design intended only for single-end running; attempts to fit the previous X order with bidirectional running proved to be failures on account of driver discomfort. The new cab design allowed only for short-end-leading operation on the mainline, and to improve visibility the short-end nose was cut down to an angled profile similar to the last orders of the T class locomotive. Additionally, the engines were fitted with the upgraded AR10 alternator.

The ten new engines were delivered through 1975 on the broad gauge via the Main Western line. When the first, X45, arrived in Melbourne, it was named Edgar H Brownbill.

This series of engines were normally used on the interstate runs, where multiple engines were required so back-to-back formations overcame the single-end handicaps. In addition, about half the class spent extended periods on standard gauge, and they were the first Victorian Railways class of engine allowed to run in revenue service from Albury to Sydney from December 1982.

== Modifications to the class ==
Following the 1969 Violet Town rail accident, the class were fitted with vigilance control systems. These engines could be identified by dimples on the cab roof. Around the same time the engine exhaust arrangement was modified. In the early 1980s they began working interstate to Adelaide and Sydney. Engines involved with interstate traffic were fitted with radios, and these engines had their builders plates removed and the cabside space utilised for "radio equipped" stickers.

By 20 July 1988, engines 33, 36–37, 39, 44, 46, 48-49 and 51-54 had all been fitted with cab air conditioning.

In preservation, X31 had its engine block modified to allow the fitment of 645E power assemblies by the Seymour Rail Heritage Center in late 2022 to improve parts availability, changing its engine model designation from 16-567C to 16-567E.

== V/Line era ==
The class was gradually repainted from 1983 as the V/Line logo and colour scheme was introduced. During the following decade, air-conditioning units for the driver cabins were added to some engines, above the long-end nose and next to the cab end.

Engine G521 was transferred to standard gauge in July 1987, which freed up S301 and X41 to return to broad gauge. X46 was repainted to the V/Line livery after overhaul, and first ran in that scheme on a trip to Adelaide on 6 June.

In August 1994, X35 was withdrawn following a major engine failure, and stored at South Dynon Locomotive Depot. In 1995 V/Line was split into two entities, V/Line Passenger and V/line Freight, with the freight side of the business taking the entire X fleet.

== V/Line Freight, Freight Victoria, Freight Australia era ==
V/Line Freight operated rather smoothly from 1995 to May 1999 when the entire business was sold off to a private entity, Freight Victoria. By this stage, only engines 33, 34, 36, 38, 43, 45 and 49 had been repainted from original V/Line to the (slightly modified) V/Line Freight colour scheme, so X47 became the first to wear the green and yellow Freight Victoria colours in that month. Within a year, the business had been renamed Freight Australia, and the logos on engines were modified to reflect this.

X35 was purchased by the Seymour Railway Heritage Centre in 1998 for preservation, but transferred back to Freight Australia a few years later, for rebuilding as XR551. The condition of the transfer was that when X31 was to be retired, it would pass through to Seymour for preservation.

Between 1997 and 1999, engines X47 and X49 had their short-end hoods rebuilt to allow for driver-only operation. The most noticeable difference is the wider windscreen windows.

Between 2001 and 2005, Freight Australia and later, Pacific National rebuilt six locomotives, fitting them with refurbished engines from G class locomotives, enlarged radiators, and modified cabs. These locomotives have subsequently been renumbered as the XR class.

== Pacific National era ==
In 2004, Freight Australia was sold to Pacific National. All but two of the X class fleet passed to Pacific National with the business in August 2004, these going to CRT Group. In May 2018, X53 was scrapped following a dynamic brake fire on an Aurizon Intermodal service in 2016.

X36 had been planned for conversion to XR556, but this was cancelled when it was realised that the XR program was not much cheaper than simply buying new engines (the same as the A class rebuilding program in the mid-1980s). As a result, this and the remaining 1st- and 2nd-series X fleet saw reduced use and many class members were stored at Dynon.

Mid-2008 saw a number of 3rd-series engines transferred to New South Wales for grain traffic. X36 went along as well, and was normally based at Parkes and used as a trailing unit on the Manildra Group grain shuttle trains serving Manildra Mill (often between two 48 Class). It was scrapped in May 2015.

X31 was finally withdrawn from revenue services in 2009, and per the agreement laid out earlier, in January 2010, X31 was transferred to the Seymour Railway Heritage Centre. It has been returned to service and been hired to competition companies of Pacific National, El Zorro and Qube. The X now employed hauling tour & freight services in New South Wales and Victoria.

In 2015, X47 and X51 were sold to SCT Logistics for use as shunters.

X54 was purchased by East Coast Heritage Rail in May 2021, and in 2024 was painted in the VicRail "teacup" orange and silver scheme, which none of the X class (or any other hood unit owned by VR) had been painted in during their working lives. To date, this and B72 at Steamrail Victoria are the only preserved locomotives to carry the teacup scheme.

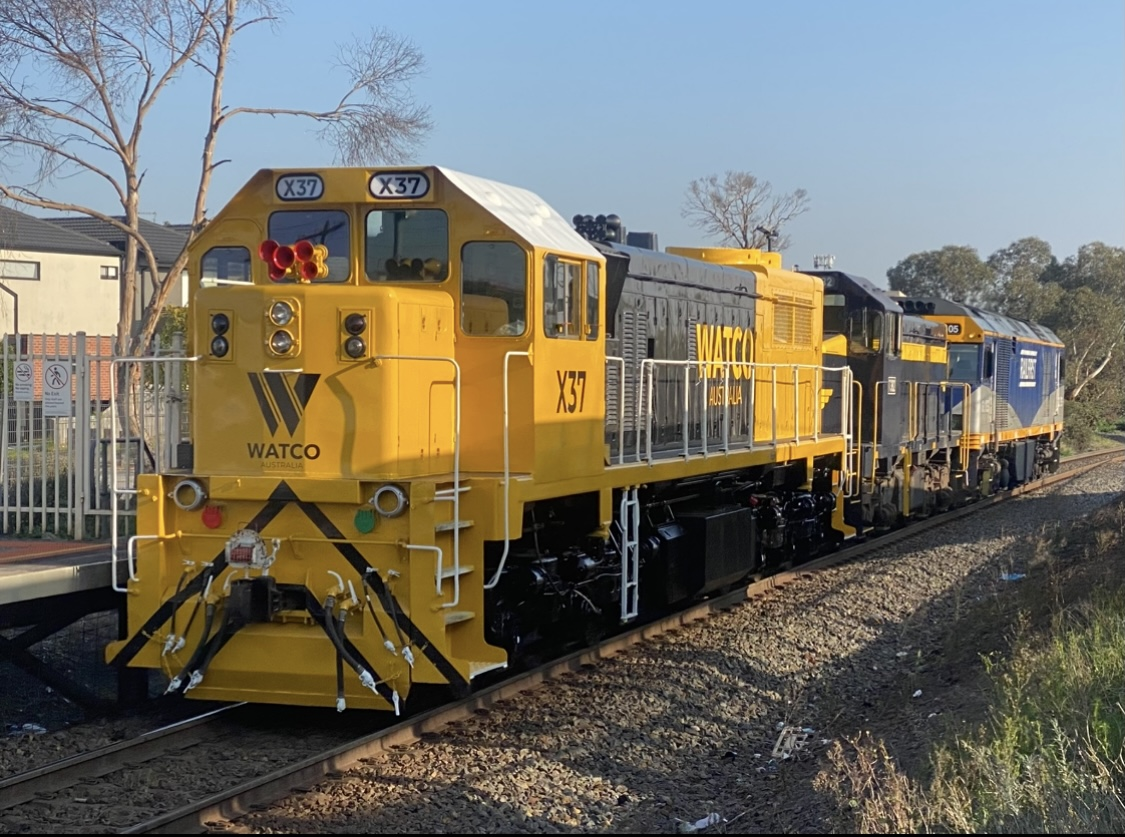
X37 after reactivation and painting into Watco livery.

X37, initially bought by SRHC for preservation, was sold to Watco Australia in mid-2025 and sent off for reactivation. This now means that there are no more preserved second-series X-class locomotives. In July 2026, it was repainted into Watco colours and in August, it was transferred to Kwinana for final fit-outs for a re-entry to service.

== Status table ==
| Key: | In Service | Stored | Preserved | Converted | Under Overhaul | Scrapped |

=== First Order ===
| Locomotive | Entered service | Name | Withdrawn | Livery | Current status | Current owner | Notes |
|---|---|---|---|---|---|---|---|
| X31 | 15 Aug 1966 | | | VR Blue & Gold | Preserved-operational | VicTrack Heritage | Allocated to SRHC |
| X32 | 8 Sep 1966 | | | FA Green & Yellow | Rebuilt as XR555 | Pacific National | Rebuilt at South Dynon by Freight Australia |
| X33 | 24 September 1966 | | | FA Green & Yellow | Rebuilt as XR553 | Pacific National | Rebuilt at South Dynon by Freight Australia |
| X34 | 5 October 1966 | | | FA Green & Yellow | Rebuilt as XR554 | Pacific National | Rebuilt at South Dynon by Freight Australia |
| X35 | 4 November 1966 | | | FA Green & Yellow | Rebuilt as XR551 | Pacific National | Purchased by the Seymour Railway Heritage Centre in 1998 for preservation, but transferred back to Freight Australia a few years later, for rebuilding as XR551. Rebuilt at South Dynon by Freight Australia |
| X36 | 15 November 1966 | | | FA Green and Yellow | Scrapped - 22 May 2015 | Pacific National | Scrapped at Werris Creek |

=== Second Order ===
| Locomotive | Entered service | Name | Withdrawn | Livery | Current status | Current owner | Notes |
|---|---|---|---|---|---|---|---|
| X37 | 9 April 1970 | | | Watco Yellow & Black | In Service | Watco Australia | Sold to Watco by ERH in mid 2025 |
| X38 | 8 May 1970 | | | FA Green & Yellow | Rebuilt as XR550 | Pacific National | Rebuilt at South Dynon by Freight Australia |
| X39 | 28 May 1970 | | | FA Green & Yellow | Scrapped - 11 May 2019 | Pacific National | Scrapped at South Dynon |
| X40 | 26 Jun 1970 | | | FA Green & Yellow | Rebuilt as XR552 | Pacific National | Rebuilt at South Dynon by Freight Australia |
| X41 | 9 July 1970 | | | PN Blue and Yellow | Scrapped - 4 May 2019 | Pacific National | Scrapped at South Dynon |
| X42 | 7 August 1970 | | | FA Green & Yellow | Scrapped - 4 May 2019 | Pacific National | Scrapped at South Dynon |
| X43 | 20 August 1970 | | | FA Green & Yellow | Scrapped - 10 June 2019 | Pacific National | Scrapped at South Dynon |
| X44 | 11 September 1970 | | | FA Green & Yellow | Scrapped - 10 June 2019 | Pacific National | Scrapped at South Dynon |

=== Third Order ===
| Locomotive | Entered service | Name | Withdrawn | Livery | Current status | Current owner | Notes |
|---|---|---|---|---|---|---|---|
| X45 | 11 November 1975 | Edgar H Brownbill | | FA Green & Yellow | Scrapped - Werris Creek | Pacific National | Scrapped, September 2026 |
| X46 | 4 December 1975 | | | FA Green & Yellow | Scrapped - Werris Creek | Pacific National | Scrapped, September 2026 |
| X47 | 24 December 1975 | | | SCT Red, White & Black | In Service | SCT Logistics | Shunting locomotive only |
| X48 | 24 January 1976 | | | PN Blue & Yellow | Stored - Dynon | Pacific National | Stored as a parts source |
| X49 | 18 February 1976 | | | FA Green & Yellow | Stored - Lithgow | Pacific National | Stored as a parts source |
| X50 | 12 March 1976 | | | PN Blue & Yellow | Stored - Dynon | Pacific National | Stored as a parts source |
| X51 | 1 April 1976 | | | SCT Red, White & Black | In Service | SCT Logistics | Shunting locomotive only |
| X52 | 22 April 1976 | | | FA Green & Yellow | Scrapped - Werris Creek | Pacific National | Scrapped, September 2026 |
| X53 | 19 May 1976 | | | QRN - Maroon, Yellow & Black | Scrapped - May 2019 | CFCL Australia | Scrapped at Islington Workshops, South Australia |
| X54 | 10 June 1976 | | | Vicrail Orange & Silver ("Teacup") | Preserved - Operational | East Coast Heritage Rail | First Locomotive to be painted in Vicrail "Teacup" in preservation |

== See also ==
- Victorian XR class (diesel)
- Victorian XRB class (diesel)
