= Freight Australia =

Former Australian railway operator

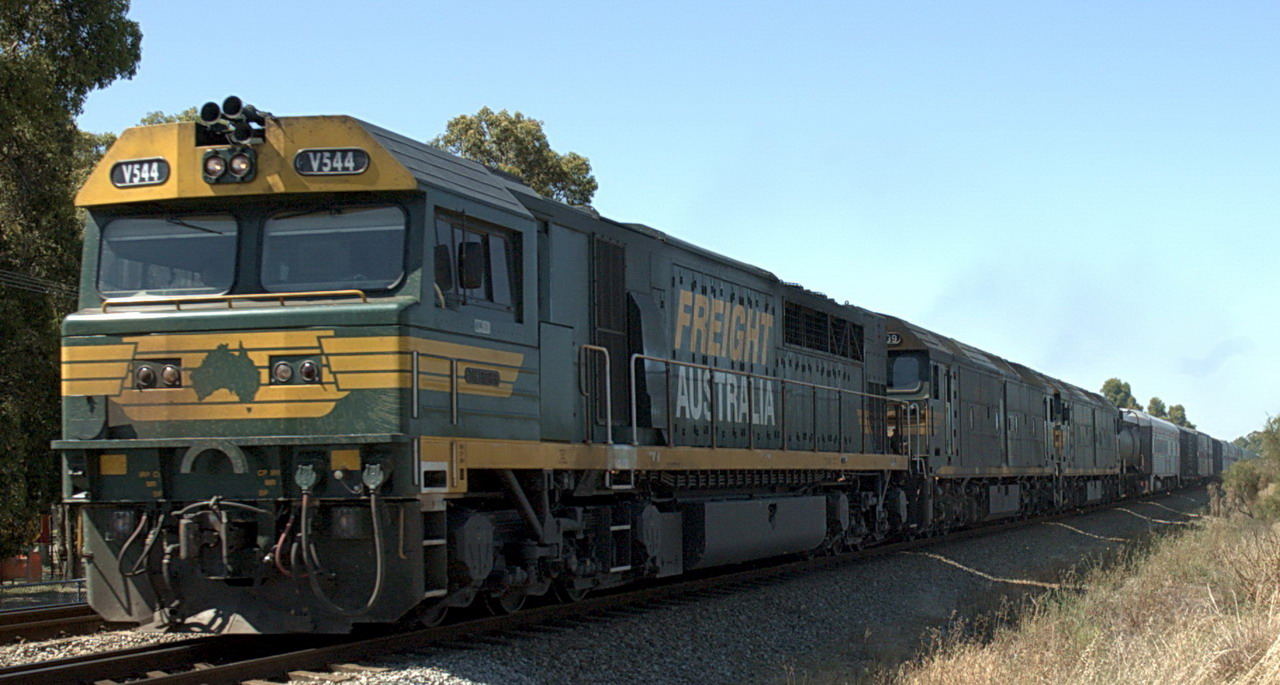
- V544/G538/G539 in the Swan Valley, Western Australia in January 2006
- Industry: Railway operator
- Founded: 1 May 1999
- Defunct: 16 August 2004
- Successor: Pacific National
- Headquarters: Melbourne
- Area served: New South Wales; Victoria
- Parent: A Goninan & Co; Fluor Daniel; Macquarie Bank; RailAmerica

Freight Australia was an Australian railway company that purchased the V/Line Freight business from the Government of Victoria in 1999. Initially known as Freight Victoria, it operated rail freight services and controlled non-urban rail track in the state of Victoria, later expanding into freight haulage in other states. Freight Australia was sold to Pacific National in August 2004.

== Background ==
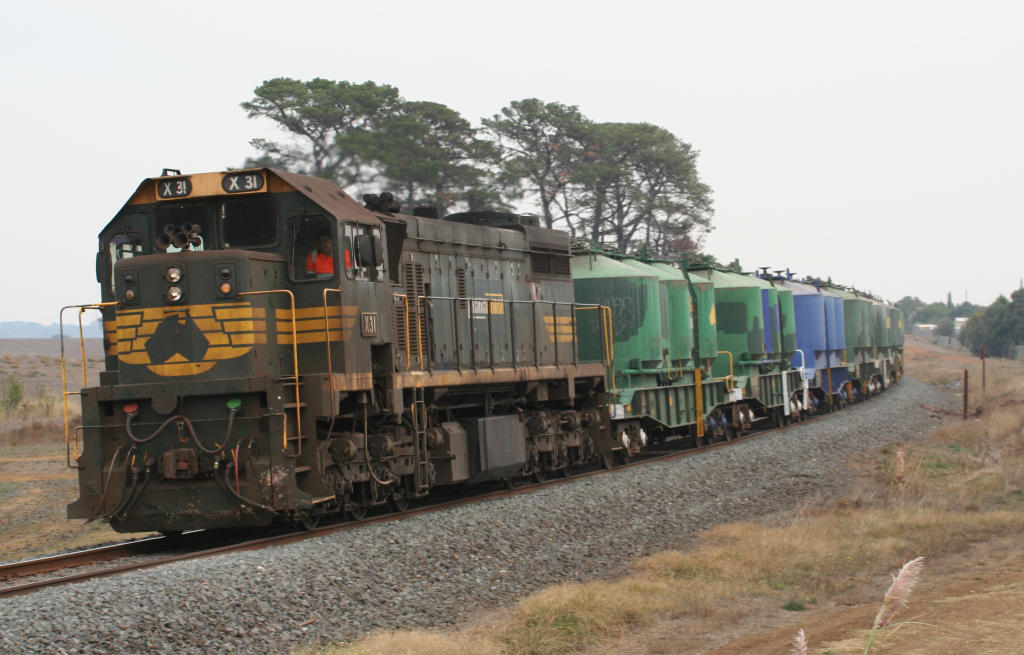
X class at Grovedale in April 2007.

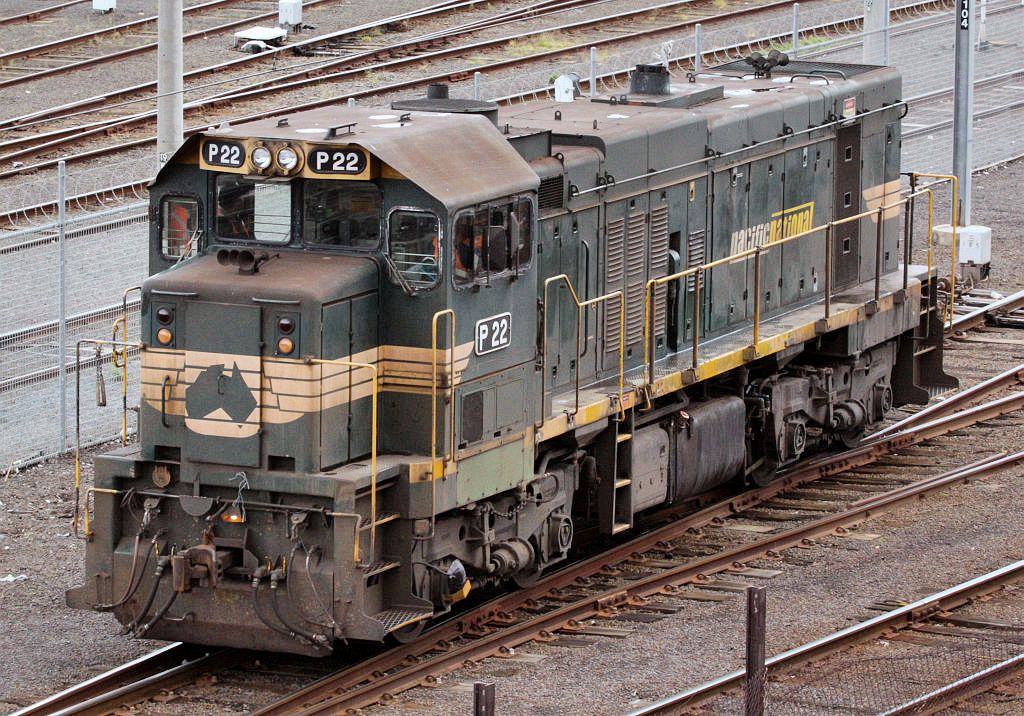
P class at North Melbourne in April 2010.

V/Line formerly had a freight division, known as V/Line Freight. Under the Kennett State Government, V/Line was split into two separate entities on 1 July 1997: V/Line Passenger and V/Line Freight, with separate management to each other in preparation for privatisation. When V/Line was privatised in 1999, the passenger and freight divisions were sold separately.

== History ==
=== Inception ===
The company was formed in March 1999 when the Freight Victoria consortium was announced by the Victorian State Government as the successful bidder for the state owned V/Line Freight business. The consortium consisted of RailAmerica, Fluor Daniel, Macquarie Bank and A Goninan & Co.

The sale included 107 locomotives and more than 2,800 freight wagons, maintenance centres at South Dynon, Geelong, Portland and Wodonga, and a 45-year lease (in renewable 15-year leases) on 4,756 km of broad gauge intrastate track in regional Victoria. A green and yellow livery was adopted for rolling stock. The company commenced operations on 1 May 1999.

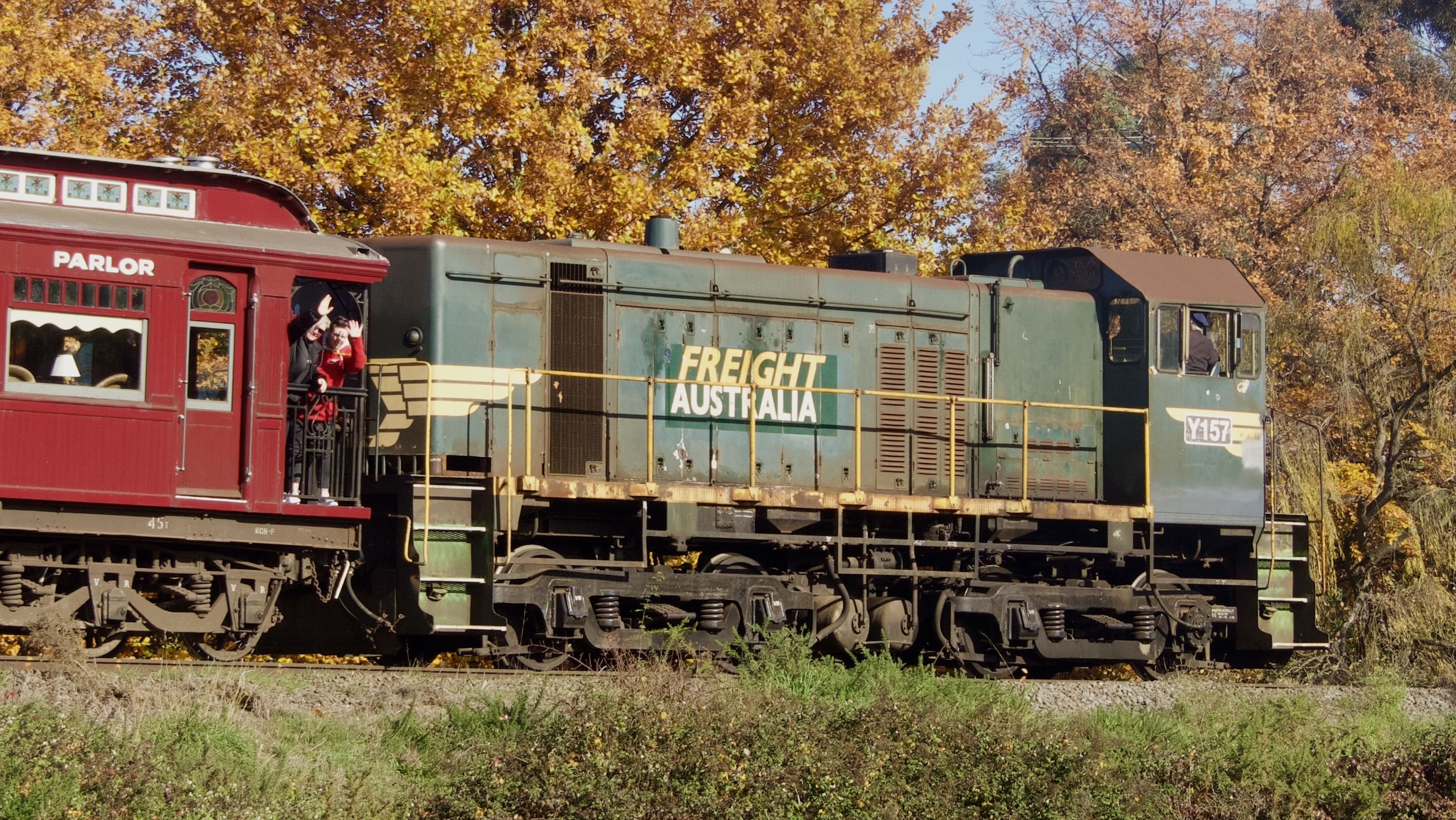
Y class locomotive on the Victorian Goldfields Railway in June 2023.

=== Expansion ===
Regular broad gauge trains in Victoria carried logs sourced from Gippsland, paper products from Maryvale, gravel from Kilmore East, as well as general freight to and from Wodonga, Tocumwal, Shepparton, Swan Hill, Bendigo, Boort, Echuca, Deniliquin, Mildura, Warrnambool and Geelong. Grain trains also operated throughout the state as required. Freight Victoria also operated standard gauge trains in Victoria to Wodonga and Dimboola.

Freight Victoria soon begun gaining contracts outside Victoria, taking advantage of open access regimes. In October 1999, it began hauling logs from Queanbeyan to Port Kembla and in December 1999 from Wallerawang.

In March 2000, the company was renamed Freight Australia. In April 2000, Freight Australia began hauling export grain from southern New South Wales to Melbourne and Port Kembla. In October 2000, it commenced hauling SCT Logistics services from Melbourne to Perth.

Further interstate contracts followed:

- Fuel: from the Clyde Refinery to West Tamworth, Dubbo, and Canberra
- Domestic grain: from throughout NSW to Weston Milling, Enfield from 2002
- Export grain: from the NSW Riverina district to Port Kembla, or Appleton Dock, Melbourne
- Friskies: grain transported to a pet food processing plant in Blayney, from the central-west of NSW
- Logs: spasmodic traffic from Canberra to Port Kembla
- Cement: Berrima to Melbourne

=== Demise ===
In October 2003, Freight Australia was put up for sale. The Australian Competition & Consumer Commission (ACCC) looked at the sale, fearing that Pacific National would create a rail and freight monopoly if it won control of the operator. At the time, other potential buyers included Australian Railroad Group, Queensland Rail, and merchant bank Babcock & Brown.

In March 2004, RailAmerica announced it had agreed terms with Pacific National to sell the business subject to government and regulatory approval. In July 2004, the ACCC announced it would not oppose the acquisition, and in August 2004, the Victorian Government approved the transfer of the Freight Australia infrastructure lease to Pacific National. Very little of the freight that FA hauled remains with PN, most of it going to road with a small amount going to other rail operators. Contracts lost to other operators include the Berrima Cement service (QUBE), the Deniliquin Rice (QUBE), the Maryvale Paper (QUBE) Allied Mills and Emerald Grain (SSR) and the Apex Quarry service (QUBE).

== Fleet ==
Included in the purchase of V/Line Freight were 107 diesel locomotives and more than 2,800 freight wagons, which had been owned and operated by the Victorian Railways and their successors. The newest and most powerful locomotives were the 3,300 hp G class delivered from 1984, but other locomotives dated as far back as the 1950s.

With traffic growing Freight Victoria decided to replace the prime movers in number of the G class, increasing the power output to 3,800 hp. The older X class diesels also saw a more extensive power upgrade program, being stripped to the frame and rebuilt as the XR class. The company only purchased a single new locomotive, V544, which was built new in 2002 to replace two written off G class locomotives. Additional rolling stock was also acquired, including new 100 tonne capacity grain hoppers built by Alstom at the Ballarat North Workshops, second-hand grain hoppers from FreightCorp, and the conversion of surplus vans into log and container flats.

To fulfill a contractual condition with customer CRT Group that if Freight Australia was acquired by a competitor of CRT Group, 10,000 hp (7,500 kW) of locomotive power (calculated by the business CRT Group was offering Freight Australia) was to be transferred to them, two G and two X class locomotives were transferred to CRT Group. The balance of the fleet was included in the sale to Pacific National.

Fleet table
Class	Image	Type	Gauge	Top speed (km/h)	Built	Number	Notes	Fate following PN takeover
A class		Diesel-electric	Broad	115	1984-1985	7	Rebuilt B class.	All withdrawn from service by May 2014. All bar one scrapped in 2019.
G class		Diesel-electric	Broad, Standard	115	1984-1989	33	2 scrapped following 1999 Ararat collision.	2 sold to QR National, later sold to Linx Cargo Care. 9 sold to SCT Logistics in March 2007, later sold again to various operators. The remaining 22 are in service with Pacific National.
H class		Diesel-electric	Broad	100	1968	5	Modified T classes for shunting at the Melbourne hump yard.	1 scrapped, 4 sold to Ettamogah Rail Hub which were later on sold to Watco Austraila.
P class	Freight_Australia_loco_P22	Diesel-electric	Broad	100	1984-1985	5	Rebuilt T class.	4 sold to Ettamogah Rail Hub. 2 of those were reactivated by SRHC and repainted into the Victorian Railways blue and gold livery. 1 preserved by 707 Operations
RTL class		Diesel-electric	Broad, Standard		1995	1	Ordered by V/line in 1995, only one ever produced, used to haul log trains between Bairnsdale and Sale from 1999 to 2000, later placed into storage at South Dynon.	Continued to be stored by PN in South Dynon until 2011 when it was sold to maintenance company Just Track.
S class	Freight_Australia_S301	Diesel-electric	Broad	115	1957-1961	5	1 leased from the Seymour Railway Heritage Centre.	1 preserved with Steamrail Victoria, 1 preserved with 707 Operations and 1 still owned by PN which is currently leased to SRHC. Remaining example was sold to SRHC in 2010.
T class		Diesel-electric	Broad, Standard	100	1955-1968	12		1 remains in service with PN as a shunting unit. 1 has been preserved with 707 Operations. Every other unit has been sold to Ettamogah Rail Hub or scrapped.
V class		Diesel-electric	Standard	115	2002	1	Built new in 2002 to replace 2 G classes that were destroyed in a collision at Ararat in 1999.	After spending long periods of time stored in Port Augusta, it was sold in May 2021 to One Rail Australia and has been returned to service.
X class		Diesel-electric	Broad, Standard	115	1966-1976	24	6 rebuilt as XR class.	1 now preserved with SRHC, 1 scrapped in 2016, 5 more scrapped in 2019. 2 were sold to SCT Logistics in 2018. 3 are stored with Pacific National and 3 more scrapped in 2026.
XR class	Loco-xr558-xr552-nog	Diesel-electric	Broad, Standard	115	1999-2006	6	Rebuilt from X class. Renumbering began in 2003. XR555 completed under PN ownership.	3 more built from scratch in 2006, all remain in service with Pacific National.
Y class		Diesel-electric	Broad, Standard	65	1963-1968	20	Used for Shunting or hauling small wagons consists over short distances.	All have been sold to Ettamogah Rail Hub or were scrapped.
RT class		Diesel-mechanical	Broad, Standard	15	1932- 1976	38	Small units for shunting at workshops or sidings.	Several remain Stored, Preserved or Scrapped.
