= V/Line RTL class =

Road-rail locomotive

RTL class
Type and origin
- Power type: Diesel
- Builder: Western Star Trucks
- Serial number: 2WLPCCCJ9TK941796
- Build date: 1995
- Total produced: 1
Specifications
- Gauge: 1,435 mm (4 ft 8 1/2 in); 1,600 mm (5 ft 3 in)
- Length: 11.23 metres
- Loco weight: 25.4 tonnes
- Fuel type: Diesel
Career
- Operators: V/Line Freight; Freight Australia
- Numbers: RTL1
- Current owner: Just Track

The V/Line RTL class is a road-rail locomotive, capable of operating on both road and rail. It was basically a truck with retractable rail wheels. Built by Western Star Trucks in the United States, the rail equipment was provided by Brandt Industries of Canada.

== History ==
It was to be the first of three for V/Line Freight, but the other two were never completed. It was purchased for short-haul duties on grain lines, and began tests in January 1996 on the Dookie and Cobram lines. In 1999/2000 it was used to haul log trains between Bairnsdale and Sale on the Gippsland line. Numbered RTL1, its vehicle registration number was MVO782. It was included in the sale of V/Line Freight to Freight Australia, and was given the custom registration plate of MVORTL as M series plates are allocated to Victorian government vehicles and with it being placed into private ownership, was no longer eligible for such registration. It was included in the sale of Freight Australia to Pacific National.

Trials of RTL1 began on 22 May 1996, under the condition that it must be treated as a train for safe-working purposes, rather than a maintenance vehicle, but when running with two or fewer vehicles attached it was also to be treated as a track machine that could not reliably operate track circuits. Its maximum speed was set at 60 km/h, and the headlights must always be switched on. The ruling grade limits were:

Grade 1 in X	Dry weather load (t)	Wet weather load (t)	% wet vs dry
50	494	191	39%
60	589	232	39%
75	727	291	40%
100	949	386	41%
150	1387	563	41%
200	1764	723	41%
400	3040	1243	41%

Newsrail at the time suggested that the RTL could be based at Shepparton, primarily serving there and Echuca with the option to also cater to Bendigo, Tocumwal, Dookie, Benalla and Yarrawonga if the need arose. In that scenario, the T Class locomotive then stationed at Shepparton would be cascaded to Bendigo, replacing its Y Class, and another T Class outside of peak seasons working daily rice trains between Echuca and Moulamein. However, this depended on the weight of the Moulamein - Echuca and Deniliquin - Echuca trains, which could often weigh more than 1,000 and 1,300 tonnes respectively, and the shunting schedule at Shepparton.

== Post-privatisation ==
After being stored at South Dynon Locomotive Depot for a number of years it was sold in 2011 to Just Track, and was used during the 2012 upgrade of the Gawler line in Adelaide. In 2015, it was used to haul wagon flats on the Southern Sydney Freight Line between Enfield and Leightonfield.

== Locomotives ==
Locomotive	Entered service	Withdrawn	Owner	Status
RTL1	January 1996		Just Track	In Service
