= V/Line G class =

Class of diesel locomotives used in Australia

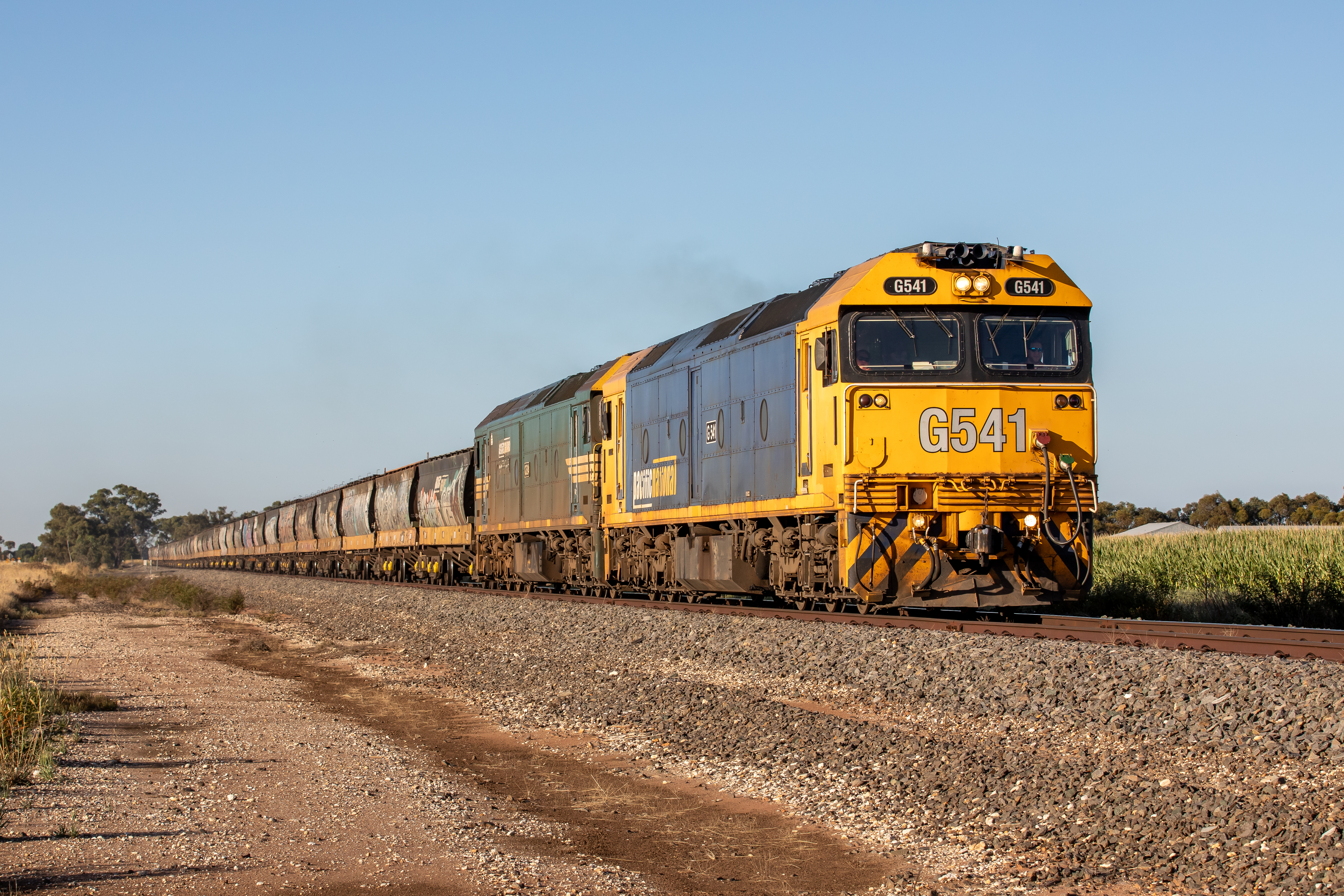
- G541 In Pacific National Livery.
Type and origin
- Power type: Diesel-electric
- Builder: Clyde Engineering; Rosewater; Somerton
- Serial number: 84–1239 to 84–1243; 85–1229 to 85–1235; 86–1236 to 86–1238; 88–1256 to 88–1266; 89–1270 to 89–1276
- Model: Original: EMD JT26C-2SS; Rebuilt: EMD JT36C-2SS
- Build date: 1984–1989
- Total produced: 33
Specifications
- Configuration
  - UIC: Co-Co
- Gauge: 1,435 mm (4 ft 8 1/2 in) standard gauge, 1,600 mm (5 ft 3 in)
- Bogies: Trimount type High Adhesion
- Length: 19.82 m (65 ft 0 in)
- Loco weight: 127 tonnes (125 long tons; 140 short tons)
- Fuel type: Diesel
- Fuel capacity: 9,600 L (2,100 imp gal; 2,500 US gal)
- Prime mover: Original: EMD 16-645E3B (G511–G515) EMD 16-645E3C (G516–G543); Rebuilt: EMD 16-645F3B (G523, G526, G529, G530, G531, G536, G541, and G543)
- Generator: EMD AR16A-D18 (G511–G515); EMD AR16A-CA5 (G516–G543)
- Traction motors: EMD D77 (G511–G525); EMD D87 (G526–G543)
- Cylinders: 16
- Transmission: Electric
- MU working: Yes
- Loco brake: Air, Dynamic braking
- Train brakes: Air
- Safety systems: Driver Vigilance
Performance figures
- Maximum speed: 115 km/h
- Power output: Original: 3,300 hp (2,500 kW); Rebuilt: 3,600 hp (2,700 kW)
- Tractive effort: Starting: 337 kN (76,000 lb_{f}); Continuous: 311 kN (70,000 lb_{f}) at 18 km/h (11 mph)
Career
- Operators: Aurizon; Swift Transport; Pacific National; Southern Shorthaul Railroad; Qube; Rail First Asset Management; Watco Australia
- Number in class: 33
- Numbers: G511–G543
- Delivered: 1984
- First run: 16 October 1984
- Last run: December 1989
- Current owner: Aurizon; Swift Transport; Pacific National; Southern Shorthaul Railroad; Qube; Rail First Asset Management; Watco Australia
- Disposition: 29 in service, 2 scrapped, 2 Stored

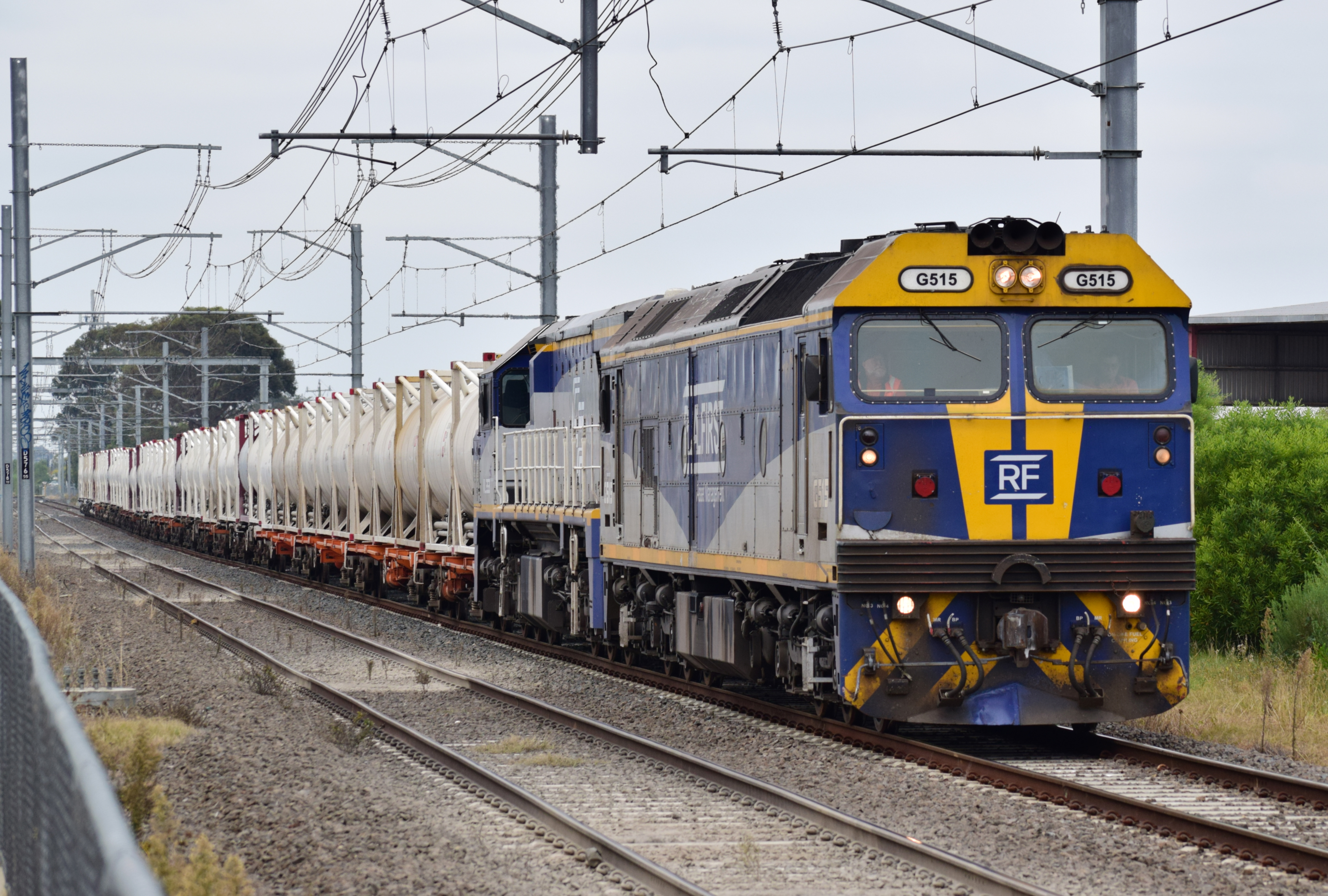
G515 and VL353 lead the cement from South Dandenong to Victoria Dock at Huntingdale

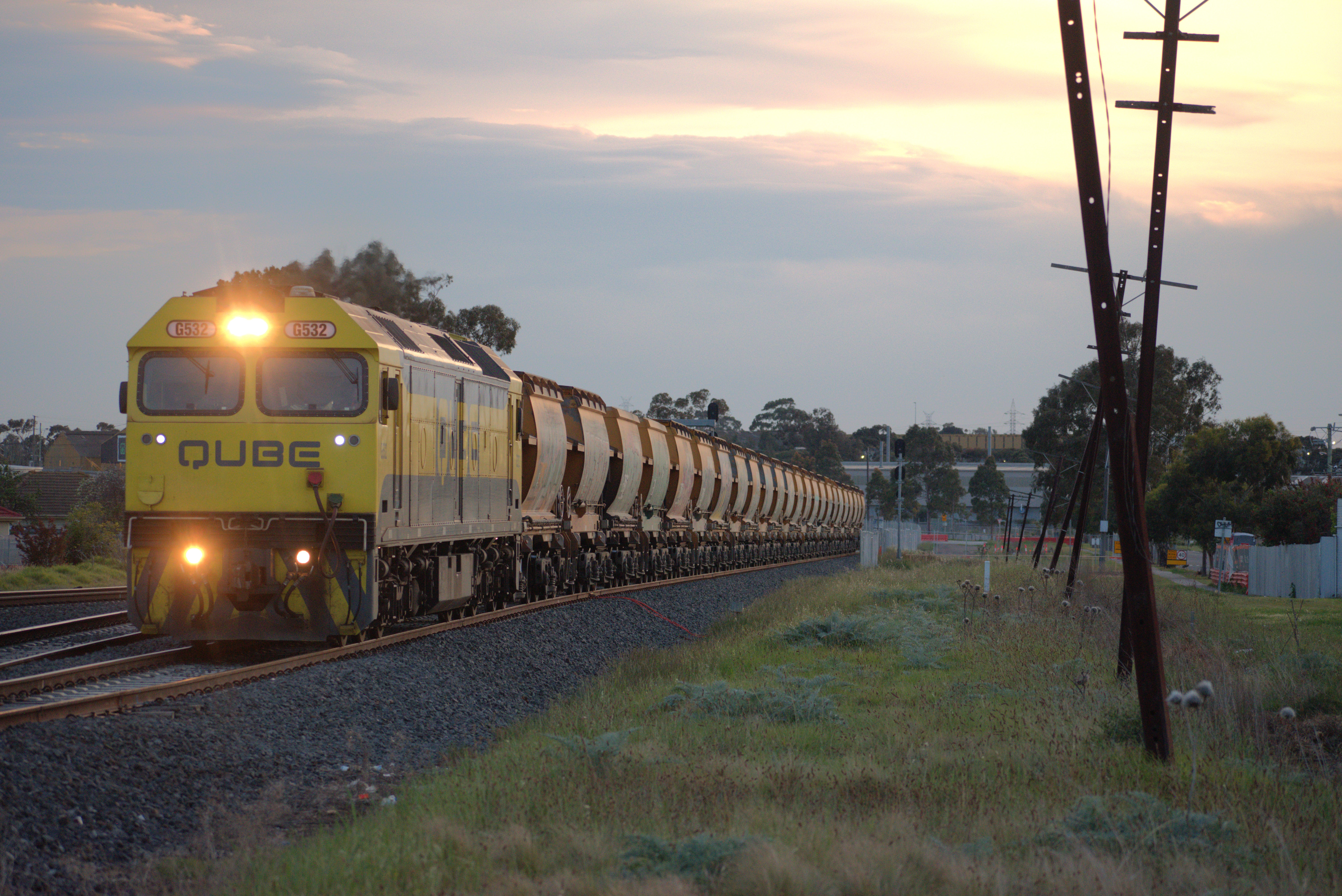
Qube Logistics G532 at Sunshine North with 9345 Empty Hanson Quarries Service. This Service runs twice a Day from either Brooklyn or Westall to Kilmore east to load Rock and return to Brooklyn or Westall. TDN's 9341, 9342, 9345 & 9346 are Brooklyn running codes. TDN's 9343, 9344, 9347 & 9348 are Westall running codes.

The G Class are a class of diesel locomotive built by Clyde Engineering, Rosewater and Somerton for V/Line between 1984 and 1989.

== History ==
By the early 1980s, the first generation diesels purchased by the Victorian Railways were nearly 30 years old, with an average fleet age of 20 years. In addition, 70% of the fleet was of 1,000 horsepower or less, a consequence of the historically large number of branch lines in the state.

Rationalisation of the rail freight task had also been carried out, with small freight consignments being consolidated to 'freight centres' from 1976. Moves had also been made towards the operation of block trains carrying a single commodity, rather than trains carrying a wider variety of freight. Grain became the major commodity carried by rail in Victoria, with the consulting arm of Canadian National commissioned by VicRail in 1983 to find ways of improving efficiency. Recommendations carried out included increasing train sizes to 50 bogie wagons and closing a number of branch lines.

=== Delivery ===
At the same time Australian National had placed an order with Clyde Engineering, Rosewater for 10 BL class locomotives, with an option for a further five. VicRail's chairman Alan Reiher, stepped in and negotiated for the five to be completed for the newly formed V/Line. The new diesels had a much higher axle load than the smaller T and Y class diesels used on branch lines, with these lines either being upgraded to carry heavier trains or closed. These were all delivered in late 1984.

A second order was placed for ten further units that were more tailored to V/Line's requirements. The first five were built with standard gauge bogies being delivered via Sydney. Over the next few years, members of the second batch would frequently swap gauges as needs dictated. In July 1986, through running without changing locomotives at Albury began with G class locomotives operating through to Sydney. Two further contracts for eleven and seven broad gauge units had brought the fleet up to 33 by November 1989. The first 15 were built at Clyde Engineering's, Rosewater factory with the balance built at Somerton.

Although primarily intended for hauling freight services, they were also used on passenger trains such as the Intercapital Daylight and Sydney/Melbourne Express. They rarely hauled broad gauge passenger trains.

=== National Rail ===
When National Rail commenced operating interstate services in the mid-1990s, seven (517–520, 522, 523 & 525) were leased by V/Line pending the delivery of the NR class.

The class were also used on the first privately operated train on government tracks in Australia, operated by SCT Logistics with V/Line locomotives and crews between Melbourne and Adelaide on 13 July 1995. This was extended through to Perth from October 2000.

=== Freight Australia ===
All 33 were included in the sale of V/Line Freight to Freight Victoria in March 1999. On 26 November 1999, G517 and G518 were destroyed in a head-on collision at Ararat when an eastbound grain train collided with a stationary ballast train at 70 km/h.

Freight Australia commenced a program of engine upgrades purchasing new, more powerful EMD 16-645F3B engines for some of the G class, with the old engines being used to repower X class locomotives, later recoded the XR class. The upgraded G classes were G523, G526, G529, G530, G531, G536, G541 and G543. These locos now have a power output of 3,800 hp (2795 kW).

In the early 2000s, Freight Australia was contracted to move freight between Melbourne and Sydney for CRT Group. The contract contained a clause that if Freight Australia was acquired by a competitor of CRT Group, 10,000 hp (7,500 kW) of locomotive power (calculated by the business CRT Group was offering Freight Australia) was to be transferred to CRT Group. As a result, when Freight Australia was acquired by Pacific National in 2004, G516 & G534 were handed over to Linx Cargo, while 2 X class locomotives went to CRT Group, and later to Linx Cargo.

A condition imposed by the Australian Competition & Consumer Commission on Toll Holdings taking control of Pacific National was that nine locomotives be sold to SCT Logistics. This resulted in nine G class passing to SCT Logistics in February 2007.

By mid 2008, SCT Logistics had received new locomotives, and their G classes were sold to the Australian Wheat Board, CFCLA and Southern Shorthaul Railroad.

Pacific National's fleet operate on both the broad and standard gauges, with the latter often operating in New South Wales.

In 2015, Freightliner purchased G533 and G535 from AWB Limited. In the same year, they passed to Genesee & Wyoming Australia when their parent company, Genesee & Wyoming purchased Freightliner and integrated their Australian operations. The 2 Gs now operate with Aurizon, following their purchase of ORA (formerly GWA) in 2022.

Qube Logistics' G521 and G532 were overhauled by Gemco and repainted in 2021.

== Features ==
The G class featured imported General Motors-Electro-Motive Division technology (prime mover, alternator and traction motors) on a locally designed frame and body. Major advances introduced with the class included cab air conditioning, onboard toilet, Trimount type high adhesion bogies, and Super Series wheel creep control to enable heavier loads to be hauled. The locomotives were designed to be of minimum mass, allowing a higher fuel load. The body consists of two side trusses with load bearing supports, roofbows and integral cabs. The side panels are made of fibreglass for the minimum weight, with various accessories mounted in removable roof hatches.

The first five units were fitted with carbody pressurisation, as fitted to many other Australian National locomotives for operation in the dusty outback areas they operated in. Differences in the subsequent units included the fitting of double blade windscreen wipers, lowering of the multiple-unit jumper receptacle, and the changing of the marker light orientation from vertical to horizontal. Recent years have seen many of the class fitted with in line refuelling, and working from Melbourne to Perth on the SCT Logistics service.

== Fleet list ==
Key:	In Service	Stored	Preserved	Converted	Under Overhaul	Scrapped

Locomotive	Name	Serial number	Entered service	Withdrawn	Owner	Operator	Livery	Gauge	Status
G511 (BL36)		84-1239	October 1984		Watco Australia	Watco Australia	Watco Black & Yellow	Standard	Operational
G512 (BL37)	Peter Pan	84-1240	November 1984		Rail First Asset Management	Qube	Railfirst silver & blue	Broad	Operational
G513 (BL38)	Mike Moy	84-1241	November 1984		Southern Shorthaul Railroad	Southern Shorthaul Railroad	SSR yellow & black	Standard	Operational
G514 (BL39)	Graham Cotterall	84-1242	November 1984		Southern Shorthaul Railroad	Southern ShorthaulRailroad	SSR yellow & black	Standard	Operational
G515 (BL40)	Rising Fast	84-1243	November 1984		Rail First Asset Management	Qube	Railfirst silver & blue	Broad	Operational
G516		85-1229	December 1984		Swift Transport	Southern Shorthaul Railroad	Linx Cargo Care Blue with Swift logos	Standard	Operational
G517		84-1231	February 1985	November 1999	Freight Australia	Freight Australia	V/Line Orange & Grey	Broad	Scrapped due to accident
G518		85-1232	May 1985	November 1999	Freight Australia	Freight Australia	V/Line Orange & Grey	Broad	Scrapped due to accident
G519		85-1232	December 1985		Pacific National	Pacific National	Pacific National Blue & yellow	Standard	Operational
G520		85-1233	March 1986		Pacific National	Pacific National	Freight Australia Green & Yellow	Standard	Operational
G521		85-1234	February 1986		Qube	Qube	Qube Yellow and Grey	Standard	Operational
G522		85-1235	March 1986		Pacific National	Pacific National	Pacific National blue & yellow	Broad	Operational
G523		86-1236	March 1986		Pacific National	Pacific National	Freight Australia green & yellow	Standard	Operational
G524		86-1237	April 1986		Pacific National	Pacific National	Freight Australia green & yellow	Broad	Operational
G525		86-1238	April 1986		Pacific National	Pacific National	Pacific National blue & yellow	Standard	Operational
G526		88-1256	March 1988		Pacific National	QUBE	Freight Australia green & yellow	Broad	Operational
G527		88-1257	April 1988		Pacific National	Pacific National	Pacific National blue & yellow	Standard	Operational
G528		88-1258	May 1988		Pacific National	Pacific National	Freight Australia Green & yellow	Broad	Operational
G529	Sam Azzopardi	88-1259	June 1988		Pacific National	Pacific National	Pacific National blue & yellow	Broad	Operational
G530		88-1260	July 1988		Pacific National	QUBE	Pacific National blue & yellow	Broad	Operational
G531		88-1261	August 1988		Pacific National	Pacific National	Pacific National blue & yellow	Broad	Operational
G532		88-1262	September 1988		Qube	Qube	Qube Yellow and Grey	Broad	Operational
G533		88-1263	November 1988		Aurizon	Aurizon	Aurizon yellow & logos with green Freightliner trim.	Standard	Operational
G534		88-1264	November 1988		Swift Transport	Southern Shorthaul Railroad	Linx cargo Care Blue With Swift logos	Standard	Operational
G535		88-1265	December 1988		Aurizon	Aurizon	Aurizon yellow & logos with green Freightliner trim.	Standard	Operational
G536		89-1266	February 1989		Pacific National	Pacific National	Pacific National blue & yellow	Broad	Operational
G537		89-1270	May 1989		Pacific National	Pacific National	Freight Australia green & yellow	Standard	Stored
G538		89-1271	May 1989		Pacific National	Qube Holdings	Freight Australia green & yellow	Broad	Operational
G539		89-1272	June 1989		Pacific National	Pacific National	Freight Australia green & yellow	Standard	Operational
G540	Wycheproof	89-1273	August 1989		Pacific National	Pacific National	Pacific National Blue & yellow	Standard	Operational
G541	Birchip	89-1274	September 1989		Pacific National	Pacific National	Pacific National Blue and Yellow	Broad	Operational
G542	Warracknabeal	89-1275	October 1989		Pacific National	Pacific National	Freight Australia green & yellow	Standard	Stored
G543		89-1276	November 1989		Pacific National	Pacific National	Freight Australia green & yellow	Broad	Operational

- G511-515 were originally built as BL36-40.
- G543 was built with (and still has) a desktop cab layout, being a test bed for the DL and AN class locomotives.
