= Victorian Railways H class (diesel) =

Class of diesel locomotives used in Australia

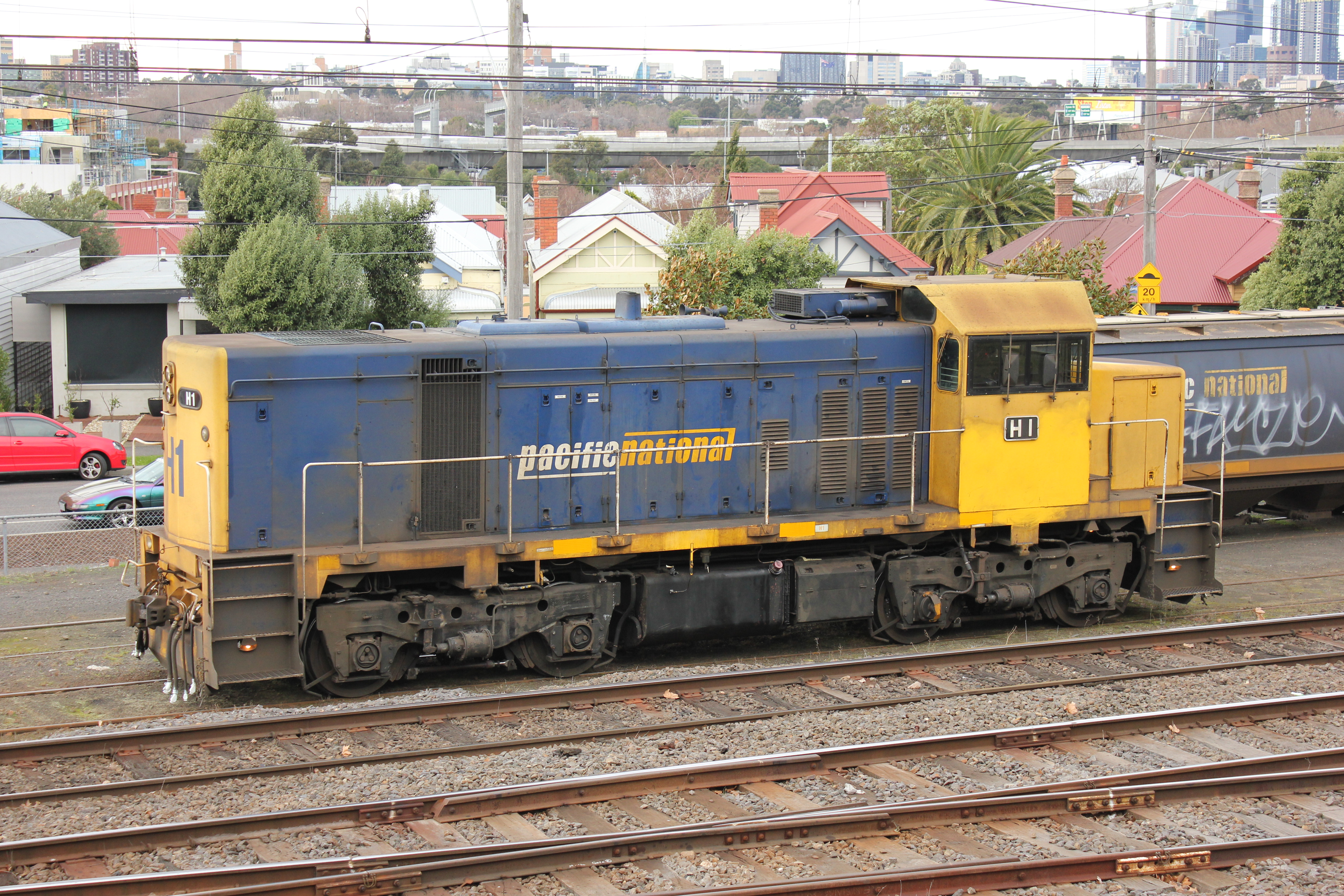
- Pacific National H1 at Kensington in June 2012
Type and origin
- Power type: Diesel-electric
- Builder: Clyde Engineering, Granville
- Model: EMD G18B
- Build date: 1968–1969
- Total produced: 5
Specifications
- Configuration
  - UIC: Bo-Bo
- Gauge: 1,600 mm (5 ft 3 in)
- Length: 12.4 m (40 ft 8 in)
- Fuel type: Diesel
- Prime mover: EMD 8-645E
- Generator: EMD D25E
- Traction motors: EMD D29
Performance figures
- Maximum speed: 100 km/h (62 mph)
- Power output: 820 kW (1,100 hp)
Career
- Operators: Victorian Railways
- Number in class: 5
- Numbers: H1–H5
- Current owner: Watco Australia; 707 Operations
- Disposition: 3 In service, 1 Preserved, 1 scrapped

The H class are a class of diesel locomotives built by Clyde Engineering, Granville for the Victorian Railways in 1968–1969.

== History ==
The H Class were built as T class locomotives with modifications for use at the Melbourne Hump Yard. They were fitted additional equipment for their duties, including extra weight for traction, "manual power control" to allow low speed operation, and an accurate low speed speedometer.

The H class were delivered as T413 to T417, but were reclassified before entering service. The class rarely left Melbourne due to their excessive weight, until being approved to operate on the same lines as the N class in January 1987.

By July 1987 the fleet was split across duties at Melbourne Hump Yard and at North Geelong's Grain Loop. At the time, engines H1, H3, H5 and T413 (the latter as a slave only) were used at Geelong, while H2-T345 were at Melbourne Hump Yard and H4 was at Bendigo Workshops for fitting of in-cab air conditioning.

All were included in the sale of V/Line Freight to Freight Victoria in May 1999 and passed with the business to Pacific National in August 2004.

Pacific National sold three of the H class to the Ettamogah Rail Hub in 2015. Two of those were on-sold to 707 Operations in 2018. H4 was scrapped in 2020, while H1 had had its long hood cladding removed and was stored in North Dynon between 2020 and April 2022, when it was transferred to the Seymour Railway Heritage Centre as part of a long-term restoration project. In mid-2023, all four of the surviving H classes were bought by Watco Australia, and are being refurbished at North Bendigo Workshops.

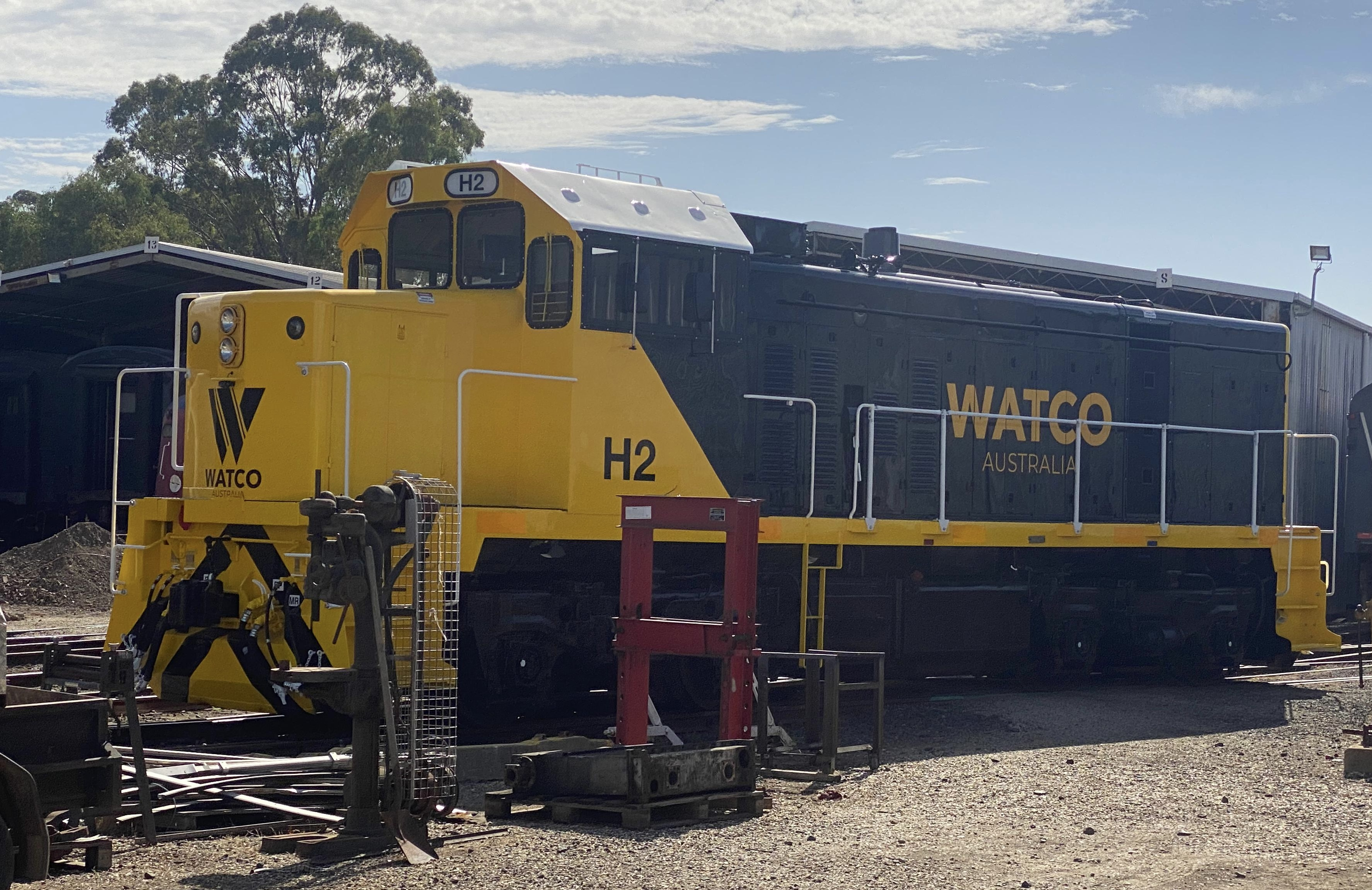
H2 at Seymour awaiting transfer to NSW for WATCO

By April 2026, H2, H3 and H5 are working at Port Kembla as shunters for WATCO, and H1 was still undergoing overhaul works.

By November 2026, WATCO has decided that it was not worth overhauling H1, and it was subsequently donated to 707 Operations for Preservation.

== Status table ==
Key:	Stored	Preserved	Converted	Scrapped

Locomotive	Delivered as	Entered service	Owner(s)	Status
H1	T413	20 December 1968	VR (Built), VicRail (1976), V/Line (1983), FV/FA (1999/2000), PN (2004), Watco Australia (2023), 707 Operations (2026)	Stored, Awaiting Restoration
H2	T414	7 January 1969	VR (Built), VicRail (1976), V/Line (1983), FV/FA (1999/2000), PN (2004), Ettamogah Rail Hub (2015), Watco Australia (2023)	In service
H3	T415	7 February 1969	VR (Built), VicRail (1976), V/Line (1983), FV/FA (1999/2000), PN (2004), Ettamogah Rail Hub (2015), Watco Australia (2023)	In service
H4	T416	24 February 1969	VR (Built), VicRail (1976), V/Line (1983), FV/FA (1999/2000), PN (2004)	Scrapped North Geelong
H5	T417	14 March 1969	VR (Built), VicRail (1976), V/Line (1983), FV/FA (1999/2000), PN (2004), Ettamogah Rail Hub (2015), Watco Australia (2023)	In service
