= Victorian Railways T class =

Class of diesel locomotives used in Australia

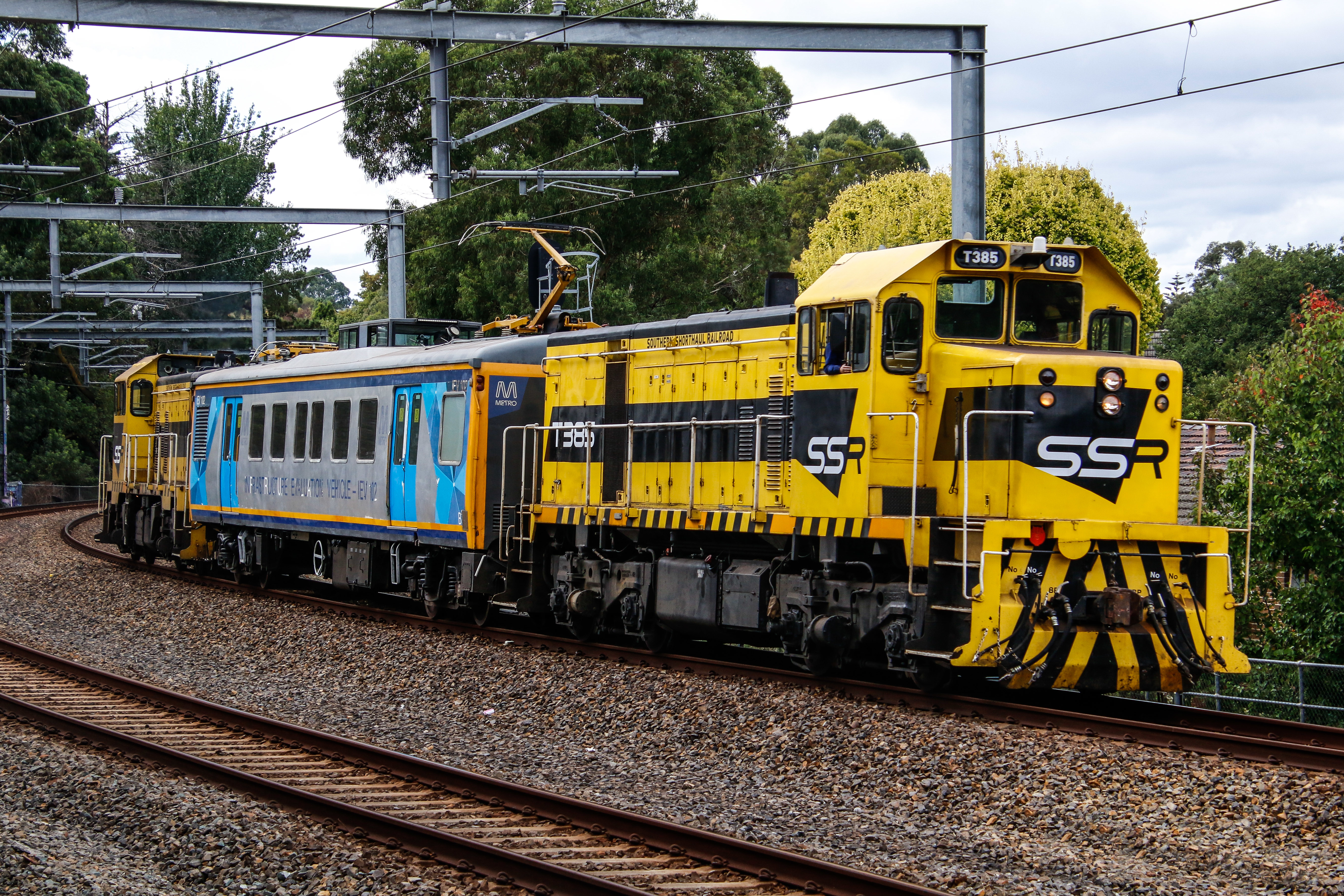
- T385 and T363 pulling an overhead and track geometry inspection carriage passing Laburnum Station
Type and origin
- Power type: Diesel-electric
- Builder: Clyde Engineering; Granville
- Model: EMD G8
- Build date: 1955–1968
- Total produced: 94
Specifications
- Gauge: 1,435 mm (4 ft 8 1/2 in)–1,600 mm (5 ft 3 in)
- Fuel type: Diesel
- Prime mover: T320–T398, T413: EMD 8-567C; T399–T412: EMD 8-645E
Performance figures
- Maximum speed: 100 km/h (62 mph)
Career
- Operators: Victorian Railways
- Number in class: 94
- Numbers: T320–T413
- Delivered: 2 August 1955
- First run: 1955
- Last run: 1968
- Preserved: T320, T333, T334, T341, T342, T356, T357, T364, T367, T375, T378, T382, T392, T395, T411, T413
- Current owner: Pacific National; SCT Logistics; Southern Shorthaul Railroad; Watco Australia; VicTrack Heritage; Various Heritage Groups
- Disposition: 15 in service, 16 preserved, 5 rebuilt as H class 13 rebuilt as P class, 4 rebuilt as CK class, 36 scrapped, 5 sold, and 7 stored

The T class are a class of diesel locomotives built by Clyde Engineering, Granville for the Victorian Railways between 1955 and 1968.

== History ==
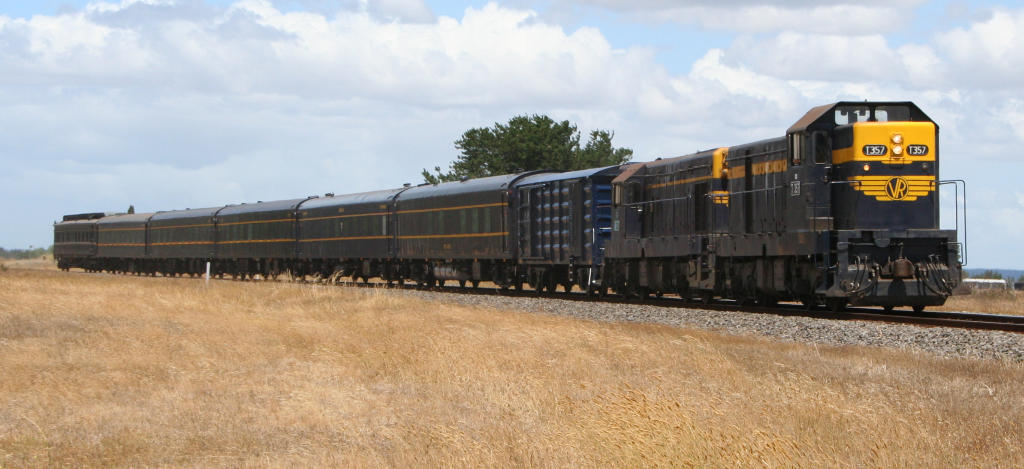
Preserved High cab T357 and Flat top T320 in January 2007

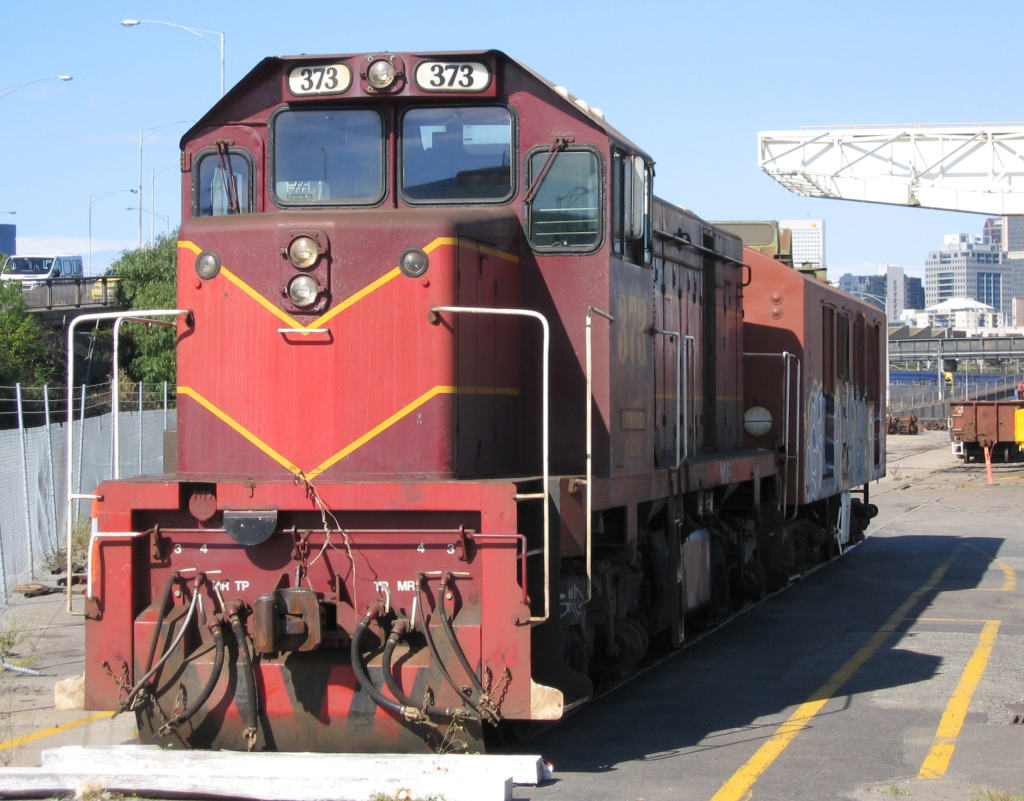
Low nose T373 in September 2005

In July 1954, the Victorian Railways placed an order with Clyde Engineering for 25 (later extended to 27) diesel electric Electro-Motive Diesel G8 locomotives to partially dieselise country branch lines.

In June 1959, the first of an additional ten entered service. Although mechanically similar to the first batch, they differed by having a cab raised above the hood line. A further ten entered service from December 1961.

In September 1965, the first of an order for 32 was delivered. These differed by having a lower nose. A final order for 19 was delivered from April 1967. The last five were built with an extra 10 tonnes (9.8 long tons; 11 short tons) of ballast weight for improved adhesion and low speed controls for use as shunting locomotives in Melbourne. These were reclassified as the H class shortly after being delivered.

In July 1969, an additional flat top unit was purchased second hand from Australian Portland Cement who had ordered it for use at its narrow gauge Fyansford Cement Works Railway, Geelong in 1956. Although outwardly similar to the original T class units, it was fitted with dynamic brakes, and became a regular on the steeply graded Cudgewa line.

In 1984/85, Martin & King, Somerton rebuilt 13 flat tops as P class locomotives. This involved a new cab and carbody, replacing the EMD 8-567C engine with an EMD 8-645E, replacement of the main generator and traction motors, and provision of a separate head end power generator. The rebuild had to use the flat top units as a base because their frames had been designed for 12-cylinder engines, and this left room for the new head-end power units to be fitted.

Although ordered as branch line locomotives, as branch lines began to close, the T class were often used on main line services. For example, due to shortages of mainline locomotives in the mid-1980s, Saturday evening Gippsland trains were regularly run with two or three T class locomotives, but these were unable to keep the schedule and would often run up to half an hour late.

T320-325, 333–335, 341, 343 and 346 were all stored out of service by mid-February 1987, leaving only T342, 344 and 345 (and 413) of the flat-top series in use.

By 14 December 1987, engines T350, 352–354, 360–364, 367–368, 370, 372, 378, 380, 383, 386–387, 389, 391, 393–394, 397, 404, 407, 410-412 were all painted in the V/Line orange and grey livery, while T351, 373, 384, 399 and 403 were being repainted. All the high-nose engines had their valences trimmed by this point.

=== Re-weighing ===
In mid-1987 V/Line re-weighed their diesel locomotive fleet, and in doing so discovered that the previously published weights were incorrect, in some cases by up to six tonnes. As part of that process it was discovered that ten apparently random T class locomotives - T370, 376, 385, 386, 390, 391, 392 and 407 - were significantly lighter than their classmates and thus were authorised to operate over the Murray River bridge at Echuca to run to Deniliquin and Moulamein (which had recently been cut back from Balranald) in New South Wales, further reducing the need for V/Line's Y class fleet. On those lines the T class locomotives could haul 1,535 t (1,511 long tons), up from 1,270 t (1,250 long tons) of the Y class. Both classes were restricted to 65 km/h (40 mph) on the Deniliquin line; (Note: Page 151 of Newsrail, May 1987, says 60 km/h (37 mph) for T Class engines to Deniliquin rather than 65 m/h (59 ft/ks).) the Y class was allowed 50 km/h (31 mph) to Moulamein while the T class was restricted to 40 km/h (25 mph).

=== Engines sold off ===
Many were withdrawn in the late 1980s with the arrival of the G class locomotives. In October 1992, six low nose locomotives were sold to Australian National with five entering service as the CK class as shunters and bankers in Adelaide. All were included in the sale of Australian National to Australian Southern Railroad in November 1997. One was resold to SCT Logistics with the remaining four operating on the narrow gauge Eyre Peninsula Railway as at January 2014.

As of July 1987, thirteen of the 28 flat-top T class units had been converted to P class locomotives and six were listed for sale or lease. T320 was nominally allocated to the Newport Railway Museum, T334 and T342 were leased to APM to work the private siding between Maryvale and their mill, and T325, T335 and T341 were expected to be cannibalised for parts; these three were noted as having 567CR engines, like the later units, rather than their original 567C engines. T346 was only a shell at this point, and was due to be cut up. T413 was used between pairs of H class engines H1, H3 or H5 working the North Geelong grain loop, while T345 was working with H2 on Melbourne Hump Yard.

In 1987, flat top units T322, T323, T324 and T343 were sold to Bob White Electrix in Geelong for use as stationary generator units, providing electrical power for testing high voltage electric motors and generators, bound for submarines. The estimated cost by the State Electricity Commission (SEC) of Victoria to install electrical transformers and a connection to the state electricity grid was exponentially higher than the rumoured purchase price from V/line of A$2,500 per locomotive. All four engines were moved from Melbourne to North Geelong on 18 June 1987, then to a siding at North Shore two days later. The locomotives had their bogies removed and were placed at the Bob White Electrix facility at North Shore on concrete blocks, side-by-side with cabs at the west end, in numeric order increasing from T322 at the north end. On 1 July, T322 was moved over by flatbed truck, followed by T323 and T324 on 15 July and T343 on 16 July. They initially retained their VR liveries, however have since been painted solid blue. These units are still located at this facility and still appear to be in use as of 2023.

Following its withdrawal by V/Line in July 1992, T375 was saved from scrapping in 1993 when Torrumbarry farmer Glen "Trainman" Boatwright purchased the 70-tonne locomotive for $25,000 and moved it to a section of isolated track on his Murray River property. Boatwright periodically ran the locomotive back and forth along the track over the next 33 years to maintain its mechanical components, preventing the engine from seizing and keeping the axle bearings in working order.

In 2026, the Seymour Heritage Centre loaned T375 for mainline preservation, performing on-site servicing, including oil replacement, new batteries, and load tests—before trucking the unit to Echuca, where it was re-railed on 5 July 2026 to run shuttle operations for the Deniliquin-Moama line's 150th anniversary after 34 years off the network. The locomotive was subsequently transferred to the Seymour depot for final mechanical certification and mainline upgrades, including ICE radio installation, cab soundproofing, and handrail replacement.

Others were sold to Chicago Freight Car Leasing Australia, El Zorro, Great Northern Rail Services, SCT Logistics, Southern Shorthaul Railroad, and West Coast Railway. A number of the T class have been preserved.

Those remaining with V/Line Freight were included in the sale to Freight Australia and in 2000, some stored examples were reactivated and fitted with standard gauge bogies to haul grain services in southern New South Wales. These passed with the Freight Australia business to Pacific National in August 2004.

=== Use on standard gauge ===
Aside from delivery runs (where engines arrived on standard gauge and were transferred within three days of arrival, allowing for weekends), (Note: For example, T367 was delivered on standard gauge on Friday 7 February 1964, and converted to broad gauge on Monday 10 February 1964.) the following are known allocations of T class locomotives operating on standard gauge. Common uses early on were to work ballast trains, and later Ford trains from Upfield towards New South Wales. Very occasionally, the engines would be used to rescue a disabled train. Colours in this table approximately reflect the liveries of the engines in the relevant time periods, but are not necessarily prescriptive.

Locomotive	Order	To SG	Ex SG	Days	Notes
T345	1	Feb 2004	Current (as at August 2026)		For Specialised Container Transport.
T355	2	16 Sep 1977	05 Mar 1982	1,631	Ex SG, to Bendigo Workshops for collision repairs
T357	3	By 02 Sep 2018	Current (as at August 2026)		For Seymour Railway Heritage Centre
T358	3	22 Dec 1961	31 Aug 1966	1,713	
T359	3	08 Feb 1962	24 Oct 1966	1,719	Damaged in "cornfield meet" on 31 July 1965, out of service until 12 September 1965, temporarily replaced by T377.
T360	3	01 Jul 1963	18 Feb 1964	232	
T371	4	By 21 Apr 2005	By 31 Aug 2006		For Freight Australia.
T371	4	By 2006	Current (as at August 2026)		For Pacific National.
T373	4	By Nov 1994	Before Dec 2000		For Great Northern Rail Services
T377	4	02 Aug 1965	c. Sep 1965	43	Date of conversion from standard gauge assumed, based on date of repair of T359 (which T377 temporarily replaced)
T379	4	By 06 Jul 2005	Dec 2021		For Pacific National. Now scrapped.
T381	4	By Jan 1998	After Dec 2000 , before Jun 2002		For Great Northern Rail Services
T383	4	By 31 Jul 2004	After 10 Apr 2007		For Rail Technical Support Group.
T383	4	By 08 Nov 2009	Current (as at August 2026)		For Greentrains.
T387	5	By Feb 2006	Current (as at August 2026)		For Chicago Freight Car Leasing Australia. Now with 707 Operations.
T388	5	c. Apr 2005	c. Apr 2005		For Freight Australia
T390	5	By Dec 2002	After Apr 2005		For Freight Australia. Never painted Pacific National blue and yellow scheme. Sold to Southern Shorthaul Railroad by 28 October 2025.
T391	5	24 Oct 1966	21 Jan 1971	1,550	
T392	5	31 Aug 1966	28 Apr 1969	971	
T392	5	c. Dec 2002	c. Dec 2002		For Freight Australia
T399	6	By 06 Apr 1993	After Apr 1995 before Sep 2001		Replaced T411 as the Wodonga shunter, which experienced a "major defect" and was not expected to be repaired.
T399	6	By Sep 2001	After Apr 2005		For Freight Australia
T402	6	14 Mar 1975	By 15 Apr 1976	398	Replaced T409.
T403	6	04 Feb 1976	c. 14 Dec 1977	679	Replaced T409.
T404	6	By 12 May 1979	16 Sep 1979	127	
T404	6	2006	Current (as at August 2026)		For Specialised Container Transport. Restored to T404, was previously CK2.
T406	6	16 Dec 1977	On or after 26 Dec 1977	10	
T407	7	05 Mar 1982	21 Sep 1982	200	
T408	7	By 27 Jan 2001	After 2007		For Freight Australia
T409	7	28 Feb 1973	13 Mar 1975	743	Replaced T411, damaged in Seymour flooding.
T409	7	22 Jul 1975	02 Feb 1976	195	
T409	7	By 16 Jan 2002	After 2010		For Freight Australia
T410	7	22 Sep 1982	07 Nov 1983	411	
T411	7	22 Jan 1971	13 Mar 1975	1,511	Ex SG due to flood damage at Seymour
T411	7	12 Apr 1973	20 Feb 1984	3,601	Re-entered service following flood damage repair.
T411	7	By 11 Aug 1985	06 Apr 1992	2,430	Repaired, painted V/Line orange; may have returned to service earlier. Was orange at Dynon broad gauge on 20 January 1985; sighted at Ararat on broad gauge on 14 and 21 April 1985. After withdrawal from standard gauge service, was stored and eventually sold.
T412	7	13 May 1969	12 Apr 1973	1,521	
T414	9	2006	Current (as at August 2026)		For Specialised Container Transport.

== Subtypes ==
The class can be divided into three main styles by appearance:

- Flat tops: T320-T346 (first order). Based on Electro-Motive Diesel G8 locomotive design, this order had a low cab and roof.
- High cabs: T347-T356 and T357-T366 (second and third orders). They differed from the flat tops by having a high cab but were mechanically similar. The 3rd order had an altered radiator design.
- Low nose: T367-T386, T387-T396, T397-T406 and T407 to T417 (fourth to seventh orders). The fourth order introduced a new low nose that provided greater driver visibility, and a more modern generator. The sixth order introduced the newer EMD 645E engine, replacing the older EMD 567 used before.
  - Engines T397 and T398, although part of the sixth order, were delivered with the original lower-powered engines. Externally, the difference was visible by single or twin exhaust stacks for the earlier and later engines respectively. However, due to noise issues, the exhaust stack nearer to the locomotive cabin was quickly welded over on some engines, and T400 had its nearer stack completely removed within a few months of entering service.
  - There was a proposal in the mid-1960s to class the newly delivered, higher-horsepower engines from T399 and above as the U Class, but this was not adopted.
  - The H class diesel electric locomotive were part of the seventh T class order (numbered T413-T417 at delivery) but renumbered shortly after delivery.
  - T360, built as a third-generation unit, was wrecked in an accident and sent back to Clyde for rebuilding, emerging with a low nose. This is due to the fourth series being well into manufacturing when the accident happened.
- T413: Built in 1956 for the narrow gauge Fyansford Cement Works Railway, Geelong as D1, without marker lights and with stock EMD footplates, chopper couplers and dynamic brakes (although it was delivered with buffers-and-chain couplers). In 1969, it was sold to Victorian Railways, renumbered T413 and modified to fit in with the rest of the first-generation T-class. This involved the stock EMD pilots and footplates being replaced with VR's bespoke variants, conversion to broad gauge and retrofitting with marker lights and automatic couplers.
- T414: Built in November 1956 as DE02 for BHP, was used at their Iron Knob and Whyalla Steelworks. Was not included in Morrison-Knudsen rebuild program like the rest of the class. In 2006 it was sold to SCT Logistics and rebuilt with a cab similar to those on the fourth and fifth generation Ts (controls laid out for long-end leading), and renumbered T414.

== Status table ==
Key:	In Service	Stored	Preserved	Converted	Under Overhaul	Scrapped

Locomotive	In service	Withdrawn	Scrapped	Livery	Current status	Name	Owner(s)	Gauge	Notes
T320 (1st order)	02 Aug 1955	May 1986		VR Blue and Gold	Stored		VR (Built), VicRail (1976), V/Line (1983), VicTrack Heritage (1996)	1,600 mm (5 ft 3 in)	Allocated to SRHC
T321	22 Aug 1955	May 1986	Feb 1990	VR Blue and Gold	Scrapped		VR (Built), VicRail (1976), V/Line (1983)	1,600 mm (5 ft 3 in)	
T322	12 Sep 1955	May 1986		VR Blue and Gold	Sold		VR (Built), VicRail (1976), V/Line (1983), Bob White Electrix (1986)	1,600 mm (5 ft 3 in)	Sold - stationary generator
T323	26 Sep 1955	May 1986		VR Blue and Gold	Sold		VR (Built), VicRail (1976), V/Line (1983), Bob White Electrix (1986)	1,600 mm (5 ft 3 in)	Sold - stationary generator
T324	28 Nov 1955	May 1986		VR Blue and Gold	Sold		VR (Built), VicRail (1976), V/Line (1983), Bob White Electrix (1986)	1,600 mm (5 ft 3 in)	Sold - stationary generator
T325	19 Dec 1955	May 1986	May 1989	VR Blue and Gold	Scrapped		VR (Built), VicRail (1976), V/Line (1983)	1,600 mm (5 ft 3 in)	
T326	28 May 1956	1984		VR Blue and Gold	Rebuilt - P23 (1984–1985)		VR (Built), VicRail (1976), V/Line (1983)	1,600 mm (5 ft 3 in)	
T327	28 May 1956	1984		VR Blue and Gold	Rebuilt - P17 (1985)		VR (Built), VicRail (1976), V/Line (1983)	1,600 mm (5 ft 3 in)	
T328	18 Jun 1956	Sep 1985		VR Blue and Gold	Rebuilt - P22 (1985)		VR (Built), VicRail (1976), V/Line (1983)	1,600 mm (5 ft 3 in)	
T329	18 Jun 1956	Jun 1984		VR Blue and Gold	Rebuilt - P12 (1984)		VR (Built), VicRail (1976), V/Line (1983)	1,600 mm (5 ft 3 in)	
T330	02 Jul 1956	Aug 1984		VR Blue and Gold	Rebuilt - P14 (1984)		VR (Built), VicRail (1976), V/Line (1983)	1,600 mm (5 ft 3 in)	
T331	02 Jul 1956	Mar 1985		VR Blue and Gold	Rebuilt - P19 (1985)		VR (Built), VicRail (1976), V/Line (1983)	1,600 mm (5 ft 3 in)	
T332	22 Jul 1956	Nov 1984		VR Blue and Gold	Rebuilt - P16 (1984)		VR (Built), VicRail (1976), V/Line (1983)	1,600 mm (5 ft 3 in)	
T333	22 Jul 1956	Jul 1986		VR Blue and Gold	Stored		VR (Built), VicRail (1976), V/Line (1983), Victorian Goldfields Railway (2007)	1,600 mm (5 ft 3 in)	By November 1986, fitted with hump control equipment to work with H class locomotives in Melbourne Yard.
T334	19 Aug 1956	Dec 1989		Ozride Pink	Preserved - Operational		VR (Built), VicRail (1976), V/Line (1983), Mornington Railway Preservation Society (2003)	1,600 mm (5 ft 3 in)	Was Ozride pink locomotive
T335	19 Aug 1956	May 1989		VR Blue and Gold	Scrapped		VR (Built), VicRail (1976), V/Line (1983)	1,600 mm (5 ft 3 in)	
T336	09 May 1956	1984		VR Blue and Gold	Rebuilt - P11 (1984)		VR (Built), VicRail (1976), V/Line (1983)	1,600 mm (5 ft 3 in)	
T337	23 Sep 1956	May 1985		VR Blue and Gold	Rebuilt - P20 (1985)		VR (Built), VicRail (1976), V/Line (1983)	1,600 mm (5 ft 3 in)	
T338	23 Sep 1956	Jun 1985		VR Blue and Gold	Rebuilt - P21 (1985)		VR (Built), VicRail (1976), V/Line (1983)	1,600 mm (5 ft 3 in)	
T339	07 Oct 1956	Feb 1984		VR Blue and Gold	Rebuilt - P18 (1984–1985)		VR (Built), VicRail (1976), V/Line (1983)	1,600 mm (5 ft 3 in)	
T340	30 Oct 1956	Jul 1984		VR Blue and Gold	Rebuilt - P13 (1984)		VR (Built), VicRail (1976), V/Line (1983)	1,600 mm (5 ft 3 in)	
T341	04 Nov 1956	May 1986		VR Blue and Gold	Out of Traffic - Overhaul		VR (Built), VicRail (1976), V/Line (1983)	1,600 mm (5 ft 3 in)	
T342	11 Nov 1956	Sep 1989		VR Blue and Gold	Under restoration		VR (Built), VicRail (1976), V/Line (1983), APM Maryvale (????), GSRS t/as Victorian Railways (1994 to current day)	1,600 mm (5 ft 3 in)	
T343	09 Dec 1956	May 1986		VR Blue and Gold	Sold		VR (Built), VicRail (1976), V/Line (1983), Bob White Electrix (1986)	1,600 mm (5 ft 3 in)	Sold - stationary generator
T344	09 Dec 1956	Oct 1984		VR Blue and Gold	Rebuilt - P15 (1984)		VR (Built), VicRail (1976), V/Line (1983)	1,600 mm (5 ft 3 in)	
T345	23 Dec 1956			SCT Red, White and Black	Stored		VR (Built), VicRail (1976), V/Line (1983), Great Northern Rail (1994), SCT (2004)	1,435 mm (4 ft 8 1/2 in)	By November 1986, fitted with hump control equipment to work with H class locomotives in Melbourne Yard. Stored at Seymour.
T346	23 Dec 1956	May 1986	May 1989	VR Blue and Gold	Scrapped		VR (Built), VicRail (1976), V/Line (1983)	1,600 mm (5 ft 3 in)	
T347 (2nd order)	22 Jun 1959	Mar 1988	Mar 1992	VR Blue and Gold	Scrapped		VR (Built), VicRail (1976), V/Line (1983)	1,600 mm (5 ft 3 in)	
T348	15 Jul 1959	Jun 1988	Mar 1992	VR Blue and Gold	Scrapped		VR (Built), VicRail (1976), V/Line (1983)	1,600 mm (5 ft 3 in)	Engine upgraded to EMD 8-645E, mid-1980s
T349	03 Aug 1959	Aug 1988	Mar 1992	VR Blue and Gold	Scrapped		VR (Built), VicRail (1976), V/Line (1983)	1,600 mm (5 ft 3 in)	
T350	24 Aug 1959	May 1989	Mar 1992	V/Line Orange and Grey	Scrapped		VR (Built), VicRail (1976), V/Line (1983)	1,600 mm (5 ft 3 in)	
T351	14 Sep 1959	Sep 1989	Mar 1992	V/Line Orange and Grey	Scrapped		VR (Built), VicRail (1976), V/Line (1983)	1,600 mm (5 ft 3 in)	
T352	29 Sep 1959	Jun 1989	Mar 1992	V/Line Orange and Grey	Scrapped		VR (Built), VicRail (1976), V/Line (1983)	1,600 mm (5 ft 3 in)	
T353	19 Oct 1959	May 1989	Mar 1992	V/Line Orange and Grey	Scrapped		VR (Built), VicRail (1976), V/Line (1983)	1,600 mm (5 ft 3 in)	
T354	09 Nov 1959	Oct 1988	Mar 1992	V/Line Orange and Grey	Scrapped		VR (Built), VicRail (1976), V/Line (1983)	1,600 mm (5 ft 3 in)	
T355	30 Nov 1959	Jun 1988	Mar 1992	V/Line Orange and Grey	Scrapped		VR (Built), VicRail (1976), V/Line (1983)	1,600 mm (5 ft 3 in)	
T356	14 Dec 1959	Dec 1988		VR Blue and Gold	Preserved - Operational		VR (Built), VicRail (1976), V/Line (1983), VicTrack Heritage (2001)	1,600 mm (5 ft 3 in)	Allocated to Steamrail Victoria
T357 (3rd order)	14 Dec 1961	Dec 1988		VR Blue and Gold	Preserved - Operational		VR (Built), VicRail (1976), V/Line (1983), VicTrack Heritage (2003)	1,435 mm (4 ft 8 1/2 in)	Allocated to Seymour Railway Heritage Centre (SRHC)
T358	22 Dec 1961	Mar 1989	Mar 1992	VR Blue and Gold	Scrapped		VR (Built), VicRail (1976), V/Line (1983)	1,600 mm (5 ft 3 in)	
T359	08 Feb 1962	Mar 1989	Mar 1992	VR Blue and Gold	Scrapped		VR (Built), VicRail (1976), V/Line (1983)	1,600 mm (5 ft 3 in)	
T360	23 Feb 1962	Nov 1989	1993	V/Line Orange and Grey	Scrapped		VR (Built), VicRail (1976), V/Line (1983)	1,600 mm (5 ft 3 in)	Rebuilt with low-nose cab following incident at Portland
T361	08 Mar 1962	Mar 1989	Mar 1992	V/Line Orange and Grey	Scrapped		VR (Built), VicRail (1976), V/Line (1983)	1,600 mm (5 ft 3 in)	
T362	19 Mar 1962	Aug 1989	Mar 1992	V/Line Orange and Grey	Scrapped		VR (Built), VicRail (1976), V/Line (1983)	1,600 mm (5 ft 3 in)	
T363	02 Apr 1962			SSR Yellow and Black	In service		VR (Built), VicRail (1976), V/Line (1983), West Coast Railway (2000), Southern Shorthaul Railroad (2005)	1,435 mm (4 ft 8 1/2 in)	
T364	24 Apr 1962	Jun 1989		VR Blue and Gold	Preserved - Operational		VR (Built), VicRail (1976), V/Line (1983), VicTrack Heritage (2001)	1,600 mm (5 ft 3 in)	Allocated to Steamrail Victoria
T365	07 May 1962	Nov 1988	Mar 1992	VR Blue and Gold	Scrapped		VR (Built), VicRail (1976), V/Line (1983)	1,600 mm (5 ft 3 in)	
T366	21 May 1962	May 1988	Mar 1992	VR Blue and Gold	Scrapped		VR (Built), VicRail (1976), V/Line (1983)	1,600 mm (5 ft 3 in)	
T367 (4th order)	10 Feb 1964	Sep 1989		V/Line Orange and Grey	Preserved - Static		VR (Built), VicRail (1976), V/Line (1983), VicTrack Heritage (1994)	1,600 mm (5 ft 3 in)	Allocated to Newport Railway Museum
T368	26 Feb 1964	Jul 1992	?	V/Line Orange and Grey	Scrapped		VR (Built), VicRail (1976), V/Line (1983)	1,600 mm (5 ft 3 in)	
T369	12 Mar 1964			Watco Black & Yellow	In Service		VR (Built), VicRail (1976), V/Line (1983), West Coast Railway (1994), Chicago Freight Car Leasing Australia (2004), Watco Australia (2021)	1,435 mm (4 ft 8 1/2 in)	
T370	25 Mar 1964	?	?	V/Line Orange and Grey	Scrapped		VR (Built), VicRail (1976), V/Line (1983)	1,600 mm (5 ft 3 in)	
T371	13 Apr 1964			PN Blue and Yellow	In Service		VR (Built), VicRail (1976), V/Line (1983), V/Line Freight (1995), FV/FA (1999/2000), PN (2004)	1,435 mm (4 ft 8 1/2 in)	
T372	14 May 1964	Sep 1989	?	V/Line Orange and Grey	Scrapped		VR (Built), VicRail (1976), V/Line (1983)	1,600 mm (5 ft 3 in)	
T373	28 May 1964			CFCLA Silver and Blue	In Service		VR (Built), VicRail (1976), V/Line (1983), Great Northern Rail Services (1994), Chicago Freight Car Leasing Australia (2007)	1,600 mm (5 ft 3 in)	
T374	09 Jun 1964	Jan 2015	2015	Freight Australia Green and Yellow with PN Logos	Scrapped		VR (Built), VicRail (1976), V/Line (1983), V/Line Freight (1995), FV/FA (1999/2000), PN (2004)	1,600 mm (5 ft 3 in)	Scrapped at North Geelong
T375	24 Jun 1964	Jul 1992		V/Line Orange and Grey	Preserved		VR (Built), VicRail (1976), V/Line (1983), Privately Owned (1992)	1,600 mm (5 ft 3 in)	Formerly displayed at private residence in Torrumbarry
T376	09 Jul 1964			Watco Black & Yellow	In Service		VR (Built), VicRail (1976), V/Line (1983), Great Northern Rail Services (1994), Southern Shorthaul Railroad (2005), Chicago Freight Car Leasing Australia (2007)	1,435 mm (4 ft 8 1/2 in) standard gauge	
T377	30 Jul 1964			Watco Black & Yellow	In Service		VR (Built), VicRail (1976), V/Line (1983), Great Northern Rail Services (1994), Chicago Freight Car Leasing Australia (2005)	1,435 mm (4 ft 8 1/2 in) standard gauge	
T378	11 Aug 1964	Jun 1990		VR Blue and Gold	Preserved - Operational		VR (Built), VicRail (1976), V/Line (1983), Seymour Railway Heritage Centre (2007)	1,600 mm (5 ft 3 in)	Engine upgraded to EMD 8-645E, mid-1980s
T379	25 Aug 1964		Dec 2021	PN Blue and Yellow	Scrapped		VR (Built), VicRail (1976), V/Line (1983), V/Line Freight (1995), FV/FA (1999/2000), PN (2004)	1,435 mm (4 ft 8 1/2 in)	
T380	09 Sep 1964	Nov 1990	Mar 1992	V/Line Orange and Grey	Scrapped		VR (Built), VicRail (1976), V/Line (1983)	1,600 mm (5 ft 3 in)	
T381	23 Sep 1964			SSR Yellow and Black	In Service		VR (Built), VicRail (1976), V/Line (1983), Great Northern Rail Services (1994), Southern Shorthaul Railroad (2005)	1,435 mm (4 ft 8 1/2 in)	
T382	03 Oct 1964			VR Blue and Gold	Preserved - Operational		VR (Built), VicRail (1976), V/Line (1983), Great Northern Rail Services (????), Seymour Railway Heritage Centre (????)	1,600 mm (5 ft 3 in)	
T383	15 Oct 1964			Cootes Green and Yellow	Stored		VR (Built), VicRail (1976), V/Line (1983), Great Northern Rail Services (????), Rail Technical Services (2004), Greentrains Pty Ltd (2009)	1,435 mm (4 ft 8 1/2 in)	
T384	29 Oct 1964	Jul 1992	?	V/Line Orange and Grey	Scrapped		VR (Built), VicRail (1976), V/Line (1983)	1,600 mm (5 ft 3 in)	
T385	14 Nov 1964			SSR Yellow and Black	Stored		VR (Built), VicRail (1976), V/Line (1983), West Coast Railway (2000), Southern Shorthaul Railroad (2014)	1,435 mm (4 ft 8 1/2 in)	
T386	26 Nov 1964			SSR Yellow and Black	In Service		VR (Built), VicRail (1976), V/Line (1983), El Zorro (2005), Southern Shorthaul Railroad (2014)	1,435 mm (4 ft 8 1/2 in)	Officially scrapped 1996, parts sold to Ray Evans, rebuilt for El Zorro
T387 (5th order)	04 Sep 1965			CFCLA Silver and Blue	In Service		VR (Built), VicRail (1976), V/Line (1983), Yorke Peninsula Railway (1995), Chicago Freight Car Leasing Australia (2003), 707 Operations (2019)	1,435 mm (4 ft 8 1/2 in)	Ex Yorke Peninsula Tourist Railway. Sold to 707 Operations for future standard gauge tours.
T388	25 Sep 1965			Freight Australia Green and Yellow with PN Logos	Stored		VR (Built), VicRail (1976), V/Line (1983), V/Line Freight (1995), FV/FA (1999/2000), PN (2004), Seymour Rail Heritage (2015)	1,600 mm (5 ft 3 in)	
T389	09 Oct 1965	Aug 1989	?	V/Line Orange and Grey	Scrapped		VR (Built), VicRail (1976), V/Line (1983)	1,600 mm (5 ft 3 in)	
T390	26 Oct 1965			Freight Australia Green and Yellow with PN Logos	Stored		VR (Built), VicRail (1976), V/Line (1983), V/Line Freight (1995), FV/FA (1999/2000), PN (2004), ERH (2023) Southern Shorthaul Railroad (2025)	1,435 mm (4 ft 8 1/2 in)	
T391	05 Nov 1965	Sep 1989	Jul 1992	V/Line Orange and Grey	Scrapped		VR (Built), VicRail (1976), V/Line (1983)	1,600 mm (5 ft 3 in)	
T392	16 Nov 1965			Slow Rail Journeys Blue and Yellow	Preserved – Operational		VR (Built), VicRail (1976), V/Line (1983), V/Line Freight (1995), FV/FA (1999/2000), PN (2004), 707 Operations (2023)	1,600 mm (5 ft 3 in)	Converted from standard gauge to in June 2019, donated by Pacific National to 707 Operations in 2023.
T393	25 Nov 1965	Jun 1992	Jul 1996	V/Line Orange and Grey	Scrapped		VR (Built), VicRail (1976), V/Line (1983), V/Line Freight (1995)	1,600 mm (5 ft 3 in)	
T394	04 Dec 1965	Jun 1989	Jul 1996	V/Line Orange and Grey	Scrapped		VR (Built), VicRail (1976), V/Line (1983), V/Line Freight (1995)	1,600 mm (5 ft 3 in)	
T395	14 Dec 1965	Feb 1992		Steamrail Victoria	Preserved – Operational		VR (Built), VicRail (1976), V/Line (1983), Steamrail Victoria (2004)	1,600 mm (5 ft 3 in)	Has full length hand rails. On hire to the Victorian Goldfields Railway - of September 2025
T396	23 Dec 1965	Jan 2015	2015	Freight Australia Green and Yellow with PN Logos	Scrapped		VR (Built), VicRail (1976), V/Line (1983), V/Line Freight (1995), FV/FA (1999/2000), PN (2004)	1,600 mm (5 ft 3 in)	Scrapped at North Geelong
T397 (6th order)	03 Dec 1966	Jun 1992	?	VR Blue and Gold	Scrapped		VR (Built), VicRail (1976), V/Line (1983)	1,600 mm (5 ft 3 in)	
T398	15 Dec 1966	Jun 1989	Mar 1992	VR Blue and Gold	Scrapped		VR (Built), VicRail (1976), V/Line (1983)	1,600 mm (5 ft 3 in)	
T399	01 Apr 1967			Freight Australia Green and Yellow with PN Logos	Stored		VR (Built), VicRail (1976), V/Line (1983), V/Line Freight (1995), FV/FA (1999/2000), PN (2004), Seymour Rail Heritage Centre (2015)	1,600 mm (5 ft 3 in)	
T400	13 Apr 1967	2019	Jun 2019	PN Blue and Yellow	Scrapped		VR (Built), VicRail (1976), V/Line (1983), V/Line Freight (1995), FV/FA (1999/2000), PN (2004)	1,600 mm (5 ft 3 in)	Scrapped at South Dynon in June 2019.
T401	28 Apr 1967	Jul 1992		V/Line Orange and Grey	Rebuilt - CK1 (1992)		VR (Built), VicRail (1976), V/Line (1983), Australian National (1992), Genesee and Wyoming Australia (????)	1,600 mm (5 ft 3 in)	
T402	20 May 1967			Freight Australia Green and Yellow with PN Logos	Stored		VR (Built), VicRail (1976), V/Line (1983), V/Line Freight (1995), FV/FA (1999/2000), PN (2004), Seymour Railway Heritage Center (2015),	1,600 mm (5 ft 3 in)	
T403	02 Jun 1967	Jul 1992		V/Line Orange and Grey	Sold - 1992		VR (Built), VicRail (1976), V/Line (1983), Australian National (1992)	1,600 mm (5 ft 3 in)	Sold to AN for spare parts for CK class locos rebuilds.
T404	22 Jun 1967			Watco Australia	In Service		VR (Built), VicRail (1976), V/Line (1983), Australian National (1992 - CK2), SCT (2006 - T404), Watco (2022)	1,435 mm (4 ft 8 1/2 in)	
T405	03 Jul 1967	Jul 1992		V/Line Orange and Grey	Rebuilt - CK3 (1992)		VR (Built), VicRail (1976), V/Line (1983), Australian National (1992), Genesee and Wyoming Australia (????)	1,600 mm (5 ft 3 in)	
T406	13 Jul 1967	Jul 1992		V/Line Orange and Grey	Rebuilt - CK4 (1992)		VR (Built), VicRail (1976), V/Line (1983), Australian National (1992), Genesee and Wyoming Australia (????)	1,600 mm (5 ft 3 in)	
T407 (7th order)	27 Sep 1967	Jul 1992		V/Line Orange and grey	Rebuilt - CK5 (1992)		VR (Built), VicRail (1976), V/Line (1983), Australian National (1992), Genesee and Wyoming Australia (????)	1,600 mm (5 ft 3 in)	
T408	11 Oct 1968			Freight Australia Green and Yellow with PN Logos	Stored		VR (Built), VicRail (1976), V/Line (1983), Vline Fright (1995), FV/FA (1999/2000), PN (2004), ERH (2023) Southern Shorthaul Railroad (2025)	1,435 mm (4 ft 8 1/2 in)	
T409	20 Oct 1968			Grey & Green Regional Connect	In Service		VR (Built), VicRail (1976), V/Line (1983), V/Line Freight (1995), FV/FA (1999/2000), PN (2004), Ettamogah Rail Hub (2023), Southern Shorthaul Railroad (2025)	1,435 mm (4 ft 8 1/2 in)	
T410	03 Nov 1968	Jul 1992	Jul 1996	V/Line Orange and Grey	Scrapped		VR (Built), VicRail (1976), V/Line (1983), V/Line Freight (1995)	1,600 mm (5 ft 3 in)	
T411	15 Nov 1968	Jul 1992		VR Blue and Gold	Preserved - Operational		VR (Built), VicRail (1976), V/Line (1983), Mornington Railway Preservation Society (1993)	1,600 mm (5 ft 3 in)	
T412	25 Nov 1968	Sep 1989	Mar 1992	V/Line Orange and Grey	Scrapped		VR (Built), VicRail (1976), V/Line (1983)	1,600 mm (5 ft 3 in)	
T413 (1st)	20 Dec 1968			VR Blue and Gold	Converted to H1 on delivery		VR (Built)	1,600 mm (5 ft 3 in)	Delivered with T413 plates and number boards.
T414 (1st)	07 Jan 1969			VR Blue and Gold	Converted to H2 on delivery		VR (Built)	1,600 mm (5 ft 3 in)	Delivered with T414 plates and number boards.
T415	07 Feb 1969			VR Blue and Gold	Converted to H3 on delivery		VR (Built)	1,600 mm (5 ft 3 in)	Delivered with T415 plates and number boards.
T416	24 Feb 1969			VR Blue and Gold	Converted to H4 on delivery		VR (Built)	1,600 mm (5 ft 3 in)	Delivered with T416 number boards.
T417	14 Mar 1969			VR Blue and Gold	Converted to H5 on delivery		VR (Built)	1,600 mm (5 ft 3 in)	Delivered with T417 number boards.
T413 (2nd) ex D1	1955	Dec 1987		VR Blue and Gold	Preserved – Operational	Steve Gibson	Australian Portland Cement (1956), VR (1969), VicRail (1976), V/Line (1983), T413 Preservation group/Plan R/707 operations inc (1987)	1,600 mm (5 ft 3 in)	The first heritage diesel in Victoria to be fitted with ICE radio. Only T class with Dynamic Braking. Returned to service in September 2024 following a cosmetic overhaul.
T414 (2nd) ex DE02	Nov 1956			SCT Red, White and Black	In Service	Georgia McKinnon	BHP (1956), SCT (2006)	1,435 mm (4 ft 8 1/2 in)	SCT Barnawartha shunter
