= Pacific National XRB class =

Australian cabless diesel locomotive

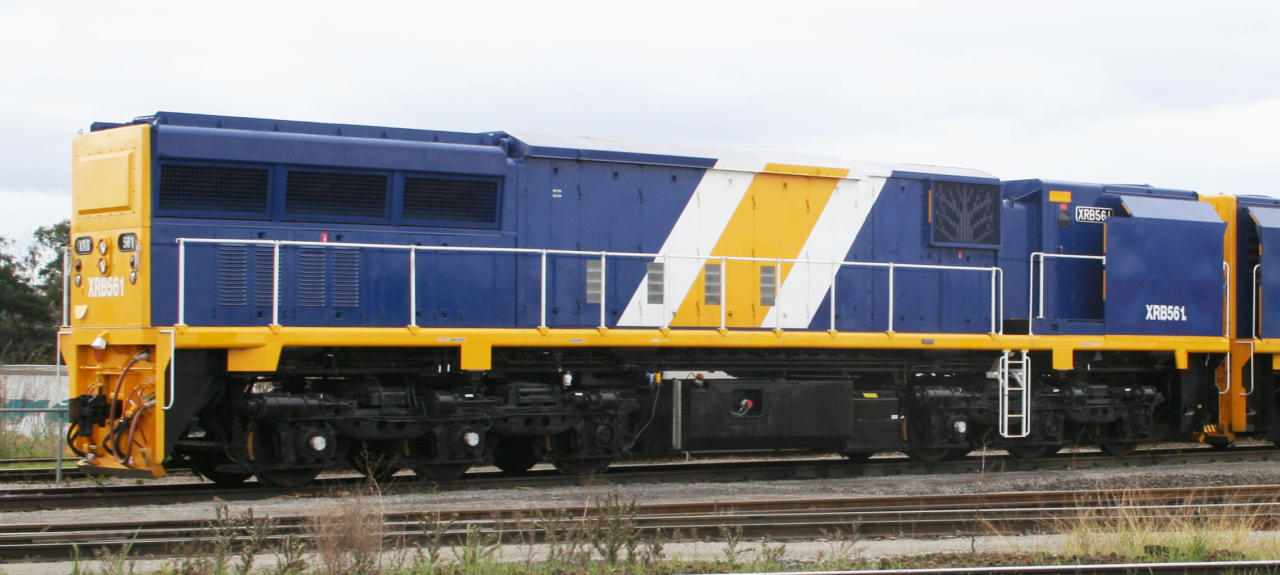
- XRB561 at South Dynon in June 2006
Type and origin
- Power type: Diesel-electric
- Builder: Pacific National, South Dynon
- Model: EMD GT26C-3
- Build date: 2005
- Total produced: 3
Specifications
- Configuration
  - UIC: Co-Co
- Gauge: 1,435 mm (4 ft 8 1/2 in), 1,600 mm (5 ft 3 in)
- Length: 18.34 m (60 ft 2 in)
- Fuel type: Diesel fuel
- Prime mover: EMD 16-645E3C
- Aspiration: Turbocharged
- Generator: EMD AR10A4
- Traction motors: EMD D77B DC
- Cylinders: V16
- Transmission: Electric
- MU working: Yes
- Loco brake: Westinghouse air brake Dynamic brake
- Train brakes: Westinghouse air brake
Performance figures
- Maximum speed: 115 km/h (71 mph)
- Power output: 3,300 hp (2,500 kW)
- Tractive effort: Starting • 385 kN (87,000 lbf) Continues • 344 kN (77,000 lbf)
Career
- Operators: Pacific National
- Number in class: 3
- Numbers: XRB560-XRB562
- Delivered: 2005
- First run: 2005
- Last run: 2005
- Current owner: Pacific National
- Disposition: All stored

The Pacific National XRB class are a class of diesel locomotive B units built by Pacific National at South Dynon Locomotive Depot.

== History ==
The XRB class were built by Pacific National at its South Dynon Locomotive Depot. They are mechanically similar to the XR class, but are B units without driving cabs. The EMD 16-645E3C engines were sourced second-hand from North America.

They were built to operate as booster units on standard gauge interstate freight trains between Melbourne and Perth, and has to be led by a locomotive with a conventional driving cab.

The XRB's original concept was to have these units remote controlled from the ground, but due to safety risks the plan was scrapped and they became mid unit power only.

These units do not have hostler controls for moving them around yards and depots, only being fitted with a dead engine device and park-brake button. As of October 2022, all three are stored at Progress Rail's Port Augusta Workshops.

In the table below are the current (as of January 2026) listings of the fleet's members:

Fleet Table
Number	Entered Service	Top Speed (km/h)	Owner	Livery	Notes
XRB560	2005	115	Pacific National	Pacific National, Queensland	Stored at Progress Rail's Port Augusta Workshops
XRB561	2005	115	Pacific National	Pacific National, Queensland	Stored at Progress Rail's Port Augusta Workshops
XRB562	2005	115	Pacific National	Pacific National, Queensland	Stored at Progress Rail's Port Augusta Workshops
