= Freight Australia XR class =

Class of diesel locomotives used in Australia

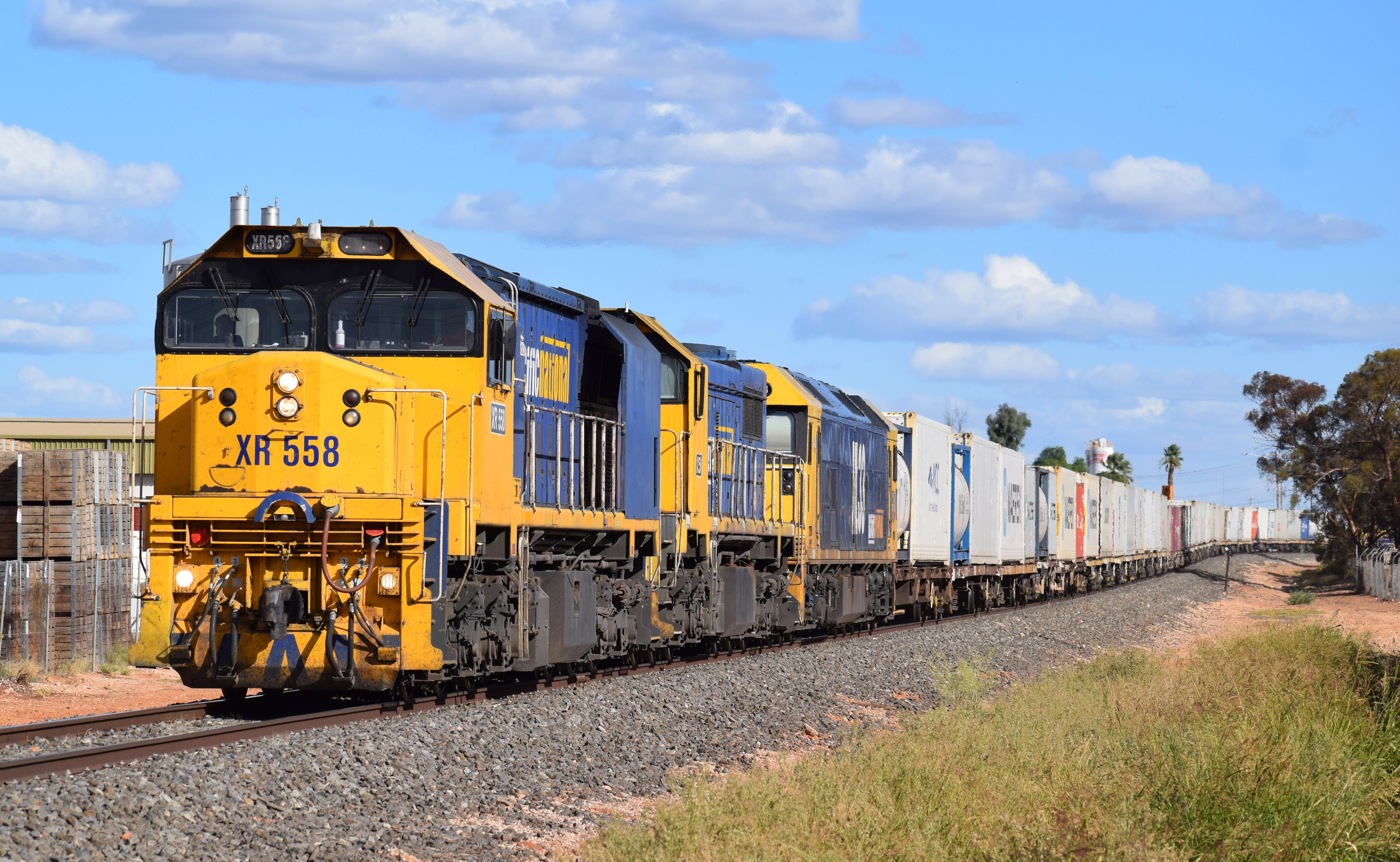
- XR558 on the Mildura Fruit train in March 2021
Type and origin
- Power type: Diesel-electric
- Builder: Pacific National, South Dynon (Series 1); Pacific National, South Dynon (Series 2)
- Model: EMD GT26C-3
- Build date: 2002–2006
- Total produced: 9
Specifications
- Configuration
  - UIC: Co-Co
- Gauge: 1,435 mm (4 ft 8 1/2 in), 1,600 mm (5 ft 3 in)
- Length: 18.34 m (60 ft 2 in)
- Fuel type: Diesel
- Prime mover: EMD 16-645E3C
- Engine type: V16
- Aspiration: Turbocharged
- Cylinders: V16
Performance figures
- Maximum speed: 115 km/h (71 mph)
- Power output: 3,300 hp (2,500 kW)
Career
- Operators: Pacific National
- Number in class: 9
- Numbers: XR550-XR555, XR557-XR559
- Delivered: 2002
- First run: 2002
- Last run: 2006
- Current owner: Pacific National
- Disposition: 8 in service, 1 pending scrapping

The XR class are a class of diesel locomotives built by Freight Australia & Pacific National at the South Dynon Locomotive Depot.

== History ==
Between 2002 and 2006, Pacific National rebuilt six X class locomotives with engines cascaded from G class locomotives, larger radiators, and a new cab resembling a stock standard GT26 (spartan cab) with only 2 windows to provide better driver visibility. The first six (XR550 - XR555) were converted from X38, X35, X40, X33, X34 and X32 respectively. A seventh (XR556) was planned to be converted from X36 but never eventuated.

A further three inspired by XR555 (XR557 - XR559) were built in 2005/6 by Freight Australia's successor, Pacific National, with minor iterations to comply with regulations as new-builds.Just like XR555, these units have enlarged side windows and front windows, mufflers, and sound proofing shields. The class are mechanically similar to the later XRB class B units.

In 2020, several were placed in storage due to a poor grain harvest. As of November 2024 all are in service on BG except for XR555 (pending scrapping due to sudden catastrophic mechanical failure) & XR559 which is on SG. XR class locomotives are common on Tocumwal container traffic.
