= South Dynon Locomotive Depot =

Coordinates: 37.806°S 144.932°E

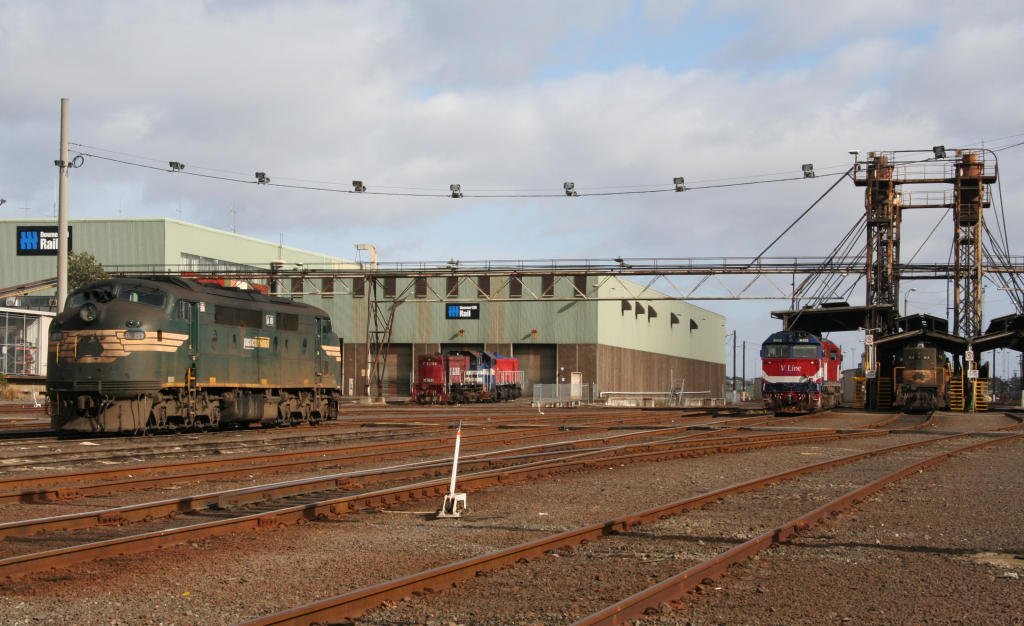
Pacific National and V/Line broad gauge locomotives stabled outside the depot in April 2009

South Dynon Locomotive Depot is an Australian locomotive depot in Melbourne, purpose built for the servicing of diesel and electric locomotives by the Victorian Railways opening in July 1961.

It was built adjacent to the Dynon marshalling yards. It has two separate turntables for stabling broad and standard gauge locomotives. It was included in the sale of V/Line Freight to Freight Victoria in May 1999. Freight Victoria Limited were sold locomotives and rolling stock in May 1999. The land and buildings remained Government property with Freight Australia having a 15 year initial lease with options for a further two 15-year leases. VicTrack remained the nominated government instrumentality responsible for the land, buildings and communications assets. The lease passed to Pacific National upon its acquisition of Freight Australia in August 2004. Downer EDi Rail operated roads 5 to 11 of the facility as part of a Victorian Locomotive fleet maintenance contract with Pacific National (PN) which ran from September 2008 until June 2016. The PN fleet maintenance relocated to the UGL operated Spotswood facility from that time. In October 2019 V/Line took lease of roads 2 through 6 for weekday interpeak storage. Bombardier V/Line Maintenance have operated roads 1 through 4 of the maintenance facility along with the neighboring fuel point since July 2010. In mid 2021 V/line refurbished roads 6 though 8 for Vlocity maintenance, particularly the standard gauge vehicles in the fleet. Roads 6, 7 (Dual Gauge) and 8 (Broad Gauge only). Bombardier, who will soon fall under the Alstom banner, will complete the maintenance. Further upgrades to Broad Gauge storage, maintenance roads as well as further freight facility upgrades are under planning with completion due in approximately 2024.

In 2005–2006 three XR and three XRB class locomotives were built at the depot.
