= Independent Rail of Australia =

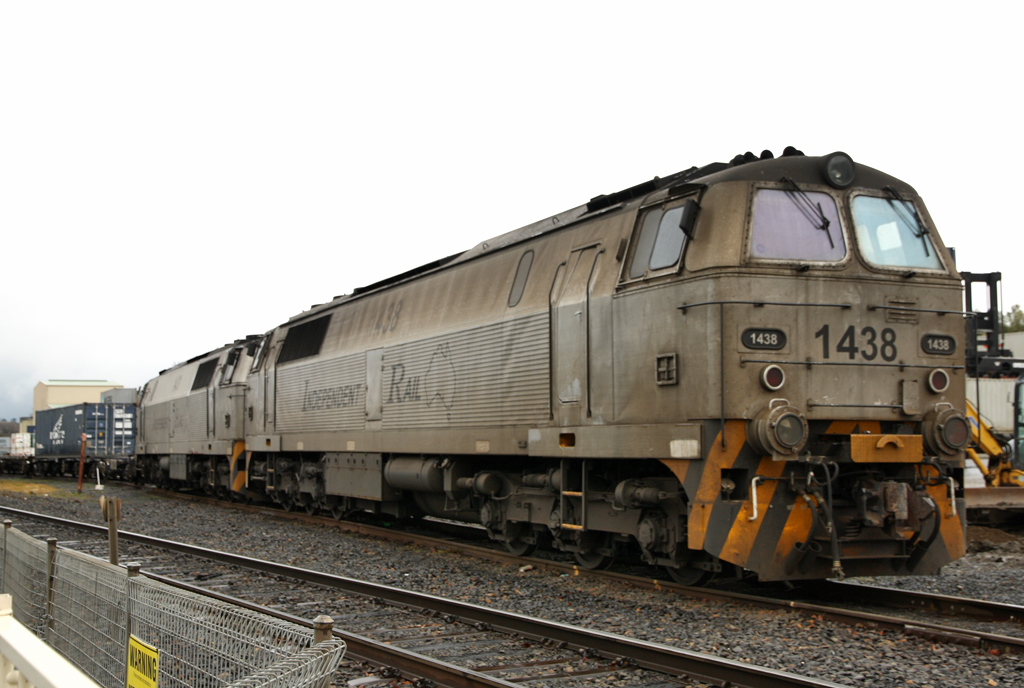
- MZ III locomotives at Blayney in July 2010
- Industry: Railway operator
- Predecessor: Parent company purchased by Qube Logistics
- Founded: 1990
- Founder: Lachlan Valley Railway
- Defunct: 2012
- Successor: Qube Logistics
- Headquarters: Minto
- Area served: New South Wales
- Parent: Bowport Allroads Transport
- Website: www.mistrail.com

Independent Rail of Australia was an accredited railway freight operator in New South Wales, Australia.

== History ==
The company's origins can be traced back to 1990, when the Lachlan Valley Railway successfully tendered to operate wheat trains between Woodstock and Cowra on the Blayney to Cowra line for the Grain Handling Authority. However, due to the line being closed for repairs, LVR grain services didn't commence until September 1993, with 4204 hauling the first services. In August 1994, the LVR operated wheat trains from Trajere on the Eugowra line to Cowra with 47 class locomotives.

In June 1999, LVRF commenced operating trip working services between Port Botany and the Cooks River container terminal in Sydney followed in July 1999 by a service between Cooks River and Carrington for R&H Transport Services. Congestion in Carrington saw the service diverted to the Toll Holdings siding at Sandgate.

By October 2006, LVRF had been sold to Stephen Heraghty of Bowport Allroads Transport and rebranded as Independent Railways of Australia.

Independent Rail provided services to Tamworth, Narrabri, Newcastle, Blayney, Cootamundra, Harefield, Minto and the Port Botany rail freight terminals. It also operated a number of RailCorp and Australian Rail Track Corporation spoil and infrastructure trains.

In June 2012, Qube Logistics announced it had purchased Independent Rail's parent company, Macarthur Intermodal Shipping Terminal, and would incorporate the Independent Rail fleet into its own.

== Fleet ==
The LVRF fleet initially consisted of 47 class locomotives owned by the Lachlan Valley Railway, 44 class locomotives from the affiliated Lachlan Alco Automotive Group and ex Australian National wagons.

In January 2000, LVRF commenced hiring locomotives from Chicago Freight Car Leasing Australia and Freight Australia and, in September 2000, from Great Northern Rail Services.

In 2005, 16 second-hand MZ III class diesels from Danish operator Danske Statsbaner were purchased and reclassified as the 14 class. In April 2009, Independent Rail purchased six 44 class locomotives from the Hunter Valley Railway Trust, having had them on lease for a while. It also purchased a 47 class from the LVR.
