= New South Wales 47 class locomotive =

Class of diesel-electric locomotives

New South Wales 47 class
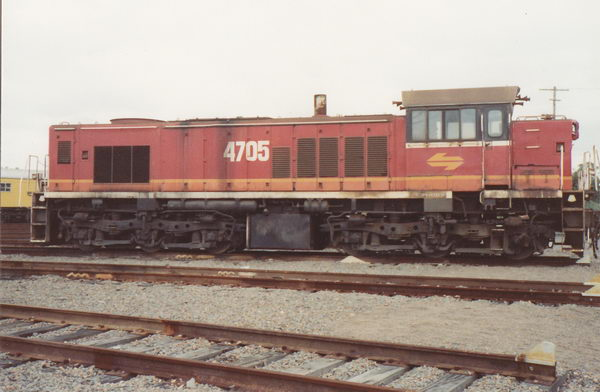
- 4705 at Broadmeadow Locomotive Depot in 1990
Type and origin
- Power type: Diesel-electric
- Builder: A Goninan & Co, Broadmeadow
- Serial number: 31-50
- Build date: 1972–1973
- Total produced: 20
Specifications
- Configuration
  - UIC: Co-Co
- Gauge: 1,435 mm (4 ft 8 1/2 in) standard gauge
- Wheel diameter: 1,016 mm (40.0 in)
- Length: Over headstocks: 14.000 m (45 ft 11.18 in), Over coupler pulling faces: 15.270 m (50 ft 1 1/8 in)
- Width: 2.834 m (9 ft 3 5/8 in)
- Height: 4.200 m (13 ft 9 3/8 in)
- Axle load: 14.2 t (14.0 long tons; 15.7 short tons)
- Loco weight: 85.3 t (84.0 long tons; 94.0 short tons)
- Fuel type: Diesel
- Fuel capacity: 3,300 L (726 imp gal; 872 US gal)
- Lubricant cap.: 416 L (92 imp gal; 110 US gal)
- Coolant cap.: 600 L (132 imp gal; 159 US gal)
- Sandbox cap.: 0.44 m^{3} (16 cu ft)
- Prime mover: Caterpillar 16-D399TA
- RPM range: 650–1300
- Engine type: Four-stroke 16 Cylinder diesel
- Alternator: Hitachi HI508 AR
- Traction motors: Hitachi HS366 AR, 6 of
- Cylinders: 16
- Cylinder size: 158.75 mm × 203 mm (6.25 in × 7.99 in)
Performance figures
- Maximum speed: 113 km/h (70 mph)
- Power output: Gross: 840 kW (1,126 hp), For traction: 746 kW (1,000 hp)
- Tractive effort: Continuous: 171.07 kN (38,458 lbf) at 11.8 km/h (7.3 mph)
Career
- Operators: Public Transport Commission
- Number in class: 20
- Numbers: 4701–4720
- Delivered: 1972
- First run: July 1972
- Last run: May 1973
- Preserved: 4701, 4702, 4705, 4706, 4708, 4716
- Current owner: Lachlan Valley Railway
- Disposition: 11 Scrapped, 3 Operational, 3 Stored, 6 Preserved, 1 Static, 1 Under Restoration

The 47 class are a class of diesel-electric locomotives built by A Goninan & Co for the Public Transport Commission in 1972–1973.

== History ==
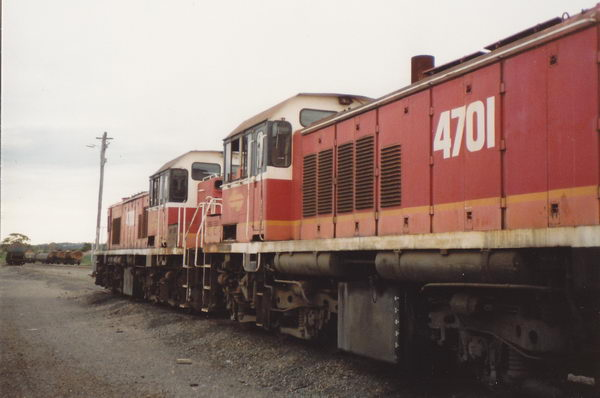
4701 & 4703 at Broadmeadow Locomotive Depot in 1990

Twenty were ordered from A Goninan & Co with the first delivered in July 1972. After undergoing acceptance trials, the first entered service in September 1972 with the last delivered in May 1973. Originally intended for use hauling coal services in the Hunter Valley, they were allocated to Bathurst to operate services in the state's west from Lithgow to Euabalong West, Bourke and Cootamundra and all branches in between. Their excellent ride qualities saw them find favour with crews, although they did suffer from overheating with one destroyed by fire in April 1974 and another in a collision in March 1977.

In January 1981, it was decided to transfer the class to Broadmeadow to take up the duties they had originally been built for being used to haul coal services from Belmont, Dudley, Lambton and Pelton. They also saw use on services to Werris Creek, Tamworth and Moree. They continued to return to Bathurst Workshops for overhaul. A downturn in traffic as a result of a drought saw them placed in store at Parkes in 1982/83 before all were reactivated in 1984 resuming duties out of Broadmeadow.

In 1987, 4719 was withdrawn from service and stored at Bathurst Workshops as a source parts to keep sister units working, being joined by 4715 in November 1988. In 1989, both were moved from to Cardiff Workshops to be rebuilt as HTV2000, a Heavy Test Vehicle.

Despite their popularity with crews, their high maintenance costs saw them selected for withdrawal in 1989 with only six in service or under repair by November 1989 with the last being taken out of service in December 1990.

In 1990, the Lachlan Valley Railway purchased 47s 01 and 08 followed in February 1994 by 02, 03, 07 and 16. A later purchase was 4717. These were used to operate wheat services in the Cowra region in 1993/94.

In June 1999, they commenced operating trip working services between Port Botany and the Cooks River container terminal in Sydney for Lachlan Valley Rail Freight followed in July 1999 by a service between Cooks River and Carrington for R&H Transport Services.

As of July 2019, 3 Lachlan Valley Railway units remain in service, primarily operating AK Car test trains for ARTC. In March 2022, 4717 was cut up for scrap.

== Fleet status ==
Key:	In service	Stored	Preserved	Rebuilt	Under Overhaul	Scrapped

Locomotive	Serial No	Completed	Current Owner	Livery	Status
4701	31	Jul 72	Lachlan Valley Railway	SSR Yellow	Preserved, Operational
4702	32	Sep 72	Lachlan Valley Railway	PTC Indian Red	Preserved, Operational
4703	33	Oct 72	Lachlan Valley Railway	LVRF Green/White/Yellow	Preserved, Operational
4704	34	Oct 72	SRA	SRA Candy	Scrapped
4705	35	Nov 72	Privately owned	PTC Indian red	Static Display, Werris Creek
4706	36	Nov 72	Dorrigo Steam Railway & Museum	SRA Candy	Preserved
4707	37	Nov 72	Lachlan Valley Railway	SRA Candy	Preserved, Under Restoration Orange East Fork
4708	38	Nov 72	Lachlan Valley Railway	PTC Indian Red	Preserved, Operational
4709	39	Dec 72	SRA	Reverse Tuscan	Scrapped
4710	40	Dec 72	SRA	Reverse Tuscan	Scrapped
4711	41	Dec 72	SRA	Reverse Tuscan	Scrapped
4712	42	Dec 72	SRA	SRA Candy	Scrapped
4713	43	Jan 73	SRA	Reverse Tuscan	Scrapped
4714	44	Jan 73	SRA	SRA Candy	Scrapped
4715	45	Jan 73	SRA	Reverse Tuscan	Scrapped
4716	46	Mar 73	Lachlan Valley Railway	PTC Indian red	Preserved, Stored Orange East Fork
4717	47	Mar 73	Qube	R&H Transport	Scrapped
4718	48	Mar 73	SRA	SRA Candy	Scrapped
4719	49	Apr 73	Lachlan Valley Railway	Yellow	Converted to HTV2000
4720	50	May 73	SRA	SRA Candy	Scrapped
