= D9 class =

D9 class or Class D9 may refer to:

- BHP Port Kembla D9 class, diesel-electric locomotives
- LNER Class D9, 4-4-0 steam locomotives
