= Moorebank Intermodal Terminal =

- Interactive map of Moorebank Intermodal Terminal

Location
- Country: Australia
- Location: Moorebank, Sydney, New South Wales, Australia
- Coordinates: 33°57′02.6″S 150°55′23.9″E

Details
- Opened: 2019
- Owned by: Qube Holdings
- Land area: 243 hectares (600 acres)
- Employees: 6,800 (expected)

Statistics
- Website moorebankintermodalprecinct.com.au

The Moorebank Intermodal Terminal is an intermodal terminal in the south-western Sydney suburb of Moorebank, in New South Wales, Australia.

Moorebank has two intermodal terminals. The first to be operational was the IMEX (Import Export) terminal to transfer containers to Port Botany. The second is the Interstate Terminal.

== History ==
In 2010, the Department of Finance and Deregulation conducted a feasibility study into the development of the intermodal terminal at Moorebank in south-western Sydney. In April 2012 the federal government committed to developing the Moorebank Intermodal Terminal with private sector involvement. In December 2012 the Moorebank Intermodal Company (MIC) was formed as a Government business enterprise to oversee the development of the terminal.

The MIC conducted an expression of interest process to identify suitably experienced and qualified organisations to build and operate the terminal. The Sydney Intermodal Terminal Alliance of Qube Holdings (67%) and Aurizon (33%) was named as the preferred proponent with an agreement signed in June 2015. In August 2016, Qube Holdings bought out Aurizon's shareholding.

The terminal is built on 240 hectares of land formerly occupied by the Australian Army. The site is connected to the Southern Sydney Freight Line near Casula station providing access to Port Botany. It is also close to the M5 Motorway and its junctions with the M7 and Hume Highway. Residents who are opposed to the terminal say that PFAS, firefighting chemicals, were used on the land, which can bio-accumulate.

Planning permission was granted by the Department of Planning and Environment in June 2016. Construction began in April 2017 and was initially expected to be completed by September 2022.

The interstate terminal had operations launched by the Prime Minister of Australia, Anthony Albanese on 5 April 2024.
