= DSB Class MZ =

Danish railways diesel-electric locomotive

Danish MZ Class
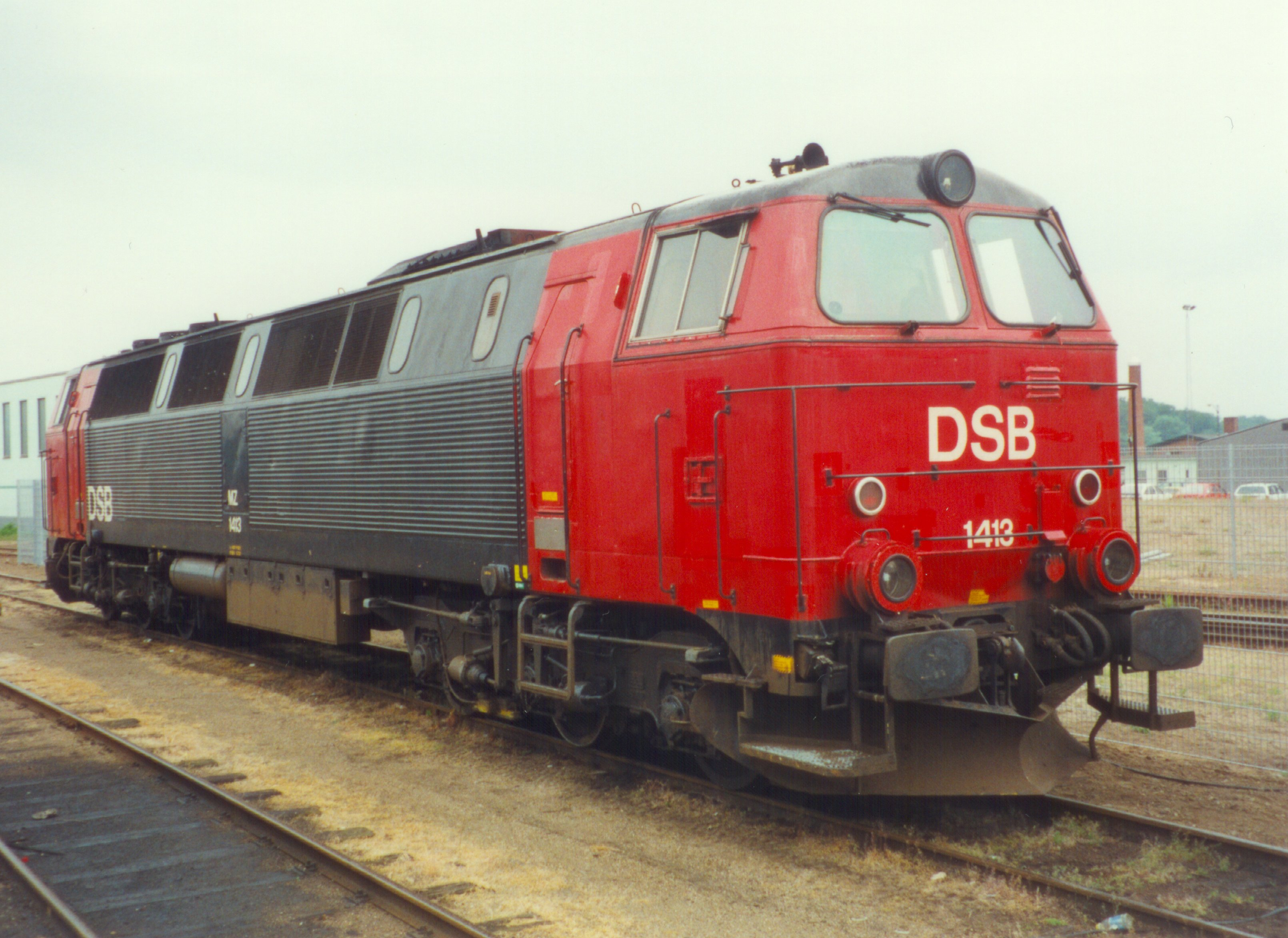
- DSB MZ 1413
Type and origin
- Power type: Diesel-electric
- Builder: NOHAB
- Model: EMD J30C-2
- Build date: 1967–1968 (I)*; 1970 (II)*; 1972–1974 (III)*; 1977–1978 (IV)*
- Total produced: total: 61; 10 (I)*; 16 (II)*; 20 (III)*; 15 (IV)*
Specifications
- Configuration
  - UIC: Co′Co′
- Gauge: 1,435 mm (4 ft 8 1/2 in)
- Wheel diameter: 1,015 mm (39.96 in)
- Length: 20.800 m (68 ft 2 7/8 in) (I – II)*; 21.000 m (68 ft 10 3/4 in) (III – IV)*
- Height: 4,260 mm (167 3/4 in)
- Loco weight: 116.5 tonnes (114.7 long tons; 128.4 short tons) (I – II)*; 121.2 tonnes (119.3 long tons; 133.6 short tons) (III)*; 123 tonnes (121 long tons; 136 short tons) (IV)*
- Prime mover: EMD 16-645E3 (I - II); EMD 20-645E3 (III - IV)
- Engine type: two-stroke diesel
- Cylinders: V16 (I – II); V20 (III – IV)
- Transmission: Electric
Performance figures
- Maximum speed: 143 km/h (89 mph) (I – II)*; 165 km/h (103 mph) (III – IV)*
- Power output: 2,426 kW (3,253 hp) (I – II)*; 2,867 kW (3,845 hp) (III- IV)*
- Tractive effort: 390 kN (88,000 lb_{f})
Career
- Operators: Danske Statsbaner
- Numbers: 1401–1461
- Nicknames: AUS Cake Tins, Helgas, Toasters, The Royal Dunny
- Sources : * scanditrain.de

DSB class MZ was a series of 61 diesel-electric locomotives operated by Danske Statsbaner. They were built by NOHAB between 1967 and 1978 under licence from General Motors EMD with subcontractors Thrige-Titan (traction motors) and Frichs (chassis, bodywork). There were four series of the locomotive built, designated I – IV.

Twenty were sold to Railion Denmark in 2001, two were sold to Spain's COMSA Rail Transport in 2004, and 16 of the III series were exported to Australia in the late 2000s. As of 2010 most of the remainder of the class are divided between various Danish, Swedish and Norwegian companies. In Sweden the locomotives have received the designation TMZ.

== Sub-series ==
=== MZ I ===
Ten units of the first series were built between 1967 and 1969, each costing DKK ~2.4 million each. Class leader MZ 1401 was preserved by the Danish Railway Museum in 2000, remaining operational until withdrawn in September 2020. The rest were sold to various Swedish operators between 2002 and 2006 including three to Motala Verkstad, two to Svensk Tågteknik (STT), and single units to TÅGAB, Inlandsgods, BK Tåg and Three T AB.

=== MZ II ===
Sixteen units of the second series were built in 1970. They have a similar appearance and many of the same characteristics as the I-series.

Seven units were sold to Railion Denmark in 2001. Most locomotives were sold to various Swedish and Norwegian operators between 2003 and 2006 including two units each to BK Tåg, TÅGAB and the Norwegian National Rail Administration (Jernbaneverket), and single units to Motala Verkstad and Svensk Tågteknik AB. Locomotive number MZ 1425 has been rented to Railion between 2001 and 2003 and in 2004 was equipped with automatic coupling for hauling of IC4 multiple unit trains. As for 2015, 1425 was sold to Svensk Tågkraft making the 2nd series the only series not to exist in Denmark anymore.

=== MZ III ===
Twenty units of the third series were built between 1972 and 1974 at a cost of DKK ~3.75 million each. They have a slightly different appearance and were equipped with more powerful engines (20-cylinder version) and higher top speed. The maximum hauled train weight is increased by 200 tonnes (197 long tons; 220 short tons) over the second series.

Two units were sold to Comsa of Spain in 2004. Two were sold to BLDX of Denmark in 2008.

Sixteen were sold to Australian operator Independent Rail of Australia (IRA) in 2006 having been in store for some years. All were overhauled in Copenhagen before being exported. They were shipped between 2006 and 2008. The last batch of six were damaged in transit off Bermuda when the MV Emmagracht encountered rough seas. All were off-loaded in Savannah, Georgia to be cleaned of oil contamination. Upon arriving in Australia, 1441 and 1444 were declared write-offs and scrapped at Bradken's Braemar facility in 2010.

After being regeared with a top speed of 105 km/h, the remainder entered service retaining their existing numbers. All were included in the purchase of the IRA business by Qube. In December 2011 1438 incurred major damage at Port Botany and was later scrapped. Having been in store at Port Botany for some period, 1446 moved to Cardiff Locomotive Workshops in 2016.

Number	Status	Notes
1427	Operational	Port Botany Sydney NSW
1428	Operational	Port Botany Sydney NSW
1429	Stow	Stow at Cardiff
1431	Operational	
1432	Operational	Port Botany Sydney NSW
1433	Withdrawn	Following locomotive fire 15/4/26
1434	Scrapped	
1435	Operational	
1437	Operational	
1438	Scrapped	Scrapped after major accident damage sustained at Port Botany
1440	Stored	Following a collision with a container, was returned to traffic Sep 2020 with a rebuilt cab at one end. Stored Junee
1441	Scrapped	Written off on arrival, scrapped Bradken 2010
1443	Stored	Stored at Cardiff
1444	Scrapped	Written off on arrival, scrapped Bradken 2010
1445	Stored	Stored at Cardiff
1446	Scrapped	Shell stored at Cardiff

As for 2018, there is only one unit of the 3rd series remaining in Denmark. Its last use was in 2016, and has since stayed in Niebüll for two years, before yet again returning to Denmark. However it was left on a siding at CFL Cargo Denmark (now Viking Rail) in Padborg. Doomed by many as useless due to it being in bad condition, no one saw potential in leasing 1439. In late quarter of 2024 however, it was sold to The Golden Train in Norway after nearly 9 years out of service, and looking quite shabby. The locomotive is currently undergoing heavily overhaul at Railcare Tåg AB's workshop, the project can even be followed on Railcare Tågs Instagram. While this is good news for a locomotive that seemed doomed, it was also the last Class MZ III to leave Denmark, making this series extinct in Denmark, along with the second series.

=== MZ IV ===
Fifteen units of the fourth series were built between 1977 and 1978. It has the same performance as the MZ III, but a slightly different appearance (narrower front window).

Two units were sold to TÅGAB of Sweden in 2006, scrapped in 2015, five to Baneservice, Norway in 2009, now owned by NRFAB in Sweden. The remainder have been in service with Railion Denmark (Now DB Cargo Scandinavia) since 2001, as for 2018, 6 of the MZ IV remain in service in Denmark. 2 units were sold 2015 to NRFAB in Sweden.

== Preservation ==
MZ 1401 is part of the collection of the Danish Railway Museum.

== See also ==
- RENFE Class 333, the original class 333s were built to the same NOHAB design as the DSB MZ

== Gallery ==
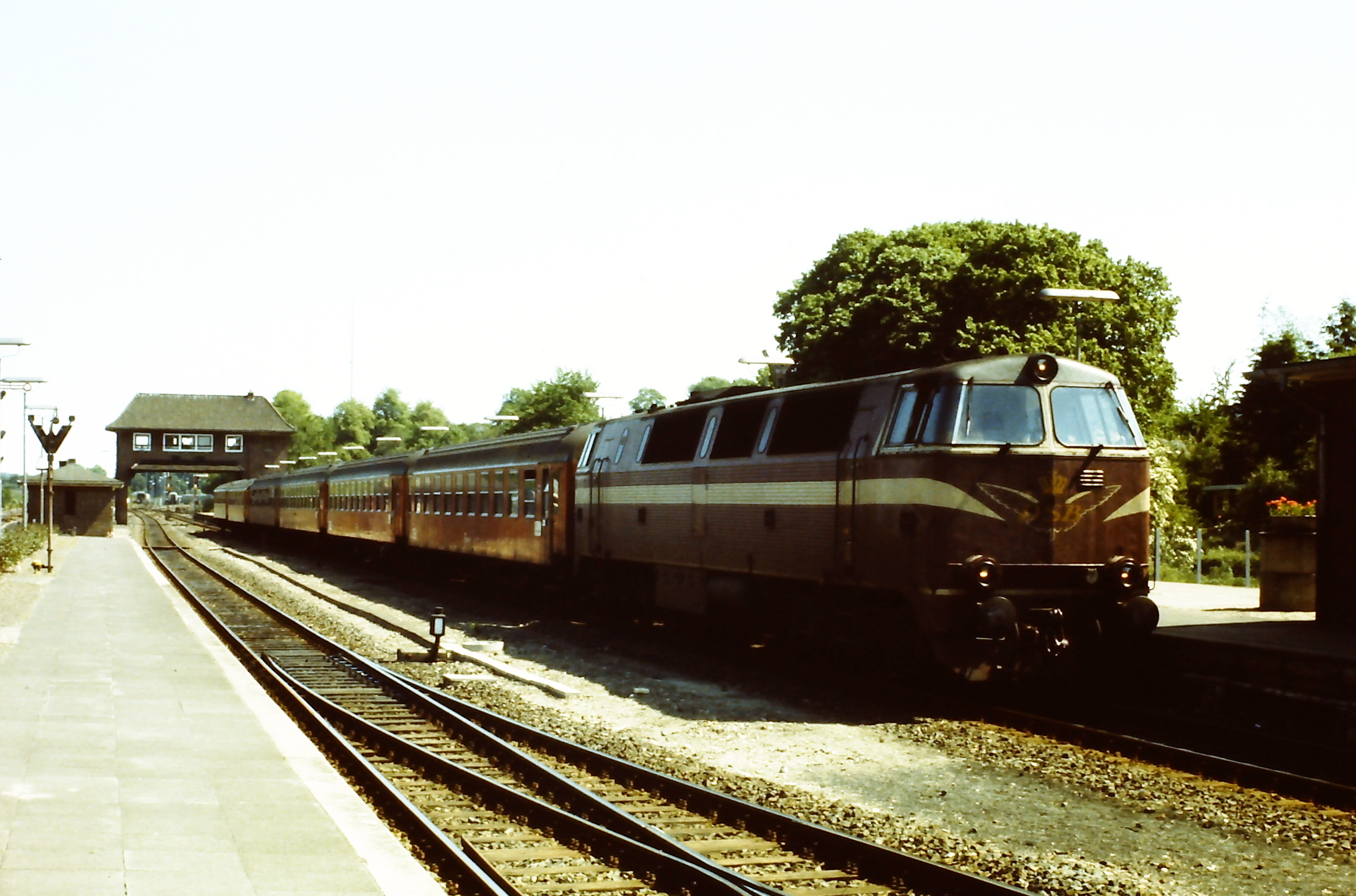
MZ 1418

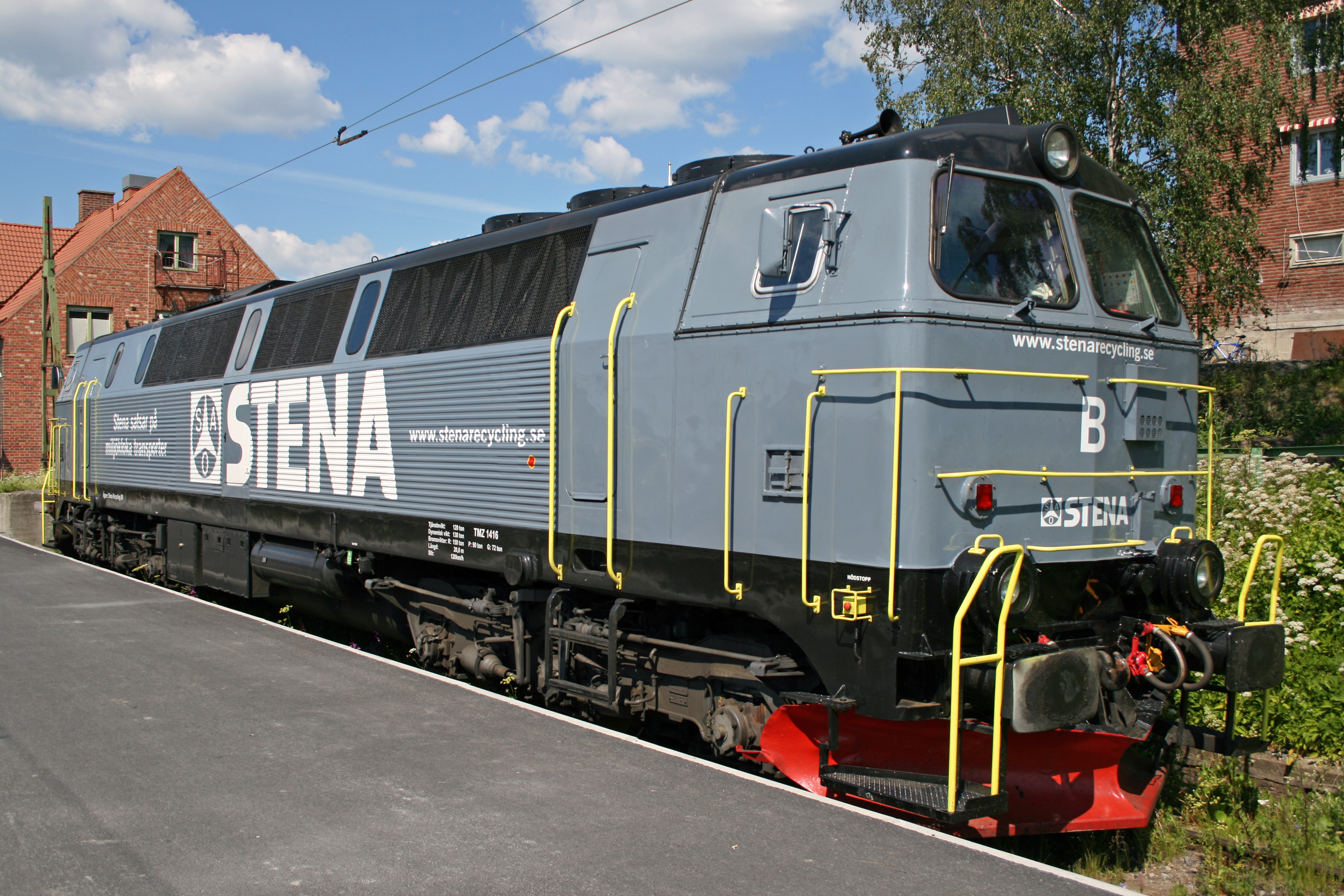
Class MZ in private ownership at Östersund (2008)

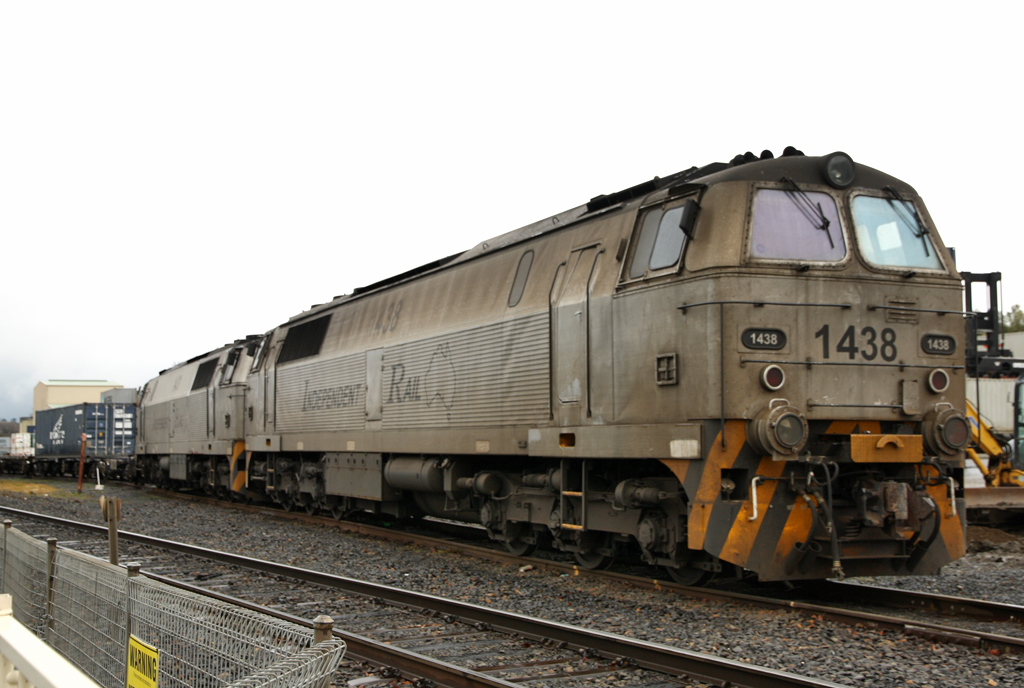
Independent Rail MZ 1438 at Blayney in July 2010

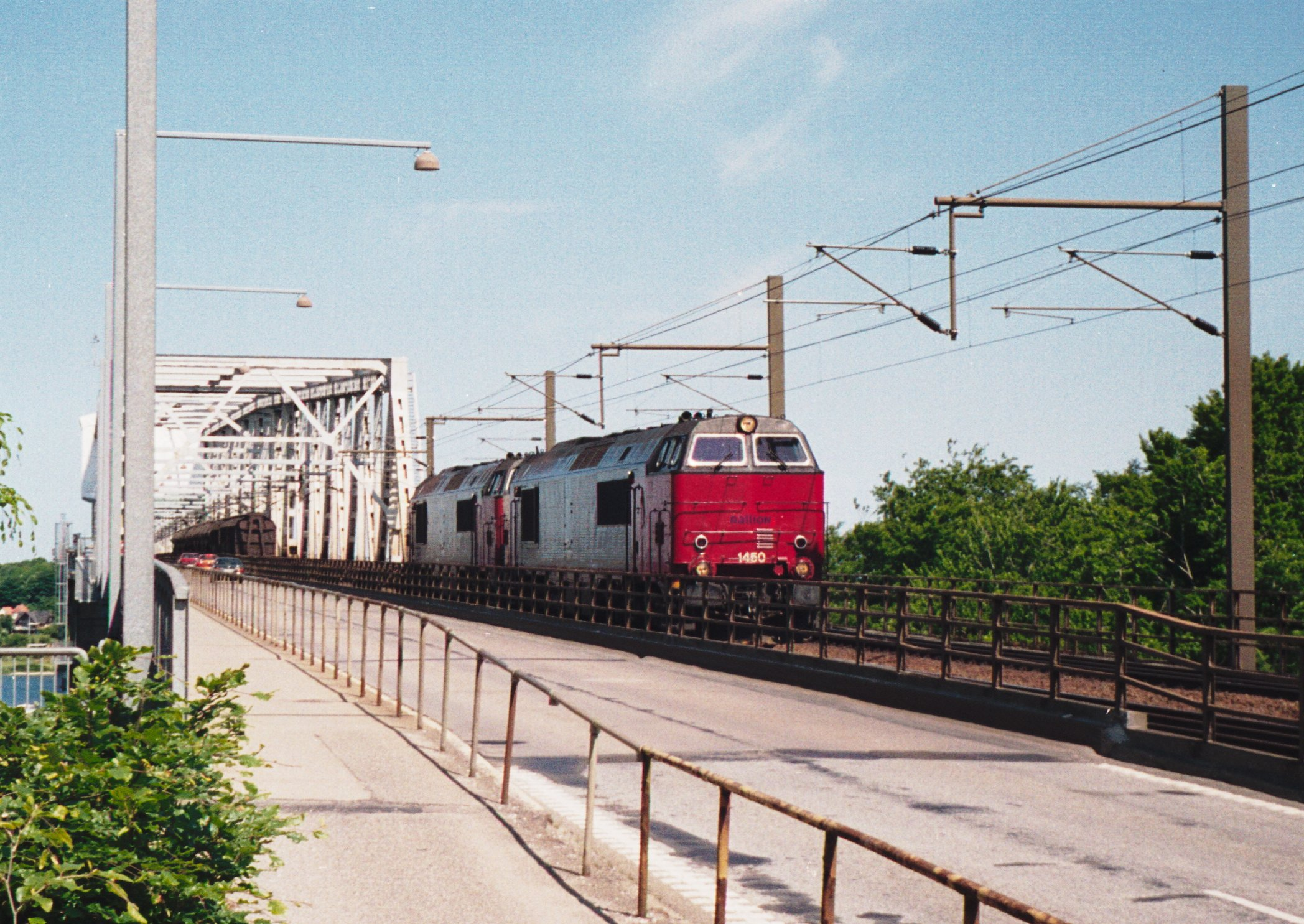
Railion Denmark MZ 1450 and 1458 (2003)

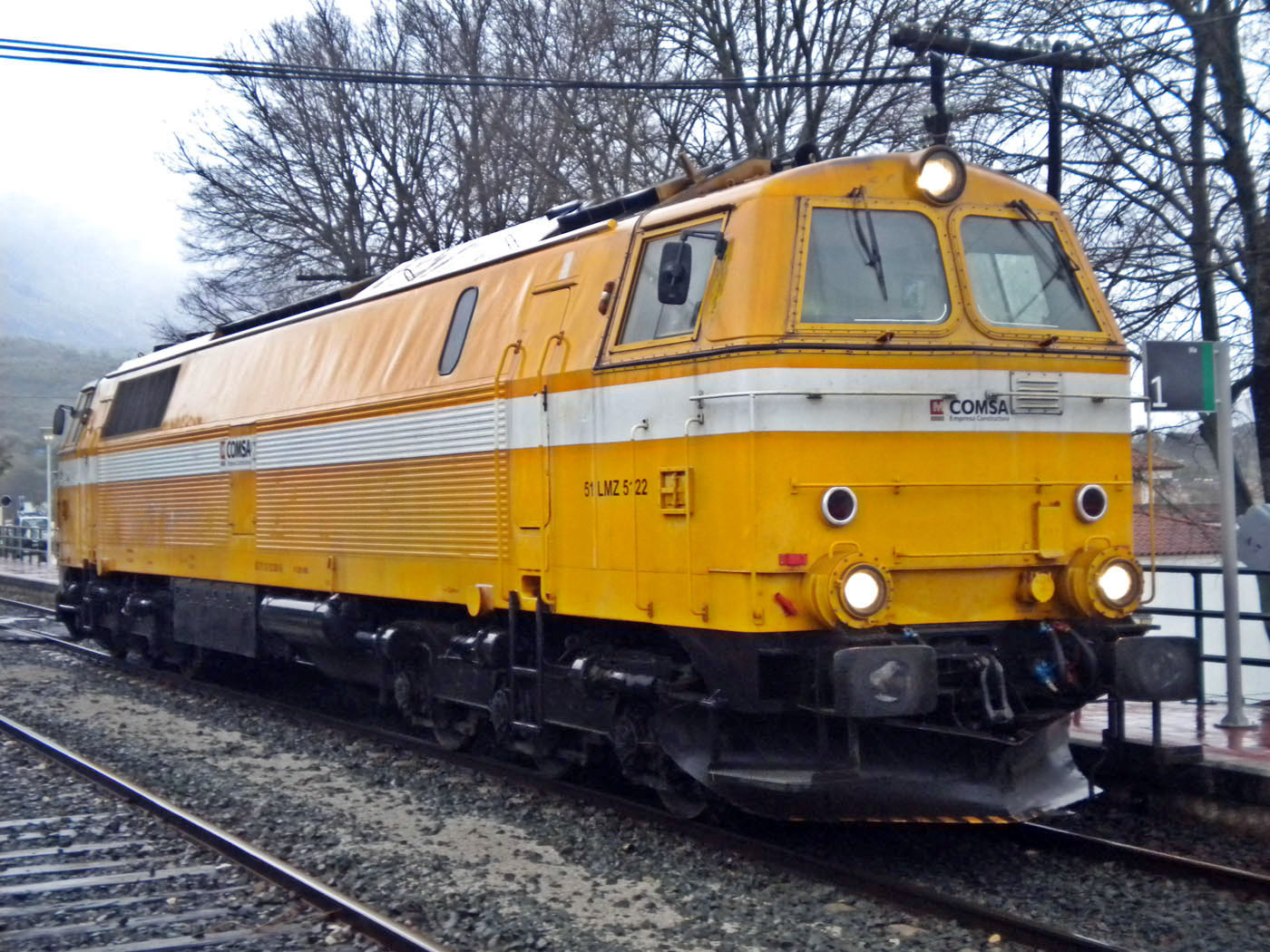
COMSA MZIII at Cortes de la Frontera, Spain (2009)

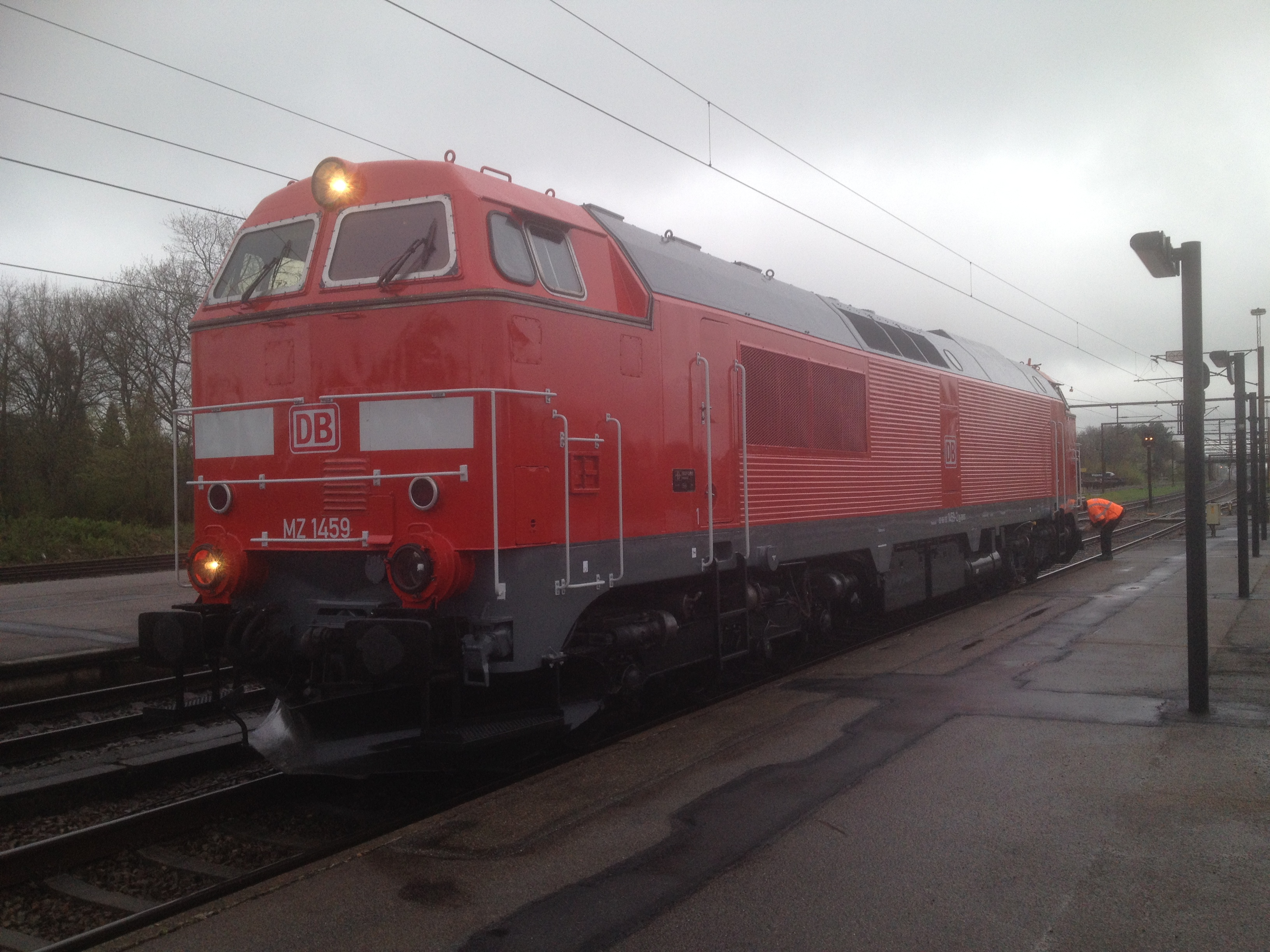
Vojens, 2018
