= New South Wales S type carriage stock =

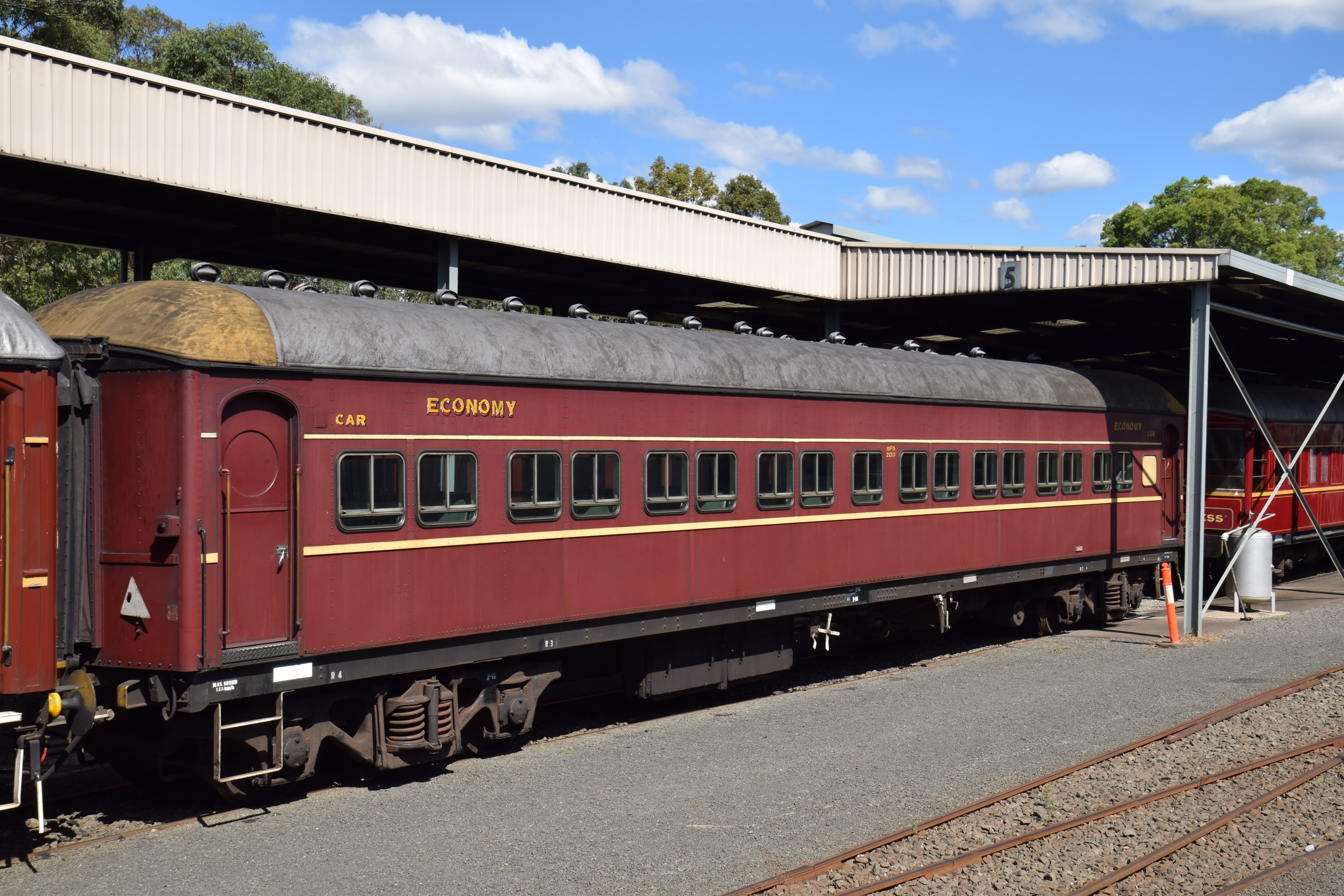
FS Class Economy Saloon No.MFS 2137 at the NSW Rail Museum, Thirlmere

The S type carriage stock was a type of steel passenger carriage operated by the New South Wales Government Railways from 1935 until 1989.

== History ==
Between 1935 and 1937, Clyde Engineering built 35 first class BS carriages with 42 seats and 86 second class FS side corridor carriages with 64 seats at its Granville factory.

Over the years, they operated on services from express passenger and mail trains to branch line services. Withdrawals commenced in the 1970s but some lasted until the late 1980s on mail trains to Dubbo, Moree and Tenterfield and Interurban services to Newcastle, Bathurst, Goulburn and Bomaderry.

During the period spanning 1974 to 1982, eight were gutted internally and fitted with suburban throw over seating and Beclawat windows for use on interurban services. These received the IFS and MFS classifications. As of June 1986, 32 remained in service with the State Rail Authority.

== Surviving S type cars ==
Number	Original code	Owner	Location	Notes
FS 2021	FS	ACT Heritage Rail Holdings	Canberra	
FS 2023	FS	ACT Heritage Rail Holdings	Canberra	
FS 2082	FS	ACT Heritage Rail Holdings	Canberra	
FS 2140	FS	ACT Heritage Rail Holdings	Canberra	
BVS 2166	IFS BSR BS	ACT Heritage Rail Holdings	Canberra	
FS 2128	FS	Cowra Caravan City	Cowra	
FS 2125	FS	Dorrigo Steam Railway & Museum	Dorrigo	
FS 2110	FS	Private	Christmas Creek, Queensland	
FS 1652	2101	Goulburn Rail Heritage Centre	Goulburn Roundhouse	
FS 1653	2102	Goulburn Rail Heritage Centre	Goulburn Roundhouse	
FS 2098	FS	Goulburn Rail Heritage Centre	Goulburn Roundhouse	
FS 2148	FS		Hay	
FS 2139	FS		Bennett Rd, Londonderry	
FS 2029	FS	Lachlan Valley Railway	Eveleigh Railway Workshops	
FS 2091	FS	Lachlan Valley Railway	Eveleigh Railway Workshops	
FS 2126	FS	5917 Syndicate	Canberra	
FS 2133	FS	Lachlan Valley Railway	Eveleigh Railway Workshops	
FS 2088	FS		Mangrove Mountain	accommodation Christian camp
FS 2129	FS		Darwin River	
BD 331	FS		Katherine	
BD 332	FS		Katherine	
FS 2016	FS	Transport Heritage NSW	NSW Rail Museum, Thirlmere	Transferred to Thirlmere on 12 October 2020.
FS 2022	FS	NSWPR	Marulan	
HFS 2084	FS		Thirlmere	Purchased by Transport Heritage NSW in the ARHS ACT Auction in 2017. Body sold for private use. Bogies, draw gear and other parts kept for spares.
FS 2124	FS	NSWPR	Marulan	
FS 2134	FS		Canberra Railway Museum	Purchased in the ARHS ACT Auction in 2017. Destroyed in fire 6-10-19
FS 2120	FS		"Krinklewood", Pokolbin	Holiday cottage
FS 1651	2100	East Coast Heritage Rail	Eveleigh Railway Workshops	
FS 2130	FS	Lachlan Valley Railway	Rothbury	
FS 2093	FS	Transport Heritage NSW	NSW Rail Museum, Thirlmere	
FS 2122	FS	Transport Heritage NSW	NSW Rail Museum, Thirlmere	
FS 1655	2104			
FS 2018	FS		Tuggeranong	
FS 2010	FS	Pilbara Railways Historical Society	Port Hedland	
FS 2138	FS	Pilbara Railways Historical Society	Port Hedland	
FS 2141	FS	Pilbara Railways Historical Society	Port Hedland	
FS 2143	FS	Pilbara Railways Historical Society	Port Hedland	
BS 2032	BS	Dorrigo Steam Railway & Museum	Dorrigo	
EBS 2076	BS	Northwest Coach Builders	NSW Rail Museum, Thirlmere	Restored by NWCB.
BS 2164	BS	Goulburn Rail Heritage Centre	Goulburn Roundhouse	
BS 2033	BS	Northwest Coach Builders	Lithgow	Stripped of spare part to restore EBS 2076 and scrapped.
BC 329	BS 2079		Adelaide River	for use as Information Centre
BC 330	BS 217		Adelaide River	for rebuild as exhibition room
BS 1684	2152	Hunter Valley Railway Trust	Rothbury	Currently under restoration at Rothbury.
GMS 1	RBS 2161 BS 2170	Northwest Coach Builders	NSW Rail Museum, Thirlmere	Converted to a lounge & observation deck carriage by NWCB.
XBS 2162	BS	Hall		Holiday cottage
XBS 2158	BS	East Coast Heritage Rail	Eveleigh Railway Workshops	Transferred to Eveleigh 5 March 2014
XFS 2015	FS	East Coast Heritage Rail (Under lease to Lachlan Valley Railway)	Eveleigh Railway Workshops	
XFS 2014	FS	Goulburn Rail Heritage Centre	Goulburn Roundhouse	
EFS 2090	FS	Transport Heritage NSW	NSW Rail Museum, Thirlmere	
BSR 2031	BS	Chumrail Pty Ltd	Rothbury	
MBR 2078	BS	East Coast Heritage Rail	Eveleigh Railway Workshops	
RBS 2153	BS	Dorrigo Steam Railway & Museum	Dorrigo	
RBS 2160	BS	5917 Syndicate	Goulburn	
HFS 2017	FS	Transport Heritage NSW	NSW Rail Museum, Thirlmere	
MFS 2028	FS	Lachlan Valley Railway	Eveleigh Railway Workshops	
MFS 2096	FS	East Coast Heritage Rail	Eveleigh Railway Workshops	
MFS 2121	FS	Lachlan Valley Railway	Eveleigh Railway Workshops	
MFS 2145	FS	East Coast Heritage Rail	Eveleigh Railway Workshops	
MFS 2137	FS	Transport Heritage NSW	NSW Rail Museum, Thirlmere	
LIV 1865	2173 BS RBS	Southern Shorthaul Railroad	Bendigo	

== Preservation ==
Many were sold to preservation organisations with East Coast Heritage Rail, Canberra Railway Museum, Lachlan Valley Railway and New South Wales Rail Transport Museum (now NSW Rail Museum) all having operational examples. Four were purchased by Hamersley Iron in Western Australia for use with their preserved British steam locomotive 4079 Pendennis Castle.

== Gallery ==
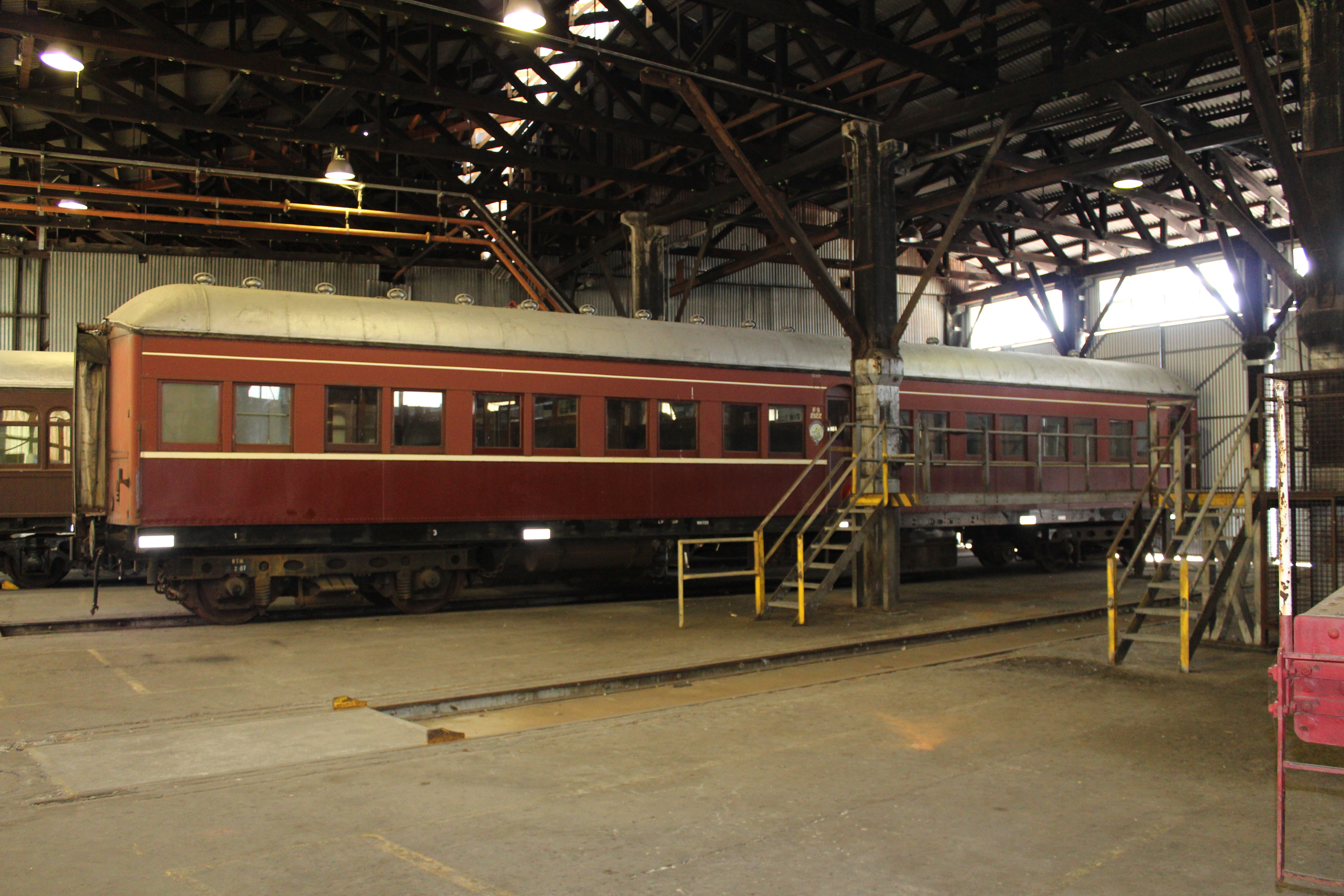
FS 2122 at Broadmeadow Locomotive Depot No 2 Roundhouse

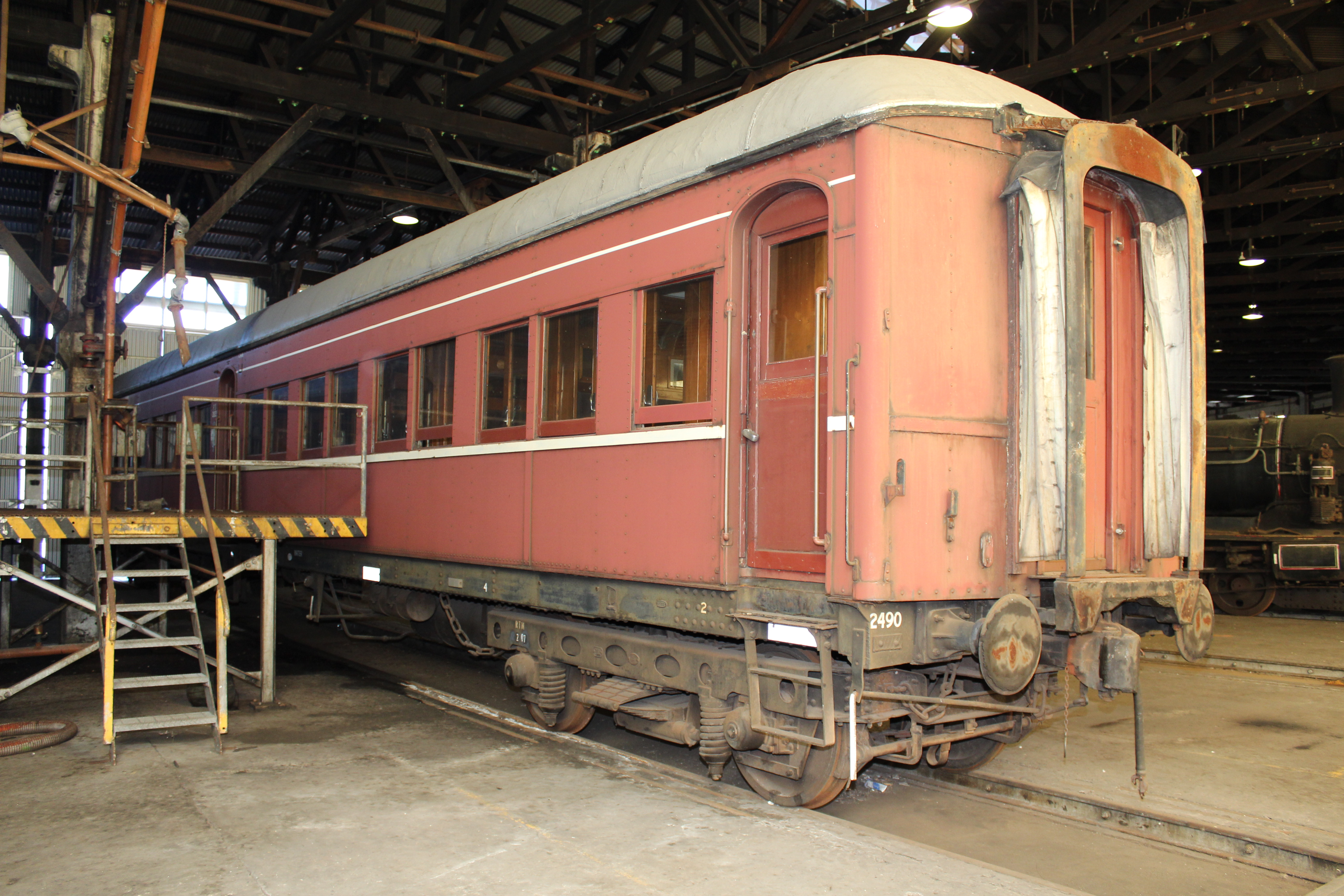
FS 2122 three quarter view

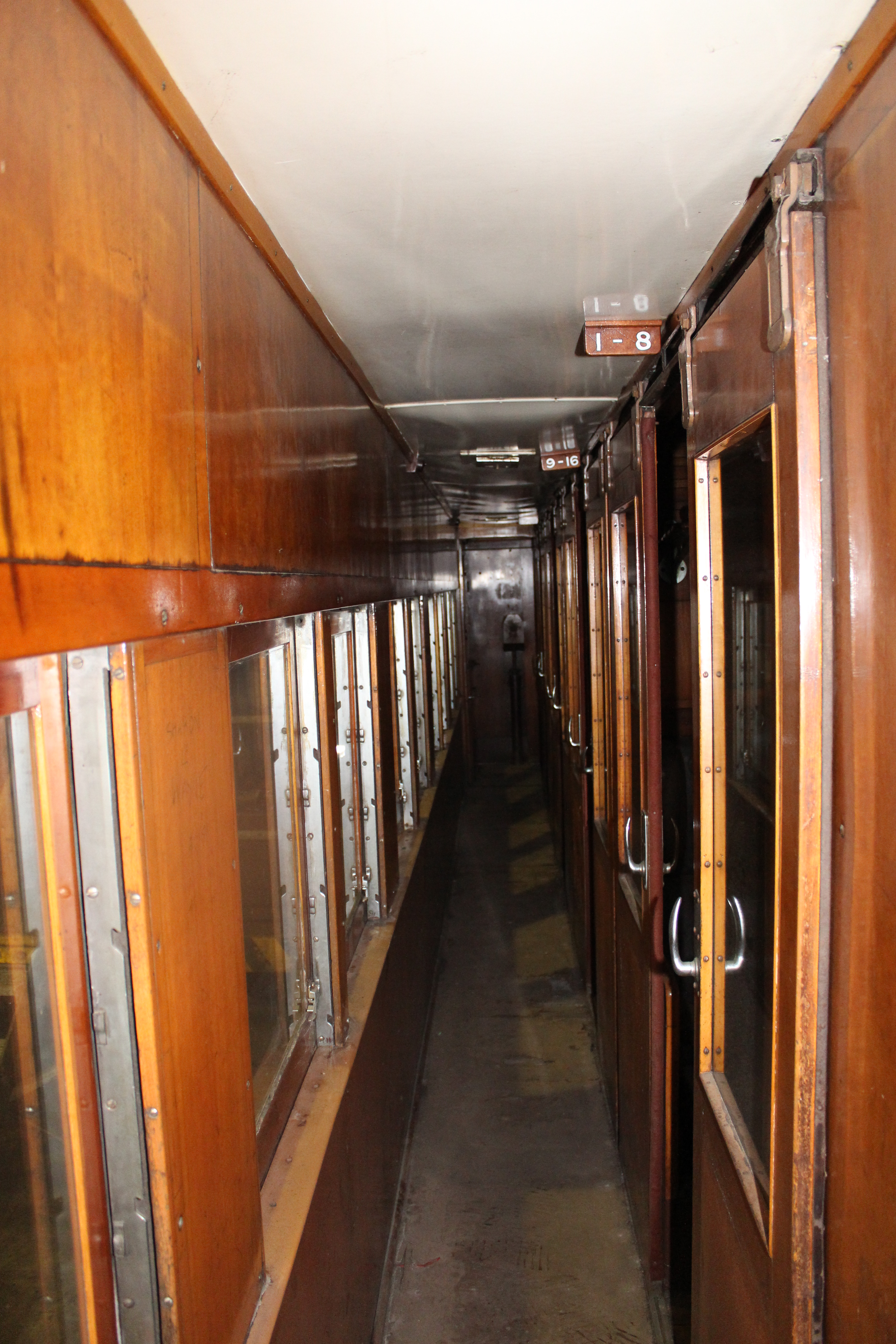
FS 2122 Corridor

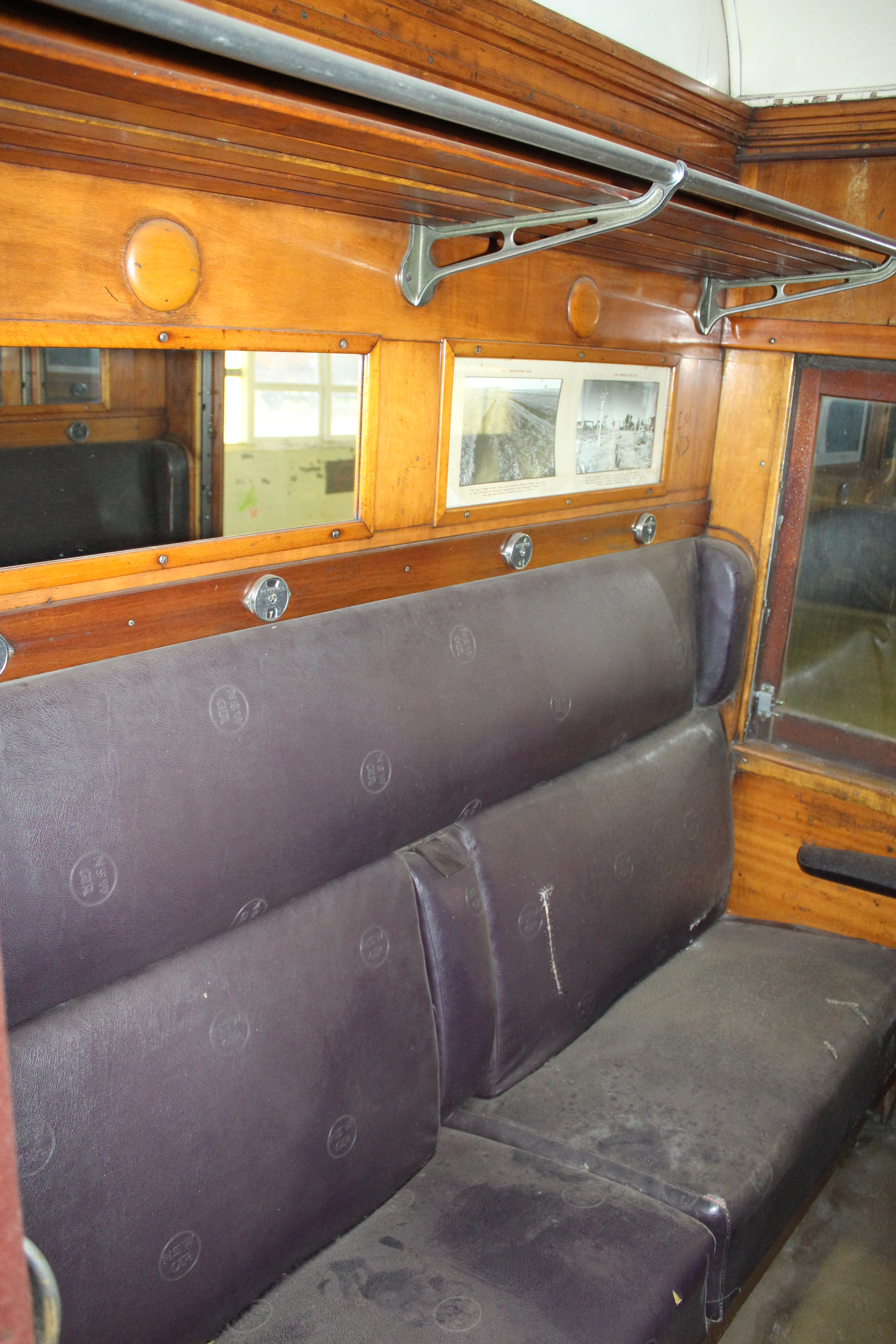
FS 2122 Compartment
