= Qube Holdings =

Australian logistics company

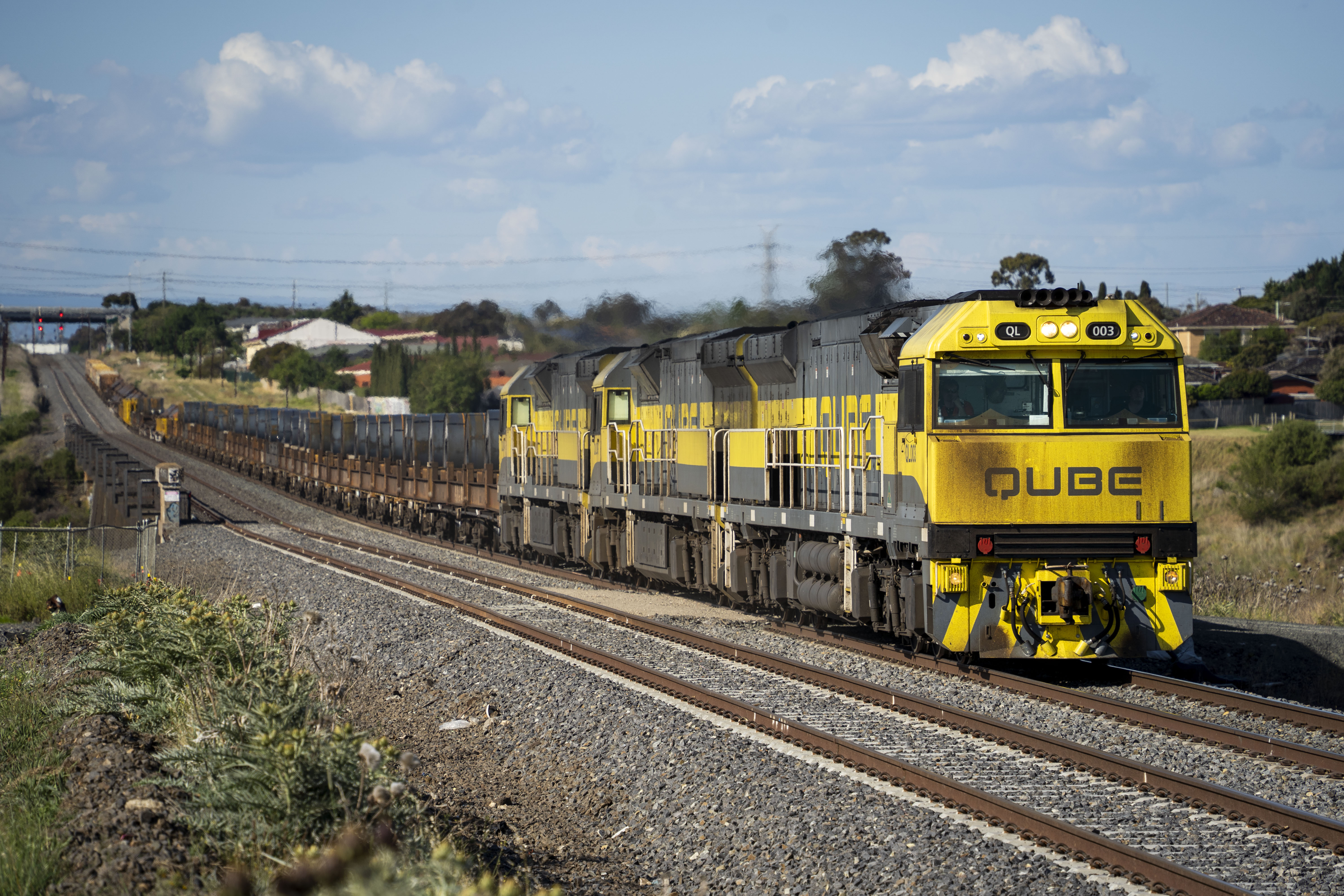
- Qube Logistics freight train passing through Sunshine North in November 2023
- Type: Subsidiary
- Traded as: ASX: QUB
- Industry: Logistics; Rail transport Stevedoring; Warehousing
- Founded: July 2006; 20 years ago
- Founder: Chris Corrigan
- Headquarters: Sydney, Australia
- Key people: Allan Davies (Chairman); Paul Digney (Managing Director)
- Revenue: $4.2 billion (2024/25)
- Net income: $377 million (2024/25)
- Number of employees: 10,000 (June 2025)
- Parent: Macquarie Asset Management
- Website: www.qube.com.au

Qube Holdings is a diversified logistics and infrastructure company in Australia. It is owned by Macquarie Asset Management

== History ==
In July 2006, following the takeover of Patrick Corporation by Toll Holdings, Chris Corrigan and some executives departed and teamed with Kaplan Funds Management to explore logistics opportunities. In January 2007, the KFM Diversified Infrastructure & Logistics Fund was listed on the Australian Securities Exchange.

In April 2007, a 75% shareholding in P&O Automotive & General Stevedoring and 50% shareholding in P&O Trans Australia were acquired from DP World.

In June 2010, the KFM Diversified Infrastructure & Logistics Fund was renamed Qube Logistics. In April 2011, Qube exercised an option to take its ownership in P&O Trans Australia up to 95%. In 2012, Qube purchased Independent Rail of Australia.

In January 2015 Qube acquired ISO limited in New Zealand.

As part of the break up of Asciano, Qube purchased a 50% stake in Patrick Corporation in August 2016.

In 2019, Qube acquired Chalmers Industries and LCR Group. In September 2021, Newcastle Agri Terminal was acquired.

In May 2023, Qube acquired Kalari Transport from Swire and a 50% stake in Pinnacle, a New Zealand owned and operated group of companies. In November 2023 Qube acquired the remaining 50% in Pinnacle along with Stevenson Logistics in North Fremantle and Agri Rail Terminal in Narrabri.

In May 2024 Qube entered into an agreement to acquire Melbourne International RoRo & Automotive Terminal from Wallenius Wilhelmsen for $333 million.

In February 2026, Qube's board of directors recommended a takeover offer from Macquarie Asset Management be accepted. The company was delisted from the Australian Securities Exchange on 8 July 2026.

== Operations ==
=== Ports and bulk ===
Qube has freight handling and stevedoring facilities at 29 ports in Australia through its subsidiaries P&O Automotive and General Stevedoring, Northern Stevedoring Services, Australian Amalgamated Terminals, PrixCar and the W Qube joint venture between Qube and Wilhelmsen Ships Service. It is also a 50% joint venture partner in Patrick Corporation.

=== Logistics ===
Qube Logistics operates road and rail services. Qube operates rail freight services in New South Wales, Victoria and South Australia. In January 2022, Qube commenced operating a contract to transport BlueScope products from its steel works at Port Kembla to Melbourne and Brisbane. It owns the Moorebank Intermodal Terminal in Sydney.

==== Locomotive fleet ====
As at October 2025, Qube owned the following locomotives:

Owned Fleet
Class	Image	Number in class	Built	Numbers	Notes
1100 class		8	2011–2012	1101–1108	New Build, 4 additional units (1109–1112) ordered but never delivered, sold to White Pass & Yukon Route.
14 class		12	1972–1974	1427–1429, 1431–1433, 1435, 1437, 1440, 1443, 1445, 1446	Ex Independent Rail of Australia.
44 class		4	1961–1967	4458, 4477, 4488, 4497	Ex Independent Rail of Australia and P&O Trans-Australia, all stored.
442 class		1	1971–1972	44202	Ex Independent Rail of Australia, stored.
80 class		3	1980–1983	8030, 8037, 8044	Ex Coote Industrial.
830 class		2	1963–1966	864, 872	Ex Greentrains #864 + 872.
G class		2	1984–1989	G521, G532	Ex SCT Logistics #521 + 532.
GML class		1	1994	GML10	Ex Comalco.
QBX class		6	2015	QBX001-QBX006	New Build.
QE class		6	2023	QE001-QE006	New Build.
QL class		20	2021–2023	QL001-QL020	New Build.
RL class		3	2005–2010	RL303, RL309, RL310	Ex P&O Trans-Australia.
Leased fleet
CF class		10	2012–2025	CF4404, CF4405, CF4406, CF4407, CF4411, CF4412, CF4420, CF4421, CF4422, CF4423	Leased from Rail First.
G class		5	1984–1989	G512, G515, G524, G526, G538	G512 and G515 leased from Rail First. G524, G526 and G538 leased from Pacific National.
MRL class		6	2013–2014	MRL001-MRL006	Least from Southern Shorthaul Railroad.
VL class		3	2007–2009	VL351, VL353, VL357	Leased from Rail First.

=== Strategic Assets ===
The Strategic Assets business is responsible for the development of expansion projects and investments. These include:

- Moorebank Intermodal Terminal
- Minto Intermodal Terminal (acquired June 2012 and included the assets of Independent Rail of Australia.
- Quattro Grain Terminal (Port Kembla)
- TQ Bulk Liquids Terminal (Port Kembla)
- AAT Facilities Management
- Newcastle Agri Terminal, acquired September 2021
