= NREC RL class locomotive =

Class of Australian diesel-electric locomotives

RL class locomotive
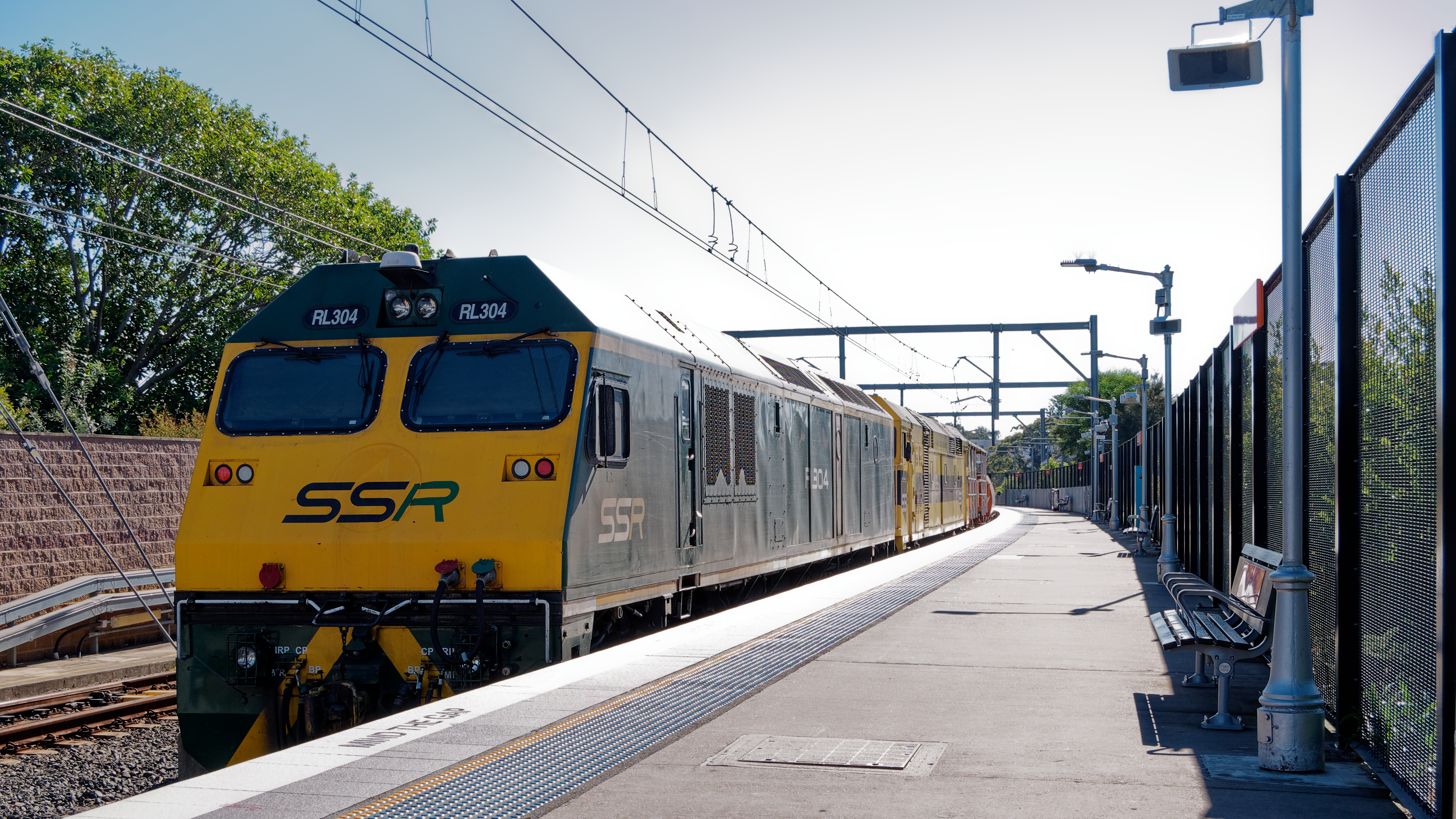
- RL304 with 44204 at Cronulla Railway Station, NSW
Type and origin
- Power type: Diesel-electric
- Builder: RTS, Islington Railway Workshops
- Model: NREC AT36-C
- Build date: 2005–2010
- Total produced: 9
Specifications
- Configuration
  - UIC: Co-Co
- Gauge: 1,435 mm (4 ft 8 1/2 in)
- Length: 19.1 m (62 ft 8 in)
- Loco weight: 132 tonnes
- Fuel type: Diesel
- Prime mover: Electro-Motive Diesel 16-645F3B
- Traction motors: General Electric GE752
- Cylinders: 16
Performance figures
- Maximum speed: 115 km/h (71 mph)
- Tractive effort: 2,500 kW (3,400 hp)
Career
- Operators: Southern Shorthaul Railroad; Qube Logistics
- Number in class: 9
- Numbers: RL301–RL307, RL309–RL310
- First run: October 2005
- Current owner: Qube Logistics; Southern Shorthaul Railroad
- Disposition: 9 in service

The RL class are a class of diesel locomotives built by Rail Technical Support Group (RTS) for the National Railway Equipment Company at Islington Railway Workshops in Australia.

== Design ==
The concept of the RL class dates back to 1994 when Morrison Knudsen Australia purchased some 442 class locomotives from the State Rail Authority with the aim of rebuilding them with EMD 16 645F3B engines. However the project was shelved and the locomotives scrapped.

Following National Railway Equipment Company purchasing Morrison Knudsen, the project was revitalised albeit using new locomotive frames. Nine were built by RTS at Islington Railway Workshops, Adelaide between 2005 and 2010 with bogies and compressors from the 442s and reconditioned parts from the United States.

Seven were originally built and initially owned by One was included in the sale of the South Spur Rail Services business to Qube Logistics in May 2010 who later took delivery of a further two. A tenth was not completed after a defect was discovered in the frame and scrapped.

They have hauled freight services in New South Wales, Victoria and South Australia. In April 2016, the six Greentrains units were sold to Southern Shorthaul Railroad.

== Status table ==
Number	Owner	Livery
RL301	Southern Shorthaul Railroad	Greentrains green & yellow
RL302	Southern Shorthaul Railroad	Greentrains green & yellow
RL303	Qube Logistics	Greentrains green & yellow
RL304	Southern Shorthaul Railroad	Southern Shorthaul Railroad "Help Us Get Home Safely"
RL305	Southern Shorthaul Railroad	Greentrains green & yellow
RL306	Southern Shorthaul Railroad	Greentrains green & yellow
RL307	Southern Shorthaul Railroad	Greentrains green & yellow
RL309	Qube Logistics	Qube Logistics silver & yellow
RL310	Qube Logistics	Qube Logistics silver & yellow
