= Newcastle Agri Terminal =

- Industry: Port operator
- Founded: 2009
- Founder: CTC Terminals
- Headquarters: Carrington, New South Wales, Australia
- Services: Bulk cargo handling
- Owner: Qube Holdings
- Website: www.naterminal.com.au

The Newcastle Agri Terminal (NAT) is an intermodal dry bulk cargo port operator located in Carrington, New South Wales. It is located within the Carrington Precinct of the Port of Newcastle utilising the Dyke 2 berth.

== Facilities ==
The terminal's facilities include two 20,000 tonne and three 6,780 tonne silos equating to 60,340 metric tonnes storage, rail receival via the Bullock Island loop line, conveyors, control rooms, carpark, laboratory, inspection and sample rooms and the ability to load Panamax vessels at 2,000 tonnes per hour. Dyke 2 berth, which can accommodate vessels up to 40,000 DWT with maximum beam of 26 metres, is owned by Newcastle Port Corporation while the bulk loader and storage facilities is owned by Aurizon.

== Ownership ==
The founding investors in NAT included Agrex, CBH Group, CTC Terminals, Glencore Xstrata and Olam Grain Australia. In August 2021, NAT was purchased by Qube Holdings from CBH Group, CTC Terminals, Riverina and Viterra.

== Operations ==
The first bulk grain shipment through the Terminal was 28,000 tonnes of durum wheat loaded onto the MV North Princess on 21 February 2014 which was sent to Algeria on behalf of the Australian Durum Company.
