= Great Northern Rail Services =

Former railway operator in Victoria, Australia

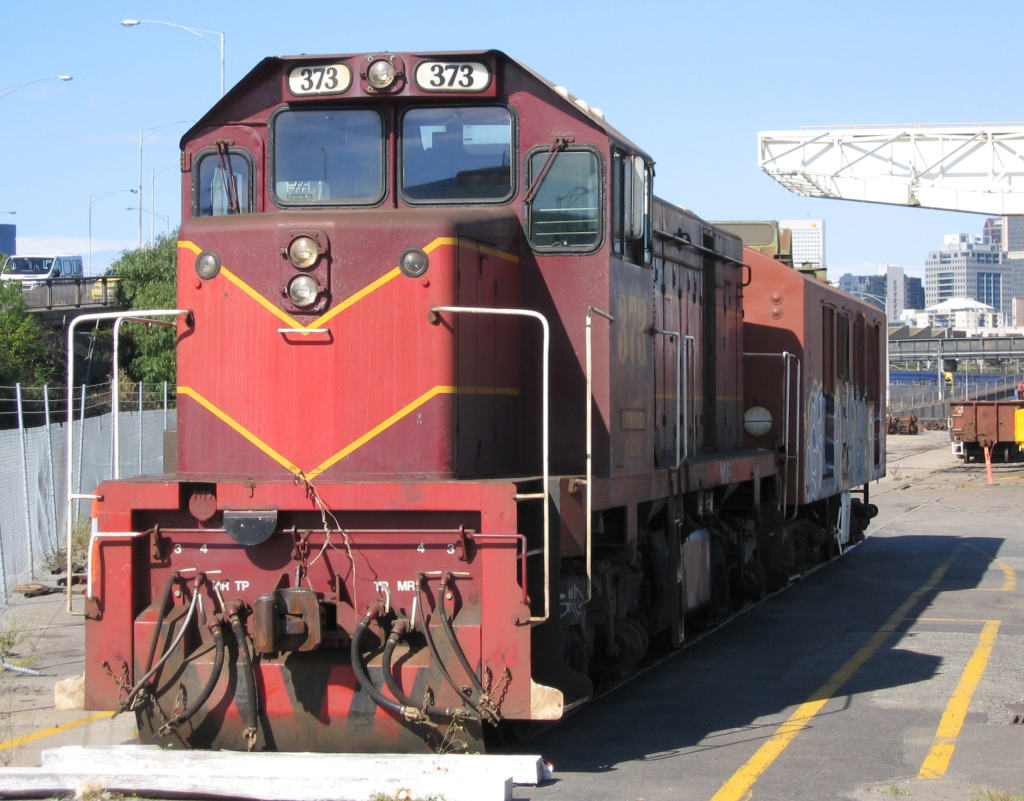
- T373 in Melbourne in September 2005
- Industry: Railway operator
- Founded: July 1993
- Defunct: December 2003
- Fate: Ceased operations
- Headquarters: Melbourne, Australia
- Area served: Victoria
- Key people: Geoff Tighe (CEO)
- Services: Personnel, maintenance, and train engine services

Great Northern Rail Services was a railway operator in Victoria, Australia. Great Northern Rail Services was incorporated in July 1993 and provided locomotives and train crews to other rail operators, ran general train operations (freight and passenger) and rail vehicle maintenance services in Victoria. The company was the first fully accredited and operational private rail operator in Victoria. The company ceased operations in November 2002 due to the increased public liability insurance costs.

== History ==
Great Northern Rail Services had its start in the leasing of locomotives, in particular to the National Rail, but later expanded into other rail and rail related areas. The main areas of operation were:

- Infrastructure maintenance (ballast spreading, rail recovery, sleeper distribution etc.)
- Maintenance of locomotives and freight wagons
- Locomotive leasing (with own crew, or pure leasing)
- General train operations (provision of locomotives, crews and crew hire)
- Hook & pull operations
- Terminal shunt and transfer
- Intermodal terminal operation

In November 1997 the company was the first private company to sign an Enterprise Agreement with the Public Transport Union - Locomotives Division and became the first private company to operate locomotives with its own crews on the Victorian rail network.

== Timeline ==
A timeline of the company:

- July 1993
  - Great Northern Rail Services incorporated
- July 1994
  - First locomotives hired to National Rail
- November 1994
  - First privately owned and operated locomotives on Public Transport Corporation network
  - Operation of the first private commercial diesel hauled train in Victoria
  - T373 and T381 converted to standard gauge for operation on the Melbourne to Adelaide standard gauge conversion project
  - Great Northern undertake in-field maintenance of the Melbourne to Adelaide ballast wagon fleet
- June 1995
  - Contract with Australian National commences for the shunt, cleaning, train examination and full servicing of The Overland in Melbourne
  - Four Westrail J class locomotives acquired, and extensive modifications undertaken for Driver Only shunt duties
- December 1997
  - The first ever track access agreement signed with VicTrack for access to the Victorian Network
- January 1998
  - First private locomotive and crew operated
- September 1998
  - Leasing of former TNT Contrans intermodal Terminal at Dynon, Melbourne
- August 1999
  - Leases Bendigo Workshops
  - Forms joint venture with John Holland to operate the Public Transport Corporation's mechanised track maintenance and track audit functions
- September 2000
  - GM22 and GM27 hired to Lachlan Valley Rail Freight to operate services in New South Wales from Cooks River Container Terminal to Sandgate, the locomotives also operating a charter to Mudgee
- November 2002
  - Public liability insurance costs force the operator to cease operations

== Fleet ==
The fleet was obtained second hand from other operators, some being overhauled and returned to service, while others were acquired for spare parts. The corporate livery consisted of burgundy with a broad red stripe along the side of the unit, dropping into a 'V' at the front of the locomotive, and a yellow pinstripe separating the colours similar by the 1950s Gulf, Mobile and Ohio Railroad scheme.

Locomotives purchased were:

- T373, T376, T377 and T381 from V/Line
- J102, J103, J104, J105 from Westrail. J104 was sold during the second half of 1996 to Rail Technical Services.
- GM10, 12, 14, 18, 19, 22, 25, 26, 27, 33, 35 and 41 from Great Southern Railroad
- S317 from the Seymour Railway Heritage Centre.
- T345 from a preservation group
- 4468, 4471, 4477, 4483, 4501, 4502, 4528 and 3532 from Rail Services Australia in mid 2000
- Y145, T372 and T386 from V/Line but scrapped

Of these locomotives, only T345, T373, T376, T377, T381, S317, GM10, GM22, GM27, J102, J103, J104, J105, 4468, 4471 and 4477 were returned to service.

== Demise ==
Great Northern ceased operating trains under their own accreditation from 20 November 2002 but continued under the control of Chicago Freight Car Leasing Australia until 2 December 2003 when a management buyout was made. The locomotives and operator accreditation of the company were acquired by Chicago Freight Car Leasing Australia who sold the operator accreditation to Southern Shorthaul Railroad. Chief executive Geoff Tighe later became business manager for El Zorro, another small rail freight operator.
