= Eugowra railway line =

Former railway line in New South Wales, Australia

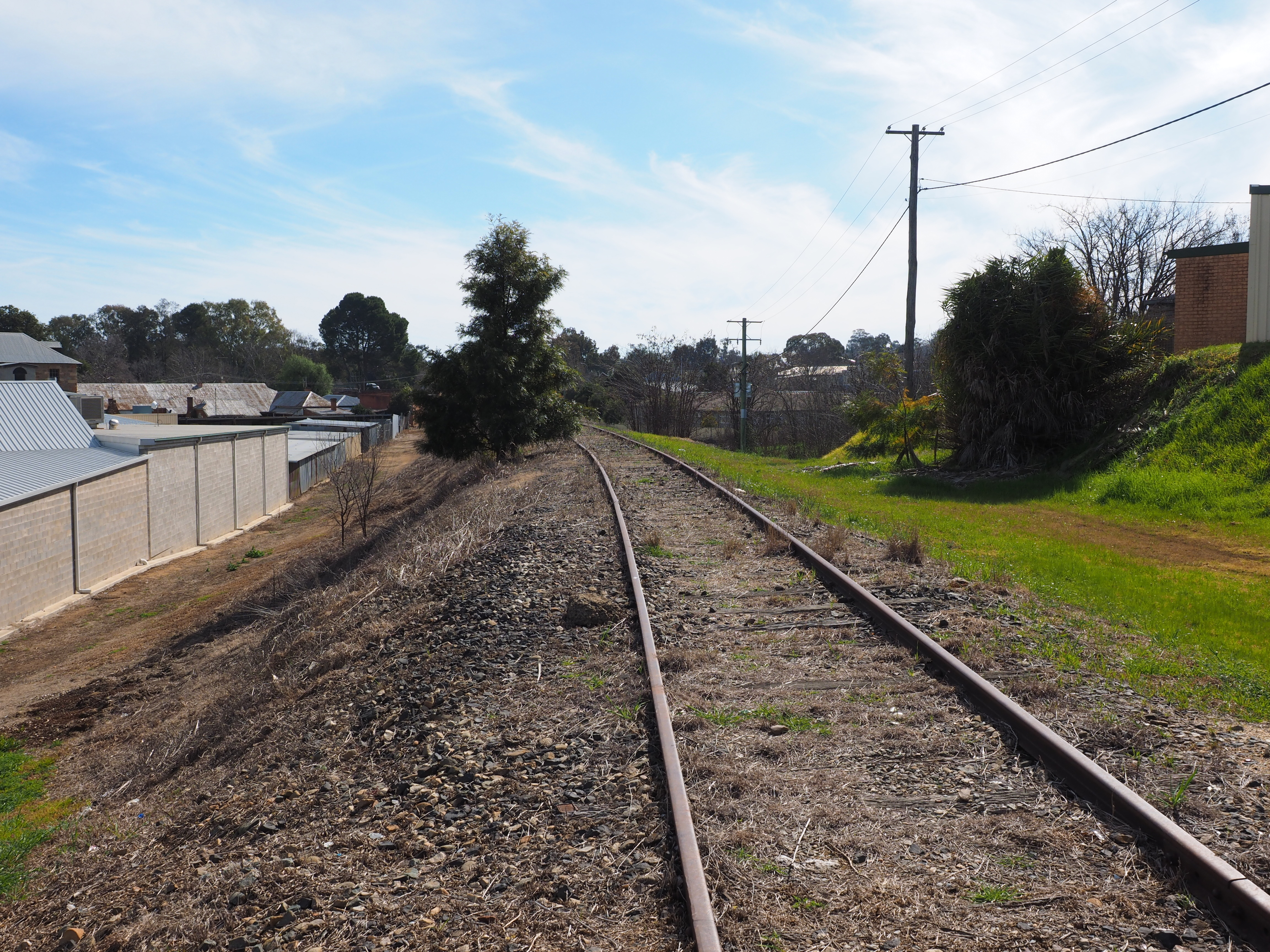
- Part of the Eugowra railway line in Cowra during 2020

Overview
- Termini: Cowra; Eugowra

History
- Opened: 1910

Technical
- Line length: 80 km (50 mi)
- Track gauge: 4 ft 8 1/2 in (1,435 mm)

The Eugowra railway line is a closed railway line in New South Wales, Australia. The 80 km (50-mile) branch line joins the Blayney–Demondrille line at Cowra.

== Construction ==
The Cowra to Canowindra Railway Act was passed on 15 December 1908. Land acquisitions proceeded rapidly, with the first sod of the new lined turned at Cowra West on 11 January 1909. John Bradfield, who went on to design the Sydney Harbour Bridge, prepared layout plans as assistant engineer on the project. The line was built to so-called "pioneer" standards – earth ballasted with no fences.

The 28 km (17 mi) branch line to Canowindra was opened with great fanfare on 4 July 1910. The opening of the line proved an economic boon to the town, with Canowindra's population increasing from 400 prior to 1900, to 1500 and rising in 1911.

An extension to Eugowra was opened on 11 December 1922. Further extensions to link up with the Main Western Line, one at Gregra and another at Parkes, were approved in 1924, but never built.

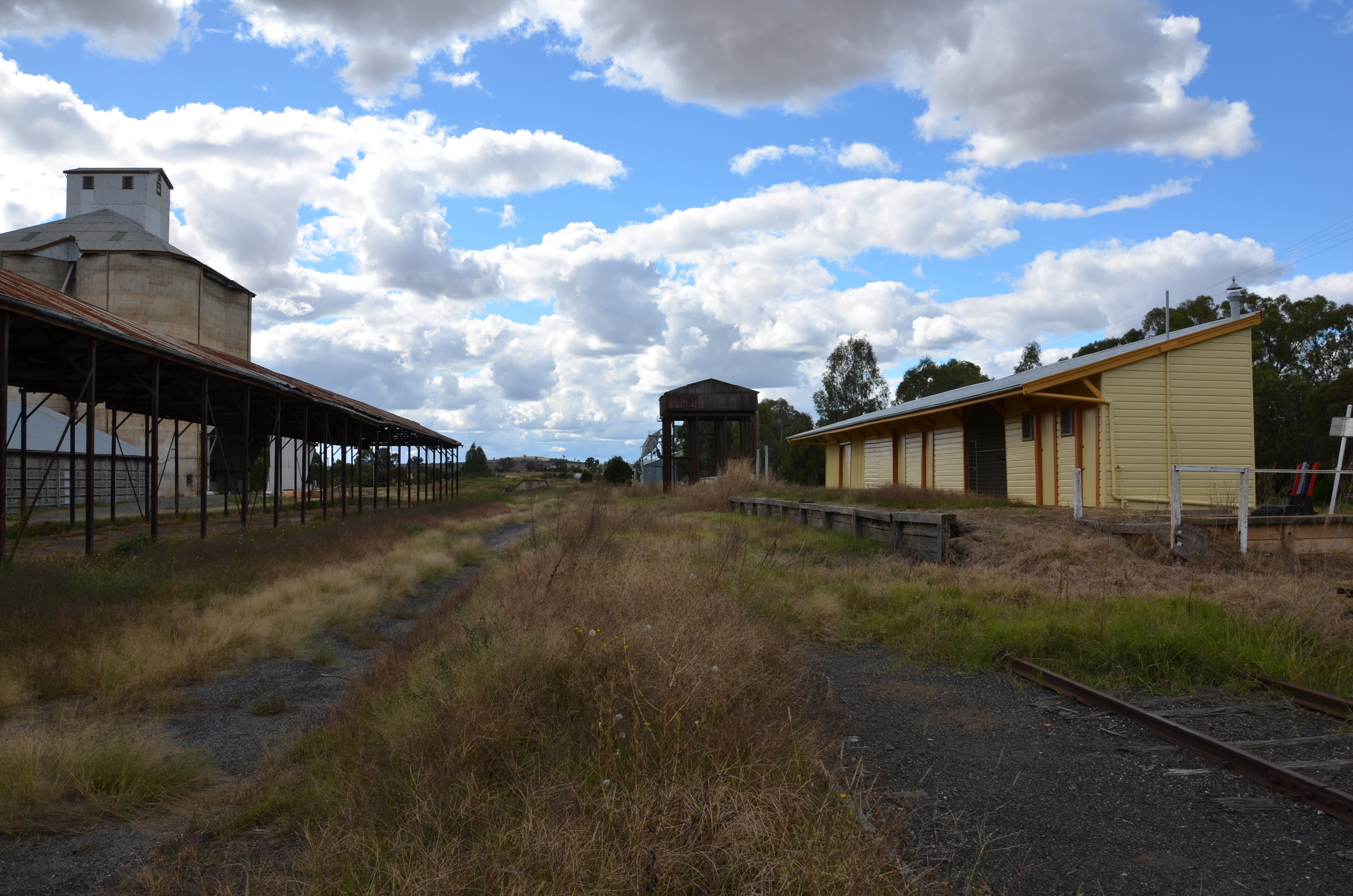
Canowindra Station, the site of the original railhead, has been abandoned since 2001

== Freight and passenger services ==
Due to the relative shortness of the branch, the main use of the line was for grain haulage rather than passengers.

In 1927, a rail-motor coach replaced steam locomotives for passenger transport. The "Tin Hare", as the coach was affectionately known, provided a daily return service on weekdays between Cowra and Eugowra. With improving road transport links, demand for passenger services on the line gradually decreased. In the years leading up to the service's cessation on 10 August 1974, the few passengers that used the service had been carried in the brake carriage of the regular grain service.

Freight services continued into the 1990s. A washout near Eugowra in 1991 resulted in the line being truncated at Trajere. The entire line was closed by the end of the year. The Lachlan Valley Railway operated a tourist railway on the line from 1994. Floods in 2001 damaged a bridge at Cucumber Creek, closing the line permanently. As of 2014, there are no plans to reopen the branch.
