= BHP Port Kembla D9 class =

Class of Australian diesel locomotives

Type and origin
- Power type: Diesel-electric
- Builder: English Electric, Rocklea
- Build date: 1956-60
- Total produced: 13
Specifications
- Configuration
  - UIC: B-B
- Gauge: 1,435 mm (4 ft 8 1/2 in) standard gauge
- Wheel diameter: 3 ft 8 in (1,118 mm)
- Minimum curve: 150 ft (45.72 m)
- Wheelbase: 28 ft 3 in (8.61 m) total, 7 ft 3 in (2.210 m) bogie
- Length: 38 ft 1 in (11.61 m) over couplers
- Width: 9 ft 3 in (2,819 mm)
- Height: 13 ft 10 1/2 in (4,229 mm)
- Axle load: 15 long tons (15.2 t; 16.8 short tons)
- Loco weight: 60 long tons (61.0 t; 67.2 short tons)
- Fuel type: Diesel
- Fuel capacity: 500 imp gal (2,300 L; 600 US gal)
- Prime mover: English Electric 6KT
- RPM range: 330 - 680rpm
- Engine type: four stroke, 6 Inline two valves per cylinder
- Aspiration: Natural
- Traction motors: Two EE506
- Cylinders: 6
- Cylinder size: 10 in × 12 in (254 mm × 305 mm)
- Loco brake: Air
- Train brakes: Air
Performance figures
- Maximum speed: 17 1/2 mph (28.2 km/h)
- Power output: 400 hp (300 kW) gross
- Tractive effort: 17,800 lbf (79.2 kN) at 2.9 mph (0 km/h)
Career
- Operators: Australian Iron & Steel
- Number in class: 13
- Numbers: D9-D15, D20-D25
- First run: August 1956
- Preserved: D9, D11, D20, D21, D23, D25
- Disposition: 6 preserved, 7 scrapped

The D9 class were a class of diesel locomotives built by English Electric, Rocklea for Australian Iron & Steel's, Port Kembla steelworks between 1956 and 1960.

== History ==
In the 1950s, Australian Iron & Steel commenced an extensive modernisation and expansion of its Port Kembla steelworks. To operate on the expanded 200 kilometre network, seven shunter locomotives were ordered from English Electric with the first entering service in September 1956. A further six were delivered in 1960. A distinct feature of the locomotives was a large cooling fan at the end of the hood.

A down turn in the early 1980s saw the class withdrawn, with D10 being hired to fellow BHP subsidiary Blue Circle Cement for use at Portland in 1982/83 and Berrima in 1986/87. In 1989 three locos, D21, D23 & D24 were overhauled & repainted in the Lysaghts yellow colour scheme to replace locomotives on the neighbouring John Lysaght plant.

Six have been preserved:

- D9 by the Lachlan Valley Railway, Cowra
- D11 by the Dorrigo Steam Railway & Museum
- D20, D21 and D23 by the Lithgow State Mine Heritage Park & Railway
- D25 by the Canberra Railway Museum
