= Port Botany (seaport) =

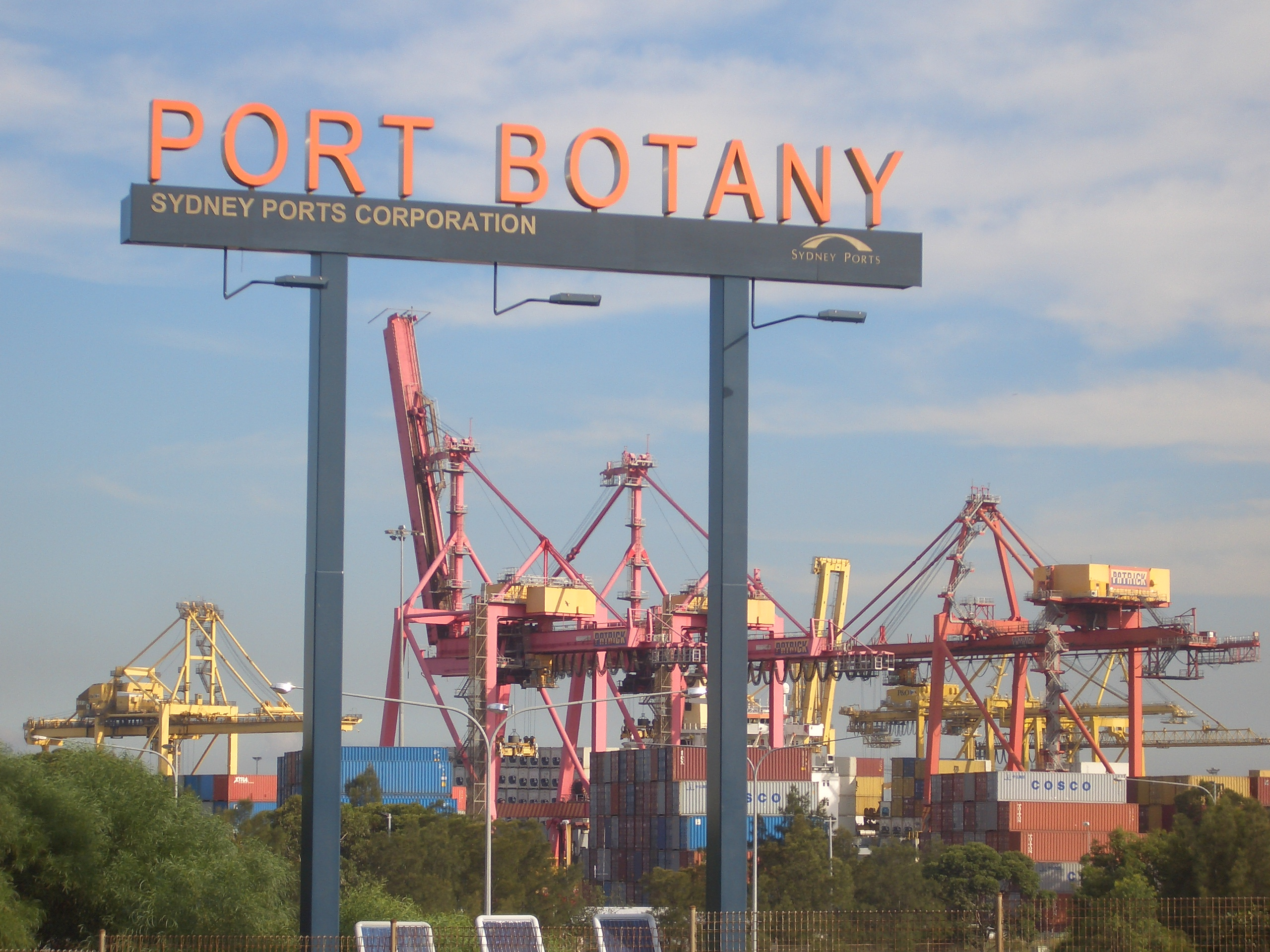
- The entrance to Port Botany, overlooking Brotherson Dock Number One
- Interactive map of Port Botany

Location
- Country: Australia
- Location: Sydney, New South Wales
- Coordinates: 33.970°S 151.215°E
- UN/LOCODE: AUPBT

Details
- Opened: April 1979
- Owned by: NSW Ports
- No. of berths: 17
- Draft depth: 19.0 m.
- Chairman, NSW Ports: Paul McClintock
- Chief Executive Officer: Marika Calfas

Statistics
- Vessel arrivals: 6,000 (2024)
- Annual container volume: 2.8 million TEUs
- Website www.nswports.com.au

Port Botany is a deepwater seaport located in Botany Bay in Sydney, Australia. The port is dominated by trade in containerised manufactured products and, to a lesser extent, bulk liquid imports including petroleum and natural gas. It is one of Australia's largest container ports and is administered by NSW Ports which entered into a 99-year lease agreement with the Port Authority of New South Wales in May 2013.

== History ==
Prior to 1960 Sydney's international shipping facilities were exclusively located in Port Jackson, with bulk and break bulk docks at Darling Harbour and Walsh Bay with bulk and roll-on/roll-off docks at Glebe Island and White Bay.

With the advent of containerisation in the late 1950s it became clear that Sydney would require additional port facilities to cater for new cargo types. In the 1960s the government agency responsible for ports, the Maritime Services Board, recommended that a new port complex be developed in the northern part of Botany Bay adjacent to Sydney Airport. The Government of New South Wales endorsed the proposal in 1969 and in 1971 an Atkinson International / Leighton Holdings joint venture commenced work on two container terminals to the north, and a bulk liquid wharf and storage area to the south..

=== Bulk liquids ===
The bulk liquid terminal was completed in 1979 as a common-user facility for the import of natural gas, oil, petroleum and chemicals. The terminal and storage area were progressively expanded during the 1980s including new ethylene tanks and handling plant operated by ICI, and AGL storage caverns in 1994 and 2000. The bulk liquid terminal can accommodate ships of around 230 metres (750 ft) in length and 90,000 tonnes (89,000 long tons; 99,000 short tons).

=== Containers ===
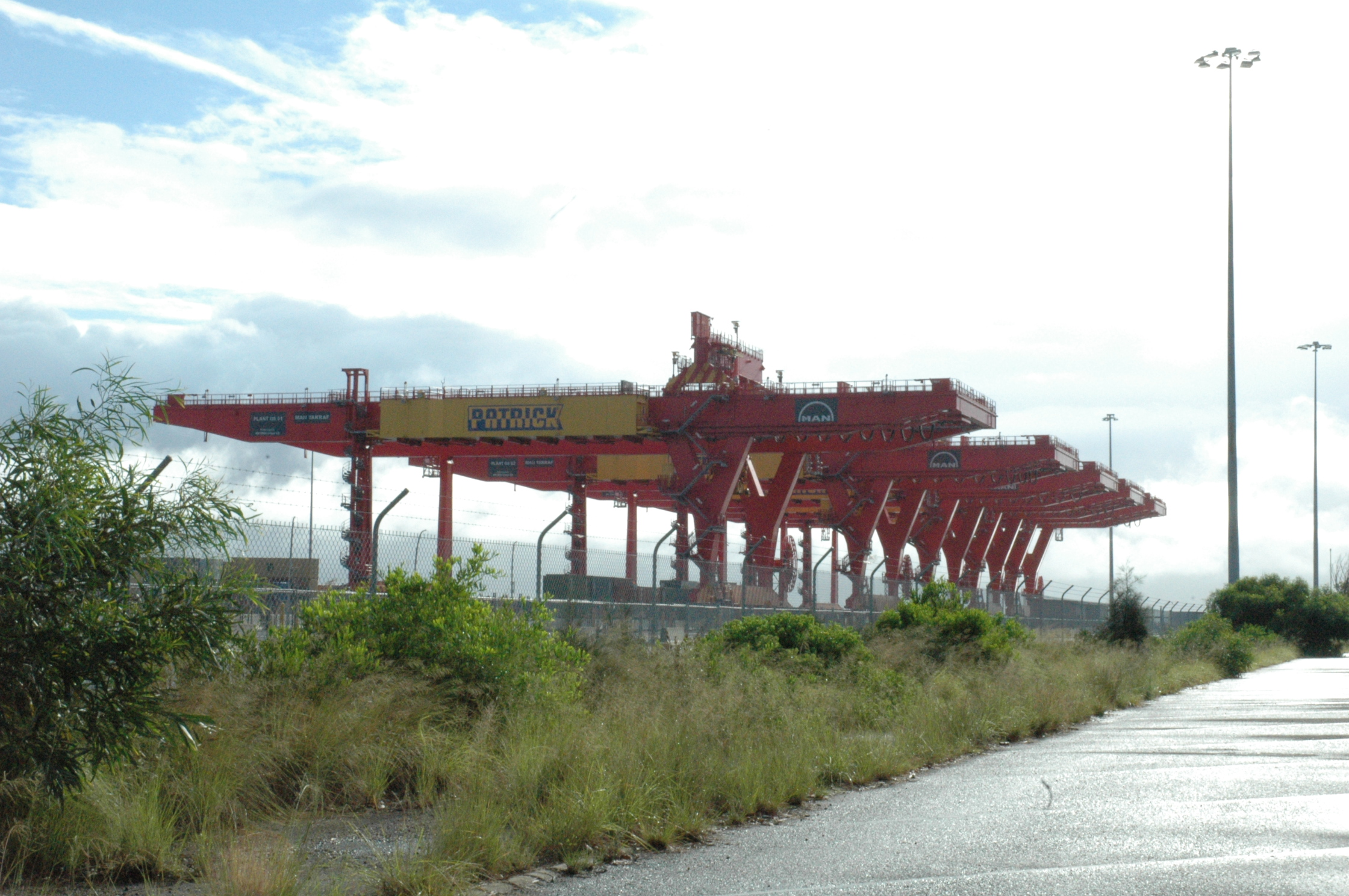
Intermodal container lifting container crane belonging to Patrick Corporation at Port Botany

The northernmost container terminal was completed in 1979 and officially opened by Premier Neville Wran who christened it Brotherson Dock in memory of former Maritime Services Board chairman Bill Brotherson who had died in 1975. The terminal was initially leased to Australian shipping company ANL but was transferred to Patrick Corporation in the 1990s. In 2006 Patrick Corporation merged with Toll Holdings.

The southern container terminal opened in 1982, christened Brotherson Dock Two and was leased to the newly formed stevedore company Container Terminals Australia (CTAL). Despite both terminals being of equal size and quay length, Brotherson Dock Two struggled to compete with its northern neighbour. In its first full year of operation, Brotherson Two handled just 91,000 containers with a berth occupancy rate of 40 percent. In the 1990s CTAL ceased operations and the terminal lease was onsold to shipping company P&O. In 2006 P&O was purchased by Dubai Ports.

== Port expansion ==
The third container terminal at Port Botany was completed in June 2011. The A$515 million project included the reclamation of 63 hectares (160 acres) of land with the construction of 1.85 kilometres (1.15 mi) of shipping wharves which will berth five vessels. In addition, there were associated rail and road networks. Baulderstone and Jan De Nul, the project's joint venture partners, were awarded the Australian Construction Achievement Award, the Australian construction industry's most prestigious award, for their work on the project. In December 2009, Hutchison Whampoa invested in Terminal 3 through subsidiary Hutchison Port Holdings (and its wholly owned subsidiary Sydney International Container Terminals), and signed a 30-year lease with Sydney Ports Corporation, now transferred to NSW Ports. The terminal was expected to be operational during 2013.

The expansion catered for continued growth in demand for imports by intermodal containers and to provide space for a third stevedore for Sydney. The expansion was twice the size recommended by an independent Commission of Inquiry in 2004. The commission's recommendation proposed that increased demand could be catered for by the two existing stevedores via improvements in technology and logistics. The concentration of NSW's container trade at Port Botany will see a tripling of containers being processed, and although there are plans to double the current percentage of containers being transported by freight rail from 20% to 40%, there will still be a 200% increase in container trucks on Sydney's roads.

An A$84 million expansion to the Bulk Liquids Berth, called BLB2, commenced and doubled the capacity of bulk liquids operations. The BLB2, which became operational in mid-2013, is suitable for ships up to 270 metres (890 ft) in length and 120,000 tonnes (120,000 long tons; 130,000 short tons).
