= Heywood railway station, Victoria =

Former railway station in Victoria, Australia

Heywood

General information
- Location: Victoria; Australia
- Coordinates: 38°08′04″S 141°37′48″E
- Line: Portland
- Distance: 378.785 km
- Platforms: 1
- Tracks: 1

Other information
- Status: Closed
- Station code: HWD

History
- Opened: 19 Dec 1877
- Closed: 1981

Services
Preceding station	Disused railways	Following station
Hamilton	Portland line	Portland
	List of closed railway stations in Victoria	
Location
- Location within Victoria

Heywood railway station is a disused station on the Portland railway line in the town of Heywood, in the state of Victoria, Australia. The last passenger train between Ararat and Portland was on 12 September 1981, operated by a DRC railcar. The platform and station building are still in place at Heywood, although in a disused condition. Some of the former yard remains as unconnected broad gauge track, with power connections also provided to a work camp area. The former goods shed was removed by October 1983, and the through line was converted to standard gauge in 1995.

A line known as the Mount Gambier-Heywood railway line was opened between Heywood and Mount Gambier in 1917. Service was suspended on 11 April 1995, due to the standardisation of the Maroona – Portland line and is pending for standard gauge conversion.
