= Natimuk railway station =

Former railway station in Horsham Rural City, Victoria, Australia

Natimuk

General information
- Location: Australia
- Coordinates: 36°44′39.9″S 141°56′26.3″E
- Owner: VicTrack
- Line: Carpolac

Other information
- Status: Demolished

History
- Opened: 1894
- Closed: 1986

Services
Preceding station	Disused railways	Following station
East Natimuk	Carpolac line	Arapiles
	List of closed railway stations in Victoria	
Location

Natimuk railway station was a railway station located in Natimuk on the Carpolac railway line. It was opened in 1894 when the line was extended from East Natimuk to Goroke and officially closed in 1986, although the last train had run in February. Today, all that remains at the site of the station are the grain silos and some sleepers.
