= Hamilton railway station, Victoria =

Former railway station in Victoria, Australia

Coordinates: 37.74632°S 142.028729°E

Hamilton
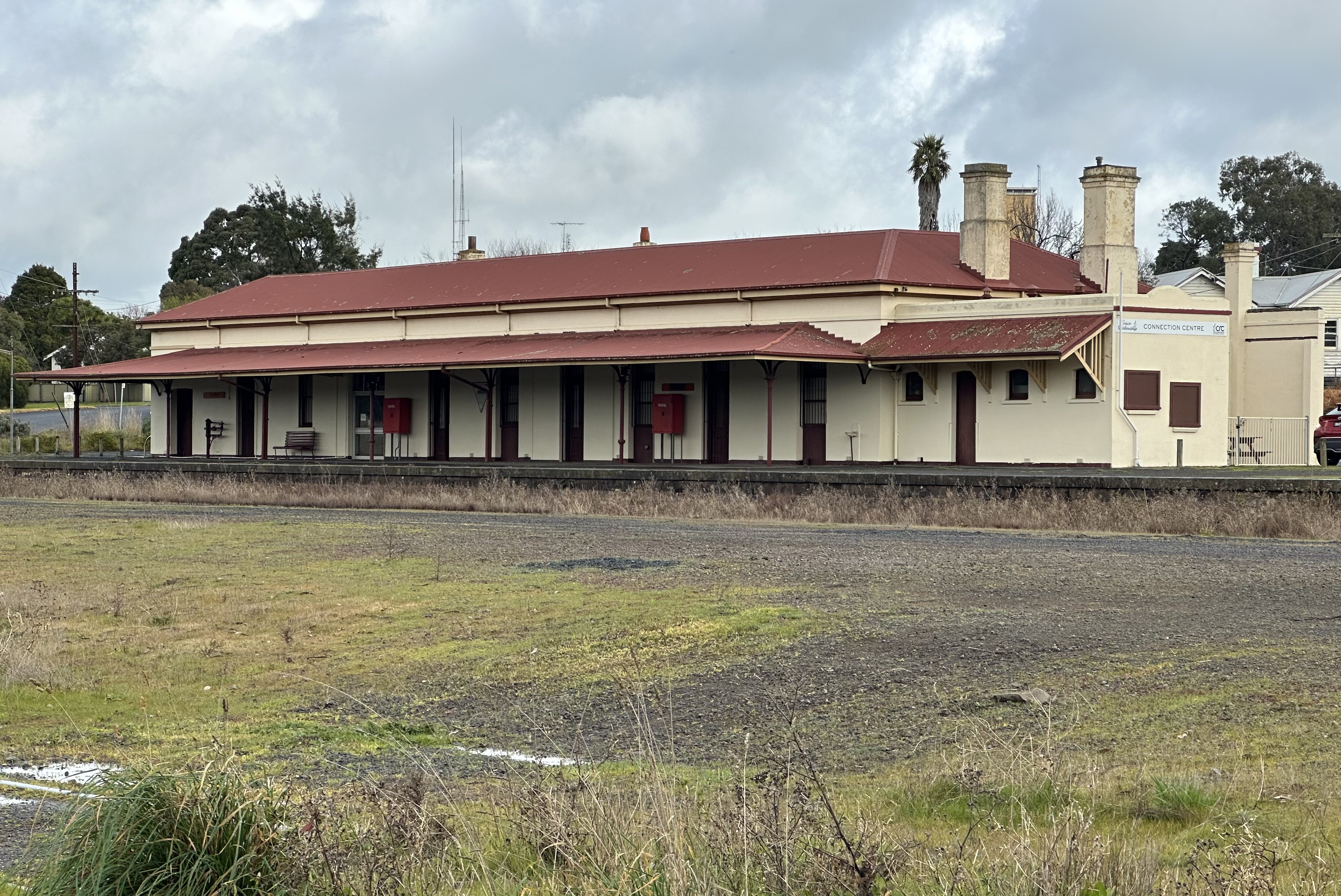
- Hamilton station building in August 2026

General information
- Line: Portland
- Platforms: 1
- Tracks: 1

Other information
- Status: Closed

History
- Opened: 29 October 1877
- Closed: 1981

Services
Preceding station	Disused railways	Following station
Maroona	Portland line	Heywood
Junction	Balmoral line	Towards Balmoral
Junction	Coleraine line	Towards Coleraine
Junction	Penshurst line	Towards Penshurst and Koroit
	List of closed railway stations in Victoria	
Location

Hamilton is a disused railway station located on the Ararat - Portland railway in the city of Hamilton, Victoria, Australia. Today the station is now used only for through trains, and the large station building is used only to serve bus passengers, although the disused platform remains in reasonable condition.

== History ==
The railway to Hamilton opened in October 1877, in December that year the line was extended south to the final terminus of Portland. Hamilton became a major railway station with extensive freight facilities and was the junction for several branch lines:

- To Coleraine opened in 1888.
- To Penshurst and Koroit in 1890.
- To Cavendish in 1915, extended to Balmoral in 1920.

The first two branch lines left the main line at Coleraine Junction, located a short distance south of Hamilton station itself.

By 1934 the station had a main platform facing the main line, opposite a crossing loop, and a dock platform at each end of the main platform. The goods yard had six roads opposite the platform, servicing a goods shed and stock yards. At the down end of the platform was a number of additional sidings, along with a turntable. A signal box and auxiliary frame controlled the signals in the area. By 1958 the yard had been expanded to 10 roads with a larger goods shed, a weighbridge also being provided.

Rationalisation of the station began in 1967 where the signal box was removed; the branch lines to Coleraine and Koroit were closed in 1977, the branch to Balmoral following suit in 1979. The last passenger train between Ararat and Portland was on 12 September 1981, operated by a DRC railcar.

In 1987 a large number of sidings were removed including the carriage docks, in 1988 all signals were removed leaving a minimum of sidings in the yard. The line from Maroona to Portland was closed for conversion from broad to standard gauge in March 1995, being reopened to traffic two months later. Today the station has a platform facing the main line, with two goods sidings opposite the platform.

In March 2010 the State Government announced a $3.97 million grant for the construction of a rail loading facility alongside the Iluka Resources mineral sand separation plant (some distance south of the railway station) for the transport of heavy mineral concentrate extracted from the Iluka mine site at Ouyen and transported via the standard gauge Murtoa - Hopetoun railway. The facility may also be used by the existing El Zorro service carrying containerised processed mineral sands from Portland to Melbourne.

A Victorian Railways K class steam locomotive is plinthed in a nearby park: it is made up of K177's frames and coupled wheels, K174's pony truck and boiler, and K159's tender.
