= Balmoral railway line =

Former railway line, Victoria, Australia

Balmoral

Overview
- Other name: Hamilton-East Natimuk Hamilton-Horsham Horsham-Hamilton East Natimuk-Hamilton
- Status: closed
- Owner: VicTrack
- Termini: East Natimuk; Hamilton
- Connecting lines: Carpolac Portland
- Stations: 15

History
- Opened: 1887
- Closed: in stages from 1951, fully closed by 1988

The Balmoral railway line was a railway line branching off of the Carpolac railway line at East Natimuk in Victoria, Australia.

The line was opened in stages beginning from East Natimuk to Noradjuha in 1887 and reaching Balmoral in 1919 with a link being constructed from Hamilton in stages beginning with Hamilton to Cavendish in 1915 and finally reaching Balmoral in 1920.

== History ==
The line was opened to connect the city (then town) of Horsham with the town of Hamilton. It was opened in stages from East Natimuk to Noradjuha on 25 August 1887, Noradjuha to Toolondo on 24 September 1912, Hamilton to Cavendish on 1 November 1915, Toolondo to Kanagulk on 17 December 1917, Kanagulk to Balmoral on 16 June 1919 and finally Cavendish to Balmoral on 19 November 1920.

The passenger service between Horsham and Balmoral survived until August 1951 and Hamilton to Balmoral until March 1955. The line from Noradjuha to Hamilton was closed in July 1979 and the East Natimuk to Noradjuha line officially closed in 1986 however had not seen services in a number of years. The Horsham to East Natimuk line remained until 1988 when it was also closed.

== Line guide ==
Branched from the Carpolac railway line at East Natimuk station

Noradjuha

Jallumba

Toolondo

Jeffries

Kanagulk

Balmoral

Englefield

Vasey

Gatum

Urangara

Cavendish

Kyup

Kanawalla

Branched from the Portland railway line at Hamilton station
