= Coleraine railway line =

Former railway line in Victoria, Australia

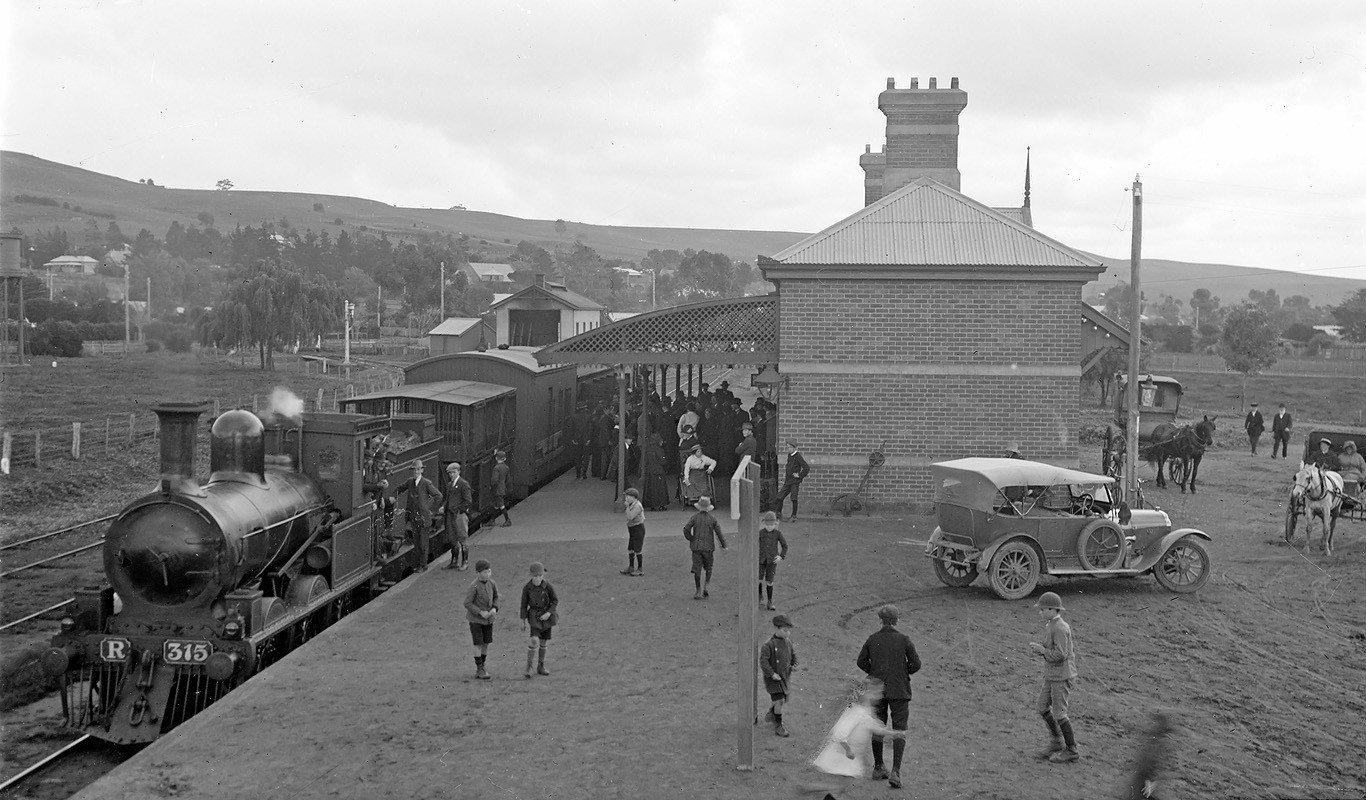
- Train at Coleraine station circa 1915

Overview
- Other name: Hamilton-Coleraine
- Status: Closed
- Owner: VicTrack
- Termini: Coleraine Junction; Coleraine
- Connecting lines: Portland
- Stations: 5

History
- Opened: 20 November 1888
- Closed: 12 September 1977

Technical
- Line length: 37 km (23 mi)

The Coleraine railway line was a railway line branching off of the Portland railway line at Coleraine Junction station. It was opened on 20 November 1888, and was officially closed on 12 September 1977. It is now a Rail trail.

== Line Guide ==
Branched from Portland railway line at Coleraine Junction station

Bocharra

Wannon

Parkwood (originally named Gritjurk)

Coleraine
