= Carpolac railway station =

Former railway station in Australia

Coordinates: 36°44′12.2″S 141°19′00.9″E

Carpolac

General information
- Location: Australia
- Owner: VicTrack
- Line: Carpolac

Other information
- Status: Demolished

History
- Opened: 1927
- Closed: 8 December 1986

Services
Preceding station	Disused railways	Following station
Mortat	Carpolac line	Terminus
	List of closed railway stations in Victoria	
Location

Carpolac railway station was a railway station the terminus of the Carpolac railway line. It was opened in 1927 when the line was extended from Goroke to Carpolac. There was never a passenger platform at Carploac however there were grain trains operating out to Carpolac. By 1989 only the freight shed remained with all track removed and by 2002 all that remained were the grain silos. The station closed on 8 December 1986 giving it a lifespan of just 59 years.
