= Seymour Railway Heritage Centre =

Railway museum in Victoria, Australia

Coordinates: 37°1′22″S 145°8′34″E

Seymour Railway Heritage Centre (SRHC)
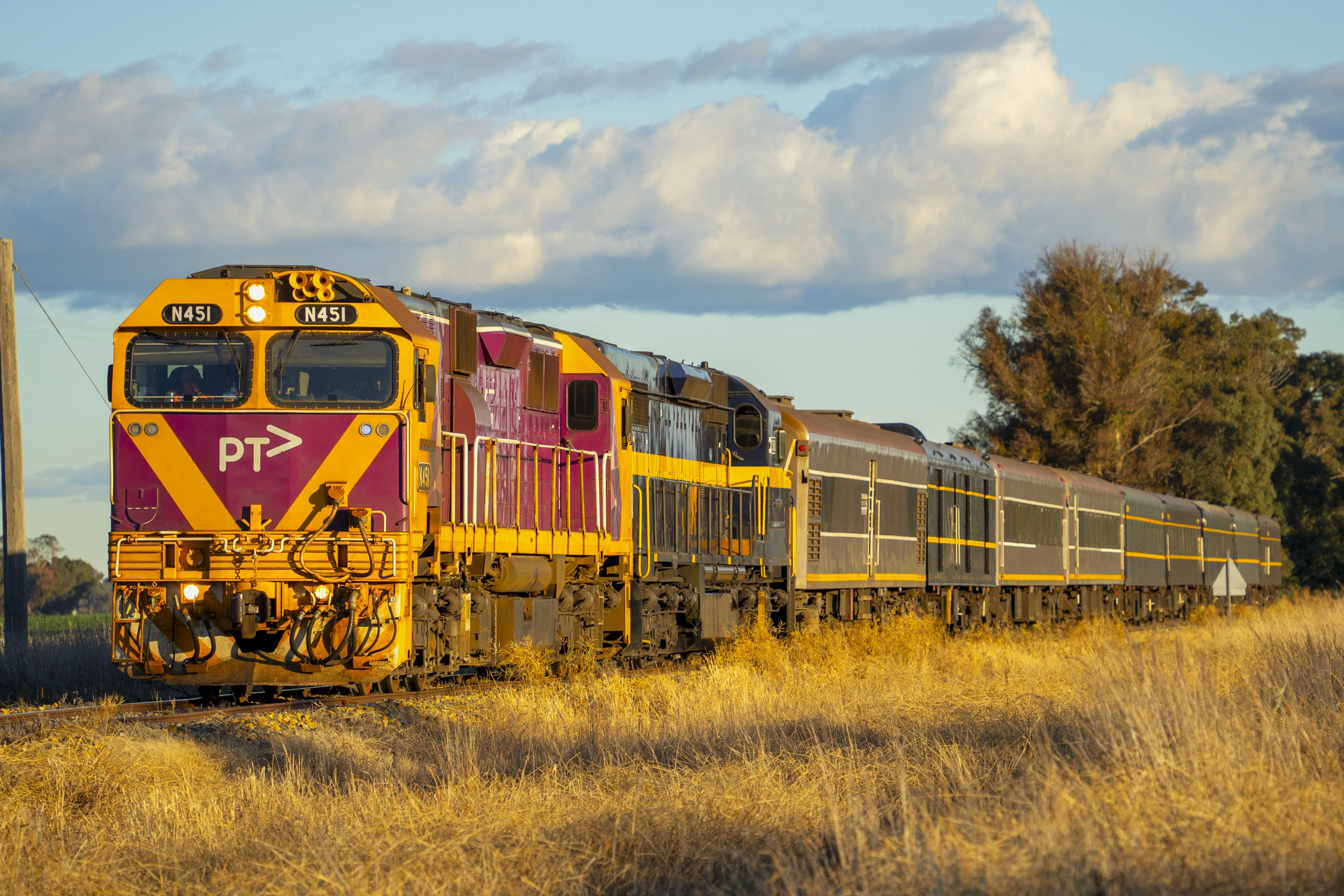
- V/Line N451 leading a SRHC tour to Yarrawonga on the Oaklands Line in June 2024
- Formation: 1983
- Type: Volunteer Organisation
- Purpose: Restoration & Operation of Heritage Rollingstock
- Location: Seymour Locomotive Depot
- Website: http://www.srhc.org.au/

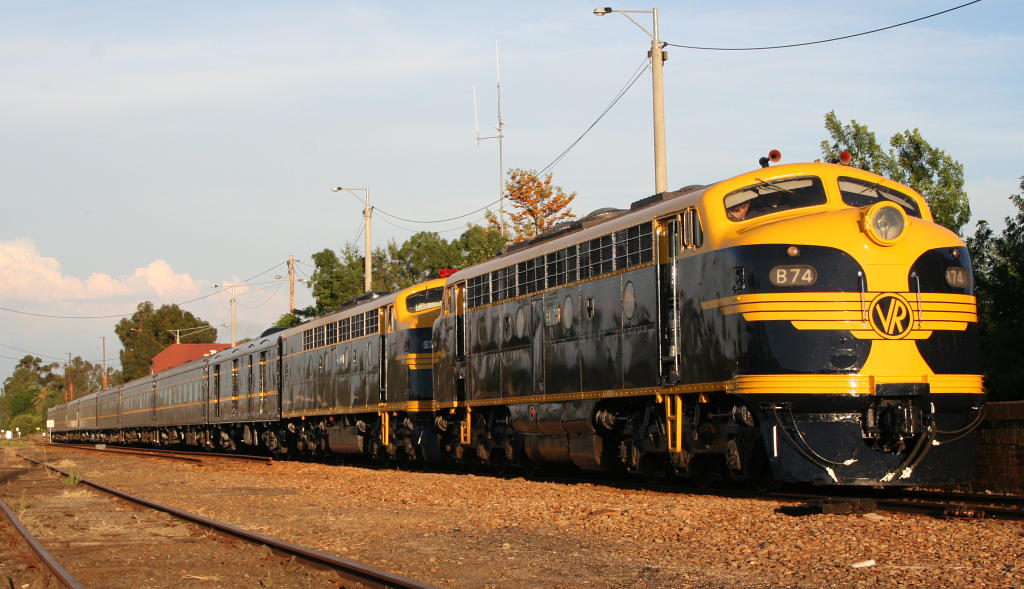
Locomotives B74 and S303 with the 1937 Spirit of Progress consist, as restored by the Seymour Railway Heritage Centre in 2007

The Seymour Railway Heritage Centre (SRHC) is a railway preservation group based in Seymour, Victoria, Australia. The volunteer non-profit incorporated association was established in 1983 as the Seymour Loco Steam Preservation Group to restore and preserve locomotives and rolling stock as used on the railways of Victoria, being named for the Seymour Loco Depot and established by former and then-current employees of the facility. The name change had taken place by December 1996.

The group is an accredited railway operator under the Victorian Rail Safety Act 2006, permitting it to move trains within its own depot. The group is also accredited to maintain and provide rolling stock on the Victorian railway network, running charters, tourist and railfan specials across the state with their fleet of restored trains. Since the early 2000s, it is also a provider of locomotives to freight operator SSR, and previously Qube, SCT and El Zorro until the latter ceased trading.

== Fleet ==
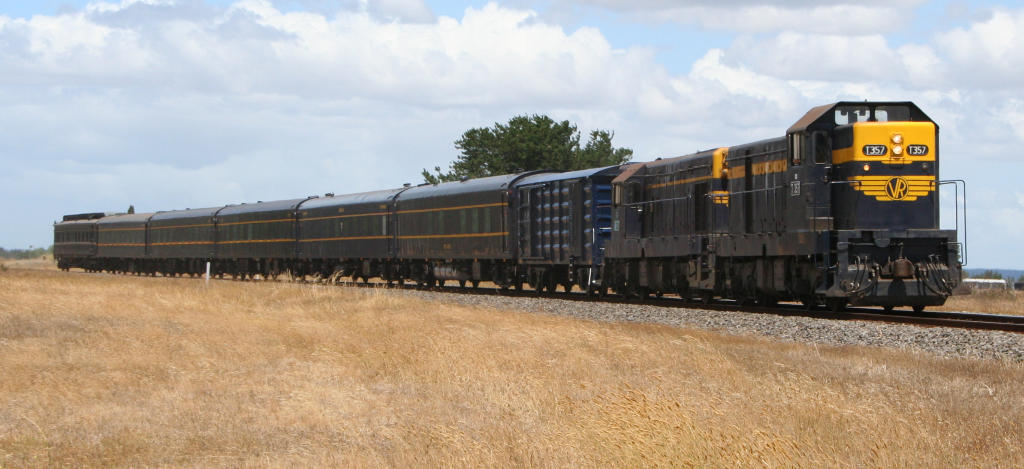
Locomotives T357 and T320 on a Seymour Railway Heritage Centre tour

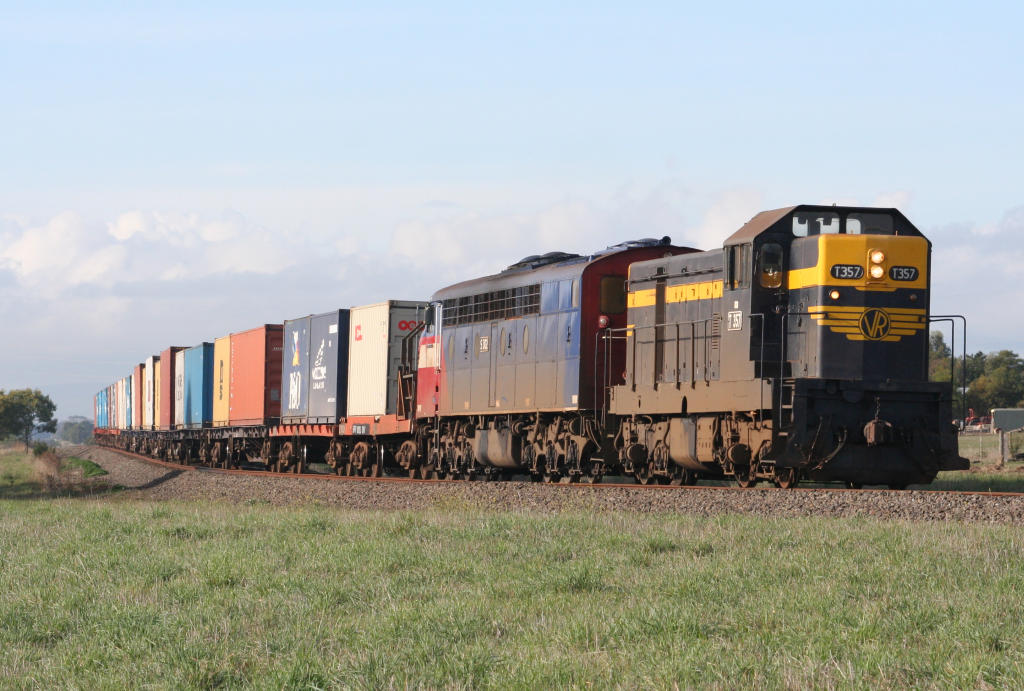
T357 on hire to El Zorro with S302 on a Warrnambool freight in 2008

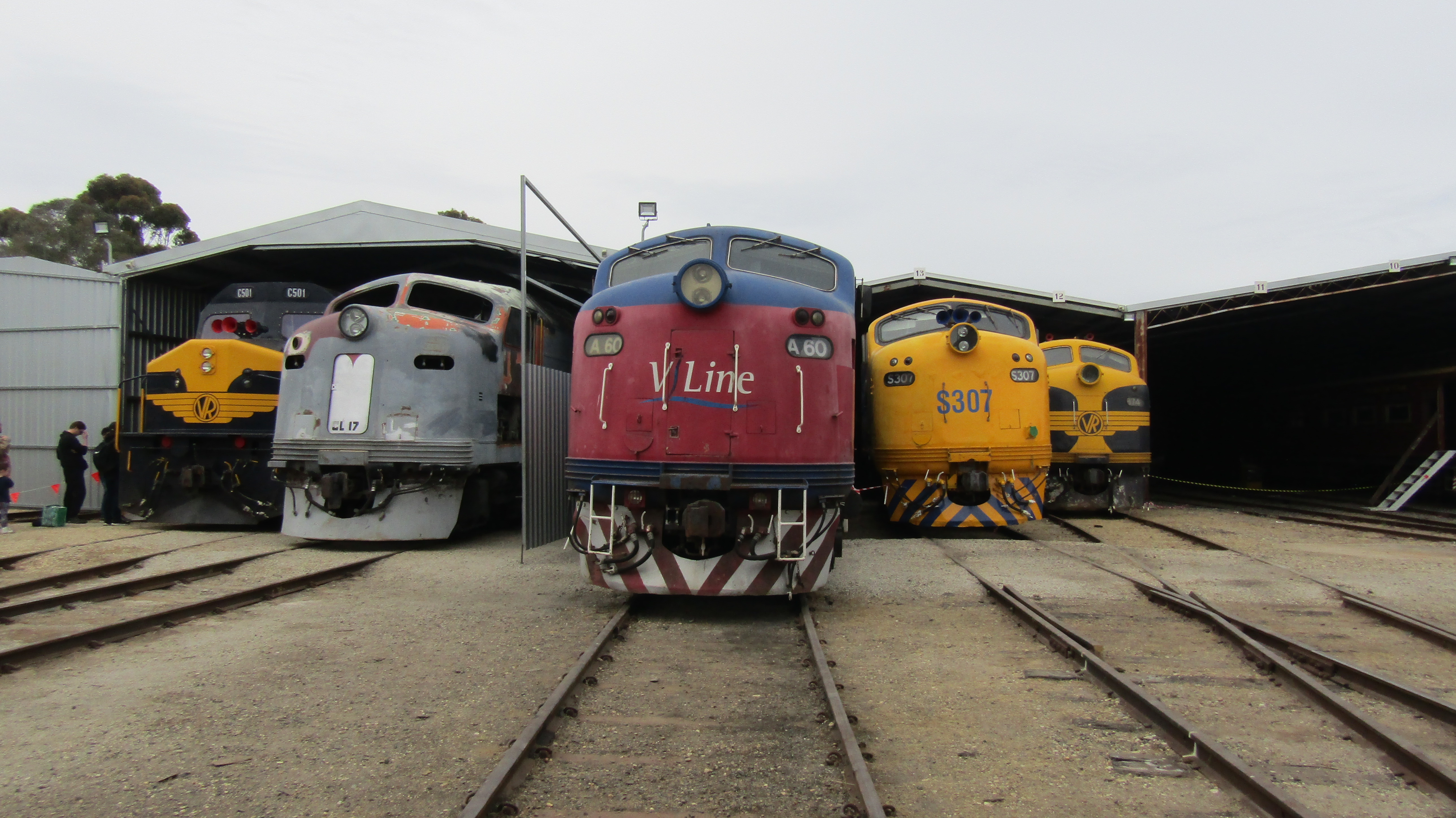
From left to right, C501, privately owned CL17, A60, S307 and B74 at the Seymour depot during an open day in 2024

The Seymour Railway Heritage Centre is the custodian of a number of heritage pieces of rolling stock owned by the Victorian Government (by either VicTrack or V/Line), which are on a permanent lease basis as well as other rolling stock owned outright.

Locomotives in the custody of the group include steam locomotives J515, mainline diesels C501, S303, X31 and B74 and a number of smaller branchline T class locomotives, (T320, T357 & T378). Also 600 hp diesel railcar DRC43.

Locomotives owned by the group are: GM36, T378, T382, K176 & J512.

Carriages in the group's collection include 1906 E type wooden sitting and sleeping carriages as used on the Adelaide Express and The Overland, the majority of the original 1937 Spirit of Progress consist, and carriages used on Victorian Railways Royal Trains.

In 2007, the Seymour Railway Heritage Centre was provided with funding from the VicTrack Heritage Program for the restoration of the Spirit of Progress consist and heritage diesel locomotives B74 and S303, and on 25 November 2007 a commemorative run was made for the 70th anniversary of the first Spirit of Progress service.

== New additions ==
In late August 2009, locomotives S310 and T382 were transferred to Seymour and became part of the SRHC collection. Both units were delivered in a non-operational state with T382 being the first to undergo re-activation as well as a full bodywork overhaul and repaint into the Victorian Railways blue and gold livery and ran its first tour on 18 December 2021 to Tocumwal, New South Wales. Restoration of S310 has been put on hold and will be restored at a later date.

In early January 2010, X31 was transferred to Seymour and became part of the SRHC collection. This event made X31 the first of its class to enter preservation. 31 underwent a full bodywork overhaul and repaint into Victorian Railways blue and gold livery, then entered traffic as a heritage unit on hire to El Zorro in March 2011. Until the transfer to Seymour, X31 was part of the Pacific National fleet and had spent many months in storage.

In early 2012, the SRHC purchased diesel locomotive GM28 (displayed as GM22) and three carriages located in Port Pirie, South Australia. Two of the carriages being sitting lounges and one a kitchen and dining area (All carriages have been burnt and vandalised after the train was moved behind a building in 2009). The group paid $33,000 in total, the train is still sitting at Port Pirie station until it can be removed. Trashed former display locomotive GM28 masquerading as GM22 departed Port Pirie bound for the Seymour Railway Heritage Centre, 26 June 2012. The trashed carriages have been moved out onto railway land out near Coonamia.

In August 2017, ex-Pacific National locomotive X37 was transferred over to Seymour and was originally apart of the SRHC collection. In 2025, it had been sold to Watco and in July 2026 was repainted into their corporate colours. In August 2026, it was transferred dead-attached from Seymour to SCTs depot in Laverton, where it was again transferred to Kwinana where final fit-outs are carried out before its return to service.

In June 2020, VicTrack Heritage allocated locomotive A60 to the SRHC collection. This event sees the First Mainline Diesel Electric Locomotive for the Victorian Railways preserved and retained for future generations. A60 is the class leader of the A Class Locomotives and formerly the B Class Locomotive (prior to its rebuild). As of April 2021, A60 is still in its V/Line Red and Blue livery and is not in an operational condition, A60 will be restored back into traffic within the near future. A60 has been also been nominated and formally enlisted to be an asset of significant Victorian State Heritage for being the first mainline diesel electric locomotive to the Victorian Railways.

In January 2024, Seymour announced that Pacific National had gifted the organization A78 after being stored for many years at Bendigo Workshops with an uncertain future.

In July 2026, SRHC restored locomotive T375 back to operational condition after being stored for 30 years and is now in the SRHC collection.

== Rolling stock ==
=== Locomotives ===
Number	Image	Year built	Builder	Status	Gauge	Notes
J512		1954	Vulcan Foundry	Dismantled, Awaiting overhaul	B/G	
J515		1954	Vulcan Foundry	Out of Traffic, Overhaul	B/G	To visit transfer to the Victorian Goldfields Railway in 2006 and Returned to traffic in mid April 2012. Loaned from Seymour Railway Heritage Centre. Returned to Seymour 24 January 2015 for major overhaul and awaiting test run.
K176		1941	Newport Workshops	Stored	B/G	
A60		1952, rebuilt in 1983 to A60	Clyde Engineering, Granville, Rebuilt at: Clyde Engineering, Rosewater	Stored	B/G	First Mainline Diesel locomotive in the history of the Victorian Railways. Named "Sir Harold Clapp" when it entered service in 1952.
A78		1953, rebuilt in 1984 to A78	Clyde Engineering, Granville, Rebuilt at: Clyde Engineering, Rosewater	Stored	B/G	
B74		1953	Clyde Engineering, Granville	Operational	B/G	
C501		1977	Clyde Engineering, Rosewater	Operational	S/G	
GM28		1963	Clyde Engineering, Granville	Stored	S/G	
GM36		1966	Clyde Engineering, Granville	Operational	S/G	
P19		1985	Clyde Engineering, Granville	Stored	B/G	Acquired from Ettamogha Rail Hub in February 2025, under restoration.
S303		1957	Clyde Engineering, Granville	Operational	S/G	Stored awaiting repairs after suffering minor fire damage in January 2023.
S307		1957	Clyde Engineering, Granville	Operational	B/G	Sold to the Seymour Railway Heritage Centre on 17 March 2023. Ran its first tour on July 14, 2023.
S310		1960	Clyde Engineering, Granville	Stored	B/G	
T320		1955	Clyde Engineering, Granville	Stored	B/G	
T342		1956	Clyde Engineering, Granville	Operational	B/G	Privately owned.
T357		1961	Clyde Engineering, Granville	Operational	S/G	
T375		1964	Clyde Engineering, Granville	Operational	B/G	Privately owned.
T378		1964	Clyde Engineering, Granville	Operational	B/G	T378 has been fitted with an EMD 8-645E engine. fitted with an ICE radio so can lead.
T382		1964	Clyde Engineering, Granville	Operational	S/G	Not fitted with an ICE radio so can not lead.
X31		1966	Clyde Engineering, Granville, and Rosewater	Operational	S/G	
Y102		1963	Clyde Engineering, Granville	Operational	B/G	Used for shunting only.
Y104		1963	Clyde Engineering, Granville	Stored	B/G	Stored as a parts source.

=== Carriages and vans ===
Class	Image	Type	Built	Top speed (km/h)	Number	Status	Notes
E type carriage		Passenger carriage	Newport Workshops	80 km/h (wooden carriage restriction)	10	10 Operational	2AE, 30AE, 1BE, 14BE, 26BE, 5ABE, 16ABE, 3BCE, Yarra Parlor Car & State Car 4 are operational on broad gauge.
H Type Carriage		Passenger carriage	Newport Workshops	115 km/h	9	9 Operational	BCH131, BIH191, BTH171, BCH132, BH152, BTH172, BCH133, BH153 & BTH173 are operational on broad gauge.
N type carriage		Passenger carriage	Newport Workshops	115 km/h	4	4 Operational	ACN3, BRN46, BRN53 & BN19 are operational on standard gauge.
S type carriage		Passenger carriage	Newport Workshops	115 km/h	18	10 Operational	3AS, 4AS, 1BS, 11BS, 1CS & Parlor Car are operational on standard gauge. 3BS, Mitta Mitta, Dining Car & State Car 5 are operational on broad gauge.
Z type carriage		Passenger carriage	Newport Workshops	115 km/h	4	4 Operational	VAM1, BTN 264 & BZN 267 are operational on broad gauge. PZ10 is operational on standard gauge.
Z vans		Guard’s van	Newport Workshops	80 km/h (wooden carriage restriction)	3	3 Stored	Stored, pending restoration.

== See also ==
- Seymour railway station
- Tourist and Heritage Railways Act
