= Victorian Railways S class (diesel) =

Class of Australian diesel-electric locomotives

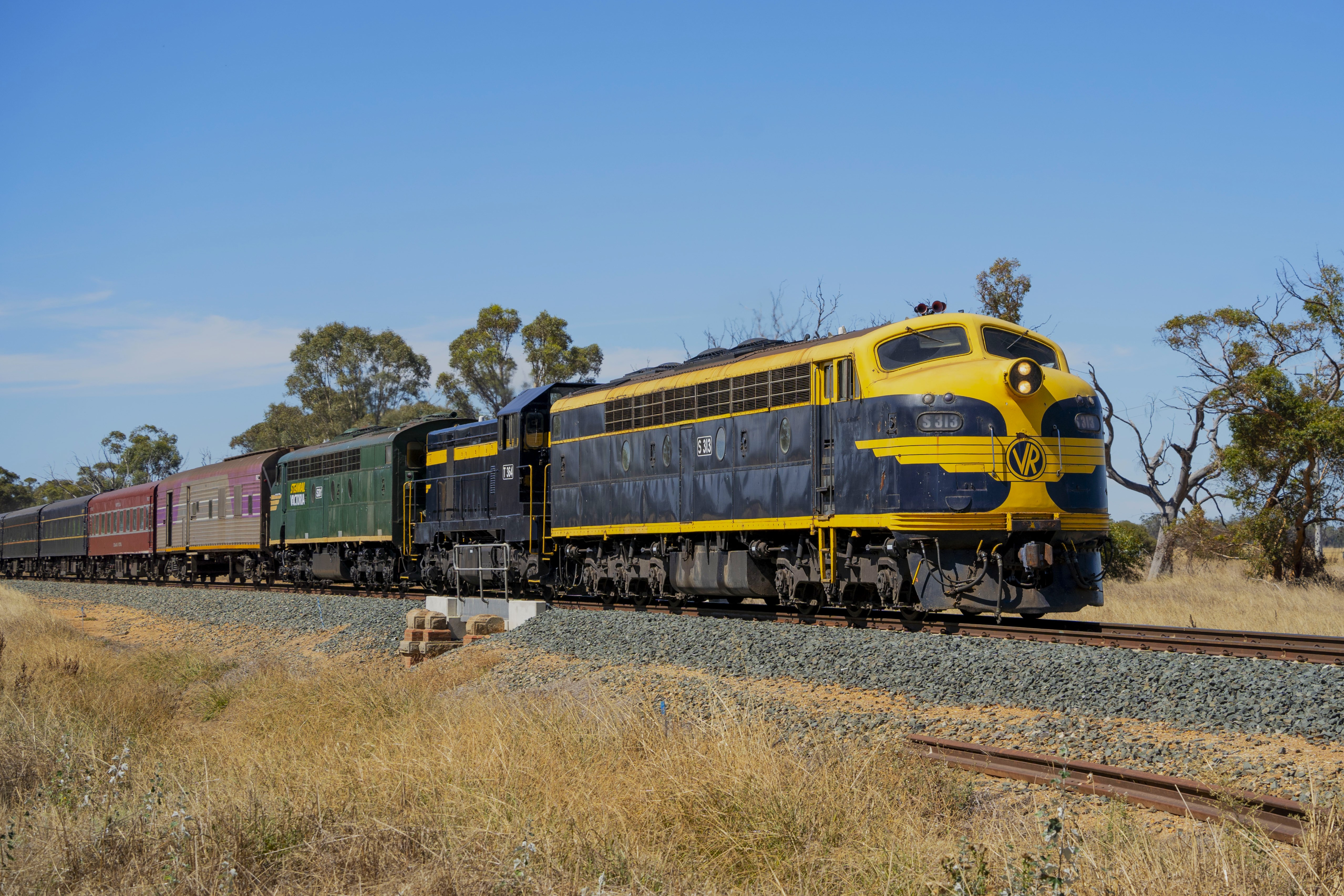
- Preserved Steamrail Victoria S313 hauling a heritage special through Avonmore, Victoria, January 2025
Type and origin
- Power type: Diesel-electric
- Builder: Clyde Engineering, Granville
- Model: EMD A7 (first order); EMD A16C (second order)
- Build date: 1957–1961
- Total produced: 18
Specifications
- Configuration
  - UIC: Co′Co′
  - Commonwealth: Co-Co
- Gauge: 1,435 mm (4 ft 8 1/2 in), 1,600 mm (5 ft 3 in)
- Length: 18.72 m (61 ft 5 in)
- Axle load: 19.3 t (19.0 long tons; 21.3 short tons)
- Loco weight: 116 t (114 long tons; 128 short tons)
- Fuel type: Diesel
- Prime mover: EMD 16-567C
- RPM range: 300–950rpm
- Engine type: V16
- Aspiration: Supercharged (Roots blower)
- Displacement: 9072ci total
- Generator: EMD D12/D22
- Traction motors: EMD D27/D37/D47
- Head end power: Nil
- Cylinders: 16
- Cylinder size: 567ci
- Transmission: Diesel-electric
- Train brakes: A7/B7
Performance figures
- Maximum speed: 133 km/h (83 mph)
- Power output: 1,350 kW (1,810 hp)
Career
- Operators: Victorian Railways
- Number in class: 18
- Numbers: S300–S317
- Nicknames: Bulldogs, Streamliners
- Delivered: 1957
- First run: 21 August 1957
- Last run: 7 December 1961
- Preserved: S300, S301, S303, S306, S307, S308, S310, S313
- Current owner: VicTrack Heritage; Seymour Railway Heritage Centre; Steamrail Victoria; Southern Shorthaul Railroad
- Disposition: 4 in service, 4 preserved, 4 stored, 6 scrapped

The S class are a class of diesel locomotives built by Clyde Engineering, Granville for the Victorian Railways between 1957 and 1961.

== History ==
The S class was based on the Electro-Motive Diesel F7 design and were very similar to the GM12 class then being built by Clyde Engineering for the Commonwealth Railways. They were mechanically similar to the 1952 built double ended B class.

=== Delivery ===
The first order for 10 locomotives were progressively delivered between August 1957 and February 1958. The first four took the names and numbers of the recently scrapped S class steam locomotives, with all being named after prominent Victorians. An additional eight locomotives were ordered for use on the new North East standard gauge line and delivered between November 1960 and December 1961.

The first locomotives were built in New South Wales and tested both as light engines (without trains) and later hauling trains, then they were delivered to Wodonga in Victoria and converted to broad gauge on cranes there. Later locomotives ran through to Melbourne on the then-under-construction standard gauge mainline. S316, the second-to-last, was utilised on a consolidating train (to help settle recently laid ballast) between Wodonga and Seymour on 29 November 1961, then later it and classmate S317 ran an inspection train as far as Sunshine.

On 3 January 1962 the first through freight trains between Sydney and Melbourne arrived at and departed North Dynon, worked by engines S313, S314, S315, S316 and S317 between Melbourne and Albury in various combinations. On 10 April 1962 S317 worked with Victorian carriage 1VFK to test clearances in the newly constructed Spencer Street standard gauge platform, and one of the bogie-mounted brake cylinders fouled the new structure of Platform 2. S310, S311 and S312 had been in use on the broad gauge network following delivery, but all three were moved to the standard gauge by 14 April 1962. S305 worked on standard gauge from October 1964 for around five months, to allow other engines (starting with S310) to enter South Dynon workshops for maintenance. However, the engine failed and so S312 was forced back into service to fill gaps in the roster without undergoing repairs.

=== Utilisation ===
The class were initially used on express passenger trains such as the Intercapital Daylight, Southern Aurora, Spirit of Progress and The Overland, but were also used on fast freights. On the broad gauge, they often operated in pairs, while on the standard gauge they usually ran solo. A second 'hostlers' cab was provided at the number two end, but was only used around depots, or to haul empty carriages short distances.

In February 1969, two were destroyed in the Violet Town railway disaster, and were deemed uneconomical to repair and scrapped. In January 1967 S317 was badly damaged in a head-on collision with X33 south of Broadford Loop and was returned to Clyde Engineering for rebuilding. In June 1982, S317 was again involved in a fatal accident when it ran into the rear of the Spirit of Progress at Barnawartha, killing the crew.

As more modern locomotives were introduced, those on the standard gauge moved to the broad gauge. Examples would periodically appear on the standard gauge.

When the G Class engines entered service, the railways declared that no more S Class engines would undergo major overhauls. The last two had been S301 in 1985 and S307 in 1986; as of July 1987, engines S303, 304, 305 and 309 were withdrawn, 308 banned as a leading unit and 306 was under minor repair but still in the VR Blue livery. In February 1994, four (300, 302, 311, 312) were sold to West Coast Railway for use on their Melbourne to Warrnambool passenger service. By April 1999, only four remained in the V/Line fleet and even these were only used during periods of high demand. A few have been preserved.

The first known working of an S class locomotive east of Dandenong was on the 28 June 1986 run of the 8:25 am Bairnsdale passenger service, with N455 leading east-facing S309. S class engines were considered "familiar" on the Gippsland corridor by 1988, replacing withdrawn L class electric engines working briquette trains.

Engine locations were recorded as at 8 June 1987, thus:

Engine	Livery	Location	Status/allocation
S300	V/Line	Ballarat East Loco depot	Wheat trains
S301	V/Line	South Dynon	Standard gauge
S302	VR	Albury	
S303	VR	South Dynon	For soundproofing modifications
S304	VR	Albury	
S305	VR	Withdrawn early 1986	
S306	VR	Bendigo	Wheat trains
S307	V/Line	Ararat	Briquette trains
S308	VR	South Dynon	For soundproofing modifications
S309	V/Line	Geelong	Wheat trains
S310	V/Line	Traralgon	Briquette trains
S311	VR	Bendigo	Wheat trains
S312	V/Line	Geelong	Wheat trains
S313	V/Line	Bendigo	Wheat trains
S315	V/Line	Bendigo	Wheat trains
S317	V/Line	Geelong	Goods trains

Due to complaints of excessive noise, S303 and S308 were been banned from use except as trailing engines on The Overland; on the date cited, S303 was being modified at South Dynon in an attempt to resolve the issue. S308 was also at Dynon, but for repairs to its traction motors. Otherwise, S class engines were mostly used on goods trains, including block grain, quarry and briquette services. Engine G521 was transferred to standard gauge in July 1987, which freed up S301 and X41 to return to broad gauge. S303 was returned to service, still restricted to a trailing unit only, on 20 July 1987, while S308 was being held at Dynon Workshops waiting for traction motors to be retrieved from the withdrawn B67 and B72. S301 was restored to broad gauge by this date.

=== Privatisation era ===
Privatisation brought an upturn in the class' fortunes with some overhauled and as at May 2014, they remain in service with CFCL Australia, Pacific National and Southern Shorthaul Railroad. In 2019, S300 and S311 were purchased privately from CFCLA. S311 was purchased from its private owner by SSR in mid 2020 and was promptly returned to service, still on standard gauge operating primarily in NSW. Pacific National donated S307 to the Seymour Railway Heritage Centre on 17 March 2023. Pacific National donated S301 to Steamrail Victoria on 7 March 2024, and it is now used on heritage operations. In 2025, the Pacific National patches that had been applied over S301's Freight Australia logos were replaced with "Steamrail Victoria" logos in the style of the FA logos.

In late July 2025, S317 was repainted into a Victorian Railways-inspired black and yellow scheme and renamed "Jenny Nally". The locomotive had previously been renamed "Jenny Molloy" when SSR inherited it from its predecessor Great Northern Rail Services in 2003. The locomotive's namesake had died in 2024, and the repaint was a tribute to her. S300's private owner also entrusted his locomotive to Steamrail Victoria and Seven-O-Seven Operations for use on railtours in late September.

== Fleet status ==
Key:	In Service	Stored	Preserved	Under Restoration	Under Repair	Scrapped

Locomotive	Serial no	Name	Entered service	Withdrawn	Scrapped	Livery	Status	Owner(s)	Gauge	Notes
First Order										
S300	57-164	Matthew Flinders	21 Aug 1957			CFCLA Silver and Blue (Debranded)	Preserved – Operational	VR (Built), VicRail (1974), V/Line (1983), West Coast Railway (1994), CFCLA (2004), Privately owned (2019?)	1,435 mm (4 ft 8 1/2 in) standard gauge	Privately owned, Purchased from CFCL Australia
S301	57-165	Sir Thomas Mitchell	4 Sep 1957			Freight Australia Green and Yellow with Steamrail Logos	Preserved – Operational	VR (Built), VicRail (1974), V/Line (1983), Freight Australia (1999), Pacific National (2004), Steamrail Victoria (2024)	1,600 mm (5 ft 3 in) broad gauge	Donated to Steamrail Victoria in March 2024
S302	57-166	Edward Henty	18 Sep 1957			El Zorro Orange and Grey with SSR Logos	Scrapped - North Bendigo Workshops 2025	VR (Built), VicRail (1974), V/Line (1983), West Coast Railway (1994), V/Line Passenger (2004), El Zorro (2006), Southern Shorthaul Railroad (2014)	1,600 mm (5 ft 3 in) broad gauge	Scrapped due to fire damage suffered in March 2022.
S303	57-167	CJ La Trobe	30 Sep 1957	Jul 1988		VR Blue and Gold	Preserved – Operational	VR (Built), VicRail (1974), V/Line (1983), VicTrack Heritage Register (1990)	1,435 mm (4 ft 8 1/2 in) standard gauge	Allocated to Seymour Railway Heritage Centre
S304	57-168	George Bass	15 Oct 1957	May 1987	Mar 1992	VR Blue and Gold	Scrapped	VR (Built), VicRail (1974), V/Line (1983)	1,600 mm (5 ft 3 in) broad gauge	
S305	57-169	Hamilton Hume	4 Nov 1957	2 Dec 1985	Feb 1991	VR Blue and Gold	Scrapped	VR (Built), VicRail (1974), V/Line (1983)	1,600 mm (5 ft 3 in) broad gauge	
S306	57-170	John Batman	25 Nov 1957	Jun 2019		Pacific National Blue and Yellow	Out of Traffic – Overhaul	VR (Built), VicRail (1974), V/Line (1983), Freight Australia (1999), Pacific National (2004), 707 Operations (2023).	1,600 mm (5 ft 3 in) broad gauge	Returned to Broad Gauge in September 2018. Donated to 707 Operations in September 2023.
S307	57-171	John Pascoe Fawkner	10 Dec 1957			Pacific National Blue and Yellow	Preserved – Operational	VR (Built), VicRail (1974), V/Line (1983), Freight Australia (1999), Pacific National (2004), SRHC (2023)	1,435 mm (4 ft 8 1/2 in) standard gauge	Donated to the Seymour Railway Heritage Centre in March 2023
S308 (S^{D}308)	58-179	Sir Redmond Barry	20 Jan 1958	25 Jul 1988		V/Line Orange and Grey	Preserved – Static	VR (Built), VicRail (1974), V/Line (1983), VicTrack Heritage (????)	1,600 mm (5 ft 3 in) broad gauge	Allocated to the Newport Railway Museum for static display. Renumbered Sd308 as a demonstration unit
S309	58-182	William Lonsdale	24 Feb 1958	19 Jul 1988	1996	V/Line Orange and Grey	Scrapped	VR (Built), VicRail (1974), V/Line (1983)	1,600 mm (5 ft 3 in) broad gauge	
Second Order										
S310	60-227	George Higinbotham	25 Nov 1960			V/Line Orange and Grey	Stored	VR (Built), VicRail (1974), V/Line (1983), Freight Australia (1999), Pacific National (2004), Seymour Railway Heritage Centre (2013)	1,600 mm (5 ft 3 in) broad gauge	
S311	60-228	Sir Ferdinand von Mueller	16 Nov 1960			CFCLA Silver and Blue with SSR Logos	In Service	VR (Built), VicRail (1974), V/Line (1983), West Coast Railway (1994), CFCLA (2004), Privately Owned (2019?), Southern Shorthaul Railroad (2020)	1,435 mm (4 ft 8 1/2 in) standard gauge	
S312	60-229	Peter Lalor	27 Jan 1961			Rail Power Black with SSR Logos	Operational	VR (Built), VicRail (1974), V/Line (1983), West Coast Railway (1995), Rail Power (2011), SSR (2017)	1,435 mm (4 ft 8 1/2 in) standard gauge	
S313	61-230	Alfred Deakin	27 Feb 1961	14 Dec 1994		VR Blue and Gold	Preserved – Operational	VR (Built), VicRail (1974), V/Line (1983), VicTrack Heritage Register (1996)	1,600 mm (5 ft 3 in) broad gauge	Withdrawn after suffering a serious electrical fault, allocated to Steamrail Victoria in 1996, first ran in preservation in 1997
S314	61-231	Sir John O'Shanassy	20 Apr 1961	7 Feb 1969	7 Feb 1969	VR Blue and Gold	Scrapped	VR (Built)	1,435 mm (4 ft 8 1/2 in) standard gauge	destroyed Violet Town railway disaster
S315	61-238	Sir Charles Gavan Duffy	16 Oct 1961	23 Aug 1988	Apr 1992	V/Line Orange and Grey	Scrapped	VR (Built), VicRail (1974), V/Line (1983)	1,435 mm (4 ft 8 1/2 in) standard gauge	
S316	61-239	Sir Andrew Clarke	10 Nov 1961	7 Feb 1969	7 Feb 1969	VR Blue and Gold	Scrapped	VR (Built)	1,435 mm (4 ft 8 1/2 in) standard gauge	destroyed Violet Town railway disaster
S317	61-240	Jenny Nally	7 Dec 1961			Victorian Railways Inspired Black and Yellow	Operational	VR (Built), VicRail (1974), V/Line (1983), Great Northern (????), Southern Shorthaul Railroad (2004)	1,435 mm (4 ft 8 1/2 in) standard gauge	Originally named Sir John Monash. Initially renamed Jenny Molloy when first repainted into SSR livery, renamed to Jenny Nally in July 2025 as a tribute to Ms. Nally.

== Photo Gallery ==
Victorian Railways S class (diesel)

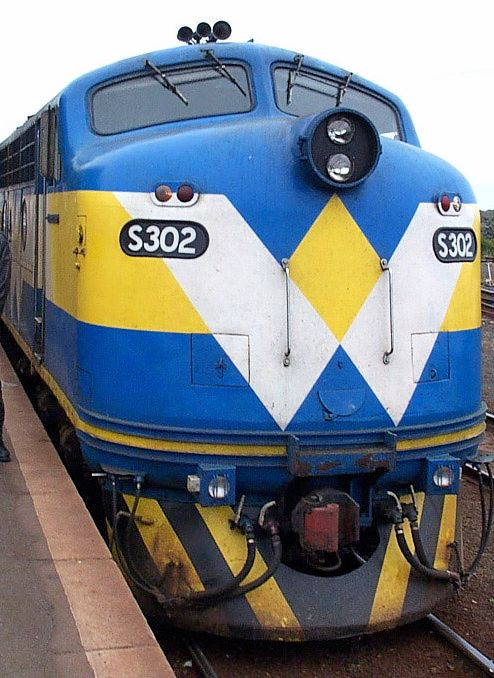
West Coast Railway liveried S302 in 2001

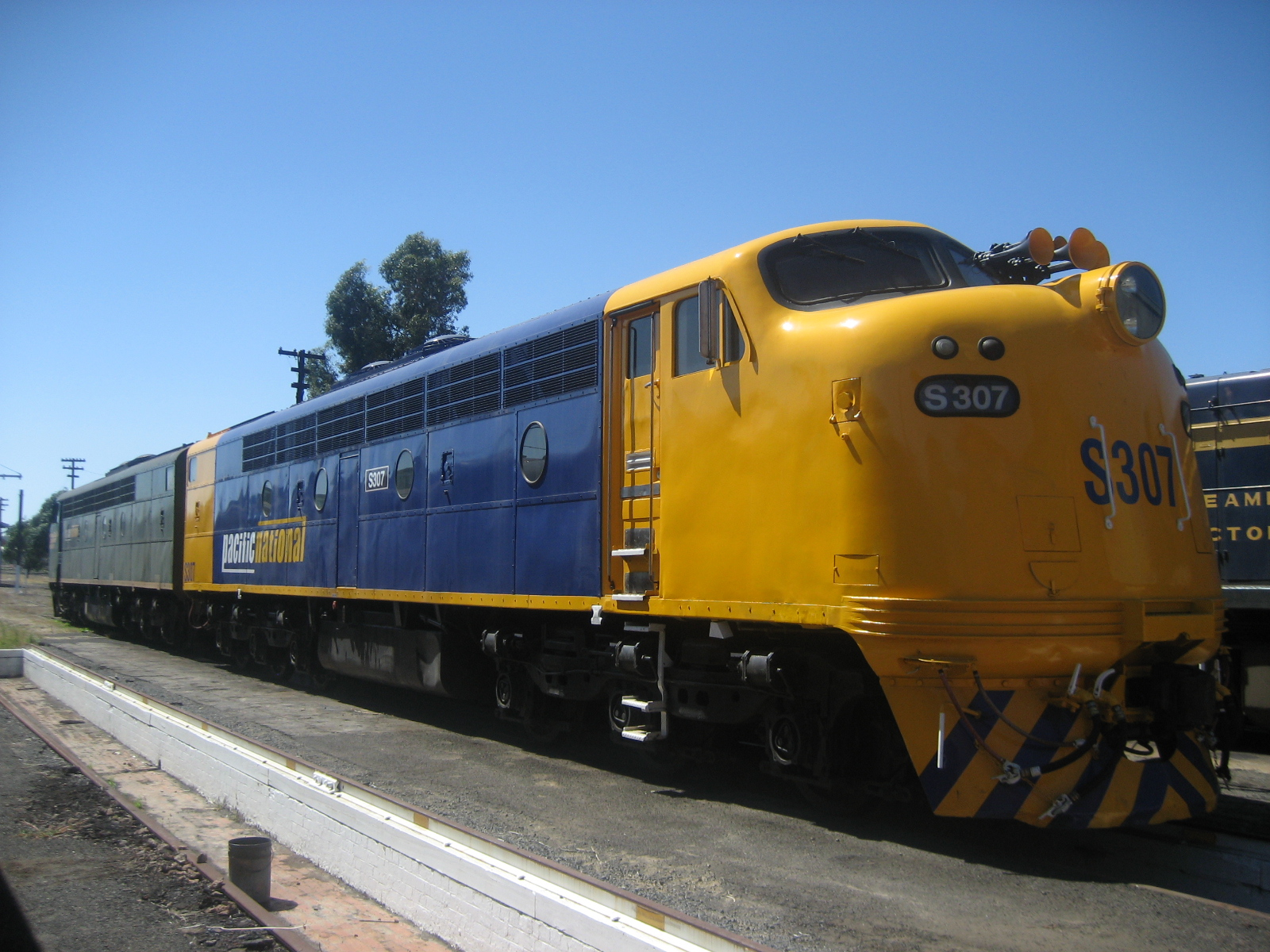
Pacific National liveried S307 at Newport Workshops in March 2008

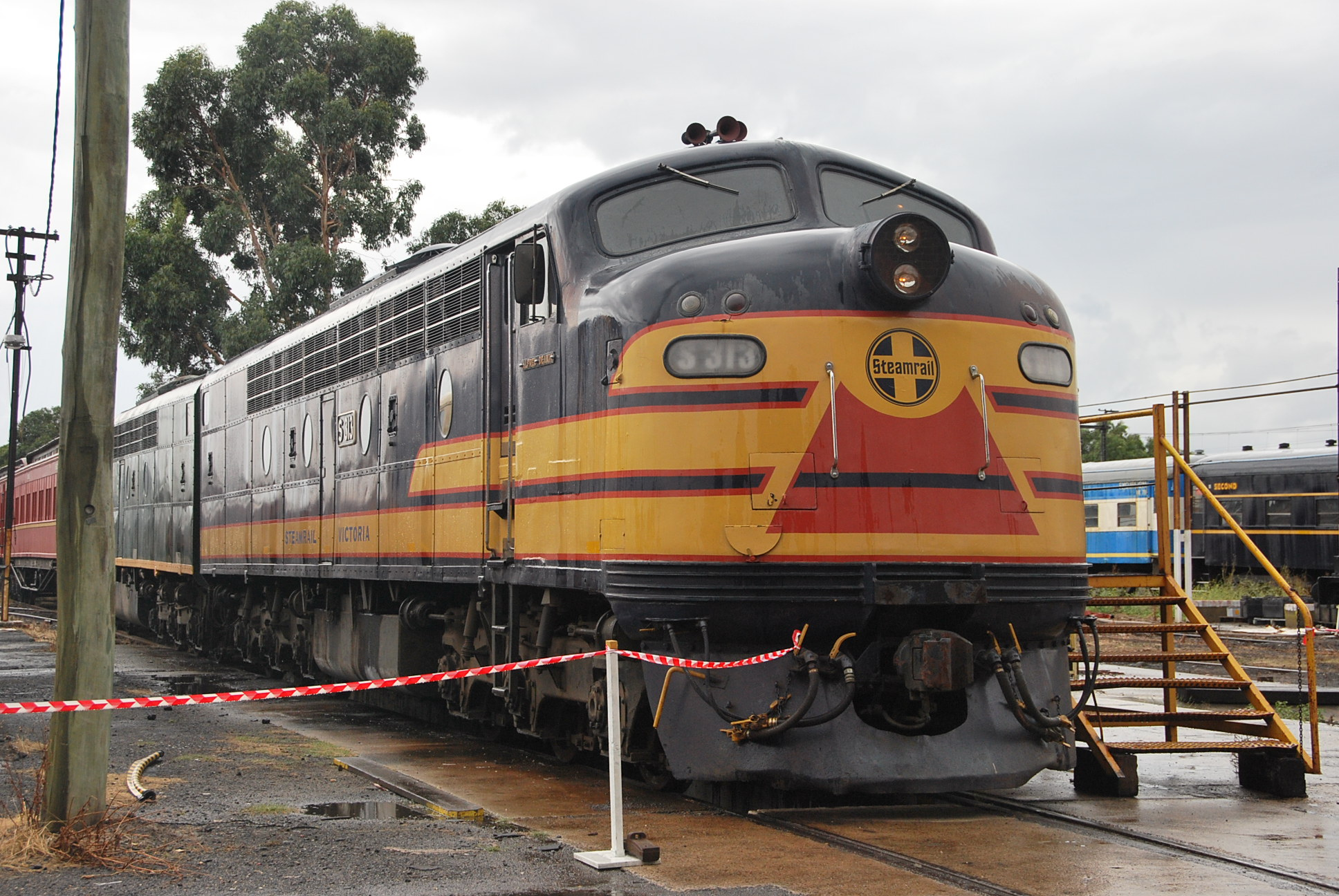
Steamrail Victoria's S313 at Newport Workshops on 8 March 2010

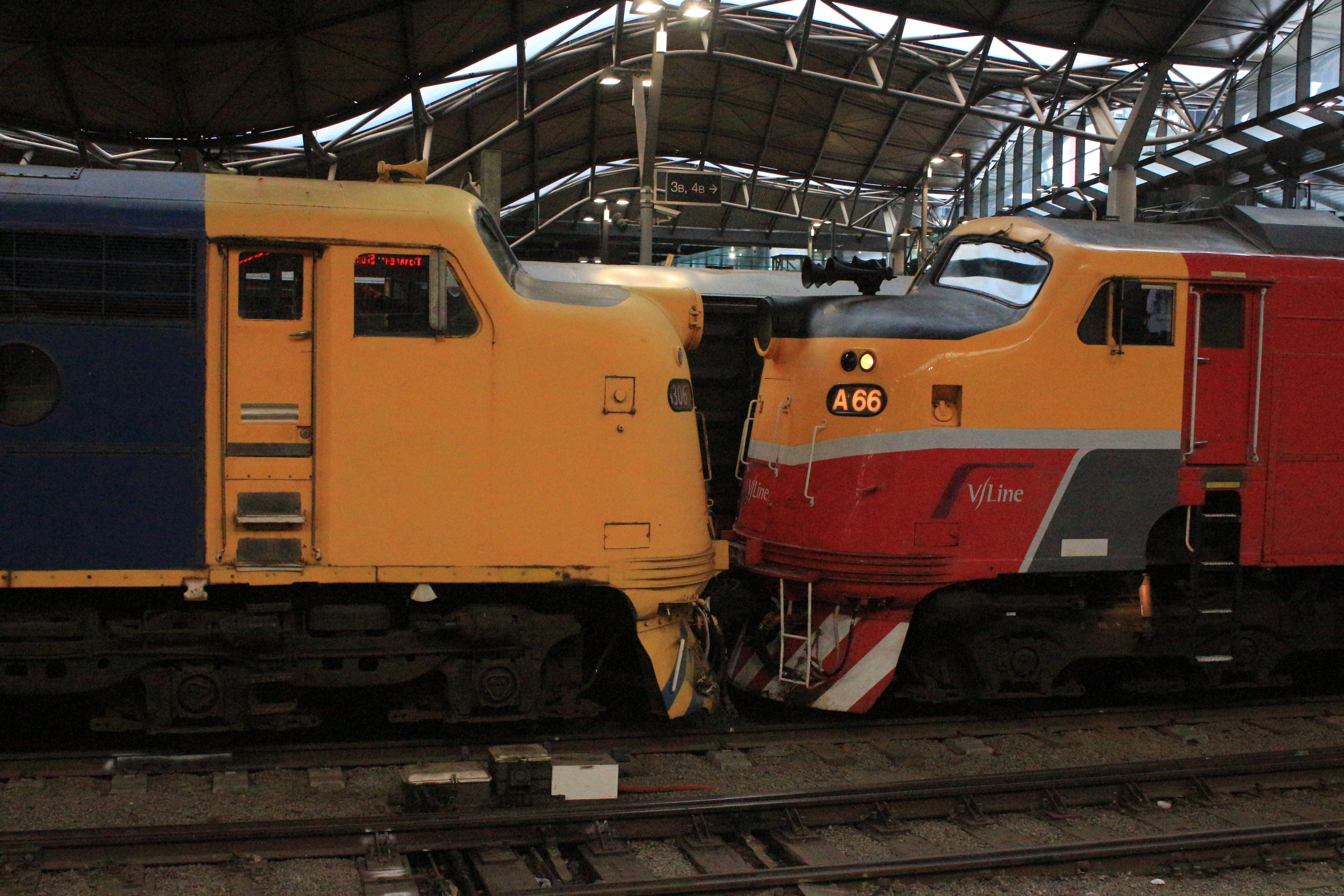
S306 nose to nose with A66 on a tour to Quambatook at Southern Cross on 6 March 2021

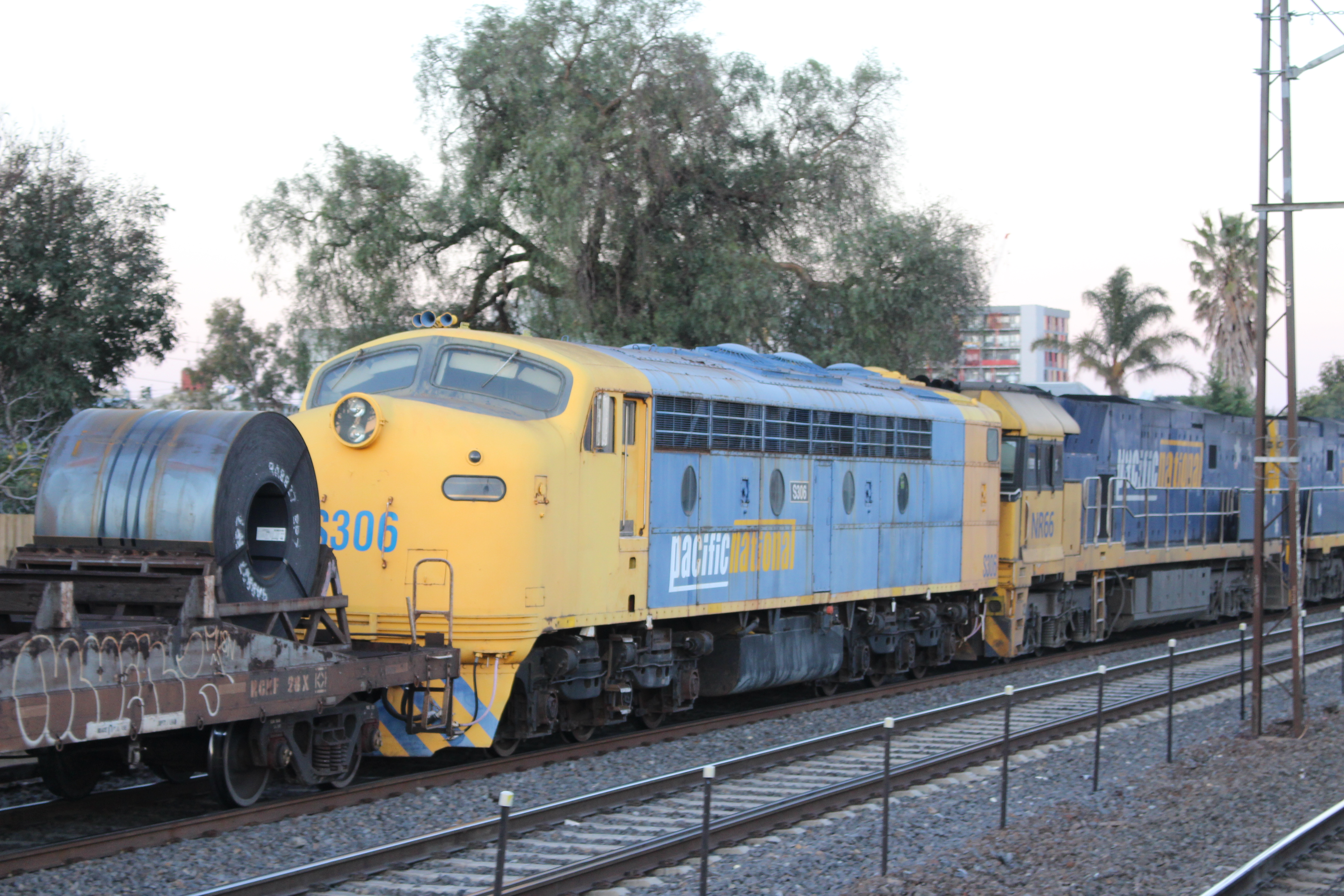
S306 trails NR66 and NR27 on #3WM2 at Middle Footscray on 11 September 2018

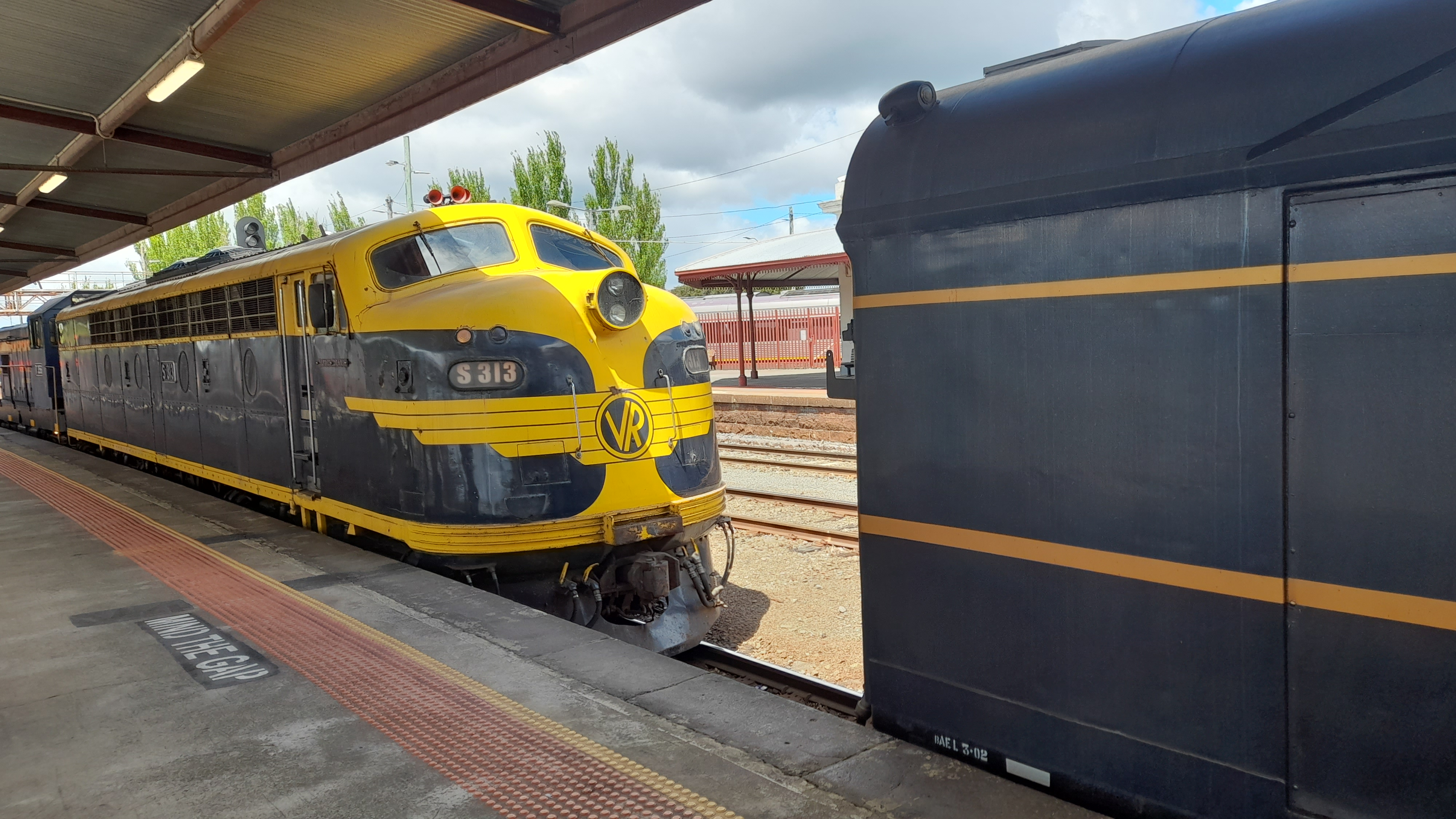
Steamrail Victoria's S313 at Ballarat Station on 30 October 2021

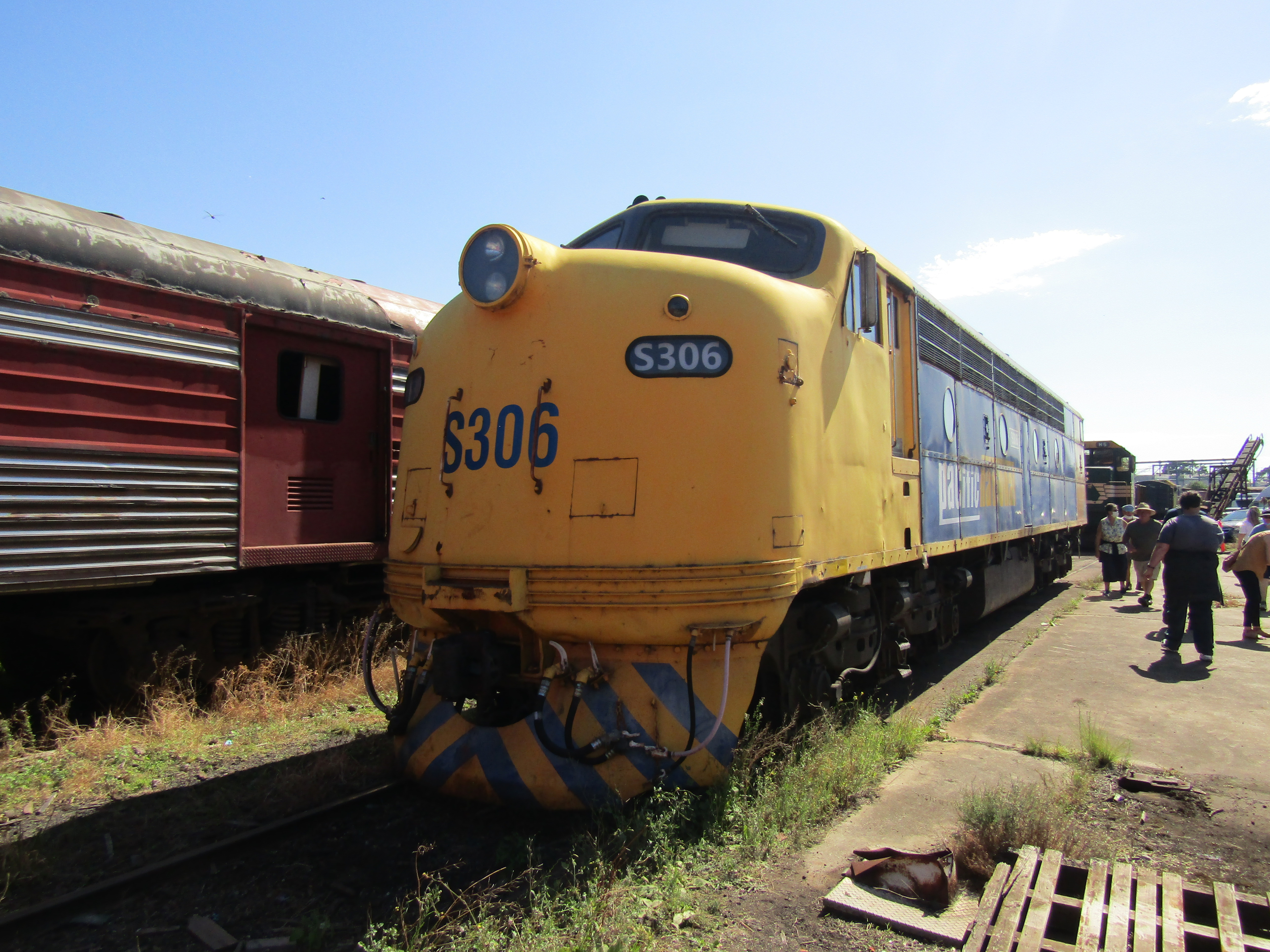
S306 at Newport Workshops on 13 March 2022

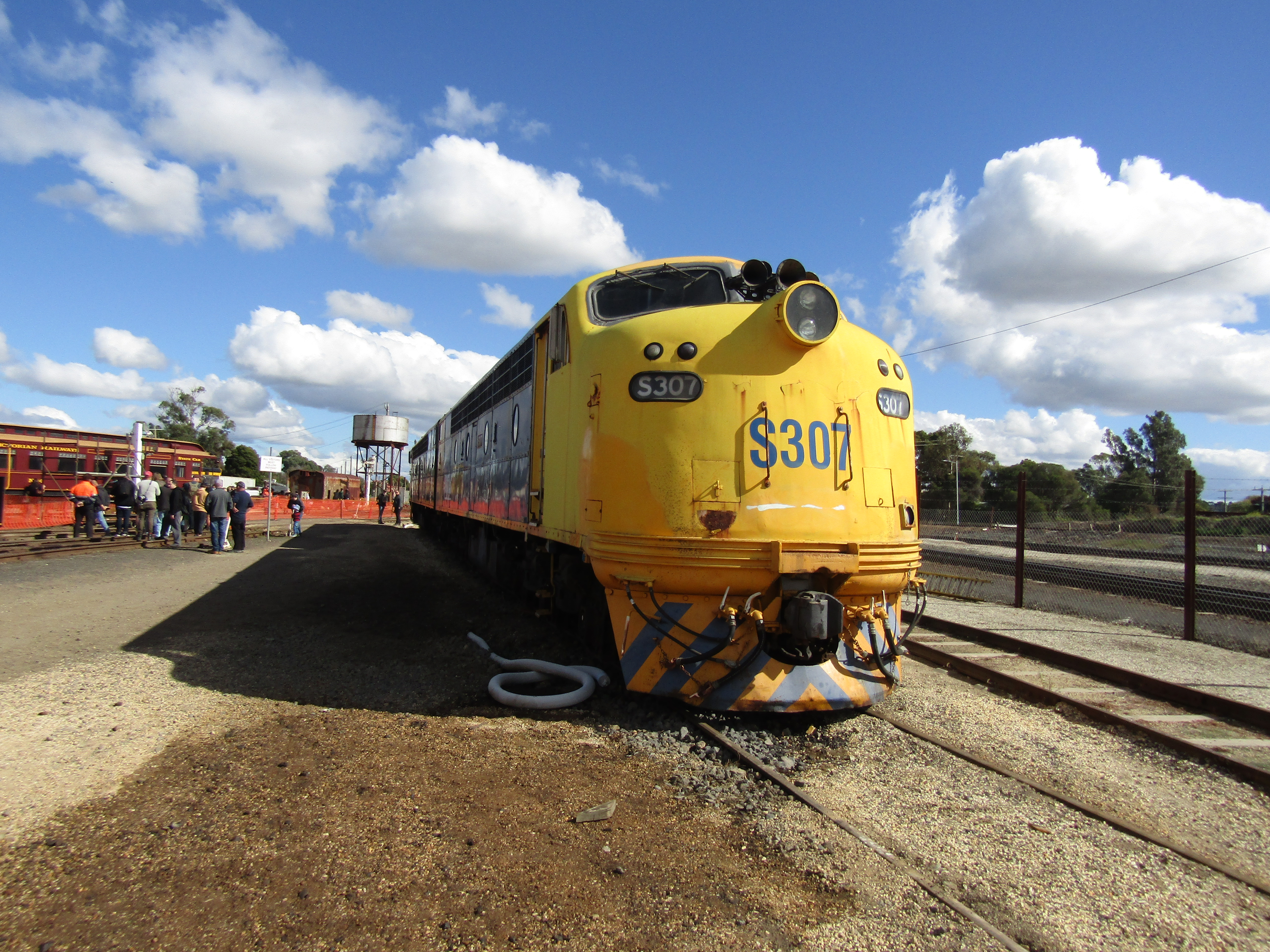
S307 at the Seymour Railway Heritage Centre depot on 29 April 2023

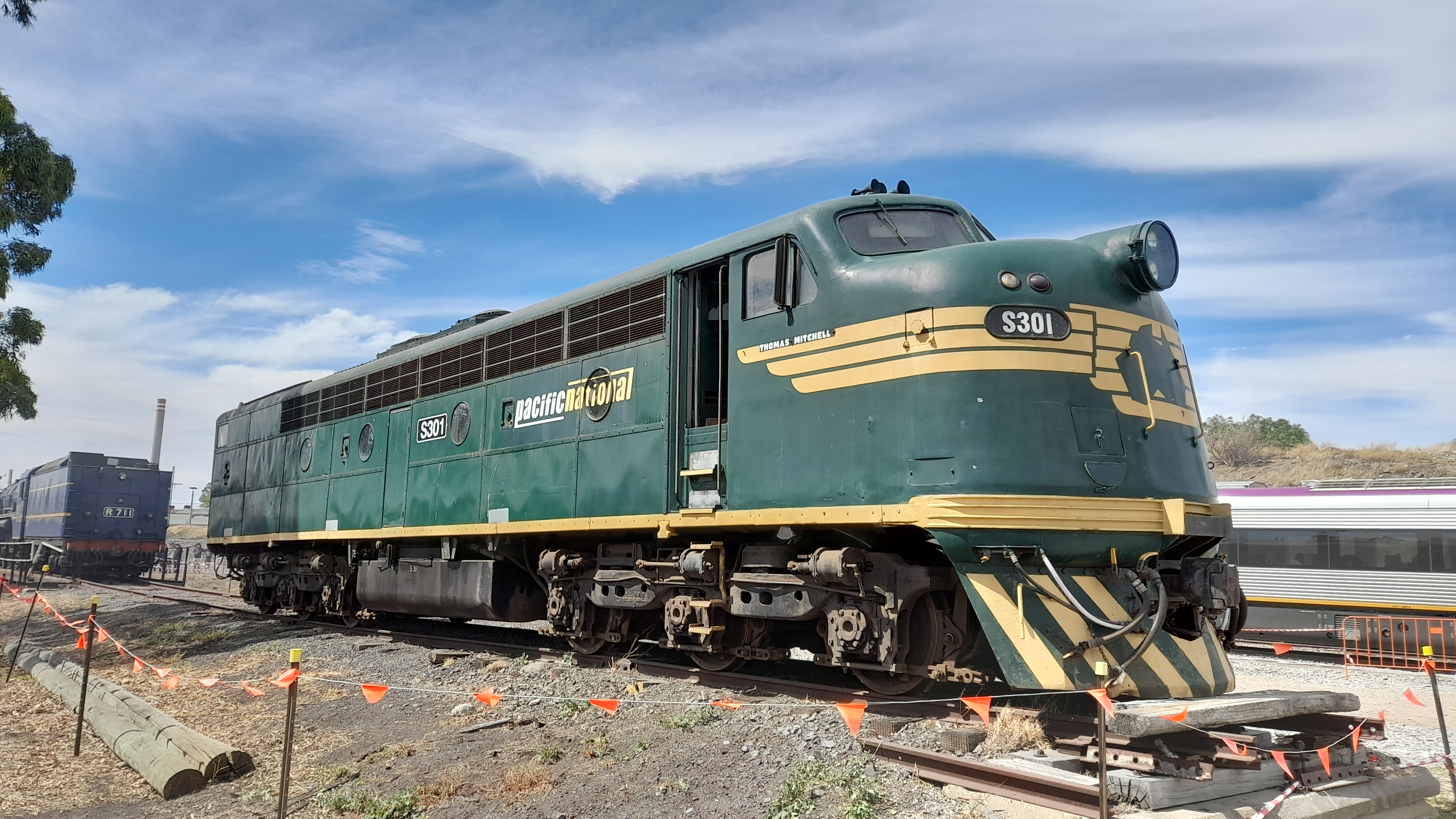
S301 at Newport Workshops on 11 March 2024
