= Carpolac railway line =

Former railway line in Victoria, Australia

Carpolac
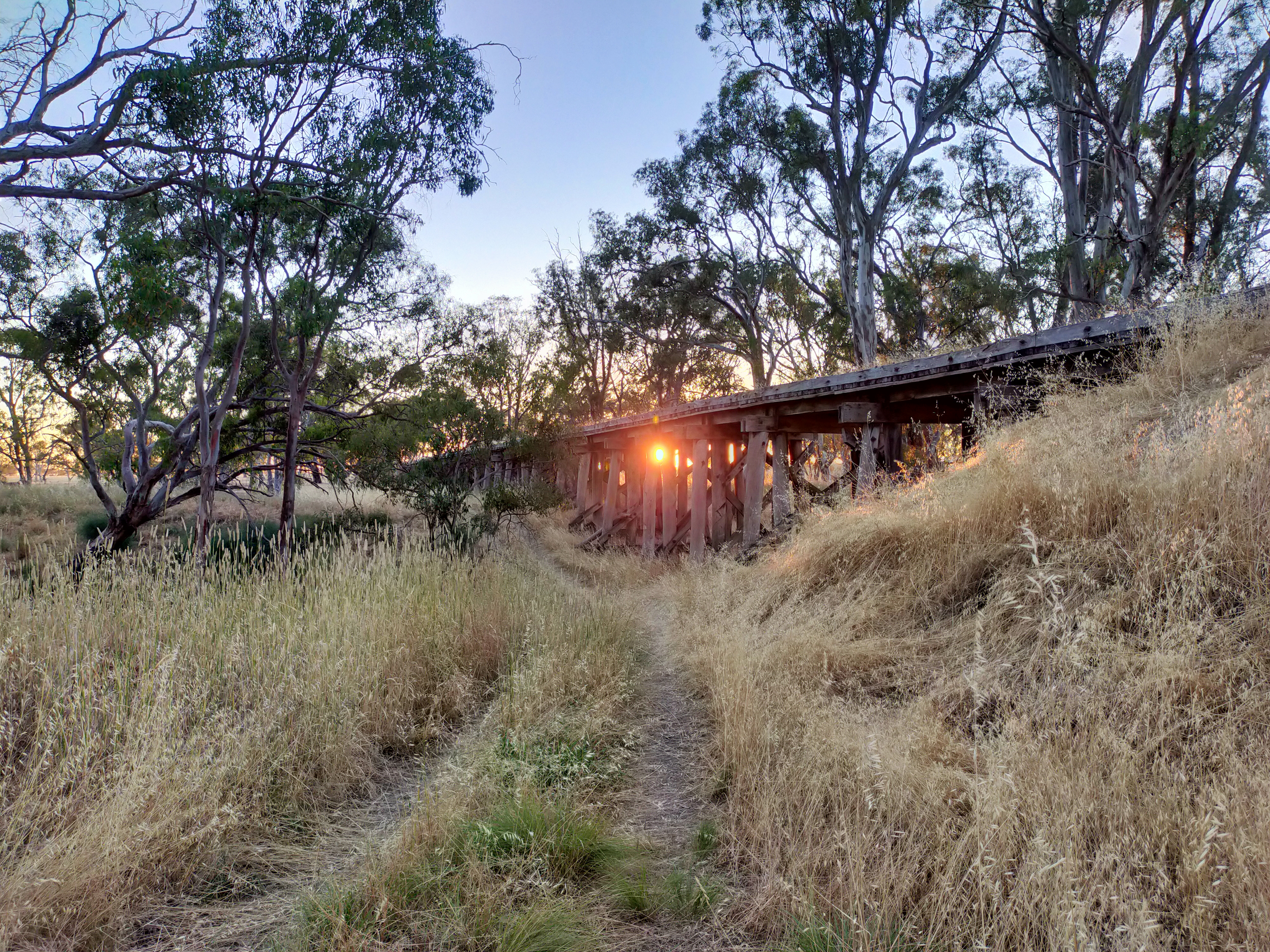
- Rail bridge over the Wimmera River, 2021

Overview
- Status: Closed, track removed
- Termini: Horsham; Carpolac
- Stations: 11

History
- Opened: August 1887
- Closed: 8 December 1986

The Carpolac railway line was located in the Wimmera region of Victoria and branched off of the Serviceton railway line at Horsham railway station, Victoria. It was opened in stages between 1887 and 1927, and was closed from East Natimuk to Carpolac on 8 December 1986.

== Stations ==
The line branched from the Serviceton railway line at Horsham station

Remlaw Siding

Vectis

Quantong

East Natimuk junction with the Balmoral railway line

Natimuk

Arapiles

Mitre (formerly St Mary's/Mitre Lake)

Duffholme

Gymbowen

Goroke

Mortat

Carpolac

== History ==
The line was opened in stages from Horsham to East Natimuk in August 1887, from East Natimuk to Goroke in July 1894, and from Goroke to Carpolac in 1927. It was closed from East Natimuk to Carpolac on 8 December 1986, although the last train on the line ran in February 1986.

In 1910, the railway line at Mitre (formerly St Mary's then known as Mitre Lake) was flooded due to it running at a low elevation through the Mitre Swamp. That resulted in services being suspended beyond Mitre. A deviation around the swamp was constructed a short time later. The original line was dismantled and the rail reservation became the main road to Goroke.

Beginning in 1937 and lasting until April 1965, there was a daily mail/passenger train between Horsham/Carpolac. Sometime during the line's life, there was also a daily goods train.

During the 1968–69 grain harvest, the line saw a record number of trains, with up to 10 a day. Over the period of the grain harvest, 17,325 wagons of grain were transported along the line as it was transported entirely by rail.
