= Portland railway station, Victoria =

Former railway stations in Victoria, Australia

Coordinates: 38°20′57″S 141°36′29″E

Portland

General information
- Owner: VicTrack
- Line: Portland
- Platforms: 1
- Tracks: 4

Other information
- Status: Closed

History
- Opened: 19 December 1877: north station, named Portland. 26 May 1883: line extended to Pier station, later renamed Portland
- Closed: 1968: old Portland station. 1981: new Portland station

Services
Preceding station	Disused railways	Following station
Heywood	Portland line	Terminus
	List of closed railway stations in Victoria	
Location

There have been two railway stations in the town of Portland, Victoria, Australia.

== History ==
The original station, located north of the town centre, remained the principal station even after an extension to Pier station on the waterfront was opened on 26 May 1883. From 1 March 1897, the original station was renamed Portland North while the 1883 station became plain Portland, until it closed on 6 May 1968. At the same time, the northern site, which had been rebuilt with a modern passenger building, once again became the sole station and goods yard. The change was due to alterations to rail facilities as part of the modernization of the Port of Portland.

The last passenger train between Ararat and Portland ran on 12 September 1981 and was operated by a DRC railcar.

All signals at the closed Portland station were removed in 1986. The signal panel, previously located at the Portland Harbour Junction, was relocated to the depot building during that time.
