= Goroke railway station =

Former railway station in Australia

Coordinates: 36°43′21.6″S 141°28′27.4″E

Goroke

General information
- Location: Australia
- Owner: VicTrack
- Line: Carpolac

Other information
- Status: Demolished

History
- Opened: July 1894
- Closed: 8 December 1986

Services
Preceding station	Disused railways	Following station
Gymbowen	Carpolac line	Mortat
	List of closed railway stations in Victoria	
Location

Goroke railway station was a railway station on the Carpolac railway line located in the town of Goroke, Victoria. It was opened in July 1894 when the line from East Natimuk was extended to Goroke. Goroke remained the passenger terminus until 1927 when the line was extended to Carpolac railway station and some passenger services were extended to Mortat. The station had a goods shed and a short passenger platform, there were also a number of Grain Silos located near the station as Goroke was a major grain pickup location. Despite the line being extended to Carpolac railway station, most passenger services still terminated at Goroke with some services continuing to Mortat. There was also a passenger and mail train in regular operation between Horsham railway station, Victoria and Goroke between 1937 and 1941.
