= Regional Rail Logistics =

Freight services

Regional Rail Logistics was a rail freight operator based in New South Wales, Australia. They operated containerised freight services three days a week between the Riverina towns of Junee and Cootamundra to Port Botany in Sydney, using rolling stock of Melbourne rail operator El Zorro.

The first RRL train ran on 18 December 2008 from Junee with 25 wagons. The service is 40 to 45 percent cheaper compared to transport via road, and 20 jobs were created in the towns. The train was the first local freight train to serve the Riverina since 2002, with exporters having to ship by road, or have their loading attached to interstate trains running through the region. The company planned to expand to serve Bomen in early 2009 and discussions were in place for a Griffith service.

The company is no longer in operation.
