= Portland railway line =

Railway line in Victoria, Australia

Overview
- Locale: Victoria, Australia
- Termini: Maroona; Portland railway station

Service
- Type: freight
- Operator: ARTC

History
- Opened: 1877
- Converted to Standard Gauge: 1995

Technical
- Track gauge: 1,435 mm (4 ft 8 1/2 in)
- Old gauge: 1,600 mm (5 ft 3 in)
- Operating speed: 40 km/h (25 mph)
- Signalling: Train Order Working

The Portland railway line is a railway line in south-western Victoria, Australia. It runs from the main Western standard gauge line at Maroona through Hamilton to the port town of Portland.

== History ==
The line was built as 1,600 mm (5 ft 3 in) (broad gauge) from Ararat to Maroona, Hamilton, Heywood and Portland, and opened in 1877. It was converted to standard gauge in 1995.

Freight operator Pacific National indefinitely suspended all rail services to Portland in 2004, affecting local companies including Portland Aluminium, transport company Kalari, and freight broker Anchor Logistics. Portland container traffic had been conveyed between Maroona and Portland on grain services twice a week, but Pacific National said that the drought meant there were no trains to attach the loading to. On the route the price differential between rail and road was $12.97 per tonne in rail's favour. Pacific National closed their Portland operations in March 2008, with GrainCorp leasing a limited number of locomotives and rolling stock from them, but favour transporting grain to the Port of Geelong instead.

In July 2008, the Victorian Government announced a $15 million upgrade to the line, raising maximum speeds to 80 kilometres an hour as they were previously. The Australian Rail Track Corporation signed a 50-year lease to manage the line and was to start the upgrade within months. The line was finally transferred from V/Line to the ARTC on 22 March 2009.

In September 2008, it was announced that freight traffic would restart, with operator El Zorro signing a multi-million deal with miner Iluka Resources to carry containerised mineral sands from Portland in the south-west to Melbourne, with Iluka saying rail transport was cheaper than road. The train ran on an irregular basis. In March 2010, the State Government announced a $3.97 million grant for the construction of a rail loading facility alongside the Iluka Resources mineral sand separation plant near the Hamilton railway station for the rail transport of heavy mineral concentrate extracted from the Iluka mine site at Ouyen via the standard gauge Murtoa - Hopetoun railway.

Grain trains on the line restarted with the 2010 harvest, with AWB Limited and its rail partner El Zorro using the GrainCorp terminal to load 26,250 tonnes of canola bound for Pakistan on 4 March 2010.

== Branch lines ==
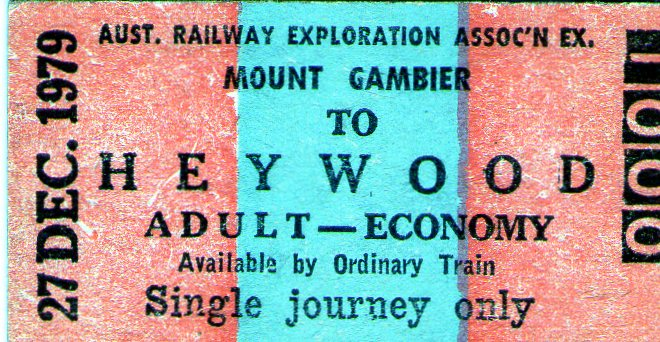
Mt Gambier-Heywood rail ticket 1979

A short lived branch line was opened from Dunkeld to Penshurst in 1890 but closed only eight years later.

A branch line was opened from Hamilton north to Cavendish between 1910 and 1920. This was connected to the Horsham - Balmoral railway in the 1920s, which itself connected back to the main Serviceton line. This line was closed south of Noradjuha, (just south of East Natimuk) in 1979.

A branch line from Hamilton north-west to Coleraine was opened in 1882, being closed in 1977.

A branch line was opened between Hamilton and Koroit in the 1890, where it connected to the South West line via Warrnambool, but was closed in 1977.

A branch line was opened from Branxholme north-west to Casterton in 1884. This line was closed in 1977.

A branch line was opened from Heywood west to Mount Gambier in 1917. Service was suspended in 1995 due to the standardisation of the Maroona - Portland line. There are regular calls for the Heywood - Mount Gambier line to be standardised.

== Services ==
The gauge conversion of the Mildura line to standard gauge in 2017/2018 has resulted in the resumption of seasonal grain trains from the Wimmera and Mallee regionals to Portland. Prior to that, the only regular service on the line was the thrice weekly El Zorro containerised mineral sands train from Portland. The last passenger train between Ararat and Portland was on 12 September 1981, operated by a DRC railcar. A new passenger station at Portland had been officially opened on 29 June 1968.
