= El Zorro (railway) =

Defunct Australian railway operator

- Industry: Rail transport
- Founded: 1999
- Defunct: 4 June 2013
- Headquarters: Australia
- Area served: New South Wales; Victoria
- Key people: Ray Evans (Managing Director)
- Revenue: approx. $100M p.a. at peak
- Number of employees: approx. 180 at peak
- Website: www.elzorro.com.au

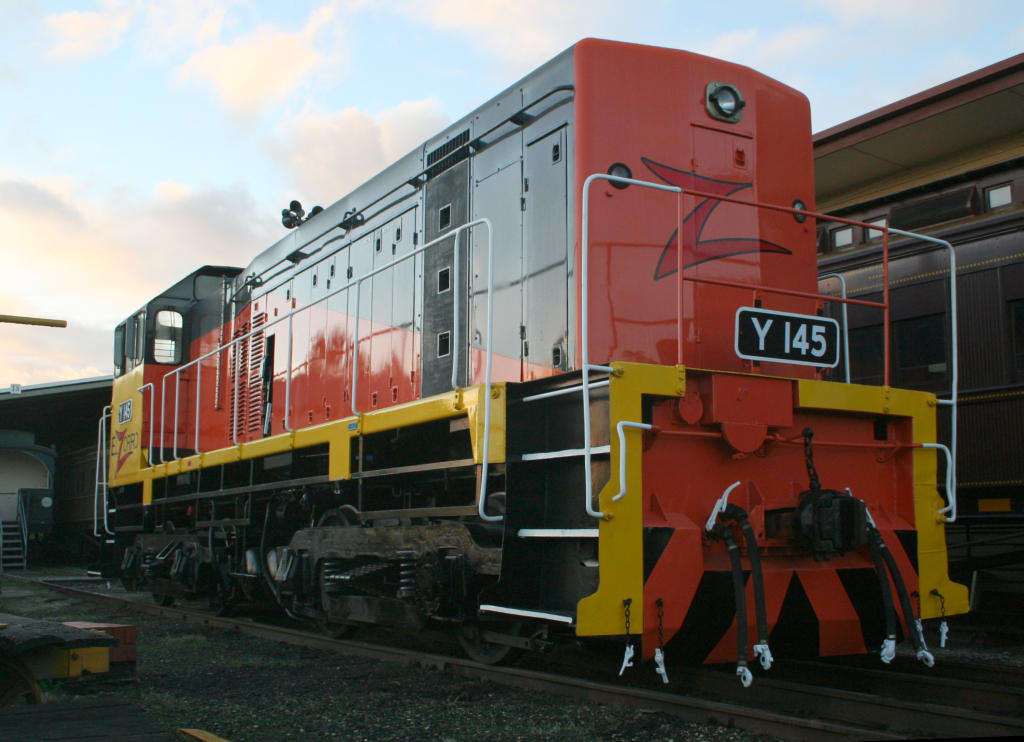
Y145 in El Zorro livery in June 2008

El Zorro was an Australian railway operator hauling freight and infrastructure trains in Victoria and New South Wales.

== History ==
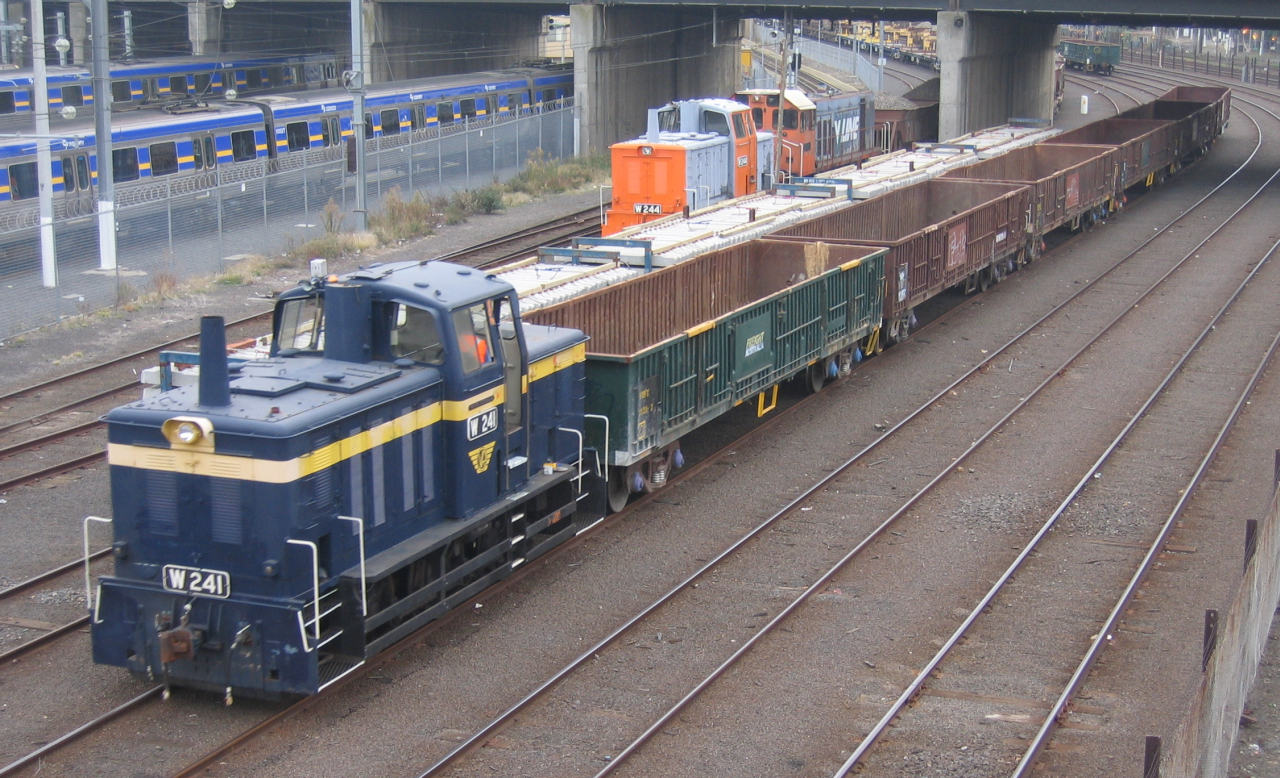
T413 Preservation Group's W241 and W244 and the Railmotor Group's Y168 on infrastructure trains in Melbourne in April 2006

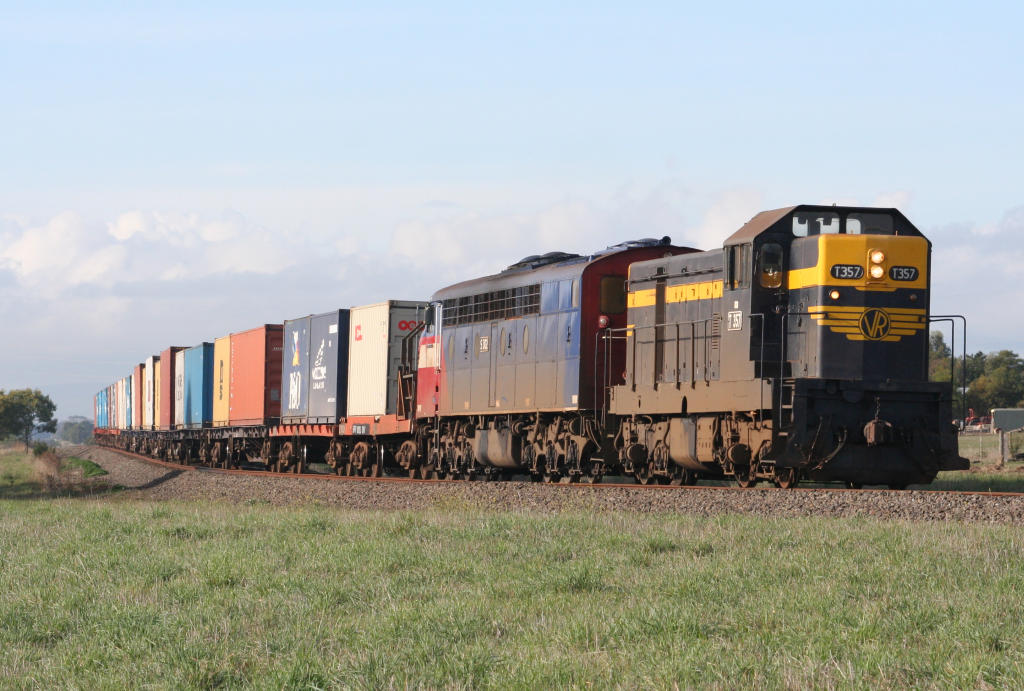
Seymour Railway Heritage Centre's T357 and El Zorro's S302 near Warncoort in June 2008

El Zorro was founded in 1999 by Ray Evans who had a taste for things Spanish, El Zorro being Spanish for the fox. At the time of liquidation, the company had two shareholders: director Ray Evans, and ex-director Lisa Trezise. Geoff Tighe, a co-founder and past shareholder and director, was formerly chief executive of Great Northern Rail Services, a now defunct operator which provided locomotives and crews to other operators in Victoria until November 2002.

In 2004, the company won a contract from QR National subsidiary Interail, to provide crews for its Brisbane to Melbourne rail service on the southern leg from Junee to Melbourne. The company was an accredited rail operator in Victoria and New South Wales operating freight and infrastructure trains.

In December 2006, El Zorro commenced operating a contract for P&O Trans Australia to operate container trains between Melbourne's Swanson Dock and an intermodal container terminal at Somerton.

In August 2007, El Zorro was awarded a contract by AWB to operate two grain trains, one standard gauge, one broad gauge in Victoria and New South Wales.

In December 2007, when Pacific National announced that it was scaling back its Victorian operations, El Zorro who were the only other grain operator, admitted that the logistics of moving an entire Victorian wheat harvest were beyond its capabilities at the time, its fleet comprising only two T class locomotives and 80 wagons. The first El Zorro grain train was operated on the standard gauge on 11 December 2007, and the first broad gauge grain train on 18 January 2008.

In April 2008, El Zorro took over the Westvic Container Handling Warrnambool to Melbourne container service from Pacific National before it returned to Pacific National in October 2008. Problems El Zorro faced in running the service included a lack of broad gauge locomotives and container wagons, the removal of crossing loops on the line by infrastructure manager V/Line, which resulted in late running and delays, and the inability to carry high cube containers though the Geelong tunnel due to a lack of low platform wagons.

In August 2008, AWB awarded El Zorro a new five-year contract to operate four trains moving grain throughout Victoria and New South Wales. To operate these 84 WGBY standard gauge wagons were purchased by AWB Limited from China for this work and delivered in 2009. These were followed by 90 WGSY wagons in 2010 for both standard and broad gauge use.

In September 2008, miner Iluka Resources awarded El Zorro a contract to haul containerised mineral sands from Portland to Melbourne. Trains would run three times a week carrying 40 containers making up a load of 1,000 tonnes.

In October 2008, the company operated a trial service to the Gippsland Intermodal Freight Terminal outside Morwell, in what was the first train to use the facility in almost three years. El Zorro was said to be in talks with local companies who wanted to utilise rail freight.

In December 2008, El Zorro started supplying rolling stock to Regional Rail Logistics, a New South Wales based freight operator running services from the Riverina region to Sydney.

== Financial difficulties ==
In May 2013, Consolidated Rail Leasing filed a petition in the Supreme Court of New South Wales to wind up El Zorro. El Zorro director Ray Evans said cash flow problems had been caused by agricultural products distributor Cargill refusing to pay his company for work carried out during the previous four weeks. Evans said that although El Zorro owed Cargill $2 million as a long-term debt, there was a repayment plan in place, which was not being fulfilled. Due to this Cargill had recently stopped all payments to the rail operator.

Michael Vines president of the Victorian Goldfields Railway, which leased a locomotive to El Zorro through the Seymour Railway Heritage Centre, said in a newsletter that his organisation had not been paid for nine months for the use of the locomotive.

At the same time, the NSW branch of the Rail Tram and Bus Union said it was talking to legal representatives over El Zorro's failure to pay full superannuation entitlements to its members since February 2013. The Seymour Railway Heritage Centre was reportedly owed more than $1 million in relation to the hiring of the centre's rolling stock to the company.

The company ceased trading on 4 June 2013. The Australian Securities & Investments Commission listed El Zorro Transport Pty Ltd as being under external administration following the submission of documents on 14 June. The company subsequently entered liquidation with the liquidators, HoskingHurst, appointed by the Supreme Court of NSW.

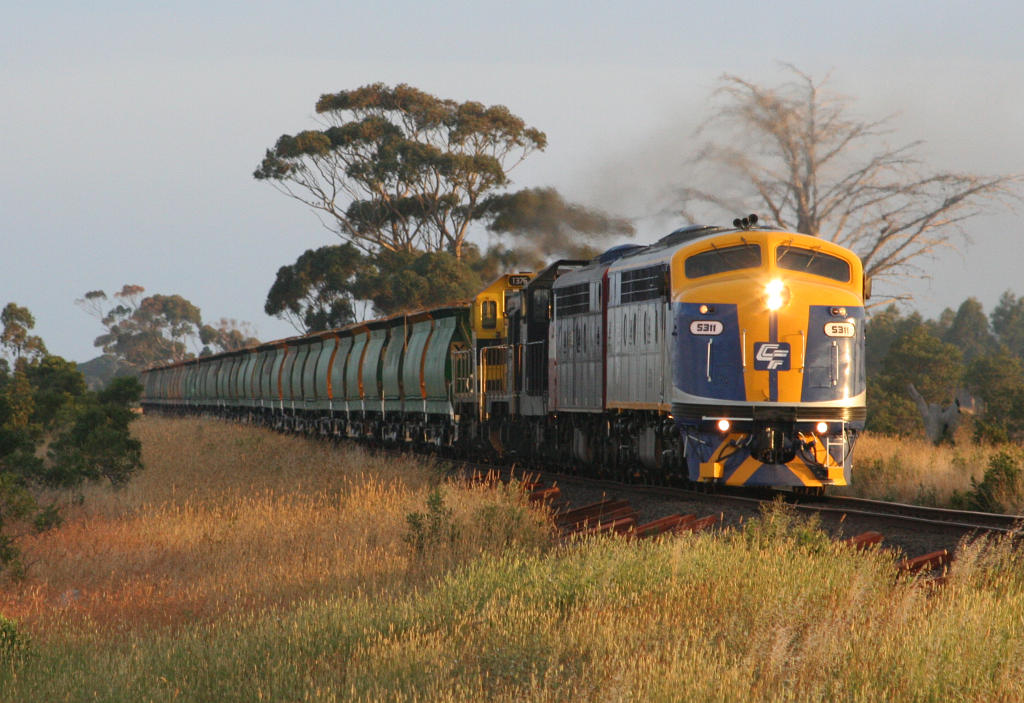
CFCLA's S311 leads a mix of hired and El Zorro locomotives on a broad gauge grain service near Meredith in January 2008

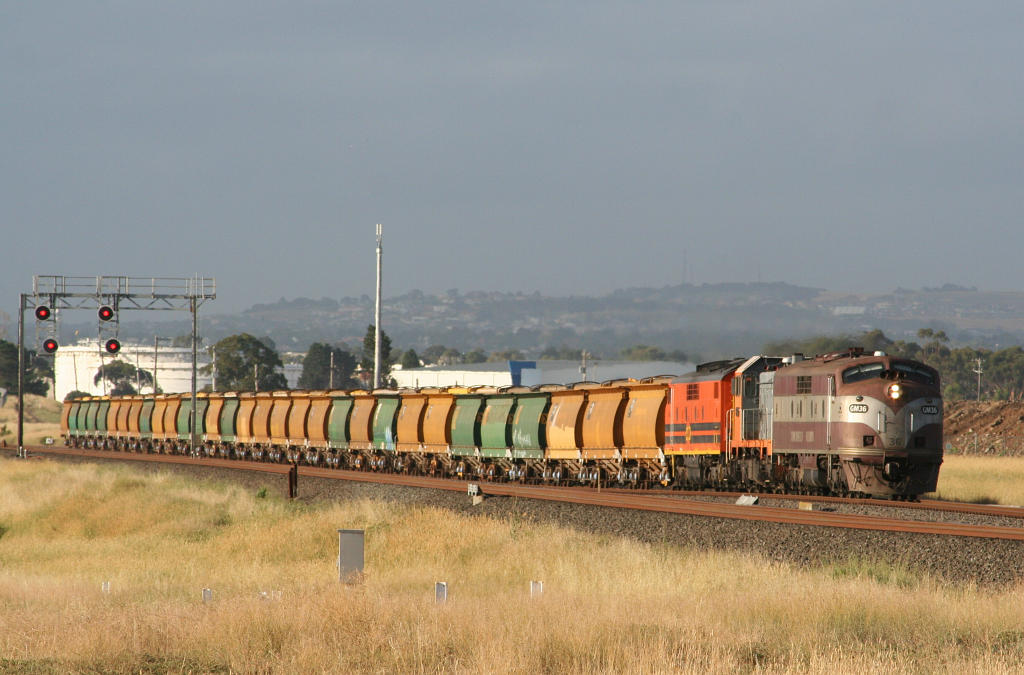
Seymour Railway Heritage Centre's GM36 leads a standard gauge grain service through Corio in January 2008

== Services ==
Services formerly operated by El Zorro included:

- Containerised mineral sands between Portland and Melbourne
- Grain trains for AWB in Victoria and New South Wales
- Infrastructure trains for V/Line

== Fleet ==
Locomotives accredited to be operated by El Zorro on hire from others as at December 2012 included those owned by Australian Locolease, AWB, CFCLA, Consolidated Rail Leasing, Genesee & Wyoming, Greentrains, Junee Railway Workshop and SCT Logistics as well as various preservation organisations including 707 Operations, Diesel Electric Rail Motor Preservation Association of Victoria, Seymour Railway Heritage Centre, South Gippsland Railway, Steamrail Victoria and Victorian Goldfields Railway. They also included locomotives owned by RLG, a related entity of El Zorro which included: S302, T386 and Y145.

T386 was the first locomotive to receive any El Zorro branding, receiving a Z painted on the end of each hood. In May 2008, Y145 was the first locomotive to be painted into El Zorro's grey, orange and yellow livery. In January 2009, South Gippsland Railway's T342 was painted in El Zorro livery after being hired on a long lease. In August 2009, S302 was also repainted in to the corporate livery.

El Zorro made approaches to acquire unwanted rolling stock from competitor Pacific National, but were told that rolling stock would be scrapped or exported.

Wagons included container flats, open wagons, rail transporters, and ballast hoppers. Grain hoppers, sleeper discharge wagons, container flats, and ballast hoppers were also leased by the company.
