= Maroona railway station =

Former railway station in Victoria, Australia

Coordinates: 37°26′24″S 142°51′35″E

Maroona

General information
- Line: Portland
- Platforms: 1
- Tracks: 1

Other information
- Status: Closed

History
- Opened: 24 Apr 1877
- Closed: 1980s

Services
Preceding station	Disused railways	Following station
From Gheringhap and Geelong	Western standard gauge line	Ararat
Junction	Portland line	Hamilton
	List of closed railway stations in Victoria	
Location

Maroona is the junction station between what is the main western railway line and the branch line to Portland, Victoria, Australia. A number of sidings are provided at this station which are still in use. The platform and station building remain at Maroona with track access still available to one side of the platform.
