= VicTrack =

Government owned company in Victoria, Australia

Victorian Rail Track (VicTrack)

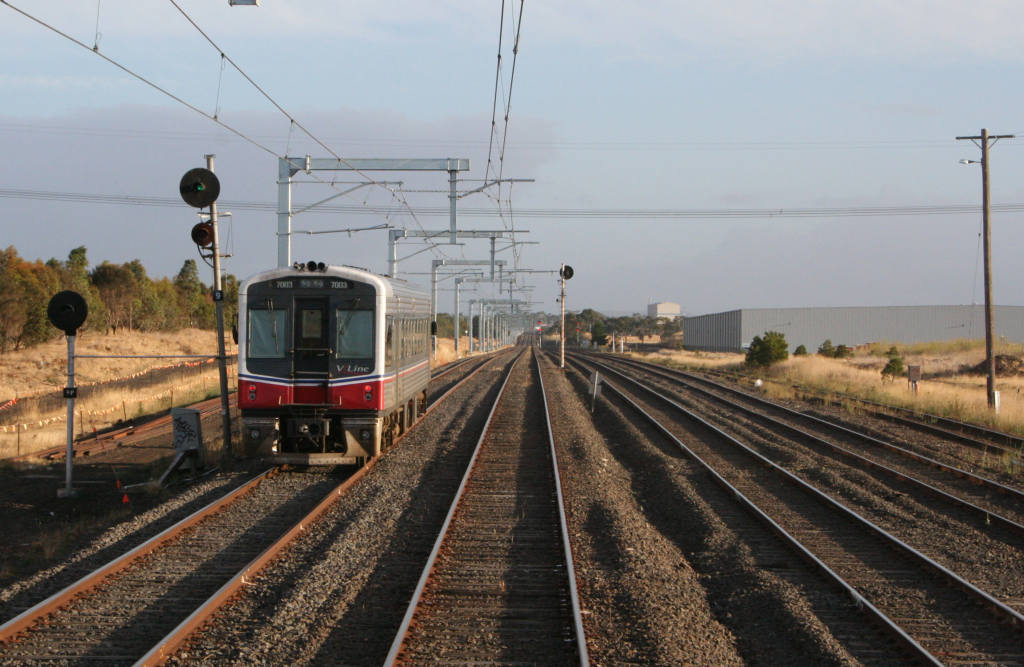
- VicTrack assets at Roxburgh Park: V/Line-operated Sprinter train on Metro Trains Melbourne-leased Craigieburn line to the left, and Australian Rail Track Corporation-leased North East line to the right, 2007

Corporation overview
- Formed: 1 July 1997
- Preceding corporation: Public Transport Corporation
- Type: Statutory corporation
- Jurisdiction: Victoria
- Headquarters: Docklands
- Employees: 387 (June 2018)
- Minister responsible: Vicki Ward, Minister for Public Transport
- Corporation executive: Jonathan Metcalfe, Chief Executive
- Parent department: Department of Transport and Planning
- Key documents: Victorian Rail Corporations Act 1996; Transport Integration Act 2010
- Website: www.victrack.com.au
- Agency ID: PROV VA 4616

VicTrack, the trading name of the Victorian Rail Track Corporation, is a business enterprise of the Victorian Government which owns all railway and tram lines, associated rail lands, track corridors and other infrastructure in the state of Victoria, Australia, with the exception of the Puffing Billy Railway, which is owned and run by the Puffing Billy Railway Board.

VicTrack leases railway and tram land used for public transport to Public Transport Victoria which then sub-leases the assets and infrastructure to rail and tram operators, currently Australian Rail Track Corporation (ARTC), Metro Trains Melbourne, V/Line and Yarra Trams. VicTrack retains responsibility for the freight lines around the Dynon Intermodal Freight Terminal, South Dynon Locomotive Depot and in North Melbourne.

VicTrack also carries out a range of commercial activities on railway land, including:

- property leasing and licensing of surplus railway land
- providing telecommunications services using surplus railway network capacity
- outdoor advertising
- commercial property development
- environmental programs on railway lands such as remediation of contaminated land.

== Objective ==
The Transport Integration Act 2010 provides that VicTrack's primary object is "to act as the custodial owner of the State's transport-related land, infrastructure and assets" consistent with the vision statement in the Act, and objectives which emphasise transport integration and sustainability. The Act also states that VicTrack's activities should be primarily directed at supporting the transport system and other purposes which support Government policy.

== History ==
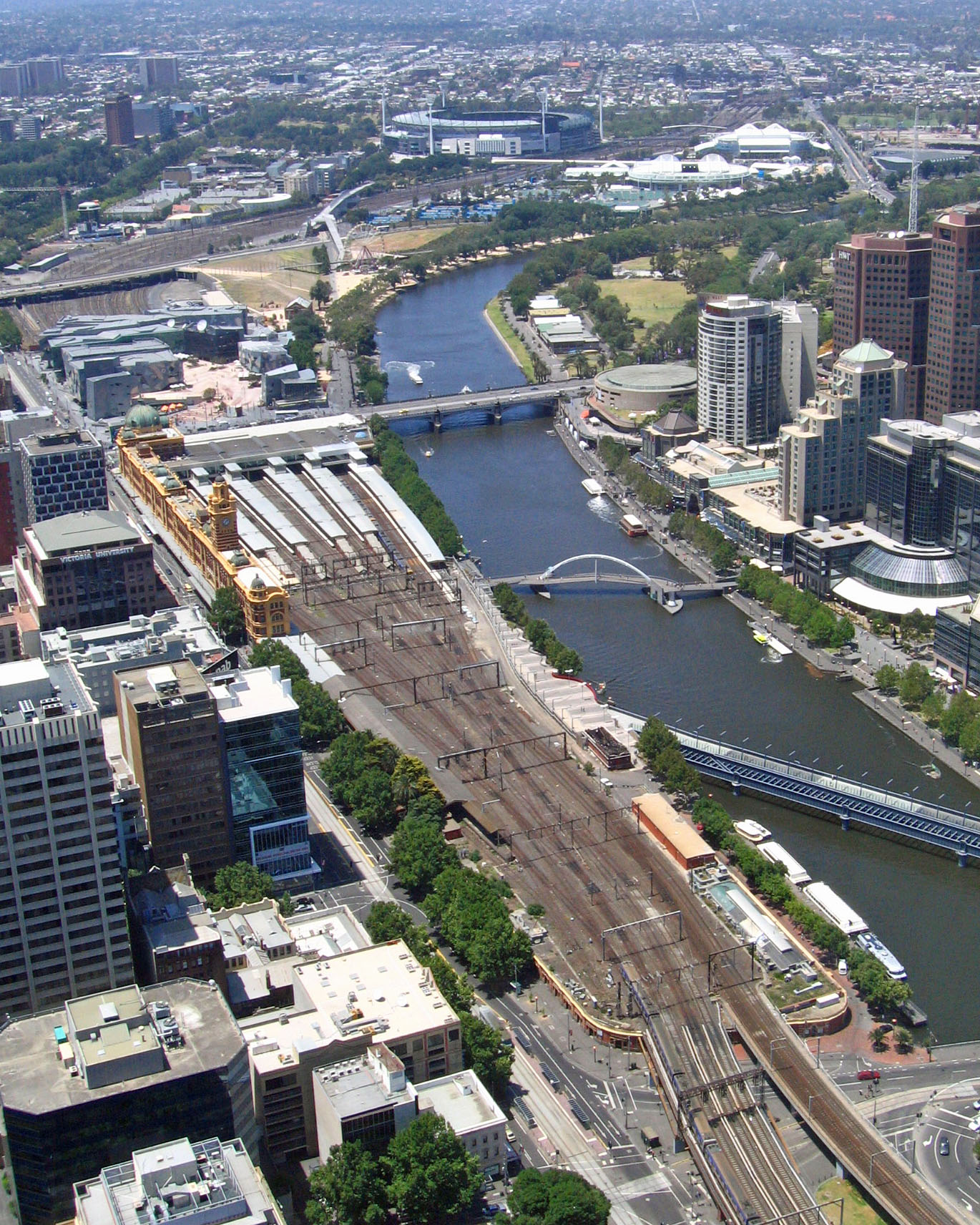
Western approach to Flinders Street station, 2008

Victorian Rail Track was established on 1 July 1997, under the Rail Corporations Act 1996, to hold, manage and maintain railway land and infrastructure in Victoria for the Victorian Government.

In 1999, the standard gauge tracks from Melbourne to Serviceton (near the South Australian border) and to Albury (on the New South Wales border) were leased for five years to the newly formed Australian Rail Track Corporation. This was later extended for another 10 years and in May 2008, for another 45 years.

As part of the extension, the rundown and underutilised broad gauge line from Seymour to Albury that paralleled the Melbourne to Sydney line, was converted to standard gauge. Included was construction of a five kilometre Wodonga Rail Bypass to eliminate 11 level crossings.

In May 1999, a 45-year lease on the regional network was sold to Freight Victoria. The lease was included in the sale of the business to Pacific National in August 2004, before being bought back by the State Government in 2007.

In July 2008, the line from Maroona to Portland was leased to the ARTC for 50 years with $15 million to be invested in the line. The line was handed over in March 2009.

== Director of Public Transport ==
In August 1999, the office of Director of Public Transport was created in the Department of Transport to manage, coordinate and regulate public transport in Victoria. The responsibilities of the Director included the entering into and management of franchising contracts with train, tram and bus companies to provide public transport services in Melbourne and Victoria. To further these goals, the Director leased the metropolitan and intrastate train and tram infrastructure and assets from VicTrack through the Metropolitan Infrastructure Head Lease, and would sub-lease various assets to the various franchisees through Infrastructure Leases. On 2 April 2012, these functions of the Director were transferred to the newly created Public Transport Victoria, as were the leases.

The Victorian Rail Track Corporation (VicTrack) was re-established with a new corporate charter from 1 July 2010 by the Transport Integration Act 2010. The 2010 Act also changed the name of the Rail Corporations Act 1996 to the Rail Management Act 1996.

== Relationship with Public Transport Victoria ==
VicTrack is the custodian of all rail infrastructure and assets in Victoria. VicTrack leases the metropolitan and intrastate train and tram infrastructure and assets to Public Transport Victoria (PTV), which then sub-leases the infrastructure and assets to the metropolitan train and tram operators and V/Line. PTV manages the rights and obligations contained in the sub-leases on behalf of the State.

Metro Trains Melbourne operates Melbourne's railway network of 998 km (620 mi) of track and is responsible for 222 railway stations. V/Line operates to 91 railway stations and is track manager of the Victorian intrastate rail network outside of the ARTC and Metro Trains Melbourne sub-leases. Yarra Trams operates the 250 km (160 mi) Melbourne tram network. ARTC sub-leases from PTV the interstate standard gauge railway tracks from Melbourne to Serviceton and Melbourne to Albury.

== See also ==
- List of Victorian government agencies
