= NS 500 =

NS 500 may refer to:

- Apple Network Server 500-series (Apple NS 500)
- English Electric NS 500 Class locomotive
- Honda NS500, a 500cc motorcycle grand prix race bike
- NanoSight NS500 microscope
- Yamaha NS-500 speakers; see List of Yamaha Corporation products

== See also ==
- NS 5000 (disambiguation)
- NS50 (disambiguation)
- 500 (disambiguation)
- NS (disambiguation)
