= Victorian Railways F class (diesel) =

Class of diesel locomotives used in Australia

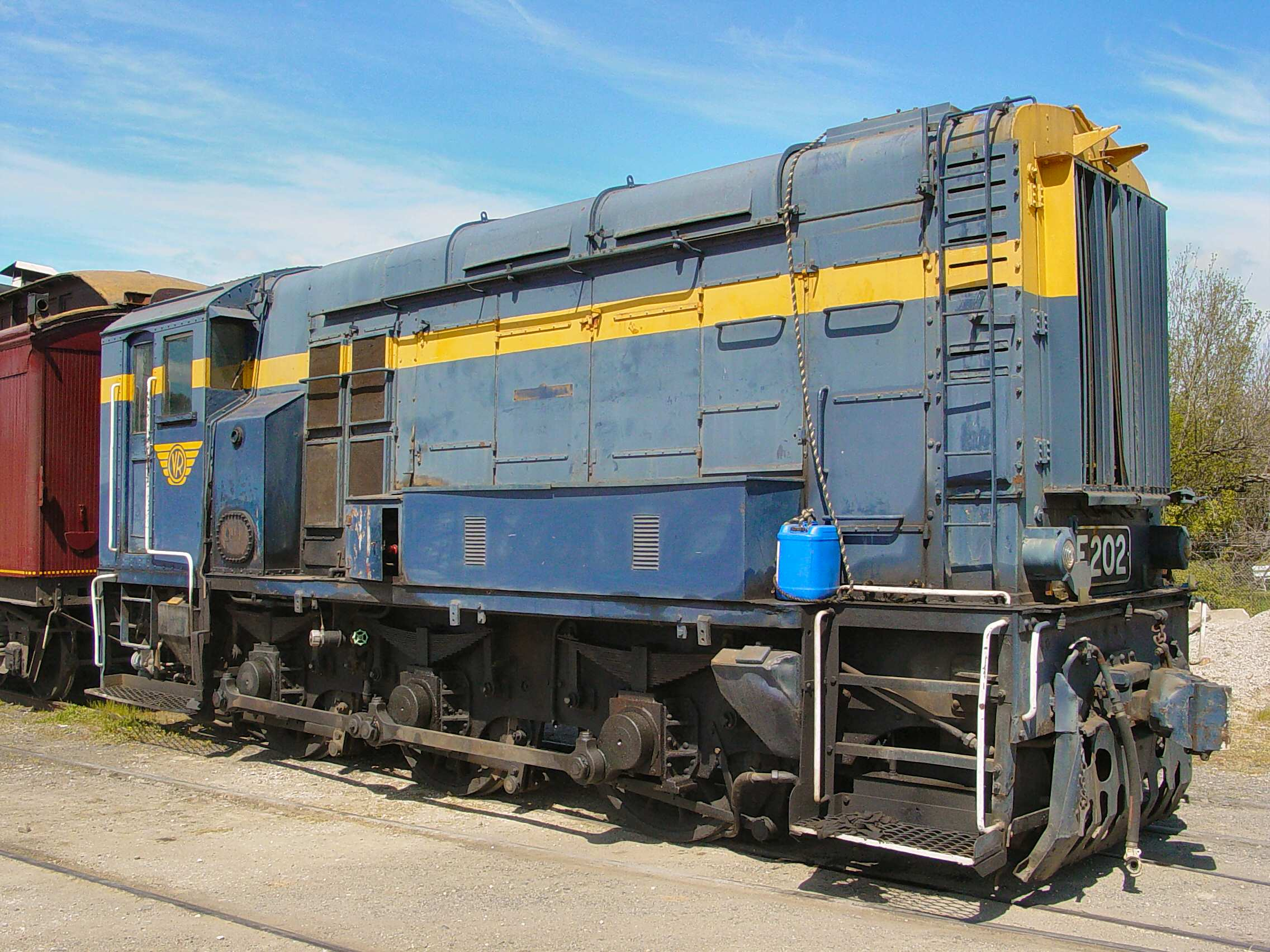
- Preserved F202 at the Seymour Railway Heritage Centre in October 2005
Type and origin
- Power type: Diesel-electric
- Builder: English Electric
- Build date: 1951–1953
- Total produced: 16
Specifications
- Configuration
  - UIC: C
- Gauge: 1,600 mm (5 ft 3 in)
- Length: 9.34 m (30 ft 8 in)
- Fuel type: Diesel
- Prime mover: English Electric 6KT
- Generator: English Electric 801-66
- Traction motors: English Electric 506A
Performance figures
- Maximum speed: 20 mph (32 km/h)
- Power output: 350 hp (261 kW)
Career
- Operators: Victorian Railways
- Number in class: 16
- Numbers: F201-F216 (renumbered), F310-F319 (original)
- First run: 1951
- Preserved: F202, F204, F208, F211, F212, F216
- Disposition: 6 preserved, remainder scrapped

The F Class are a class of diesel-electric shunting locomotives built by English Electric for the Victorian Railways (VR) between 1951 and 1953. They are similar to the British Rail Class 11 and NS Class 600 shunting locomotives also built by English Electric during this period, modified for use on the VR's 1600 mm (5 ft 3 in) broad gauge network.

== History ==
The F Class were ordered by the Victorian Railways as part of Operation Phoenix, an £80 million program to rebuild a network badly run down by years of Depression-era under-investment and wartime over-utilisation.

The Victorian Railways purchased ten 0-6-0 diesel-electric shunting locomotives in 1951 from English Electric (EE). The locomotives were built at the company's Dick, Kerr Works at Preston, UK, and entered service from October 1951 onwards. The design is similar to that of the standard-gauge British Rail Class 11 and Nederlandse Spoorwegen 600 class locomotives, which were also being built by EE at this time.

Six identical units were purchased by the State Electricity Commission of Victoria in 1952, for shunting at their Newport, Morwell and Yallourn power plants. The SEC later sold all six units to VR; the first, SEC3 in 1957, three more – SEC4, 5 and 6 – in 1959 (retaining their SEC numbers for about a year), and the remaining two, the former SEC1 and SEC2, in May 1971. These locomotives received numbers in the 21x-series as F212-216 on entry to VR service.

SEC locomotives 1 and 2 were delivered from Newport Power Station to South Dynon in mid May-1971, and immediately entered the workshops for modifications to the brake systems and cab controls. They were renumbered on 24 May, with F215 entering service on 27 May and F216 on 1 June. The former was immediately transferred to Wodonga (behind S300) and the latter to Benalla, each to act as local yard pilots. Between these and the transfer of F212 to Wodonga on June 9, three Y Class locomotives were released for other duties.

=== Design ===
Unlike their British and Dutch counterparts, the F class locomotives were also later fitted with sideplates covering the side rods and wheel cranks. This modification was made to prevent staff from being injured by the rods and cranks.

All engines were converted from transition screw couplings and side buffers to automatic couplers after 1 January 1954.

In 1959 the Victorian Railways constructed two home-grown diesel shunting engines, the M Class, using the same wheelsets as the F Class engines.

By August 1960 three locomotives, F210, F211 and additional F207, were the dedicated yard pilots at Spencer Street station, and these retained their original dual automatic and screw couplers, with semicircle buffers cut off at the top to avoid locking into carriage diaphragm plates.

=== Renumbering ===
As built the locomotives were originally numbered in the 300-series as F310-319; at the time the S Class steam locomotives were numbered 300-303, and the E Class steam shunting locomotives started from 350. The S Class steam locomotives were scrapped shortly thereafter, and the number blocks either side recycled for the S class diesel locomotives numbered 300-309, and the T class diesel locomotives starting from 320. This caused a problem later, when the Victorian Railways placed a second order for another eight S class locomotives for use on the new North East standard gauge line which were delivered starting in November 1960.

In order to vacate the 300-series numbers for the new mainline diesels, all F class locomotives were renumbered into the 200-series on in late May 1958 as F201-210. SEC3 followed as F211 in mid-June, though SEC4, 5 and 6 could not yet be renumbered because at this time they were still technically owned by the State Electricity Commission.

By the second half of May 1958, engines 312-316, 318-319 had received new numbers, while on 25 May that year, F310 and SEC3-6 were still using their original numbers. The status of 311/202 and 317/208 were not specified. All engines were numbered in the 201-214 block by December 1959.

The Victorian Railways had purchased S.E.C engines 4, 5 and 6 in April 1959, having had them on hire since April 1953. They were renumbered on 9 August 1959.

== In Service ==
Within a few months of entering service, the first ten F Class engines had reportedly clocked up over 20,000 hours of use, initially in the Melbourne yard and wharf areas. The engines were primarily allocated to Dynon, Geelong and Wodonga, and later to South Dynon and Newport Workshops

On Saturday 7 June 1958, SEC 4, 5 and 6 were sighted at North Melbourne locomotive depot along with F Class engines 201, 203, 205, 206 and 208.

=== Liveries ===
The engines were delivered painted all-over black with red pilots, but within a few years they were repainted red with a thin yellow stripe. Some engines received thicker yellow stripes covering about a third of the cabside window height, and F208 is presently preserved in this livery, having been repainted sometime after 1999. The class started to be repainted to Victorian Railways blue from 1964. The SEC locomotives started in green, and SEC 2 has been preserved in that livery; in 1967 SEC 2 was sighted in dark blue with yellow stripes across the body and footplate. SEC 1, later F215, had been repainted to Victorian Railways' blue and gold between 1975-1978, but there is no evidence that F216 (ex SEC 2) was repainted to the Victorian Railways scheme, as it was still in the SEC livery in 1987 and stamped for preservation.

A photo of SEC 4 (later F212) on 21 March 1959 shows the engine in a dark livery with thick lighter stripe, and no cabside logos. Between the lack of logos and the presence of the thick stripe, this is most likely the VR red scheme, rather than an SEC blue scheme. This may indicate that the four SEC engines leased by the VR were treated as part of that fleet from early on; they may never have worn SEC colours.

By August 1984, F208 had been painted with green couplers, a red underframe and cab roof, and named "Dynon Donk". F212 was notable at the time for retaining the VR logo on the cabsides, where other engines had them painted over in the intervening years. Cabside photos of F214 in photos from 1978, and F201 in 1982, show the VR logos missing.

On 6 October 1985, F211 was sighted at South Dynon undergoing final touch-ups to its new coat of V/Line colours. At the same time F208 was noted as the regular shunter for South Dynon depot, explaining the unofficial "Dynon Donk" name plates either side of the hood and on the rear of the cab.

In preservation, F212 has operated in VR blue and yellow with red additions similar to those applied to F208 in its final years of service, plus red coupling rods made visible by removal of the sideboards.

== Withdrawal ==
Withdrawal of the F class locomotives began in October 1979 with the withdrawal of F214; it and F206 and F210 were scrapped in June 1981. The remaining locomotives with withdrawn between November 1979 and July 1987, when the last three locomotives, F202, F208, and F216, were taken out of service. Following withdrawal, the locomotives appear to have been placed in storage, and most were later scrapped. Only one locomotive was broken up in the same year it was withdrawn; F215 was withdrawn in April 1983 and scrapped later that year.

F201 and F211 were stored out of service by mid-February 1987. On 17 May 1987 none of the F class remained in V/Line service. At that time, F201 was stored at Cowper Street, F202, 204, 208, 211, 212 and 216 were preserved either static, stored or in service, and all other engines had been cut up at Newport Workshops. The last to be scrapped was F213.

== Preservation ==
Six of the sixteen F class locomotives were purchased from VR or donated for preservation in the early 1980s. All except F212 are owned by VicTrack and allocated to various preservation groups:

- F202, formerly F311, is allocated to the Seymour Railway Heritage Centre until deemed surplus 2017. It was used by SRHC as a shunting locomotive around their depot. It was then reallocated to 707 Operations and was again deemed surplus in 2023 awaiting disposal.
- F204, formerly F313, is in storage at 707 Operations' operational base at Newport Workshops, as a source of spare parts. Alike F202 is awaiting disposal due to being surplus to requirements.
- F208, formerly F317, was known unofficially as the Dynon Donk. It is currently operated by 707 Operations and they have renumbered the engine back to F317. (Has been renumbered back to 208 as of 2023). It is currently preserved-operational and has been restored to a Red with Yellow stripe livery.
- F211, formerly SEC3, is statically displayed at the Newport Railway Museum in V/Line tangerine and grey Livery. It was informally known as Little Trimmer, as shown by the plaques with that name, attached to each side of the cab.
- F212, formerly SEC4, was withdrawn in November 1986 and purchased by the Victorian Goldfields Railway It is preserved-operational.
- F216, formerly SEC2, is statically displayed at the Newport Railway Museum. Unlike F211, it has been painted to resemble its original SEC livery, and bears the number plate SEC2.

== Locomotives ==
Key:	Preserved	Scrapped

Number	Name	Builder's Number	Original number	In service	Renumbered	Out of service	Known deployments	Status	Notes
F201		1754	F310	18 November 1951	26 May 1958	December 1983	South Dynon, April 1983	Scrapped January 1989	
F202	Freddy	1755	F311	6 September 1951	18 May 1958	July 1987	Newport yard pilot, April 1983. Seymour Rail Heritage Centre until 2017; 707 Operations until 2023	VicTrack-owned. Stored, awaiting new allocation	Naming was unofficial. Had been operated by 707 Operations as Newport shunter. Had a major failure, since returned to VicTrack.
F203		1756	F312	23 November 1951	18 May 1958	October 1981		Scrapped 1982	
F204		1757	F313	31 October 1951	18 May 1958	April 1981		Stored	Written off 2 June 1982 (Note: Source says scrapped, but this didn't actually happen.) Owned by VicTrack. Previously allocated to 707 Operations as spare parts for F208, since deemed surplus to requirements.
F205		1758	F314	3 October 1951	25 May 1958	December 1981		Scrapped 1982	
F206		1759	F315	23 September 1951	18 May 1958	January 1981		Scrapped 13 July 1981	
F207		1760	F316	7 October 1951	16 May 1958	December 1981		Scrapped	
F208	Dynon Donk	1761	F317	2 December 1951	18 May 1958	July 1987	707 Operations; South Dynon, for repairs - April 1983; South Dynon, regular depot shunter	Preserved – Operational	Naming was unofficial. Renumbered back to F317 in preservation. Is back as F208 as of 2023.
F209		1762	F318	27 November 1951	18 May 1958	March 1982		Scrapped 2 June 1982	
F210		1763	F319	16 November 1951	18 May 1958	November 1979		Scrapped 17 June 1981	
F211	Little Trimmer	1808	SEC3	23 March 1953 - SEC 19 May 1957 - VR	15 June 1958	September 1986	Geelong, April 1983; Melbourne Hump Yard, regular "trimmer" shunter	Preserved – static at Newport Railway Museum	Naming was unofficial.
F212		1915	SEC4	15 April 1953 - SEC 14 April 1959 - VR	9 August 1959	November 1986	Victorian Goldfields Railway; Melbourne Hump Yard, 5 May 1985; Geelong, April 1983	Out of traffic – repaint	Leased by VR from SEC, April 1953 to April 1959, then purchased.
F213		1916	SEC5	12 April 1953 - SEC 12 April 1959 - VR	9 August 1959	April 1981		Condemned March 1982, scrapped 2 June 1982	Leased by VR from SEC, April 1953 to April 1959, then purchased.
F214		1917	SEC6	29 April 1953 - SEC 29 April 1959 - VR	9 August 1959	October 1979		Scrapped 13 July 1981	Leased by VR from SEC, April 1953 to April 1959, then purchased.
F215		1806	SEC1	18 January 1952 - SEC 27 May 1971 - VR	24 May 1971 - Renumbered 27 May 1971 - In service	April 1983	At South Dynon pending scrapping, April 1983	Condemned May 1983	
F216		1807	SEC2	29 January 1952 - SEC 27 May 1971 - VR	24 May 1971 - Renumbered 27 May 1971 - In service 1 June 1971 - First used	July 1987	Newport Railway Museum; Newport yard pilot, April 1983	Preserved – static	Renumbered back to SEC2 in preservation. Probably never painted Victorian Railways' blue.

Note: Newsrail April 1983 lists different renumbering dates for SEC 1, 2 and 3. Dates listed above are from sources written at the time.
