= NS50 =

NS50, NS 50, NS-50, NS.50, or variation, may refer to:

== Commemorations ==
- NS 50 Years Since Victory (Russian: 50 лет Победы), a Russian celebration of the 50th anniversary of the Soviet victory in WWII
- Singapore 50th anniversary of National Service (NS50) in 2017 in Singapore
  - Singapore National Day Parade, 2017

== Transportation ==
- Lyet Pobyedi (NS 50), a Russian nuclear-powered icebreaker
- Honda NS50, a motorcycle; see List of Honda motorcycles

== Other uses ==
- Waverley-Fall River-Beaver Bank (constituency N.S. 50), Nova Scotia, Canada; a provincial electoral district
- NS 50: short to medium range multi-mission air and surface surveillance radar made by Thales

== See also ==
- NS (disambiguation)
- 50 (disambiguation)
- NS5 (disambiguation)
- NS 500 (disambiguation)
