= NS 5000 =

NS 5000 may refer to:

- NS 5000 (1877), a Dutch train class
- NS 5000 (1946), a Dutch train class taken over from the British War Department

== See also ==
- NS 500 (disambiguation)
