= Victorian Railways Y class (diesel) =

Class of diesel locomotives used in Australia

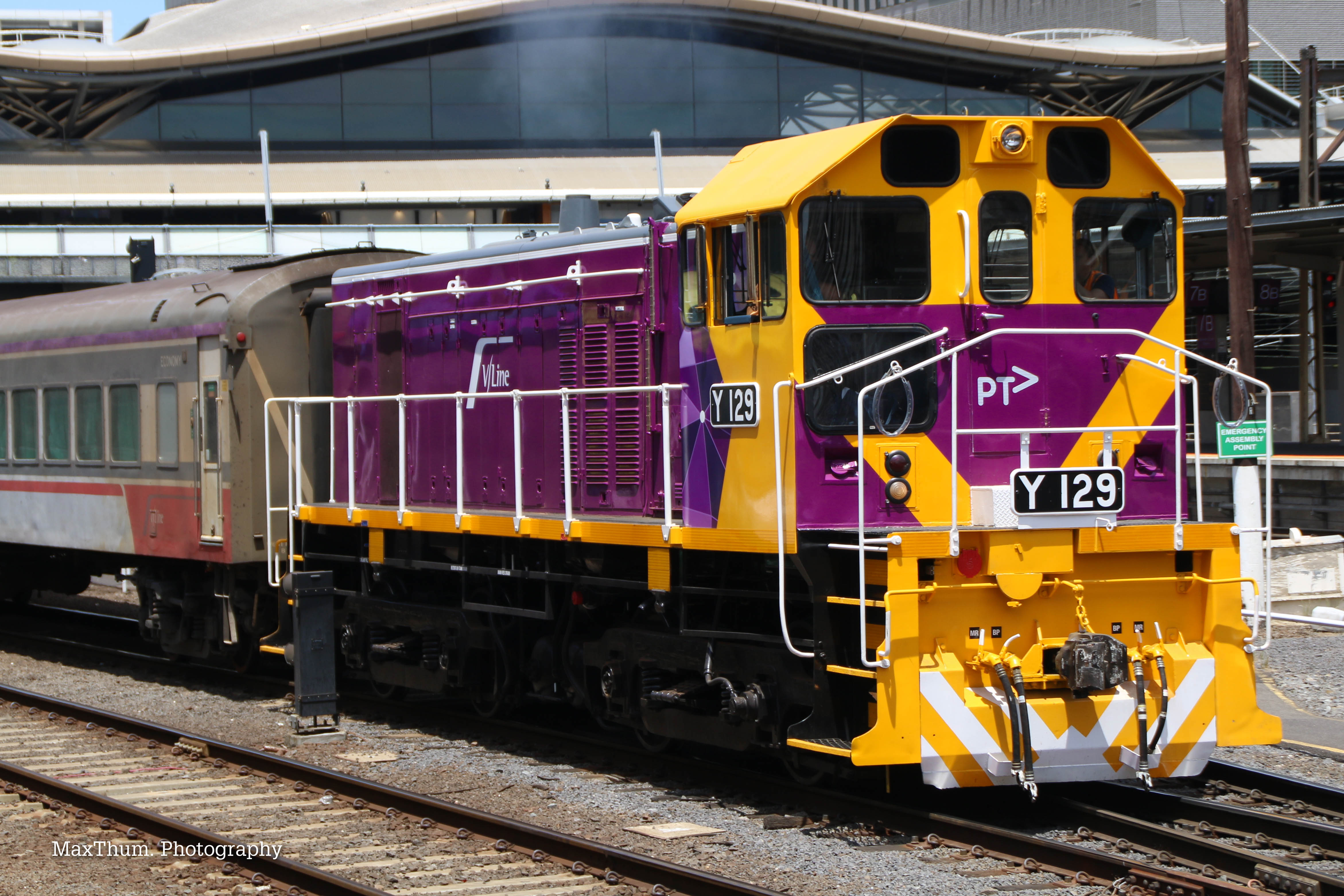
- Y129 in current PTV / V/Line livery at Southern Cross station
Type and origin
- Power type: Diesel-electric
- Builder: Clyde Engineering, Granville
- Model: EMD G6B
- Build date: 1963–1968
- Total produced: 75
Specifications
- Configuration
  - UIC: Bo-Bo
- Gauge: 1,600 mm (5 ft 3 in)
- Length: 13.28 m (43 ft 7 in)
- Loco weight: 65 t
- Fuel type: Diesel
- Prime mover: EMD 6-567C (first 50); EMD 6-645 (last 25)
- Engine type: V6 2-stroke
- Aspiration: Roots-type supercharge
- Generator: EMD D25E
- Traction motors: General Electric 237
Performance figures
- Maximum speed: 65 km/h (40 mph); Y175 upgraded to 95 km/h (59 mph)
- Power output: 480 kW (640 hp)
Career
- Operators: Victorian Railways
- Number in class: 75
- Numbers: Y101–Y175
- First run: 1963
- Current owner: V/Line; Southern Shorthaul Railroad; Newport Railway Museum; Steamrail Victoria; 707 Operations; Seymour Railway Heritage Centre; Ettamogah Rail Hub
- Disposition: 6 in service, 14 preserved, 11 stored, 44 scrapped

The Y class are a class of diesel locomotives built by Clyde Engineering, Granville for the Victorian Railways between 1963 and 1968.

== History ==
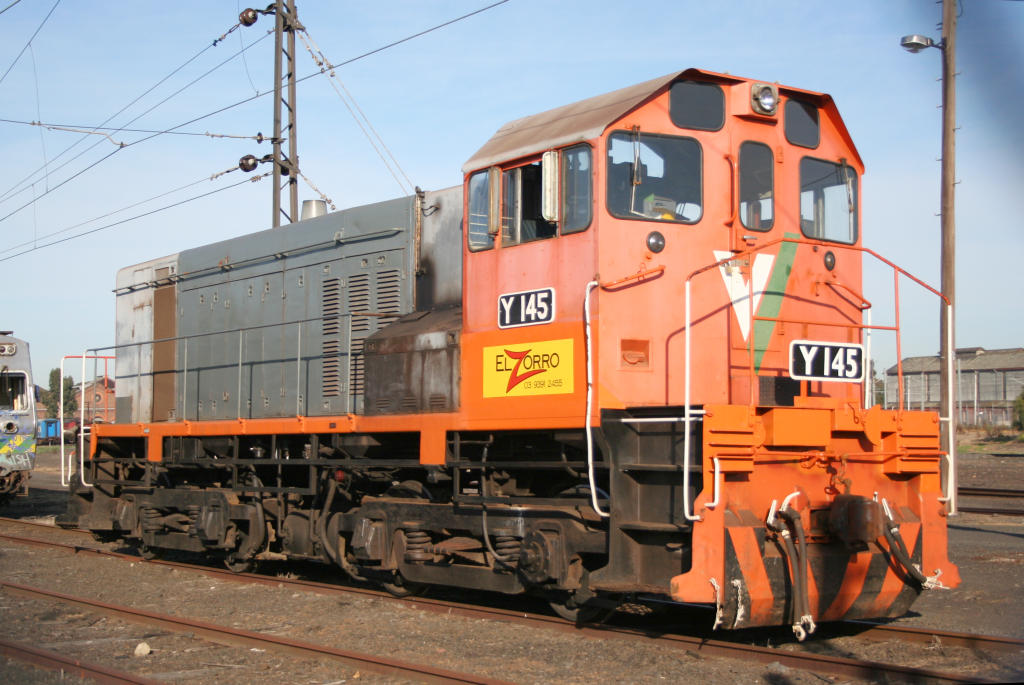
Y109 (as Y145) at Newport Workshops in 2006

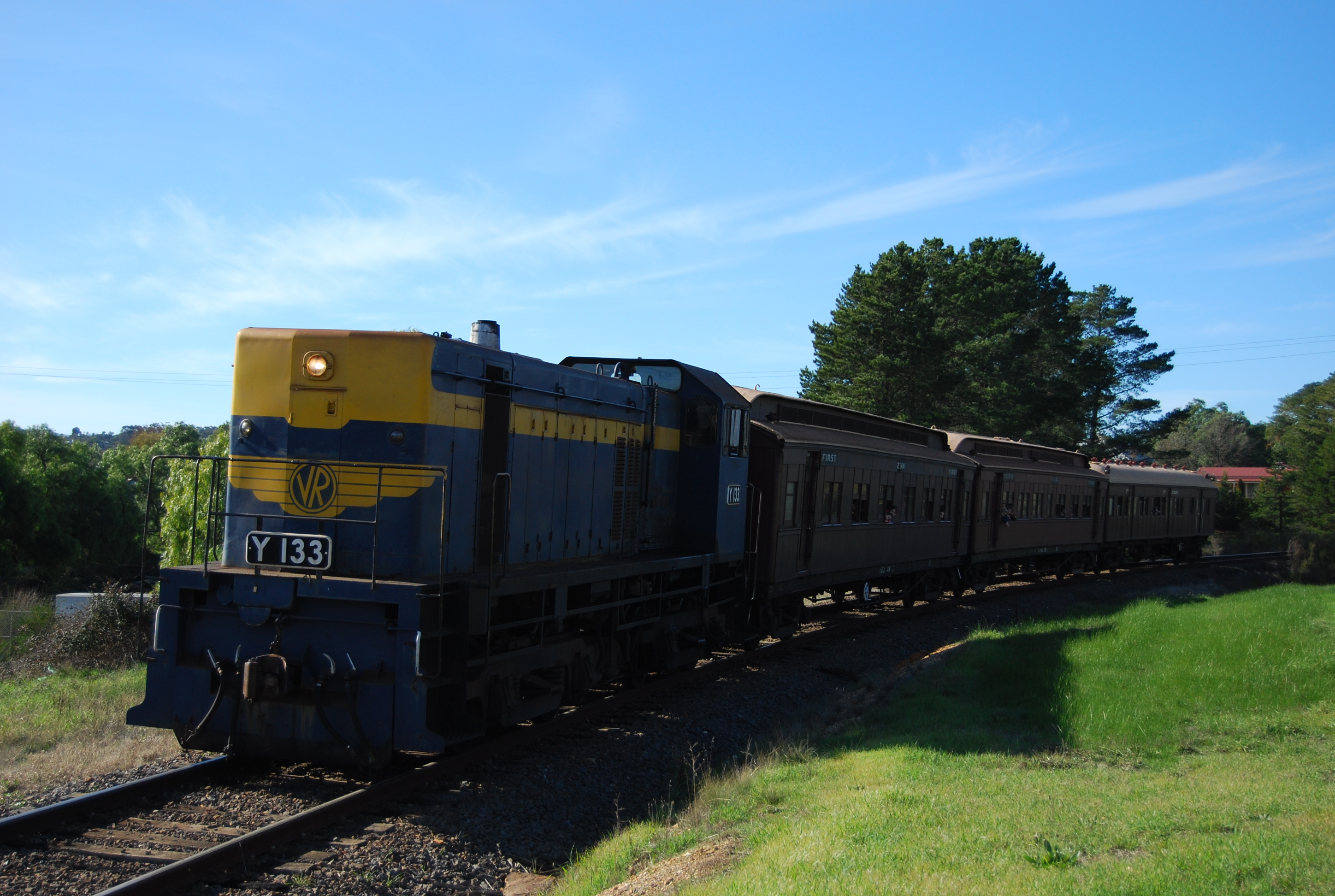
Preserved Seymour Railway Heritage Centre Y133 in July 2009

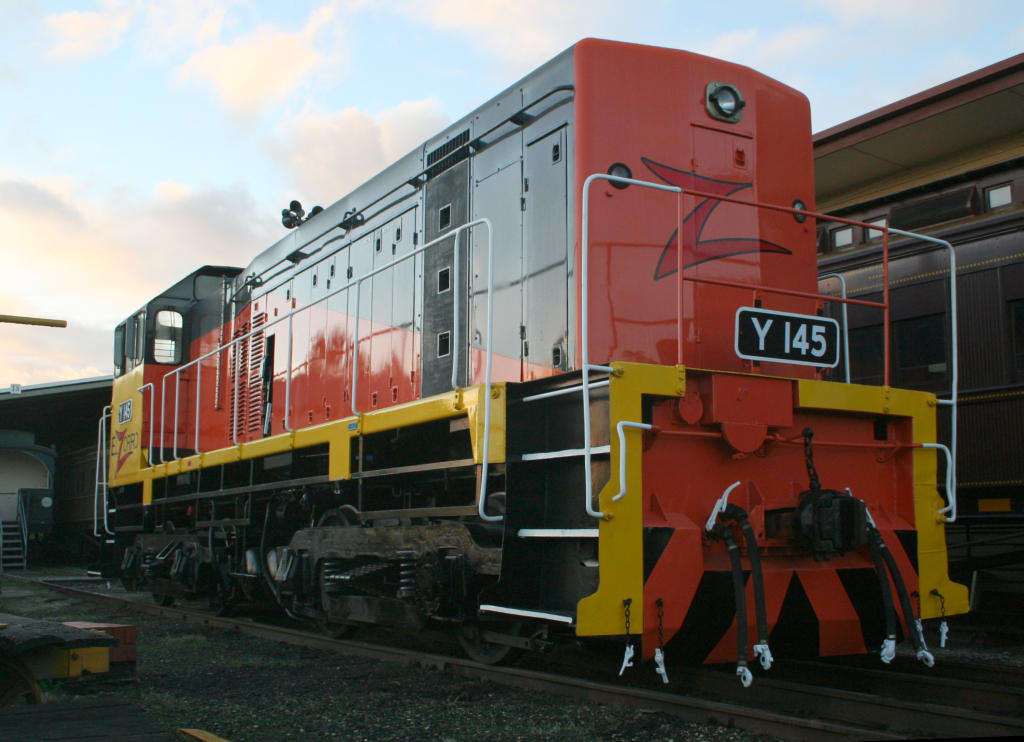
El Zorro Y145 in June 2008

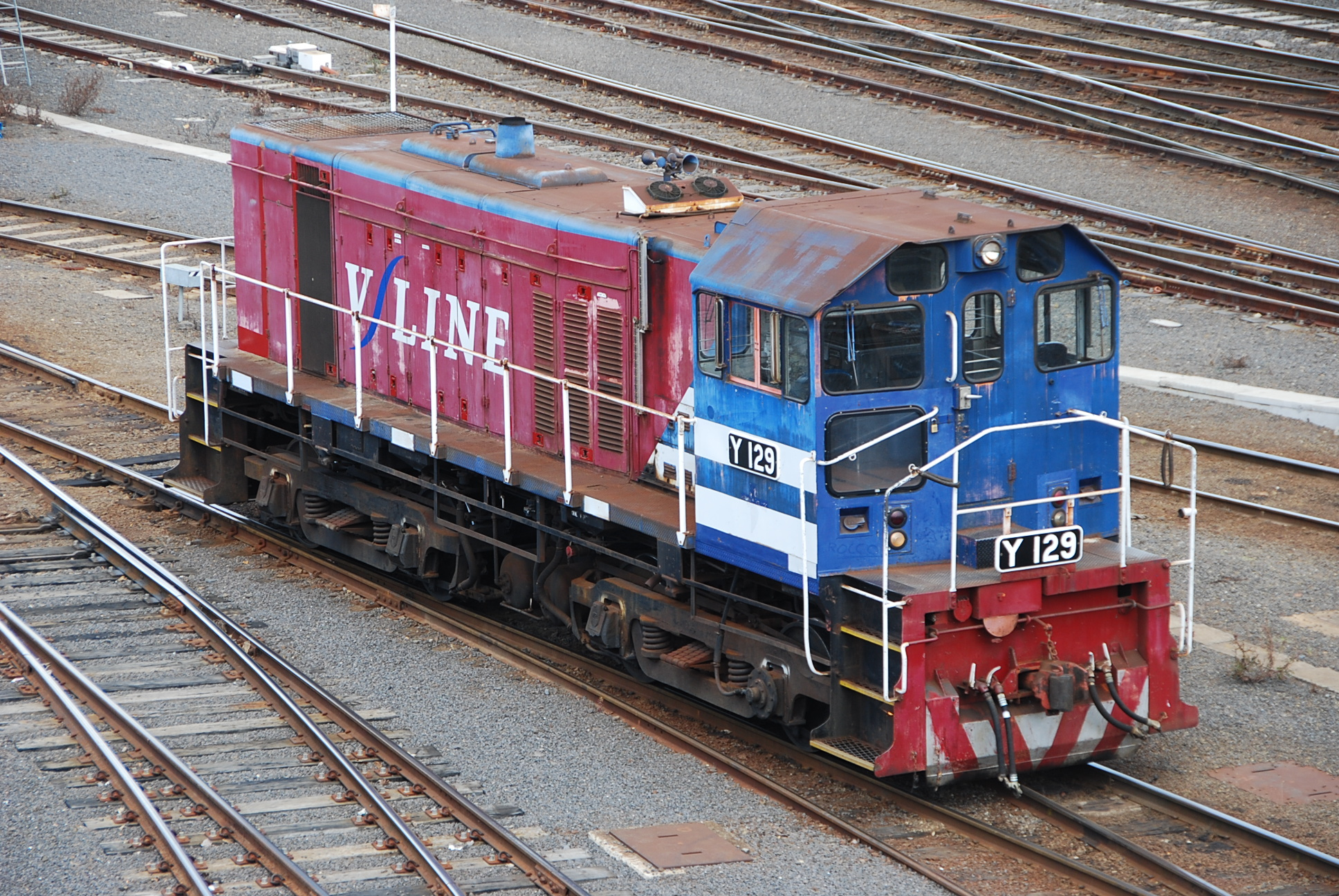
V/Line Y129 at Southern Cross in October 2011

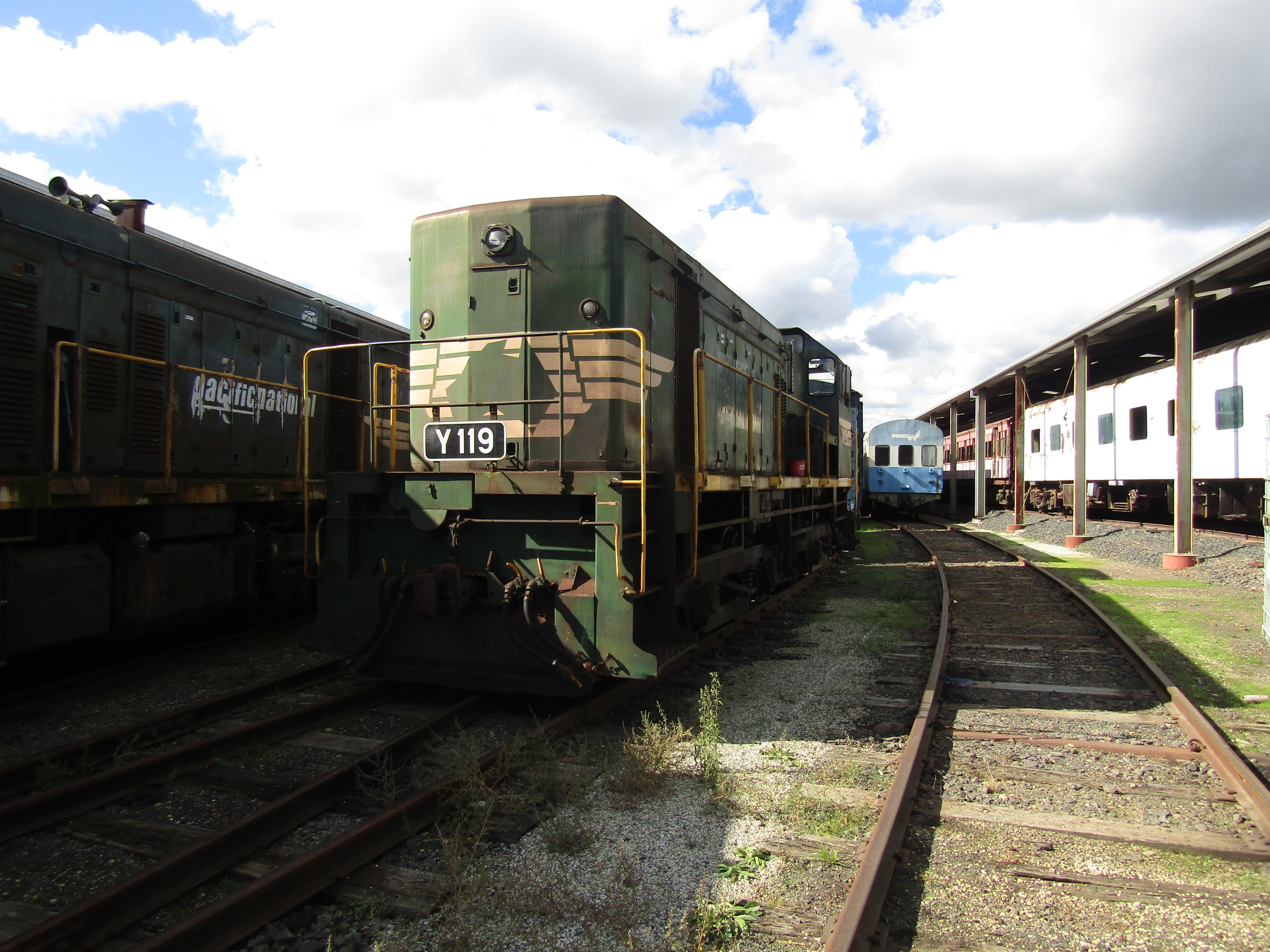
Y119 stabled at the Seymour Railway Heritage Centre in April 2023

In 1963, the first of 25 general purpose diesel-electric locomotives was delivered by Clyde Engineering. As a cost saving measure, they were built with bogies and motors retrieved from scrapped Swing Door electric suburban train sets; the re-use of these components reduced the unit cost of the Y class locomotive from around £52,000 ($104,000) to £40,000 ($80,000). Two further orders saw the class total 75 by 1968. A slightly modified version of the design was built for Western Australian Government Railways in 1966 for use as its J class.

Although built to dieselise Victoria's shunting operations and replace steam locomotives on branch line services, they were also used on mainline goods and passenger services, including between Spencer Street and Werribee.

Y123 was the original diesel Commissioner's engine, replacing D^{3} 639, until it was replaced by Y175. The first trip of Y175, re-geared to operate at 60 mph (97 km/h) and hauling Norman, was on the Geelong line on 9 September 1968.

After closure of branch lines across the state and the end of short pick-up goods trains, use of the class dropped.

By Saturday 19 July 1986, engines Y101-106, 108–110, 113, 117, 119–120, 122, 124, 127, 129–130, 132, 134–135, 137–138, 141–149, 152–153, 155–161, 163, 165–169 and 172–175 were painted in V/Line orange and grey. Y121 was being repainted at Newport Workshops and Y146 was stored, while Y128 and Y136 were yard pilots at Newport and Y142 was the yard pilot at Bendigo Workshops.

Engines Y118 and Y121 were noted working Melbourne Hump Yard at the end of September 1989, in lieu of shunting engines F211 and F212 with a comment indicating that narrower wheels must have been used to make the engines compatible with the retarding equipment used to slow individual wagons to precise speeds when rolling downhill.

Withdrawals commenced from 1985, around the same time that a handful of specific T class locomotives were found to be lighter than the rest of the fleet and thus permitted to operate north of Echuca. As at 1 July 1987, Y103, 106, 111, 114, 116, 123, 134 and 162 were placed into storage, while 107, 125, 128, 136, 142 and 146 were all allocated to specific workshops and not permitted outside those compounds. The stored and limited use engines were of both colour schemes; 103, 106, 134, 125, 136, 142 and 146 had all been painted in V/Line orange, while the balance were still in Victorian Railways' blue. At this point, Y101-104 were the standard gauge group, sans Y103 in storage. At 1 August 1987, Y140 had joined the workshop group, while Y105 had joined the withdrawn group, and Y103 may have re-entered service. Y151, 156, 157 and 171 were undergoing repainting at Newport Workshops.

Large-scale scrappings commenced during 1991 and 1992. After the mass-withdrawals of the Y fleet up to 1992, engines 101, 102, 104, 150 and 151 were on standard gauge, as 103 had been withdrawn in the late 1980s. Y101 followed in the early '90s after suffering a collision, but it was not directly replaced.

In 1990 four engines, Y113, 118, 130 and 171, were altered to be coupled pneumatically when in multiple-unit operation for shunting in Tottenham Yard. This was because individual locomotives were no longer sufficient to work longer trains. The modification allowed the second engine's self-lapping brake to be cut in or out and be operated from the first engine in a coupled set.

From 1995, under the newly formed V/Line Freight division, engines Y115, Y151, Y152 and Y169 were running trains on standard gauge, and locomotives Y124 and Y142 were confined to shunting at South Dynon. Within a few years, Y150 had replaced Y115 on standard gauge, with the latter engine shifting to Ballarat as a yard pilot. Around the same time, Y169 replaced Y102, and Y152 replaced Y104. These two engines were stored at Newport workshops, then transferred to South Dynon's "rotten row" where they sat for about a decade.

Only two engines—Y152 and Y165—were repainted into the V/Line Freight scheme, which was essentially the same as previous with a new decal and a lighter grey.

The 1999 sale of V/Line Freight to Freight Victoria included engines 110, 113, 115, 118–119, 121–122, 138, 150–152, 157, 165, 169, 171 and 174. Some of these were upgraded by 2002 using traction motors and gear sets cascaded from the Freight Australia A and X Class locomotive upgrades, permitting operation at 80 km/h. This required replacing the original plain whitemetal axle boxes; in the short term they were modified but eventually they were all replaced with custom units, obviating the need for fortnightly lubrication of the bearings. Air conditioning was also fitted.

In 2005, Y109 and Y145 were sold to El Zorro. 145 was scrapped and spare parts used to repair 109, which took on 145's number during its service with El Zorro. In 2014, the unit was sold to the Yarra Valley Tourist Railway and renumbered back to its original number.

On 17 February 2013, a mass move of Y class occurred to Newport to be distributed to various heritage operators; locomotives on the train consisted of Y127/VAN/Y102/Y143/Y104/Y108/Y125.

As of October 2025, two are in service with V/Line as carriage yard shunters and fitted with low speed controls, with others owned by freight operators Southern Shorthaul Railroad and Pacific National. Seventeen units are officially preserved, though only a handful of those are operational.

=== Use on standard gauge ===
Aside from delivery runs (where engines arrived on standard gauge and were transferred within three days of arrival, allowing for weekends), (Note: For example, T367 was delivered on standard gauge on Friday 7 February 1964, and converted to broad gauge on Monday 10 February 1964.) the following are known allocations of Y class locomotives operating on standard gauge. Common uses early on were to work ballast trains, or as yard pilots at Spencer Street, South Dynon, Seymour and Albury-Wodonga. Very occasionally, the engines would be used to rescue a disabled train. As of September 2026, table entries below are only complete through to the early 1990s and may not reflect liveries applied.

Locomotive	Order	To SG	Ex SG	Days	Notes
Y101	1	By 28 Nov 1982	After 01 Aug 1993	3,899	May have gone to SG earlier. Not clear when repainted from blue to orange.
Y102	1	11 May 1982	24 Oct 1983	531	Removed from SG account collision damage.
Y102	1	22 Nov 1984	After 01 Aug 1993	3,592	Painted orange by 31 January 1985
Y103	1	19 Jan 1978	12 May 1979	478	May have remained on SG later
Y103	1	04 Apr 1983	15 Nov 1983	225	Collision damage, moved to Newport Workshops
Y103	1	By Apr 1984	By 19 Mar 1989	1,800	By this date, converted to broad gauge and moved to storage at Melbourne Freight Terminal.
Y104	1	10 Oct 1982	Aug 1992	3,583	Withdrawn and stored at South Dynon after this date. Not clear when repainted from blue to orange.
Y111	1	06 Nov 1963	After Feb 1964	90	Arrived on SG, used immediately as yard pilot. May have remained on SG later
Y114	1	05 Nov 1983	After 14 Apr 1984,		No mention in Newsrails August 1984 to August 1987. Engine withdrawn on or by 1 July 1987.
Y115	1	22 Nov 1980	04 Apr 1983	863	
Y115	1	By 30 Jul 1983	After 22 Nov 1984, before 17 September 1985	481	
Y122	1	By 30 Aug 1977	22 Jan 1980	1,030	May have gone to SG earlier.
Y124	1	10 Feb 1964	After Aug 1968	1,655	Delivered and remained on SG. May have remained on SG later.
Y125	1	11 Feb 1964	After Aug 1968	1,633	On delivery, based at Seymour as a bank engine. May have remained on SG later
Y139	2	18 Apr 1979	10 Oct 1982	1,271	
Y147	2	27 Apr 1978	By 11 Jan 1978	188	
Y150	2	09 Jan 1967	03 Mar 1967	53	
Y150	2	19 Mar 1989	Still on SG Oct 1995	561	
Y151	3	By 20 Jul 1989	Still on SG Oct 1995	438	
Y155	3	06 Sep 1975	By 12 May 1979	2,439	
Y155	3	After 12 May 1979	11 May 1982	2,439	
Y172	3	28 Jan 1969	08 Sep 1975	2,414	To Dynon, later re-entered service BG
Y173	3	Sep 1969	04 Apr 1978	3,540	
Y174	3	Sep 1968	31 Jul 1976	2,914	May have remained on SG later

== Status table ==
Key:	In Service	Stored	Preserved	Converted	Unknown	Scrapped

Number	Entered service	Status	Livery	Name	Owners	Notes
Y101 (1st order)	Tuesday, 17 September 1963	Scrapped – 1992	V/Line Orange & Grey		VR (Built), VicRail (1976), V/Line (1983)	
Y102	Tuesday, 17 September 1963	Preserved - Operational	V/Line Orange & Grey		VR (Built), VicRail (1976), V/Line (1983), SRHC (2015)	Reactivated in October 2024. Used as a shunter within the SRHC Yard.
Y103	Wednesday, 25 September 1963	Scrapped – 1992	V/Line Orange & Grey		VR (Built), VicRail (1976), V/Line (1983)	
Y104	Wednesday, 25 September 1963	Stored	V/Line Orange & Grey		VR (Built), VicRail (1976), V/Line (1983), SRHC (2015)	
Y105	Friday, 4 October 1963	Scrapped – 1992	V/Line Orange & Grey		VR (Built), VicRail (1976), V/Line (1983)	
Y106	Friday, 4 October 1963	Scrapped – 1991	V/Line Orange & Grey		VR (Built), VicRail (1976), V/Line (1983)	
Y107	Tuesday, 15 October 1963	Scrapped – 1991	VR Blue & Gold		VR (Built), VicRail (1976), V/Line (1983)	
Y108	Tuesday, 15 October 1963	Stored	V/Line Orange & Grey		VR (Built), VicRail (1976), V/Line (1983), 707 Operations (2015)	
Y109 (as Y145)	Friday, 25 October 1963	Preserved	V/Line Orange & Grey		VR (Built), VicRail (1976), V/Line (1983), 707 Operations (1996), El Zorro (2005), Yarra Valley Tourist Railway (2014)	Renumbered Y145 by EL Zorro, Preserved
Y110	Friday, 25 October 1963	Scrapped – 2011	V/Line Orange & Grey		VR (Built), VicRail (1976), V/Line (1983), FV/FA (1999/2000), PN (2004)	
Y111	Wednesday, 6 November 1963	Scrapped – 1991	VR Blue & Gold		VR (Built), VicRail (1976), V/Line (1983)	As per all VR locos that ever carried the number "111" was known as "Lord Nelson" by Drivers and Fitters (1 x eye; 1 x arm; 1 x bottom). Had A7-EL Automatic Brake handle in cab (instead of No.4; Independent was a Westinghouse "W" type self lapping brake as per other Y class) but did NOT have full A7EL brake equipment
Y112	Wednesday, 6 November 1963	Scrapped – 1992	VR Blue & Gold		VR (Built), VicRail (1976), V/Line (1983)	
Y113	Tuesday, 19 November 1963	Scrapped – 2011	V/Line Orange & Grey		VR (Built), VicRail (1976), V/Line (1983), FV/FA (1999/2000), PN (2004)	
Y114	Tuesday, 19 November 1963	Scrapped – 1992	V/Line Orange & Grey		VR (Built), VicRail (1976), V/Line (1983)	
Y115	Thursday, 28 November 1963	In Service	Green and Grey - Regional Connect		VR (Built), VicRail (1976), V/Line (1983), FV/FA (1999/2000), PN (2004), Ettamogah Rail Hub (2015)	
Y116	Thursday, 28 November 1963	Scrapped – 1992	VR Blue & Gold		VR (Built), VicRail (1976), V/Line (1983)	
Y117	Tuesday, 10 December 1963	Scrapped – 1991	V/Line Orange & Grey		VR (Built), VicRail (1976), V/Line (1983)	
Y118	Tuesday, 10 December 1963	Scrapped – 2015	Freight Australia Green & Yellow		VR (Built), VicRail (1976), V/Line (1983), FV/FA (1999/2000), PN (2004)	
Y119	Thursday, 19 December 1963	stored	Freight Australia Green & Yellow		VR (Built), VicRail (1976), V/Line (1983), FV/FA (1999/2000), PN (2004), Ettamogah Rail Hub (2015), Yarra Valley Railway (2026)	Sold ex PN to Ettamogah Rail Hub Pty Ltd. Registered with Southern Shorthaul Railroad; operating under Qube Logistics accreditation. Sold to the Yarra Valley Railway in July 2026.
Y120	Thursday, 19 December 1963	Scrapped – 1992	V/Line Orange & Grey		VR (Built), VicRail (1976), V/Line (1983)	
Y121	Tuesday, 7 January 1964	Scrapped – 2011	V/Line Orange & Grey		VR (Built), VicRail (1976), V/Line (1983), FV/FA (1999/2000), PN (2004)	
Y122	Tuesday, 7 January 1964	Scrapped – 2015	Freight Australia Green & Yellow		VR (Built), VicRail (1976), V/Line (1983), FV/FA (1999/2000), PN (2004)	
Y123	Friday, 17 January 1964	Scrapped – 1991	V/Line Orange & Grey		VR (Built), VicRail (1976), V/Line (1983)	FIRST Diesel-Electric Commissioners' Locomotive. Only geared as standard for 40 M.P.H. / 65 km/h. Interior of cab painted non-standard plain white for Commissioners' Train use. Replaced steam locomotive D3 639 (really D3 658) until arrival of 60 M.P.H. geared Y175 in August 1968. Commissioners' Driver at change-over from steam to diesel was Tommy Donnelly
Y124	Friday, 17 January 1964	Stored	V/Line Orange & Grey		VR (Built), VicRail (1976), V/Line (1983), FV/FA (1999/2000), PN (2004), Ettamogha Rail Hub (2015), Southern Shorthaul Railroad (2025)	Was restricted to South Dynon only. Transferred from Pacific National - Rural and Bulk to Ettamogah Rail Hub and leased to Southern Shorthaul Railroad by 6 February 2024. To SSR accreditation by 28 October 2025. Metro Trains Melbourne circular SW.0790/2025 lists this engine with 559 kW for traction, grouped with third series Y Class locomotives.
Y125	Monday, 10 February 1964	Stored	V/Line Orange & Grey		VR (Built), VicRail (1976), V/Line (1983), DERMPAV (2015)	
Y126 (2nd order)	Tuesday, 4 May 1965	Scrapped – 1992	VR Blue & Gold		VR (Built), VicRail (1976), V/Line (1983)	
Y127	Tuesday, 4 May 1965	Preserved – Operational	V/Line Orange & Grey		VR (Built), VicRail (1976), V/Line (1983), 707 Operations (2013)	Repainted into V/Line orange & grey 2021
Y128	Saturday, 22 May 1965	Scrapped – 1988	V/Line Orange & Grey		VR (Built), VicRail (1976), V/Line (1983)	
Y129	Saturday, 22 May 1965	In Service	Purple/Yellow 'PTV'		VR (Built), VicRail (1976), V/Line (1983), V/Line Passenger (1995), Southern Shorthaul Railroad (2025)	Acquired by SSR from V/Line in October 2025, North Bendigo yard pilot. Former Yard Pilot locomotive at Southern Cross.
Y130	Saturday, 22 May 1965	Scrapped – 2011	V/Line Orange & Grey		VR (Built), VicRail (1976), V/Line (1983)	
Y131	Friday, 4 June 1965	Scrapped – 1992	VR Blue & Gold		VR (Built), VicRail (1976), V/Line (1983)	
Y132	Friday, 4 June 1965	Scrapped – 1992	V/Line Orange & Grey		VR (Built), VicRail (1976), V/Line (1983)	
Y133	Thursday, 17 June 1965	Preserved – Operational	VR Blue & Gold		VR (Built), VicRail (1976), V/Line (1983), VicTrack Heritage (2001)	Allocated to the Victorian Goldfields Railway
Y134	Thursday, 17 June 1965	Stored	DownerEDi Rail White and Blue	Yoda (unofficial)	VR (Built), VicRail (1976), V/Line (1983), EDI-Rail (1999) Progress-Rail Cardiff (2023)	Was EDi / Downer pilot at Cardiff. Now Progress Rail pilot at Cardiff, not used, in storage
Y135	Sunday, 27 June 1965	Stored	VR Blue & Gold		VR (Built), VicRail (1976), V/Line (1983), South Gippsland Railway (????), Yarra Valley Railway (2016)	
Y136	Sunday, 27 June 1965	In Service	Blue With Yellow Stickers	James W Ryan (preserved)	VR (Built), VicRail (1976), V/Line (1983), EDI-Rail (1999), Yarra Valley Railway (2025)	Former Newport Workshops pilot
Y137	Saturday, 10 July 1965	Preserved – Static	V/Line Orange & Grey		VR (Built), VicRail (1976), V/Line (1983), VicTrack Heritage (2001)	Allocated to Newport Railway Museum
Y138	Saturday, 10 July 1965	Scrapped – 2011	V/Line Orange & Grey		VR (Built), VicRail (1976), V/Line (1983), FV/FA (1999/2000), PN (2004)	
Y139	Wednesday, 21 July 1965	Scrapped – 1992	VR Blue & Gold		VR (Built), VicRail (1976), V/Line (1983)	
Y140	Wednesday, 21 July 1965	Scrapped – 1996	VR Blue & Gold		VR (Built), VicRail (1976), V/Line (1983)	
Y141	Saturday, 31 July 1965	Scrapped – 1992	V/Line Orange & Grey		VR (Built), VicRail (1976), V/Line (1983)	
Y142	Saturday, 31 July 1965	Stored	Freight Australia Green & Yellow		VR (Built), VicRail (1976), V/Line (1983), FV/FA (1999/2000), PN (2004), Ettamogah Rail Hub (2015), Yarra Valley Railway (2026)	Sold ex PN to Ettamogah Rail Hub Pty Ltd. Sold to the Yarra Valley Railway in July 2026.
Y143	Thursday, 12 August 1965	Stored	V/Line Orange & Grey		VR (Built), VicRail (1976), V/Line (1983), 707 Operations (2015)	
Y144	Thursday, 12 August 1965	Scrapped – 1992	V/Line Orange & Grey		VR (Built), VicRail (1976), V/Line (1983)	
Y145	Thursday, 26 August 1965	Scrapped – 2014	El Zorro		VR (Built), VicRail (1976), V/Line (1983); Great Northern Rail Services (1994 – frame only), El Zorro (2003)	Original Y145 scrapped by Great Northern Rail Services, second Y145 is former Y109 now preserved Yarra Valley Tourist Railway.
Y146	Thursday, 26 August 1965	Scrapped – 1992	V/Line Orange & Grey		VR (Built), VicRail (1976), V/Line (1983)	
Y147	Thursday, 16 September 1965	Scrapped - 2026	Freight Australia Green & Yellow		VR (Built), VicRail (1976), V/Line (1983), FV/FA (1999/2000), PN (2004), Ettamogah Rail Hub (2015), Yarra Valley Railway (2025).	Sold ex PN to Ettamogah Rail Hub Pty Ltd. Sold to the Yarra Valley Railway in July 2026. Broken up in September 2026.
Y148	Thursday, 16 September 1965	In Service	Yellow		VR (Built), VicRail (1976), V/Line (1983), BlueScope Steel (1993)	Long Island pilot
Y149	Saturday, 2 October 1965	Scrapped – 1996	V/Line Orange & Grey		VR (Built), VicRail (1976), V/Line (1983)	
Y150	Saturday, 2 October 1965	Scrapped – 2011	V/Line Orange & Grey		VR (Built), VicRail (1976), V/Line (1983), FV/FA (1999/2000), PN (2004)	
Y151 (3rd order)	Thursday, 21 December 1967	In Service	Green and Grey - Regional Connect		VR (Built), VicRail (1976), V/Line (1983), FV/FA (1999/2000), PN (2004), Ettamogah Rail Hub (2015)	
Y152	Thursday, 21 December 1967	Stored	Freight Australia Green & Yellow		VR (Built), VicRail (1976), V/Line (1983), FV/FA (1999/2000), PN (2004), Ettamogha Rail Hub (2021), Southern Shorthaul Railroad (2026)	Reconfigured control stands and CCTV for Driver Only Operation. Purchased from Pacific National by Ettamogah circa 2021. Leased to Southern Shorthaul Railroad by 6 February 2024. To SSR accreditation by 28 October 2025.
Y153	Saturday, 13 January 1968	Scrapped – 1992	V/Line Orange & Grey		VR (Built), VicRail (1976), V/Line (1983)	
Y154	Saturday, 13 January 1968	Scrapped – 1992	VR Blue & Gold		VR (Built), VicRail (1976), V/Line (1983)	
Y155	Wednesday, 31 January 1968	Scrapped – 1992	V/Line Orange & Grey		VR (Built), VicRail (1976), V/Line (1983)	
Y156	Friday, 23 February 1968	In Service	Purple/Yellow 'PTV'		VR (Built), VicRail (1976), V/Line (1983), V/Line Passenger (1995)	Based at Southern Cross, on sale
Y157	Wednesday, 28 February 1968	Stored	Freight Australia Green & Yellow		VR (Built), VicRail (1976), V/Line (1983), FV/FA (1999/2000), PN (2004), Ettamogah Rail Hub (2015), Yarra Valley Railway (2026)	Sold ex PN to Ettamogah Rail Hub Pty Ltd. Sold to the Yarra Valley Railway in July 2026.
Y158	Thursday, 14 March 1968	Scrapped – 1992	VR Blue & Gold		VR (Built), VicRail (1976), V/Line (1983)	
Y159	Thursday, 14 March 1968	Preserved – Operational	VR Blue & Gold		VR (Built), VicRail (1976), V/Line (1983), Daylesford Spa Country Railway (1989)	
Y160	Wednesday, 3 April 1968	Scrapped – 1992	V/Line Orange & Grey		VR (Built), VicRail (1976), V/Line (1983)	
Y161	Wednesday, 3 April 1968	In Service	Purple/Yellow 'PTV'		VR (Built), VicRail (1976), V/Line (1983), V/Line Passenger (1995)	Based at Southern Cross, on sale. Was used at Newport Workshops while Y164 was under repairs.
Y162	Saturday, 27 April 1968	Scrapped – 1988	VR Blue & Gold		VR (Built), VicRail (1976), V/Line (1983)	
Y163	Saturday, 27 April 1968	In service	Purple/Yellow 'PTV'		VR (Built), VicRail (1976), V/Line (1983), V/Line Passenger (1995)	Based at Southern Cross, on sale
Y164	Saturday, 18 May 1968	Preserved – Operational	VR Blue & Gold		VR (Built), VicRail (1976), V/Line (1983), VicTrack Heritage (1991)	Allocated to Steamrail Victoria. Currently Newport Workshops West Block pilot
Y165	Saturday, 18 May 1968	Scrapped (Jan 2020)	Freight Australia Green & Yellow		VR (Built), VicRail (1976), V/Line (1983), FV/FA (1999/2000), PN (2004)	
Y166	Wednesday, 5 June 1968	Scrapped – 1991	V/Line Orange & Grey		VR (Built), VicRail (1976), V/Line (1983)	
Y167	Wednesday, 5 June 1968	Scrapped – 1992	V/Line Orange & Grey		VR (Built), VicRail (1976), V/Line (1983)	
Y168	Tuesday, 18 June 1968	Stored	V/Line Orange & Grey		VR (Built), VicRail (1976), V/Line (1983), DERMPAV (2015)	
Y169	Tuesday, 18 June 1968	Stored	Freight Australia Green & Yellow		VR (Built), VicRail (1976), V/Line (1983), FV/FA (1999/2000), PN (2004), Ettamogha Rail Hub (2015), Southern Shorthaul Railroad (2025)	Sold to Ettamogah Rail Hub Pty Ltd 17/2/14 ex Pacific National. To SSR accreditation by 28 October 2025.
Y170	Saturday, 13 July 1968	Scrapped – 1992	VR Blue & Gold		VR (Built), VicRail (1976), V/Line (1983)	
Y171	Saturday, 13 July 1968	Stored	Freight Australia Green & Yellow		VR (Built), VicRail (1976), V/Line (1983), FV/FA (1999/2000), PN (2004), Ettamogah Rail Hub (2015), Yarra Valley Railway (2025)	
Y172	Thursday, 25 July 1968	Scrapped – 1992	V/Line Orange & Grey		VR (Built), VicRail (1976), V/Line (1983)	
Y173	Thursday, 25 July 1968	Scrapped – 1996	VR Blue & Gold		VR (Built), VicRail (1976), V/Line (1983), Australian Paper Mills (may have been leased only; was painted yellow)	
Y174	Thursday, 8 August 1968	Stored	Freight Australia Green & Yellow		VR (Built), VicRail (1976), V/Line (1983), FV/FA (1999/2000), PN (2004), Ettamogah Rail Hub (2015), Yarra Valley Railway (2025)	
Y175	Thursday, 8 August 1968	Scrapped – 1992	V/Line Orange & Grey		VR (Built), VicRail (1976), V/Line (1983)	Downgraded to "standard" Y class 65 km/h gearing circa 1980 when T class locomotives (399, 400, 403, 406, 410) took over Commissioners' Train role. Was only Y fitted with a 64 Volt power outlet (above main reservoir on Driver's side) for powering batteries on Norman Car on Commissioners' Train overnight)
