= British Rail Class 11 =

Class of 120 350hp diesel-electric shunters

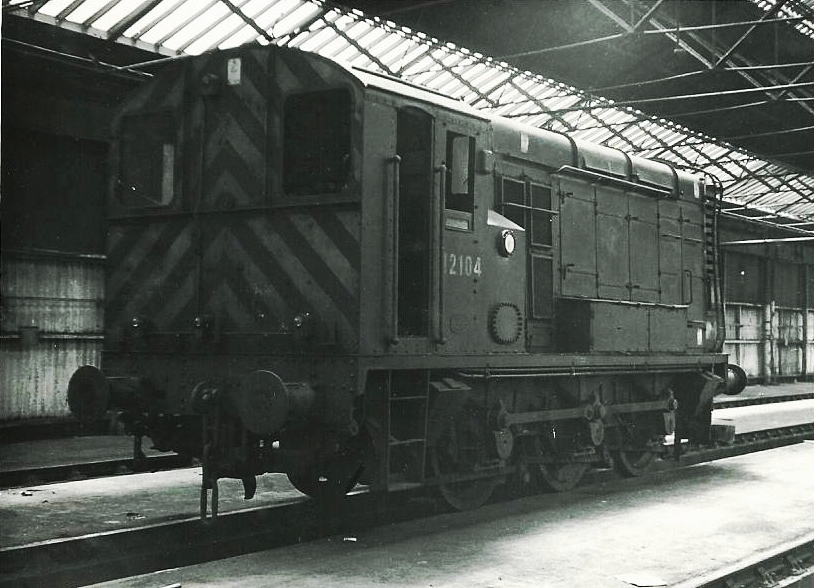
- 12104 at Stratford MPD in 1967
Type and origin
- Power type: Diesel-electric
- Builder: LMS/BR Derby, BR Darlington
- Build date: 1945–1952
- Total produced: 120
Specifications
- Configuration
  - Whyte: 0-6-0DE
  - UIC: C
- Gauge: 4 ft 8 1/2 in (1,435 mm) standard gauge
- Wheel diameter: 4 ft 0 1/2 in (1.232 m)
- Minimum curve: 3.5 chains (70.41 m)
- Wheelbase: 11 ft 6 in (3.505 m)
- Length: 29 ft 1 1/2 in (8.88 m)
- Width: 8 ft 5 in (2.565 m)
- Height: 12 ft 5 1/2 in (3.797 m)
- Loco weight: 47.4 long tons (48.2 t; 53.1 short tons)
- Fuel capacity: 660 imp gal (3,000 L; 790 US gal)
- Prime mover: English Electric 6KT
- Generator: English Electric 801 — 441 A, 430 V DC
- Traction motors: English Electric 506, DC, 2 off
- Cylinders: Straight 6
- Transmission: Diesel-electric, double reduction gearing
- MU working: Not fitted
- Train heating: None
- Loco brake: Air
Performance figures
- Maximum speed: 20 mph (32 km/h)
- Power output: Engine: 350 hp (261 kW)
- Tractive effort: Maximum: 34,900 lbf (155.2 kN)
- Brakeforce: 32.2 long tons-force (321 kN)
Career
- Operators: War Department, Danske Statsbaner (DSB), Nederlandse Spoorwegen (NS), London, Midland and Scottish Railway, British Railways, National Coal Board, Harry Needle Railroad Company, Imperial Chemical Industries (ICI)
- Number in class: WD: 14 (10 to NS); LMS/BR: 106
- Numbers: WD: 70260–70273; LMS: 7120–7129; BR: 12033–12138
- Axle load class: RA 5
- Withdrawn: 1967–1972
- Disposition: 9 currently preserved, 1 destroyed in preservation, remainder scrapped

The British Rail Class 11 was applied to a batch of diesel shunting locomotives built from April 1945 to December 1952, based on a similar earlier batch built by the London, Midland and Scottish Railway (LMS) between 1934 and 1936.

== Overview ==
=== Numbering ===
An initial batch of twenty locomotives was built during World War II, fourteen of which were built for the War Department, with the first ten of these (70260–70269) subsequently going to the Nederlandse Spoorwegen post-war, as NS 501–510.

LMS numbers 7120–7126 went straight into LMS stock and a follow-up batch was built, with 7129 being the last diesel shunter to be built for the LMS.

British Railways continued to build the class from 1948 to 1952, using numbers M7130–M7131 and 12045–12138. 7120–7129 and M7130–M7131 became BR numbers 12033–12044. The whole class of 12033–12138 became Class 11. Locomotives up to 12102 were built at LMS/BR Derby and 12103–12138 at BR Darlington.

=== Export locomotives ===
Close to 100 almost identical machines were built by English Electric and supplied to Nederlandse Spoorwegen (NS) as its 500 Class & 600 Class diesel locomotives. In addition to the exported 501–510, 500 Class also included 511–545. Sixty-five of the 600 Class locomotives were built by English Electric between 1950 and 1957, numbered 601–665, at either Dick, Kerr & Co. Works (601–610) in Preston or Vulcan Foundry Works (remainder) in Newton-le-Willows. A further batch of 15 locomotives were exported without engines, so that they could be fitted as such in the Netherlands; they were numbered 701–715.

Another export order was to Australia, with 16 locomotives built in 1951 but with the design modified for use on 5 ft 3 in gauge railways. The Victorian Railways bought ten, which were designated as F class, and six were bought by the State Electricity Commission of Victoria for shunting on sidings connected to Victorian Railways tracks.

One member of Class 11 was built for transporting British soldiers in the former Nazi-occupied countries. Throughout the liberation period, it travelled through France, Belgium and the Netherlands, before finally reaching Germany. It was then used for transporting British troops and for shunting and was occasionally used on a few branch lines until 1957. The reason was that, after the war, the newly founded Deutsche Bundesbahn had to build up its locomotive fleet. As the more powerful German engines began to roll out, the Class 11 diesel was used less and, in 1953, it was withdrawn. It stood in Hamm Engine shed, in West Germany, until it was bought by Danish State Railways in 1957. It was then renumbered to DSB ML 6 and liveried in the dark green of Danish diesel shunters. It served on shunting duties in Copenhagen yards until 1973, when it was finally withdrawn for good and scrapped in 1974, in Hedehusene, Denmark.

English Electric works numbers 1550 and 1551 were built in 1949 for Swedish State Railways, numbered 3 and 4 respectively; they were tested in harbour shunting in Gothenburg. They were later sent to northern Sweden and the ore loading harbour of Luleå; they were later moved to a mine outside of Stockholm for service into 1992. Both are now preserved at Bothnia Railway Museum in Luleå.

=== Technical details ===
The diesel engine is an English Electric 6-cylinder, 10-inch bore by 12-inch stroke (254 mm by 305 mm); 4-stroke, 6KT and the traction motors are two: EE506 axle-hung, nose-suspended, force-ventilated traction motors with 21.7:1 double reduction gear drive. The main generator is an English Electric EE801, 441 A at 430 V.

== Withdrawal ==
The 106 locomotives of British Railways were withdrawn between May 1967 and November 1972:

Table of withdrawals
Year	Quantity in service at start of year	Quantity withdrawn	Locomotive numbers
1967	106	5	12068, 12104/07/23/29.
1968	101	17	12034–37/39–44/72, 12119–20/24/26/37–38.
1969	84	24	12033/38/45–48/57/59/64/66–67/70/86/92/95, 12100/12/16 (Note: accident damage)–17/25/31/33/35.
1970	60	11	12050/54/62/81/89/91, 12101/06/14–15/28.
1971	49	40	12049/51–53/55–56/58/60–61/65/69/71/73; 12075–78/80/82–85/87–88/90/93–94/97–99, 12102–03/05/08/11/18/21–22/36.
1972	9	10	12063/74/79, 12103 (Note: reinstated January, withdrawn June)/09–10/27/30/32/34.

== Post-BR use ==
Sixteen locomotives were sold to the National Coal Board and were used in North East England, South Wales and the Kent Coalfield.

Locomotive Number	Company	Disposition
12049	Day & Son, Brentford Town Goods Depot	Scrapped
12052	National Coal Board (NCB), Widdrington Disposal Plant	Scrapped
12054	A.R. Adams Ltd., Newport Docks	Scrapped
12060	NCB, Philadelphia Loco Shed	Scrapped
12061	NCB, Natgarw Coking Plant	Scrapped
12063	NCB, Natgarw Coking Plant	Scrapped
12071	NCB, Natgarw Coking Plant	Scrapped
12074	NCB, Swalwell Disposal Point	Scrapped
12074	Harry Needle Railroad Company (HNRC)	Scrapped
12082	U.K.F. Fertilisers Ltd., Ince Marshes	Scrapped
12083	Tilcon Ltd., Swinden Limeworks, Skipton.	Preserved - Battlefield Line
12084	NCB, Bates Colliery	Scrapped
12088	NCB, Swalwell Disposal Point	Preserved - Aln Valley Railway
12088	HNRC	Preserved - Aln Valley Railway
12093	NCB, Widdrington Disposal Point	Scrapped
12098	NCB, Philadelphia Loco Shed	Scrapped
12098	HNRC	Scrapped
12099	NCB, British Oak Disposal Point	Preserved - Severn Valley Railway
12119	NCB, Philadelphia Loco Shed	Scrapped
12122	NCB, British Oak Disposal Point	Scrapped
12131	NCB, Snowdown Colliery	Preserved - North Norfolk Railway
12133	NCB, Philadelphia Loco Shed	Scrapped

== Preservation ==
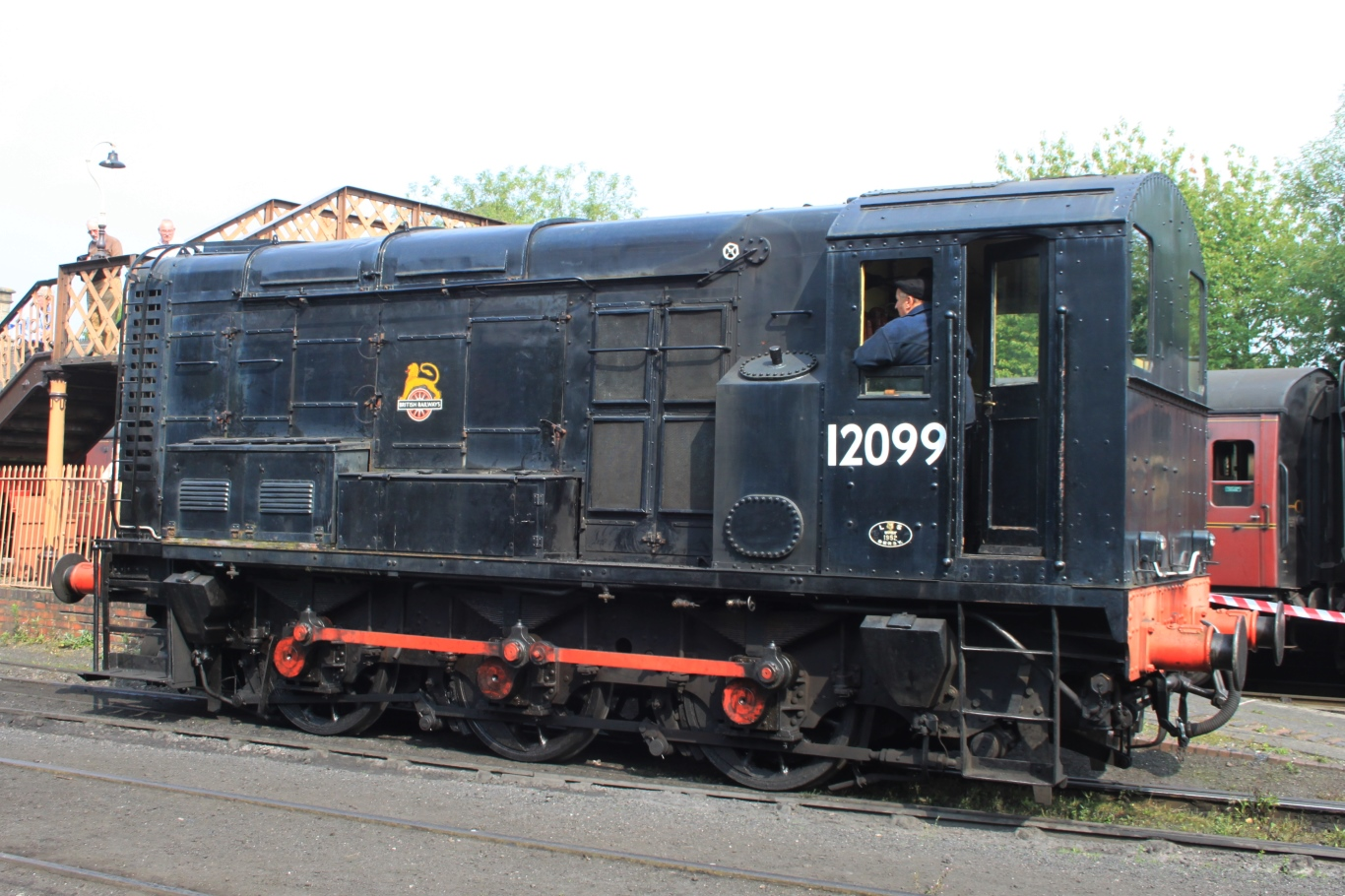
12099 preserved on the Severn Valley Railway

Only one of the LMS examples is preserved:

- AD601 at Lakeside and Haverthwaite Railway.

The following BR examples of Class 11 diesel shunters are preserved:

- 12052 at Caledonian Railway
- 12077 at Midland Railway – Butterley
- 12083 at Battlefield Line Railway
- 12088 at Aln Valley Railway
- 12093 at Caledonian Railway
- 12099 at Severn Valley Railway
- 12131 at North Norfolk Railway
- A ninth example 12049 (renumbered from 12082) is preserved at the Watercress Line in Hampshire. At one time it was re-registered as 01553, in TOPS Class 01/5, carried both numbers and was owned by the Harry Needle Railroad Company. 12082 was renumbered to 12049 in October 2010 and painted in BR green with a late crest but without the yellow/black ends; this was as a replacement for the original Mid-Hants locomotive 12049 that was scrapped after suffering catastrophic damage during an engine shed fire on 26 July 2010.

== Model railways ==
Model Rail offer a Class 11 in OO gauge, made in conjunction with Heljan.

== See also ==
- LMS diesel shunters
- Victorian Railways F class diesel shunter
