= 707 Operations =

Australian railway preservation group

R707 Operations
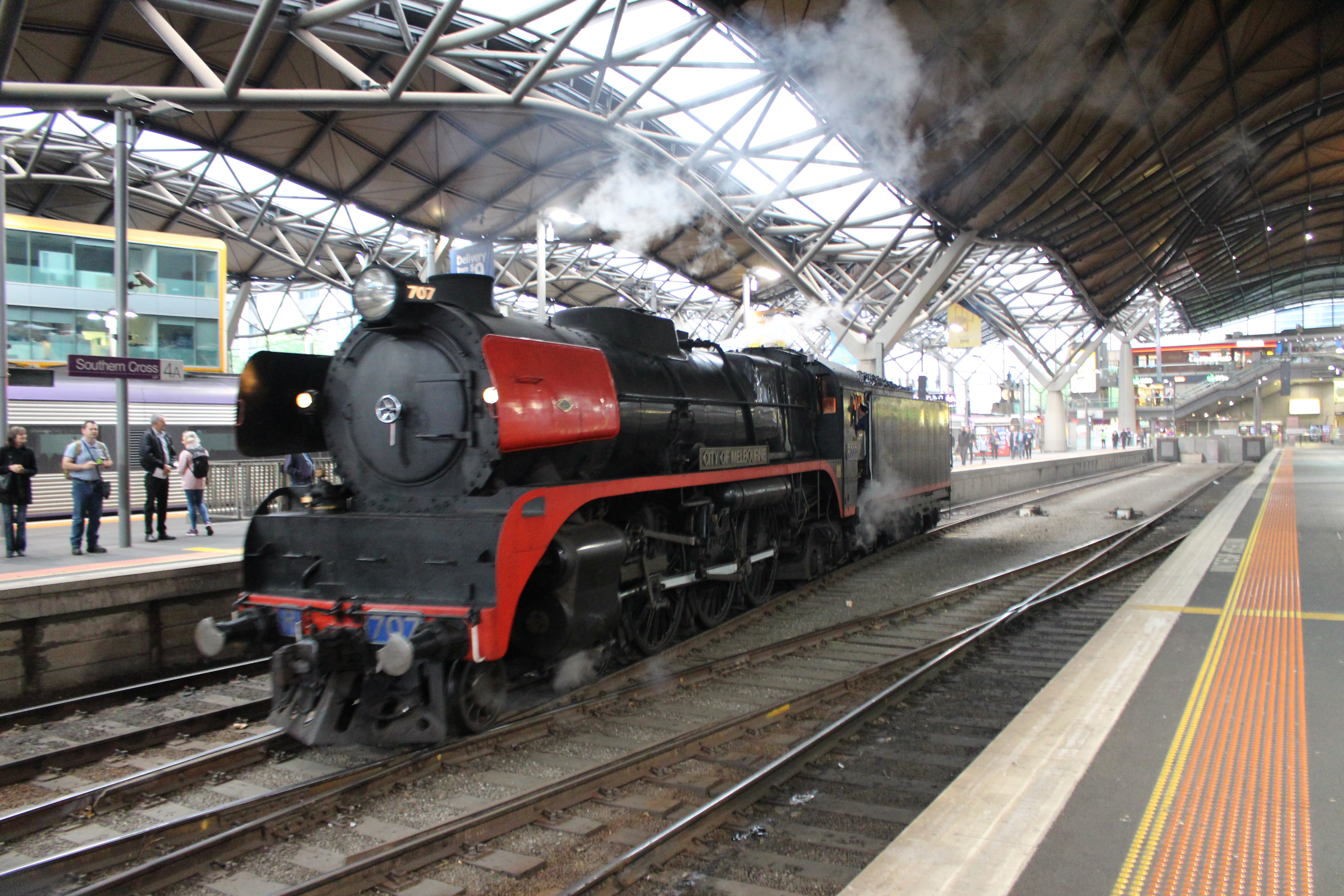
- Steam locomotive R707 at Southern Cross Station
- Established: 1980
- Location: 1 Shea Street, Newport, Victoria
- Coordinates: 37°51′00.2″S 144°52′47.3″E
- Type: Volunteer Organisation
- Collections: Locomotives, rolling stock, multiple units
- Website: Official site

707 Operations is a railway preservation group based in Melbourne, Australia. The volunteer organisation was established in 1980 to restore R class locomotive R707. The company has its own section of the Newport Workshops that is used for storing carriages and locomotives when not in use for trips (charter or regular). They are located in roads 7 and 8 of the Newport West Block Workshops.

707 Operations runs regular trips across the broad gauge rail network in Victoria and also charter trains. People who motorcade the train to photograph it are asked to consider donating $10 towards the costs of running the train. This has been controversial among the railway fraternity. For the donation, 707 Operations provide a detailed schedule and tour notes 24 hours prior to departure and SMS updates should the train fall behind schedule in excess of 30 minutes.

== History ==
In 1980, a committee of six men got together to inspect the withdrawn steam locomotive R707 at Newport Workshops. This locomotive had been withdrawn from service in 1974. After close examination of the locomotive, which showed some disrepair, a proposal was put forward to VicRail for restoration with work commencing in 1981. The restored locomotive made its debut on a return trip to Bacchus Marsh in July 1985.

== Operations ==
Today 707 Operations run heritage special trains in Victoria. In 2020 most trips were cancelled due to COVID restrictions, however since 2022, 707 Operations have resumed running their popular mainline day trips and sleeping car trips around Country Victoria and Tocumwal (NSW). Destinations include Bendigo, Bacchus Marsh, Quambatook and the Silo Art Trail, Tocumwal, Ballarat, Swan Hill, Echuca and Seymour.

== Fleet ==
After the restoration of R707, the organisation expanded their fleet further with R753 being bought as well as diesel locomotives F204, T413 and Y127. The organisation owns former West Coast Railways S and Z type carriages as well as South Australian Railways carriage 708 for use on special trips. No West Coast Railways liveried cars remain with all S and Z type cars having been repainted in 707 Operations red or VR Blue and Gold.

=== Locomotives ===
Number	Image	Year built	Builder	Status	Notes	Livery
A62		1952 (rebuilt 1983)	Clyde Engineering, Granville (rebuilt Clyde Engineering, Rosewater)	Operational	Allocated by VicTrack in 2020, restored fully in 2025	V/Line orange and grey
F208		1951	Dick Kerr Works, Preston, England	Operational	Limited to shunting duties	VR red and gold
H1		1968	Clyde Engineering, Granville	Stored	Acquired from Watco Australia in November 2026	PN blue and yellow
P13		1956 (rebuilt 1984)	Clyde Engineering, Granville (rebuilt Martin & King, Somerton)	Operational	Transferred from V/Line to 707 Operations ownership in November 2024. On Standard Gauge	V/Line Passenger Mk2
P20		1956 (rebuilt 1985)	Clyde Engineering, Granville (rebuilt Martin & King, Somerton)	Operational	Acquired from Pacific National in 2023	V/Line orange and grey
R707			North British Locomotive Company, Glasgow	Operational	Named City of Melbourne	Black and red
R753		1952	North British Locomotive Company, Glasgow	Stored	Parts source for R707	Black and red
S300		1957	Clyde Engineering, Granville	Operational	Privately owned, on Standard Gauge	CFCLA Silver and Blue
S306		1957	Clyde Engineering, Granville	Out of traffic, Overhaul	Purchased from Pacific National in September 2023 after being leased from the company since 2019	PN blue and yellow
T387		1965	Clyde Engineering, Granville	Operational	Privately owned, on Standard Gauge	CFCLA Silver and Blue
T392		1965	Clyde Engineering, Granville	Operational	Purchased from Pacific National in September 2023 after being leased from the company since 2019	Slow Rail Journeys Blue and Yellow
T413		1968	Clyde Engineering, Granville	Operational	Delivered as D1 for Fyansford Cement Works	VR blue and gold
Y108		1963	Clyde Engineering, Granville	Stored	Parts source for Y127	V/Line orange and grey
Y127		1965	Clyde Engineering, Granville	Operational	First locomotive painted into V/Line orange and grey in preservation	V/Line orange and grey
Y143		1965	Clyde Engineering, Granville	Stored	Parts source for Y127	V/Line orange and grey

== Passenger carriages ==
=== Z cars ===
Carriage	Image	Gauge	Year built	Livery	Notes
255 ACZ		Broad	1957	Vintage Rail Travel Mk3 - Red and 2 white stripes	Guards Van/First Class - Saloon Style
270 BZ		Broad	1959	Vintage Rail Travel Mk3 - Red and 2 white stripes	Second Class - Saloon Style
257 BCZ		Broad	1958	Grey Livery (Stripped of PTV Purple & Grey, including PTV and V/Line logos)	Guards Van/Second Class - Saloon Style. Transferred 14/05/2023
251 BTN		Broad	1956	Grey Livery (Stripped of PTV Purple & Grey, including PTV and V/Line logos)	Second Class - Saloon Style. Ex 1AZ.
259 BTN		Broad	1959	Grey Livery (Stripped of PTV Purple & Grey, including PTV and V/Line logos)	Saloon car converted to Dining Car. Transferred 06/07/2023

=== S Cars ===
Carriage	Image	Gauge	Year built	Livery	Notes
205 BS		Broad	1950	Vintage Rail Travel Mk3 - Red and 2 white stripes	Stored. Second Class - Compartment Style
212 BS		Broad	1949	VR Blue and Gold	Second Class - Compartment Style
215 BS		Broad	1955	VR Blue and Gold	Second Class - Compartment Style
224 BRS		Broad	1940	Vintage Rail Travel Mk3 - Red and 2 white stripes	Second Class - Compartment Style - Buffet

=== N Carriages ===
Carriage	Image	Gauge	Year built	Livery	Notes
ACN 45		Standard	1983	Grey Livery (Stripped of PTV Purple & Grey, including PTV and V/Line logos)	Guards Van/First Class - Saloon Style. Transferred August 2022
ACN 48		Standard	1983	Grey Livery (Stripped of PTV Purple & Grey, including PTV and V/Line logos)	Guards Van/First Class - Saloon Style. Transferred August 2022
BN 5		Standard	1981	Grey Livery (Stripped of PTV Purple & Grey, including PTV and V/Line logos)	Second Class - Saloon Style. Transferred August 2022
BN 22		Standard	1982	Grey Livery (Stripped of PTV Purple & Grey, including PTV and V/Line logos)	Second Class - Saloon Style. Transferred August 2022
BRN 43		Standard	1983	Grey Livery (Stripped of PTV Purple & Grey, including PTV and V/Line logos)	Second Class - Saloon Style - Buffet. Transferred August 2022

=== H Carriages ===
Carriage	Image	Gauge	Year built	Livery	Notes
BTH 174		Broad	1958, Converted to H Car 1989	Grey Livery (Stripped of PTV Purple & Grey, including PTV and V/Line logos)	Transferred 12/12/2024. ex Harris 688T
BIH 193		Broad	1957, Converted to H Car 1990	Grey Livery (Stripped of PTV Purple & Grey, including PTV and V/Line logos)	Transferred 12/12/2024. ex refurbished Harris 3505T
BCH 134		Broad	1962, Converted to H Car 1990	Grey Livery (Stripped of PTV Purple & Grey, including PTV and V/Line logos)	Transferred 12/12/2024. ex refurbished Harris 902M

=== Sleeping Cars ===
Carriage	Image	Gauge	Year built	Livery	Notes
SJ 284 Dorai		Broad	1950	Overland Maroon	Twinette Sleeping Car - Air Conditioning
JTA 6 Kuldalai		Broad	1957	Overland Maroon	Twinette Sleeping Car - Air Conditioning
LAN 2352		Broad	1961	Stainless Steel	Roomette Sleeping Car - Air Conditioning. Owned by THNSW
LAN 2354		Broad	1961	Stainless Steel	Roomette Sleeping Car - Air Conditioning. Privately Owned
NAM 2336		Broad	1961	Stainless Steel	Twinette Sleeping Car - Air Conditioning
NAM 2373		Standard	1963	Stainless Steel	Twinette Sleeping Car - Air Conditioning
NAM 2380		Broad	1963	Stainless Steel	Twinette Sleeping Car - Air Conditioning

=== Vans & Special carriages ===
Carriage	Image	Gauge	Year built	Livery	Notes
PCP 294		Broad	1957	Vintage Rail Travel Mk3 - Red and 2 white stripes	Power Van
PCO 3 (PCJ 492)		Broad	1970	Overland Maroon	Power Van
PCJ 493		Standard	1970	Silver	Power Van
PHA 2395		Standard	1984	Stainless Steel	Power Van. Owned by THNSW
PHN 2362		Standard	1961	Stainless Steel	Power Van. Owned by THNSW
2 CO		Broad	1970		Guards Van. Privately Owned
35 CP		Broad	1958	Red	Guards Van
37 CP		Broad	1958	Grey	Guards Van
708 BK		Broad	1941	Vintage Rail Travel Mk3 - Red and 2 white stripes	Lounge Car. Privately Owned
DC 783 Lowanna		Broad	1942	Maroon	Commissioner's crew car. Privately Owned
Club Car 1 Victoria		Broad	1970	Overland Maroon	Lounge Car
DF 935		Broad	1968	Stainless Steel	Indian Pacific Dining Car. Privately Owned
Sleeper 4 Buchan		Broad	1923	VR Blue and Gold	Twinshare Sleeping Car - Paritally converted to Crew Car

=== Electric Multiple Units ===
Carriage	Image	Gauge	Year built	Livery	Notes
3 M		Broad	1973	Stainless Steel	Hitachi Motor Car
304 D		Broad	1973	Stainless Steel	Hitachi Driving Trailer Car
178 M		Broad	1979	Stainless Steel	Hitachi Motor Car

=== Freight Wagons ===
Wagon	Image	Gauge	Year built	Livery	Notes
DT 318		Broad	1959	707 Ops Black	Luggage Van
VOAF 100		Broad		Black	Bogie Open Wagon for carrying coal
L 1174		Broad		Red	Former NSWGR Water Gin. Owned by THNSW
HH 5		Broad	1902	Red	Loco Breakdown Van
VLCX 187		Broad	1966	Red	Louvre Van
DT 361		Broad	1959	Red	Louvre Van
VLPY 125		Broad	1956	Red	Louvre Van
VWBA 2		Broad	1960	Red	Well Wagon. Holds Boiler ex R753
