= NS5 =

NS5 may refer to:

== Non-structural protein 5 ==
- NS5 protein, a 900-residue peptide found in the Dengue virus
- NS5A (Hepacivirus), a zinc-binding and proline-rich hydrophilic phosphoprotein
- NS5B (Hepacivirus), a viral protein found in the hepatitis C virus

== Places ==
- Cape Breton Centre (constituency N.S. 05), Nova Scotia, Canada
- Yew Tee MRT station (station code: NS5), an above-ground Mass Rapid Transit station on the North South line in Choa Chu Kang, Singapore
- Tsuzumigataki Station (station code: NS5), Kawanishi, Hyōgo Prefecture, Japan
- Komba Station (station code: NS05), Kita-ku, Saitama, Japan

== Other ==
- NS-5, a model of robot in the 2004 American science fiction action film I, Robot
- NS5-brane, a five-dimensional p-brane that carries a magnetic charge under the B-field
- Blue Origin NS-5, a 2016 June 19 Blue Origin suborbital spaceflight mission for the New Shepard
- RAF N.S. 5, a British NS class airship
- Netscape Communicator 5, a cancelled webbrowser and internet suite
- Mozilla Application Suite webbrowser initial release, identified as Netscape 5

== See also ==
- NS4 (disambiguation)
- NS (disambiguation)
- 5 (disambiguation)
