= British Rail Class 01/5 =

TOPS classification for privately owned mainline-registered shunting locomotives

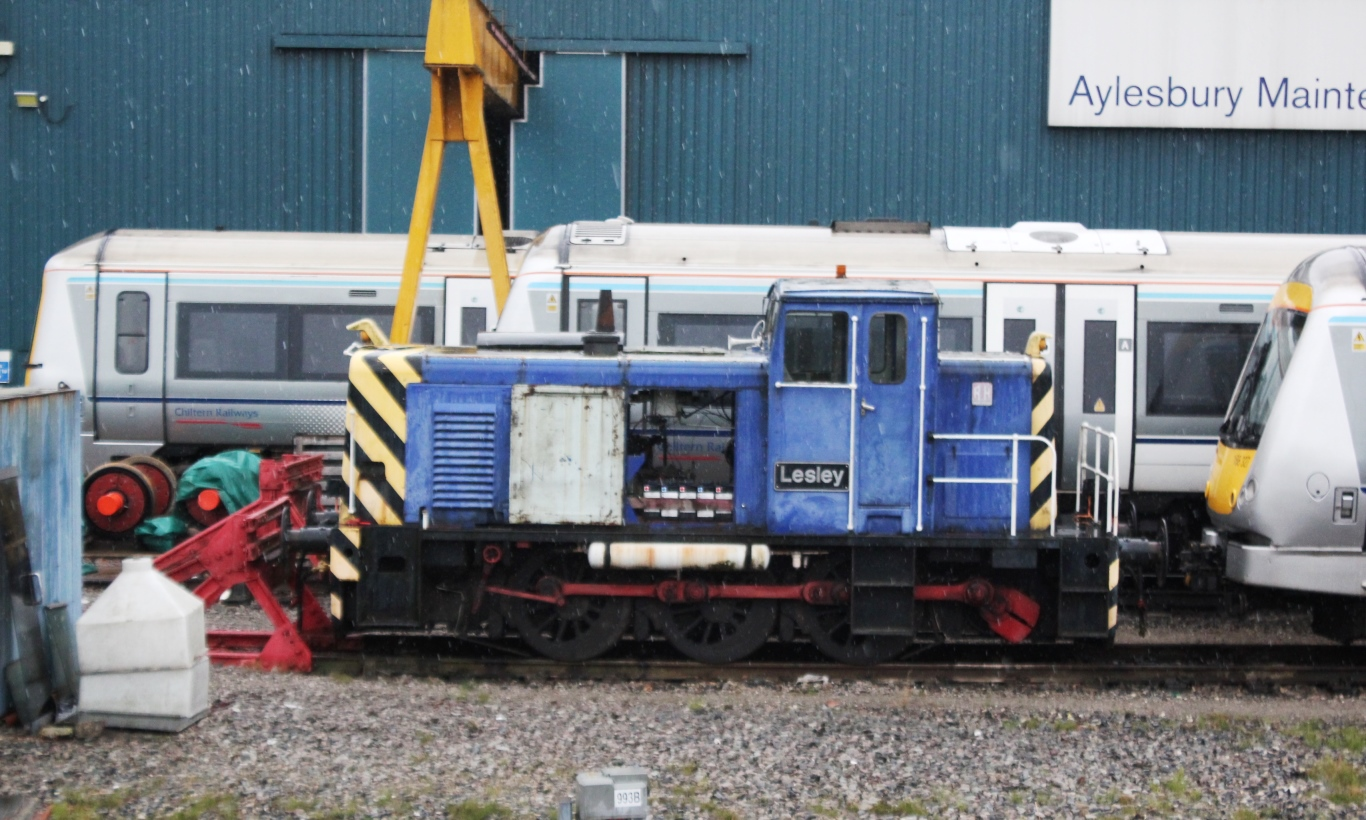
01509 Lesley is Chiltern Railways' depot shunter at Aylesbury

The British Rail Class 01/5 designation (TOPS code) encompasses a variety of privately owned shunting locomotives that are passed to be operated on the British mainline railway system. The types of shunter issued numbers under this classification are generally designs which did not operate under British Rail or did not carry TOPS numbers.

All 01/5 locomotives are 1,435 mm (4 ft 8 1/2 in) gauge.

== Preservation ==
At least four Class 01/5 registered locomotive have been preserved. Two being at Long Marston, with another in the German military colours.

== Fleet details ==
Key	In service	Withdrawn	Preserved	Renumbered	Scrapped

Number			Year built	Builder	Wheel arrangement	Final livery	Refer- ences
Class 01/5	Other(s)	Works	Year built	Builder	Wheel arrangement	Final livery	Refer- ences
01501	627	664	1984	Andrew Barclay	0-6-0DH		
01502	628	665	1984	Andrew Barclay	0-6-0DH		
01503	629	666	1984	Andrew Barclay	0-6-0DH		
01504	630	667	1984	Andrew Barclay	0-6-0DH		
01505	626	663	1984	Andrew Barclay	0-6-0DH		
01506	631	668	1984	Andrew Barclay	0-6-0DH		
01507	425, VENOM	459519	1961	Ruston & Hornsby	0-6-0DH	Green	
01508	428	466617	1961	Ruston & Hornsby	0-6-0DH		
01509	433, Lesley	468043	1963	Ruston & Hornsby	0-6-0DH	Blue	
01510	272	V320	1987	Thomas Hill	4wDH		
01511	275	V323	1988	Thomas Hill	4wDH		
01512	301, CONDUCTOR	V319, 76699	1987, rebuilt 2002	Thomas Hill, rebuilt LH Group	4wDH		
01513	302, GREENSLEEVES	V318, 76638	1987, rebuilt 2002	Thomas Hill, rebuilt LH Group	4wDH		
01514	303	V332, 76634	1988, rebuilt 2002	Thomas Hill, rebuilt LH Group	4wDH		
01515	304	V321, 76629	1987, rebuilt 2002	Thomas Hill, rebuilt LH Group	4wDH		
01516—01519	Numbers never issued.						
01520	274	V322	1987	Thomas Hill	4wDH		
01521	278, FLACK	V333	1988	Thomas Hill	4wDH		
01522	254	272V	1977	Thomas Hill	4wDH		
01523	259	299V	1981	Thomas Hill	4wDH		
01524	261	301V	1982	Thomas Hill	4wDH		
01525	264, DRAPER	306V	1983	Thomas Hill	4wDH		
01526	265	307V	1983	Thomas Hill	4wDH		
01527	256	274V	1977	Thomas Hill	4wDH		
01528	267	309V	1983	Thomas Hill	4wDH		
01529	268	310V	1984	Thomas Hill	4wDH		
01530	269	311V	1984	Thomas Hill	4wDH		
01531	H4323, Colonel Tomline	7018, 6578	1971, rebuilt 1999	Hunslet Engine Company rebuilt by HAB	0-6-0DH		
01532—01540	Numbers never issued						
01541	260	300V	1982	Thomas Hill	4wDH		
01542	262	302V	1982	Thomas Hill	4wDH		
01543	263	303V	1982	Thomas Hill	4wDH		
01544	252	270V	1977	Thomas Hill	4wDH		
01545	253	271V	1977	Thomas Hill	4wDH		
01546	255	273V	1977	Thomas Hill	4wDH		
01547	266	308V	1983	Thomas Hill	4wDH		
01548	257	275V	1978	Thomas Hill	4wDH		
01549	258	298V	1981	Thomas Hill	4wDH		
01550	271	V324	1987	Thomas Hill	4wDH		
01551	H016, LANCELOT	D1122	1966	English Electric, Vulcan Foundry	0-4-0DH	Blue	
01552	D3	167V	1966	Thomas Hill	0-6-0DH	Blue/Green	
01553	12082		1950	BR Derby	0-6-0DE	BR Green	
01554	HELEN	264V	1976	Thomas Hill	4wDH	Green	
01555	JAMES, 4	292V	1980	Thomas Hill	4wDH	Green	
01556	D6	D1191	1960	Hudswell Clarke	0-6-0DM	Green	
01557	3004, KAREN	10147	1963	Rolls-Royce Sentinel	0-6-0DH	Green	
01558	DH23	10226	1965	Rolls-Royce Sentinel	4wDH	Blue	
01559	DH24	10227	1965	Rolls-Royce Sentinel	4wDH	Green	
01560	DH25	10229	1965	Rolls-Royce Sentinel	4wDH	Green	
01561	Kathryn, 5482	257V	1975	Thomas Hill	0-6-0DH		
01562	Black beast, 6475	257V	1975	Thomas Hill	0-6-0DH		
01563	12083		1950	Derby	0-6-0DE		
01564	12088		1950	Derby	0-6-0DE		
01565	3001	10144	1963	Sentinel	0-6-0DH		
01567	ELIZABETH	276V	1977	Thomas Hill	4wDH	Green	
01568	HELEN	264V	1976	Thomas Hill	4wDH	Green	
01569	EMMA	281V	1978	Thomas Hill	4wDH		
01570		773	1990	Hunslet-Barclay	B-B DH		
01571	124, Coral	261V	1976	Thomas Hill	0-6-0DH		
01572	Kathryn, 5482	10256	1966	Sentinel	0-6-0DH		
01573	H006	6294	1965	Hunslet	0-6-0DH		
01574-01580	Numbers never issued						
01581	TM4150	LGN971310798	1998	Trackmobile	4wDM R/R		
01583	422	459517		Ruston & Hornsby	0-6-0DH	Green	
01585	Scaz	459518	1961	Ruston & Hornsby	0-6-0DH		
01599	This number has been used for test and training within T.O.P.S., it never was assigned to a real locomotive.						
