= NS4 =

NS4 may refer to:

== Non-structural protein 4 ==
- NS4 (HCV) - two viral proteins found in hepatitis C virus:
  - NS4A
  - NS4B
- Dengue virus NS4a and NS4b
- West Nile virus NS4A and NS4B

== Transportation ==
- New Shepard 4, a Blue Origin reusable space launch vehicle booster rocket (booster #4)
- Blue Origin NS-4, a 2016 April 2 Blue Origin suborbital spaceflight mission for the New Shepard
- RAF N.S. 4, a British NS class airship
- Choa Chu Kang MRT/LRT station (station code: NS4) abbreviated as (NS4/BP1); Singapore
- Uguisunomori Station (station code: NS04), Kawanishi, Hyōgo Prefecture, Japan
- Higashi-Miyahara Station (station code: NS04), Kita-ku, Saitama, Japan
- Toyota NS4 - a plug-in hybrid concept car unveiled at the January 2012 North American International Auto Show.

== Other ==
- Bedford (provincial electoral district), constituency N.S. 04; Nova Scotia, Canada
- Novelty seeking level 4, disorderliness
- NS-4; a fictional robot from the 2004 film, "I, Robot"
- Netscape Communicator - also known as Netscape 4, or NS4

== See also ==
- NS (disambiguation)
- 4 (disambiguation)
