= NS Class 600 =

Locomotive class

Class 600
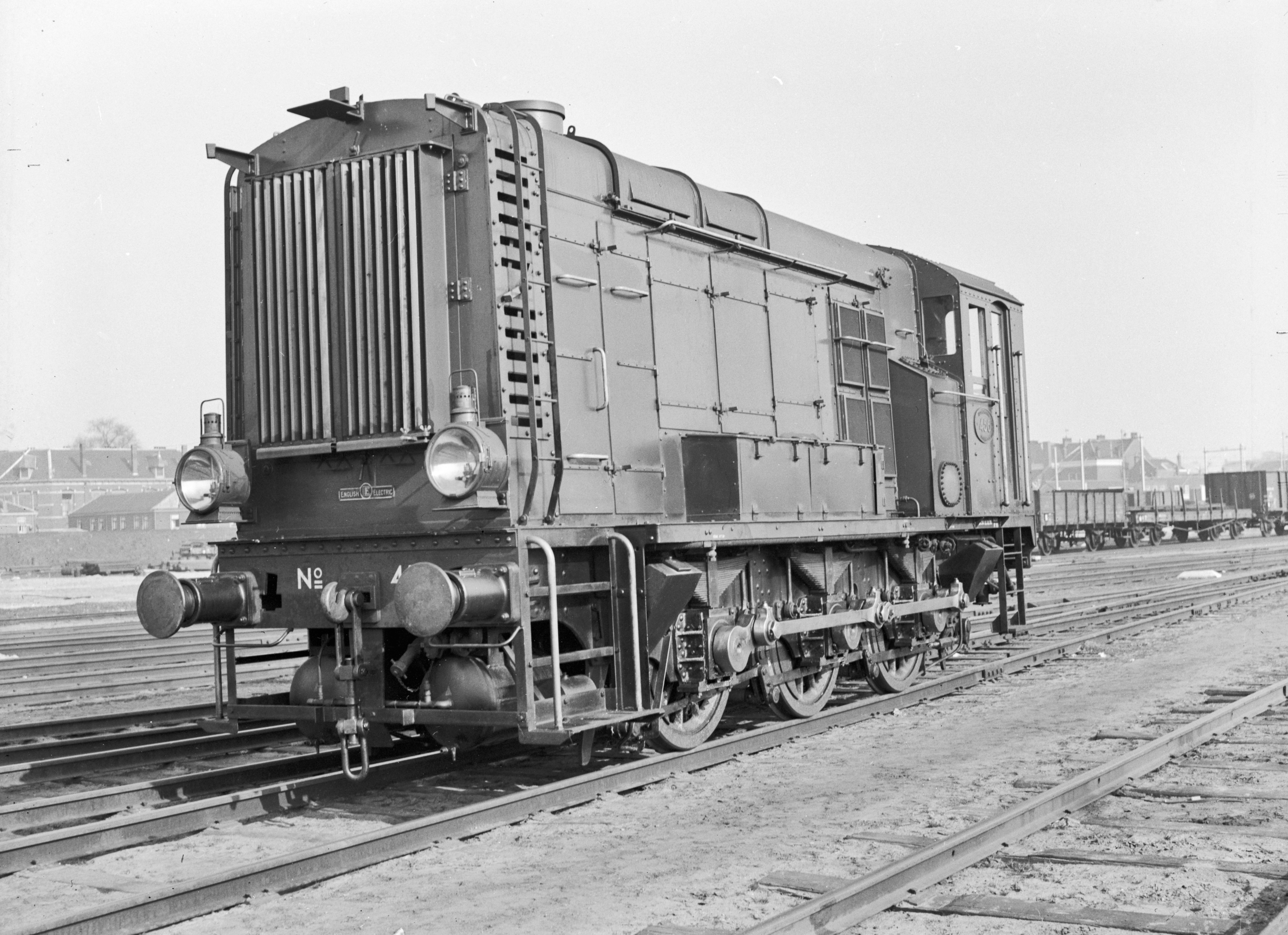
Type and origin
- Power type: Diesel-electric
- Builder: English Electric
- Build date: 1950-1957
- Total produced: 65
Specifications
- Configuration
  - Whyte: 0-6-0DE
  - AAR: C
  - UIC: C
- Gauge: 1,435 mm (4 ft 8 1/2 in) standard gauge
- Driver dia.: 1,230 mm (48.43 in)
- Length: 9.068 m (29 ft 9 in)
- Adhesive weight: 47 t (46 long tons; 52 short tons)
- Loco weight: 47 t (46 long tons; 52 short tons)
- Fuel type: Diesel fuel
- Prime mover: English Electric 6KT
- Engine type: "6KT" diesel engine
- Cylinders: 6
Performance figures
- Maximum speed: 30 km/h (19 mph)
- Power output: 400 hp (300 kW)
- Tractive effort: 143 kN (32,147.68 lb_{f})
Career
- Operators: Nederlandse Spoorwegen
- Class: 600
- Numbers: 601-665 (as delivered), 671-693 (after fitment with remote control)
- Nicknames: Hippel, Bakkie (little bin)
- Delivered: 1950-1957

The NS Class 600 were a class of 65 shunting locomotives built by English Electric in England between 1950 and 1957 for Nederlandse Spoorwegen (NS). The first 10 were built at Dick, Kerr & Co, Preston and the remaining 55 at Vulcan Foundry, Newton-le-Willows. They are very similar to the British Rail Class 11. Twenty-three locomotives were later fitted with radio remote-control, and renumbered in the range 671–693.

In 2013 there are still two locomotives active daily in The Netherlands. One is active for Railpro in Crailoo and the other is active for LOCON Benelux in Apeldoorn.

== Class 500 ==
There was also the similar NS Class 500. The difference between the two classes is that Class 600 has a "6KT" diesel engine of 400 hp (300 kW) and a Knorr braking system for train use, a Class 500 has a "6K" diesel engine of 350 hp (260 kW) and only an engine brake.

The first ten locomotives of the class 500 were built for the War Department and were taken on by NS after the war after service in Europe. NS subsequently placed orders for a further 35 locomotives. There was also an order for 15 locomotives to be delivered without engines that would have an alternative engine fitted in the Netherlands. These were numbered as 451-465 briefly before being renumbered to 701–715.

== Post-NS use ==
This class was withdrawn by NS in the early 2000s. Many have been preserved, including several which have been repatriated to England.

Some are still in use by the private company Rotterdam Rail Feeding in the Netherlands.

Privately owned 663 was moved from the Dartmoor Railway to the NRM annex at Shildon on 17 October 2006 to take up pilot duties. As of 2012 it has been at the Ribble Steam Railway in Preston, where it first worked after repatriation in 2005. Although part way through a repaint, 663 is in running order.

Number(s)		Location	Image
601	671	Netherlands State Railway, NL	
604		VSM, NL	
607		RailPro Amsterdam, NL	
609		nl:Museumspoorlijn STAR, NL	
618		VSM, NL	
625	690	Ribble Steam Railway, UK	
629	-	Dutch National Railway Museum, NL	
636		VSM, NL	
639		ZLSM, NL	
647		nl:Stapelplaats Crailoo near Hilversum	
649	692	Private location, UK	
653	-	Weardale Railway, UK	
660	-	MBS, NL	
661		VSM, NL	
662		Stichting Spoorverleden Drachten, NL	
663	-	Ribble Steam Railway, UK	
612	677	ZLSM, NL	
632	687	East Kent Railway, UK	

== Modelling ==
There is a well known and accurate H0 scale model offered in various liveries by Roco.
